= Blair Witch =

American horror media franchise

- Original franchise logo
- Created by: Daniel Myrick; Eduardo Sánchez
- Original work: The Blair Witch Project (1999)
- Owner: Lionsgate Studios

Print publications
- Books: The Blair Witch Project: A Dossier; Blair Witch: Book of Shadows
- Novels: The Blair Witch Project: The Fotonovel; Blair Witch: The Secret Confessions of Rustin Parr; Blair Witch: Graveyard Shift; The Blair Witch Files
- Comics: The Blair Witch Project; The Blair Witch Chronicles; Blair Witch: Dark Testaments

Films and television
- Films: The Blair Witch Project (1999); Book of Shadows: Blair Witch 2 (2000); Blair Witch (2016)
- Television specials: Curse of the Blair Witch (1999); Sticks and Stones: An Exploration of the Blair Witch Legend (1999); The Massacre of The Burkittsville 7: The Blair Witch Legacy (2000); Shadow of the Blair Witch (2000)

Games
- Traditional: Hunt a Killer: Blair Witch (2020)
- Video games: Blair Witch Volume I: Rustin Parr (2000); Blair Witch Volume II: The Legend of Coffin Rock (2000); Blair Witch Volume III: The Elly Kedward Tale (2000); Blair Witch (2019)

Audio
- Soundtrack: Book of Shadows: Blair Witch 2 (2000)

Blair Witch is an American horror media franchise created by Daniel Myrick and Eduardo Sánchez, distributed by Artisan Entertainment (now Lionsgate) and produced by Haxan Films that consists of three feature films and various additional media. The development of the franchise's first installment, The Blair Witch Project, started in 1993. Myrick and Sánchez wrote a 35-page outline of a story with the dialogue to be improvised. Filming began in 1997 and lasted eight days. The film follows the disappearance of three student filmmakers in the woods near Burkittsville, Maryland, while shooting a documentary on the local legend known as the "Blair Witch".

After premiering at the 1999 Sundance Film Festival, the film was released on July 30, 1999, after months of publicity during a controversial promotional campaign. The film went on to be a massive commercial success, and a sequel, Book of Shadows: Blair Witch 2, was released on October 27, 2000. A third installment, Blair Witch, was released on September 16, 2016. Series of video games, books, novels and comic books were released to accompany the films. A fourth installment was announced in April 2024 as a collaboration between Lionsgate and Blumhouse.

== Legend ==
The backstory for the film is a legend created by Myrick and Sánchez which is detailed in The Curse of the Blair Witch, a mockumentary broadcast on the Syfy Channel in 1999 prior to the release of The Blair Witch Project. Sánchez and Myrick also maintained a website at BlairWitch.com which added further details to the legend.

The fictional tale describes the murders and disappearances of some of the residents of Blair, Maryland, the fictitious former name of Burkittsville, Maryland, from the 18th to the 20th century. According to the legend, residents always blame these occurrences on the ghost of Elly Kedward (also a fictitious person), a Blair resident executed in 1785 by exposure for practicing witchcraft. The mockumentary presents the legend as real, complete with manufactured newspaper articles, newsreels, television news reports, and staged interviews in an attempt to convince viewers of its legitimacy.

According to Ben Rock, the man who created the backstory for Haxan, he took inspiration from the real Maryland legend of the woman Moll Dyer. Sometime in the winter of 1697, Dyer was accused of witchcraft, tried, and subsequently banished from Leonardtown, Maryland. Her body was later discovered frozen to a rock in the forest.

== Film ==
Title	U.S. release date	Director(s)	Screenwriter(s)	Producer(s)
The Blair Witch Project	July 14, 1999	Daniel Myrick & Eduardo Sánchez		Gregg Hale and Robin Cowie
Book of Shadows: Blair Witch 2	October 27, 2000	Joe Berlinger	Dick Beebe & Joe Berlinger	Bill Carraro
Blair Witch	September 16, 2016	Adam Wingard	Simon Barrett	Roy Lee, Steven Schneider, Keith Calder and Jess Calder
Blair Witch Project	September 24, 2027	Dylan Clark	Chris Thomas Devlin and Dylan Clark	James Wan, Jason Blum, Roy Lee, Adam Hendricks and Greg Gilreath

Blair Witch story chronology
Original continuity
- The Blair Witch Project (1999)
- Book of Shadows: Blair Witch 2 (2000)
Alternate continuity
- The Blair Witch Project (1999)
- Blair Witch (2016)

=== The Blair Witch Project (1999) ===
Heather Donahue, Michael Williams and Joshua Leonard, student filmmakers, set out to shoot a documentary about the Blair Witch. In the Black Hills forest near Burkittsville, Maryland, many children had vanished in the 1940s and people still avoid going too deep into the woods. The party sets out to look for facts that prove the legend, equipped only with two cameras and a little hiking gear. First, they find little piles of stone that must have been arranged artificially, later, they find themselves lost in the woods. Eerie sounds at night and more piles of stones in places where they have not been before cause the already desperate group to panic. One night, days after they should have been back home, Josh disappears. While searching for Josh, Heather and Mike find a derelict house in a clearing and go inside, where they see runic symbols on the wall next to child-sized handprints. Josh's voice seems to be coming from somewhere inside the house, and Mike rushes upstairs. Mike then realizes that the voice is now coming from the basement, and rushes down the steps. Suddenly, Mike is rendered silent and the camera falls. Hysterical, Heather follows and sees Mike in the corner of the room, faced against a wall. Suddenly Heather's camera is knocked down and she too is rendered silent. The film runs for a few seconds, then dies.

=== Book of Shadows: Blair Witch 2 (2000) ===
Book of Shadows: Blair Witch 2 returns to Maryland's Black Hills region in the wake of The Blair Witch Project and the prodigious media coverage devoted to its conflation of documentary style and supernatural legend, fans and curiosity-seekers have descended upon the movie's real-life setting of Burkittsville, Maryland. Jeff Patterson (Jeffrey Donovan), a black-sheep "townie" only recently released from a mental institution, has turned his obsession with the Blair Witch into a business and has lured four young people to Burkittsville for a tour of the Witch's purported Black Hills' haunts. Jeff's clients are also fixated on the film, for reasons they themselves may not fully comprehend. Erica Geerson (Erica Leerhsen) is a practicing Wiccan who has immersed herself in Blair Witch mythology, even though she decries the film's portrayal of her fellow witches. Grad students Tristen Ryler (Tristine Skyler) and Stephen Ryan Parker (Stephen Barker Turner) are writing a book about the Blair Witch, but disagree completely about the story's basis in fact, with folklorist Tristen arguing that it must contain some grain of truth while Stephen insists it is a textbook case of mass hysteria. Completing the group is Kim Diamond (Kim Director), a hard-edged, sardonic Goth aficionado possessed of striking psychic abilities.

After spending a strange and disorienting night at one of the most sinister sites in Blair Witch lore, the five campers awake to a scene of destruction and no memory of having gone to sleep. They return to Jeff's abandoned warehouse loft to try to piece together what happened. As Jeff leads Erica, Tristen, Stephen and Kim across the rickety drawbridge and unlocks the metal door to a chorus of barking dogs, they are entering a place no safer than the woods they just left. Inside, the legend seems to begin to bleed into reality as their mass hysteria ensues. Erica mysteriously disappears and Tristen ends up hanging herself from the second floor railing of the warehouse.

The end of the film reveals that Jeff, Stephen, and Kim have been arrested. Each is interrogated separately, with the police showing each person footage of their crimes. Security camera footage shows Kim stabbing a cashier in the neck. Surveillance camera footage shows a naked Jeff killing Erica, arranging her clothes, and putting her dead body in the closet. Jeff's video shows Stephen assaulting Tristen, pushing her over the second floor banister, and accusing her of being a witch. All three, close to a nervous breakdown, proclaim their innocence.

The tie-in mockumentary to Book of Shadows: Blair Witch 2, Shadow of the Blair Witch, establishes the events of the film being a film within a film; the in-universe mockumentary reveals that Book of Shadows: Blair Witch 2 is "a film adaptation" based on the "Black Hills murders" that took place shortly after the release of The Blair Witch Project. Shadow of the Blair Witch follows "the real James Patterson"'s defense team as the case prepares for trial and as the public reacts to plans to fictionalize the case's events for the big screen from the defense's point-of-view. Protests of the film Book of Shadows: Blair Witch 2 are discussed within the documentary coming from both the families of those involved with the case and from the Wiccan community as a whole. Rachel Moskowitz and Andre Brooks respectively portray the "real" Kim Diamond and Jeffrey Patterson within the documentary.

=== Blair Witch (2016) ===
In 2009, Ed Sánchez and Daniel Myrick intended to produce a third Blair Witch film. The film was a sequel to the first film, would potentially contain the actors from the first film in some context, and would not reference any of the events from Book of Shadows. In 2011, Sánchez remarked that further development on a sequel depended on getting Lionsgate to approve the idea and for his and Myrick's schedule to match up. The film went into development hell.

At the 2016 San Diego Comic-Con held in July, the film marketed with the faux-title The Woods, turned out to be the sequel Blair Witch. The film was released on September 16, 2016.

=== Blair Witch Project (2027) ===
In August 2009, Eduardo Sánchez expressed interest in exploring different eras in future movies; stating: "Ideally, each Blair Witch film would be a completely different kind of movie. We've thought about doing a film that takes place in the late 1700s and looks like a [Stanley] Kubrick movie with gritty looking people and lighting".

In April 2022, Lionsgate entered early development on the next film installment, with intentions being that the project will relaunch the franchise, and that the studio is reportedly considering developing the project into a streaming exclusive film. By May 2023, Oliver Park signed onto the project as director, with Daniel Myrick and Eduardo Sánchez serving as producers. The project was said to be a joint-venture production between Lions Gate Films and Haxan Films. Principal photography was tentatively scheduled to commence later that summer or fall. At CinemaCon held in April 2024, the film was officially announced to be in development. Roy Lee will return to the franchise in his role as producer, alongside Jason Blum. The project will be a joint-venture production between Lionsgate and Blumhouse Productions. In April 2026, it was confirmed that Dylan Clark would be directing the film. That same month, it was announced that James Wan of Atomic Monster and Adam Hendricks and Greg Gilreath of Divide/Conquer joined the producing team. Michael Clear, Judson Scott, Steven Schneider, Joshua Leonard, Michael C. Williams, Eduardo Sánchez, Daniel Myrick and Gregg Hale serve as executive producers.

In May 2026, Williams confirmed that the movie would see the return of the titular villain while explaining that the new installment would not be a remake.

The film is scheduled to be released theatrically in the United States on September 24, 2027.

== Television ==
In October 2017, Sánchez and the rest of the film's creative team were developing a Blair Witch television series, though he pointed out that any decisions would ultimately be up to Lionsgate now that they own the rights to it.

== Mockumentaries ==
Four mockumentaries on the Blair Witch were produced to promote the films. The first being Curse of the Blair Witch which aired on the Syfy Channel in 1999, prior to the release of The Blair Witch Project, and the second being Sticks and Stones: An Exploration of the Blair Witch Legend which overlaps quite a bit with Curse of the Blair Witch. The latter two documentaries, The Massacre of The Burkittsville 7: The Blair Witch Legacy and Shadow of the Blair Witch, both directed by Ben Rock, aired in 2000.

=== Curse of the Blair Witch (1999) ===
Before the release of The Blair Witch Project in 1999, the Sci-Fi Channel aired a 45-minute mockumentary about the Blair Witch called Curse of the Blair Witch.

The program offers firsthand interviews with several fictional colleagues and relatives of Heather Donahue, Josh Leonard and Michael Williams, including their Montgomery College film professor.

One of the highlights of the video is the first mention of Elly Kedward, the woman who would go on to become the Blair Witch.

Curse of the Blair Witch was created to give credibility to the idea that the events of The Blair Witch Project actually occurred, which was how the film was marketed upon its initial release.

=== Sticks and Stones: An Exploration of the Blair Witch Legend (1999) ===
Directed by Daniel Myrick and Eduardo Sánchez, considered for inclusion in the theatrical release of The Blair Witch Project and released to VHS as part of a special promotion that ran when The Blair Witch Project was released on home video, Sticks and Stones runs 30 minutes and overlaps with the mockumentary Curse of the Blair Witch. The mockumentary primarily consists of alternate cuts of many of the previous films' interviews, but there is some new material to be found, including a brief 1995 conversation with Joshua Leonard's father about his son's disappearance.

Sticks and Stones also includes an extended conversation between Heather Donahue and Michael Williams from a deleted scene that was cut from the theatrical release of The Blair Witch Project.

=== The Massacre of The Burkittsville 7: The Blair Witch Legacy (2000) ===
When The Blair Witch Project premiered on Showtime, it was accompanied by a new 40-minute Blair Witch mockumentary named The Burkittsville 7, which delved into the murder case of Rustin Parr that was mentioned in The Blair Witch Project. Within the mockumentary it is theorised that Kyle Brody, the lone survivor of the murders, may have himself been involved in the murders. Within the mockumentary, it is mentioned that after Parr was hanged, Brody grew up to become a troubled adult who spent most of the latter part of his life in mental institutions before committing suicide in the year 1971.

=== Shadow of the Blair Witch (2000) ===
Directed by Ben Rock, and airing on the Sci-Fi Channel in conjunction with the release of Book of Shadows: Blair Witch 2, the mockumentary Shadow of the Blair Witch takes an objective look at the events of Book of Shadows: Blair Witch 2. Running 45 minutes, it examines the troubled life of "the real Jeff Patterson" and his obsession with The Blair Witch Project. Within the documentary, the events of Book of Shadows: Blair Witch 2 are presented as a film adaptation based on the "Black Hills murders" that took place shortly after the events of The Blair Witch Project. This documentary presents Book of Shadows: Blair Witch 2 as a film within a film.

Shadow of the Blair Witch follows "the real James Patterson"'s defense team as the case prepares for trial and as the public reacts to plans to fictionalize the case's events for the big screen. Protests of the film Book of Shadows: Blair Witch 2 are discussed coming from both the families of those involved with the case and from the Wiccan community as a whole.

== Main cast and characters ==
List indicators
- A dark grey cell indicates that the character was not in the film or that the character's presence in the film has yet to be announced.
- A ^{U} indicates an uncredited role.
- An ^{A} indicates an appearance through archival footage or stills.

Characters	Theatrical films			Mockumentaries			
Characters	The Blair Witch Project	Book of Shadows: Blair Witch 2	Blair Witch	Curse of the Blair Witch	Sticks and Stones: An Exploration of the Blair Witch Legend	The Massacre of The Burkittsville 7: The Blair Witch Legacy	Shadow of the Blair Witch
Characters	1999	2000	2016	1999		2000	
Heather Donahue	Heather Donahue	Heather Donahue^{A}^{U}	Heather Donahue^{A}^{U}	Heather Donahue	Heather Donahue	Heather Donahue^{A}^{U}	
Michael C. Williams	Michael C. Williams	Michael C. Williams^{A}^{U}	Michael C. Williams^{A}^{U}	Michael C. Williams	Michael C. Williams	Michael C. Williams^{A}^{U}	
Joshua Leonard	Joshua Leonard	Joshua Leonard^{A}^{U}		Joshua Leonard	Joshua Leonard	Joshua Leonard^{A}^{U}	
Kimberly "Kim" Diamond		Kim Director					Rachel Moskowitz
Jeffrey Patterson		Jeffrey Donovan					Andre Brooks
Rustin Parr		Raynor Scheine		Frank Pastor	Frank Pastor	Frank Pastor^{A}^{U}	
Bill Barnes				Bill Dreggors		Bill Dreggors	Bill Dreggors
Buck Buchanan				Buck Buchanan	Buck Buchanan		
Mary Brown	Patricia DeCou						
Erica Geerson		Erica Leerhsen					
Tristen Ryler		Tristine Skyler					
Stephen Ryan Parker		Stephen Barker Turner					
Sheriff Ronald Cravens		Lanny Flaherty					
Eileen Treacle		Lauren Hulsey					
Peggy		Kennen Sisco					
James Donahue			James Allen McCune				
Lisa Arlington			Callie Hernandez				
Ashley Bennett			Corbin Reid				
Lane			Wes Robinson				
Talia			Valorie Curry				
Peter			Brandon Scott				

== Additional crew and production details ==
Film	Crew/Detail					
Film	Composer	Cinematographer	Editors	Production companies	Distributing companies	Running time
The Blair Witch Project	Tony Cora	Neal Fredericks	Daniel Myrick & Eduardo Sánchez	Haxan Films	Artisan Entertainment	1 hr 21 mins
Book of Shadows: Blair Witch 2	Carter Burwell	Nancy Schreiber	Sarah Flack	Haxan Films	Artisan Entertainment	1 hr 30 mins
Blair Witch	Adam Wingard	Robby Baumgartner	Louis Cioffi	Lionsgate Films, Vertigo Entertainment, Room 101 Inc., Snoot Entertainment	Lionsgate Films	1 hr 29 mins
Untitled film	TBA	TBA	TBA	Lionsgate Films, Atomic Monster, Blumhouse Productions, Divide/Conquer	Lionsgate Films	TBA

== Reception ==
=== Box office performance ===
Film	Release date	Box office gross				Ranking	Budget	Ref.
Film	Release date	Opening weekend	United States	Outside North America	Worldwide	All time North America	Budget	Ref.
The Blair Witch Project	July 14, 1999	$29,207,381	$140,539,099	$108,100,000	$248,639,099	#345	$60,000	
Book of Shadows: Blair Witch 2	October 27, 2000	$13,223,887	$26,437,094	$21,300,000	$47,737,094	#2,551	$15 million	
Blair Witch	September 16, 2016	$9,650,000	$20,777,061	$24,396,093	$45,173,154	#3,134	$5 million	
Total			$187,753,254	$153,796,093	$341,549,347		$20.06 million	

=== Critical and public reception ===
Reception of Blair Witch films
Film	Rotten Tomatoes	Metacritic	CinemaScore
The Blair Witch Project	87% (160 reviews)	81 (33 reviews)	C+
Book of Shadows: Blair Witch 2	14% (108 reviews)	15 (34 reviews)	D−
Blair Witch	37% (216 reviews)	47 (41 reviews)	D+

== In other media ==
=== Literature ===
==== Novels ====
In September 1999, D.A. Stern compiled The Blair Witch Project: A Dossier. Perpetuating the film's "true story" angle, the dossier consisted of fabricated police reports, pictures, interviews, and newspaper articles presenting the movie's premise as fact, as well as further elaboration on the Elly Kedward and Rustin Parr legends. In 2000 D.A. Stern compiled another dossier in the same fashion called Blair Witch: Book of Shadows (released in November 2000) regarding the events of the second film.

Stern wrote the 2000 novel Blair Witch: The Secret Confessions of Rustin Parr and in the same year wrote the novel Blair Witch: Graveyard Shift, featuring all original characters and plot. In May 1999, a photonovel adaptation of The Blair Witch Project was written by Claire Forbes and was released by Fotonovel Publications.

The Blair Witch Files

A series of eight young adult books entitled The Blair Witch Files were released by Random subsidiary Bantam from 2000 to 2001. The books center on Cade Merill, a fictional cousin of Heather Donahue, who investigates phenomena related to the Blair Witch in attempt to discover what really happened to Heather, Mike, and Josh.

1. The Blair Witch Files 1 – The Witch's Daughter
2. The Blair Witch Files 2 – The Dark Room
3. The Blair Witch Files 3 – The Drowning Ghost
4. The Blair Witch Files 4 – Blood Nightmare
5. The Blair Witch Files 5 – The Death Card
6. The Blair Witch Files 6 – The Prisoner
7. The Blair Witch Files 7 – The Night Shifters
8. The Blair Witch Files 8 – The Obsession

Comic books

In August 1999, Oni Press released a one-shot comic promoting the first film, simply titled The Blair Witch Project. Written by Jen Van Meter and drawn by Bernie Mireault, Guy Davis, and Tommy Lee Edwards, the comic featured three short stories elaborating on the mythology of the Blair Witch. In mid-2000, the same group worked on a four-issue series called The Blair Witch Chronicles.

In October 2000, coinciding with the release of Book of Shadows: Blair Witch 2, Image Comics released a one-shot called Blair Witch: Dark Testaments, drawn by Charlie Adlard and written by Ian Edginton.

=== Video games ===
In 2000, a trilogy of video games based on the films was released, which greatly expanded on the myths suggested in the first film. The graphics engine and characters were all derived from the producer's earlier game Nocturne. Each game, developed by a different team, focused on different aspects of the Blair Witch mythology: Rustin Parr, Coffin Rock, and Elly Kedward, respectively.

- Blair Witch Volume I: Rustin Parr – (Terminal Reality)
- Blair Witch Volume II: The Legend of Coffin Rock – (Human Head Studios)
- Blair Witch Volume III: The Elly Kedward Tale – (Ritual Entertainment)

The trilogy received mixed reviews from critics, with most criticism being directed towards the very linear gameplay, clumsy controls and camera angles, and short length. The first volume, Rustin Parr, received the most praise, ranging from moderate to positive, with critics commending its storyline, graphics and atmosphere; some reviewers even claimed that the game was scarier than the film. The following volumes were less well-received, with PC Gamer saying that Volume 2's only saving grace was its low price and calling Volume 3 "amazingly mediocre".

Another Blair Witch game was released for PC and Xbox One. The game is a first-person survival horror game, and is both developed and published by Bloober Team. The game was released on August 30, 2019, and was also later released on the PlayStation 4, Nintendo Switch and Amazon Luna.

=== Fan Films ===
Along with all canon media in the franchise, it has also inspired a slew of fan films based on the franchise's lore. Most, if not all, come from YouTube. Notable ones include The Rustin Parr Project (2012), Doc.33 (2013), The Blair Witch Legacy (2018), BlackHills.mov (2023), and Blair Witch: The Reckoning (2025). All of these expand the Blair Witch lore in unique ways, regardless of their canon relevance. They also show that, in their own Blair Witch world, the supernatural entity isn't confined to the woods where it originates. They also serve as love letters to the original film/franchise, with callbacks and nods to what came before.

== See also ==
- List of ghost films
- Fakelore
- Moll Dyer
