= Rustin Parr =

Fictional character in the Blair Witch franchise

- Blair Witch character
- First appearance: Curse of the Blair Witch (1999)
- Last appearance: Book of Shadows: Blair Witch 2 (2000)
- Portrayed by: Frank Pastor; Raynor Scheine

In-universe information
- Classification: Mass murderer
- Location: Burkittsville, Maryland

Rustin Parr is a fictional character from the Blair Witch series of horror films. He first appeared in Curse of the Blair Witch (1999) as an old man on death row giving his last interview before being executed for the murders of seven children, in which he was portrayed by Frank Pastor. Created by Haxan Films, the character has subsequently been represented in various other media, including novels, and comic books.

== Development ==
In developing the mythology behind the film, the creators used many inspirations. For instance, several character names are near-anagrams: Elly Kedward (The Blair Witch) is Edward Kelley, a 16th-century mystic, and Rustin Parr, the fictional 1940s child-murderer, began as an anagram for Rasputin.

When it came time to cast the role, Haxan chose Frank Pastor, who had been a free-lance gardener hired to tend to the garden around the Haxan office. His prison interview scene was filmed at the Old St. Johns County Jail in St. Augustine, Florida. Pastor attended the first screening of The Blair Witch Project in 1998 at the Enzian Theater in Maitland, Florida. But sometime after that, he vanished. When the film became a massive success, Artisan Entertainment attempted to track Frank Pastor down, but was unable to, leading to them recasting the role for the film's sequel.

== Appearances ==
Rustin Parr made his first appearance in 1999, in the Curse of the Blair Witch, a mockumentary which aired on Syfy to promote the release of The Blair Witch Project. The footage from Curse was originally supposed to be part of the final film, but during the editing process Dan Myrick and Ed Sanchez realized that protagonists Heather, Mike, and Josh were the most engaging part of the film. The footage left on the cutting room floor was then repurposed for the mockumentary. As well as the films, there have been books and comics that have either expanded the character's backstory, or been based on a minor aspect of it.

=== Films and mockumentaries ===
- Curse of the Blair Witch
- Book of Shadows: Blair Witch 2
- Shadow of the Blair Witch
- The Burkittsville 7

=== Literature ===
Rustin first appeared outside of the film in the dossier written by DA Stern, produced to further promote The Blair Witch Project. Published on September 1, 1999, the book features newspaper articles recounting his trial and eventual execution.

More of Rustin's backstory is learned in The Blair Witch Files: The Dark Room which was published in August 2000, when Laura Morely and Cade Merrill venture to the ruins of the Parr house, but through Laura's eyes and her camera the house is perfectly intact. Laura sees Rustin as a child along with his twin brother Dale, and their fighting and bickering. She ends up watching the past play out like a film, and sees Rustin beat Dale to death with a tree branch, although Rustin's parents tell everyone he died in a hunting accident.

- The Blair Witch Project: A Dossier - September 1, 1999
- Blair Witch: The Secret Confession of Rustin Parr - August 1, 2000
- Blair Witch: Graveyard Shift - September 28, 2000
- Blair Witch: Book of Shadows - Dossier - November 1, 2000

== Merchandise ==
The character of Rustin Parr was featured on t-shirts after the first film was released. Halloween masks of Parr were released by Cesar Masks, upon release of the second film.

== See also ==
- List of horror film villains
- Michael Myers
- Jason Voorhees
- Freddy Krueger
- Leatherface
