= Blair Witch (video game) =

2019 video game

- Developer: Bloober Team
- Publisher: Lionsgate Games
- Director: Mateusz Lenart
- Designer: Paweł Niezabitowski
- Programmer: Mariusz Szaflik
- Writers: Barbara Kciuk; Marcin Wełnicki; Andrzej Mądrzak
- Composer: Arkadiusz Reikowski
- Series: Blair Witch
- Engine: Unreal Engine 4
- Platforms: Microsoft Windows; Xbox One; PlayStation 4; Nintendo Switch; Oculus Quest; Oculus Quest 2; Luna
- Release: Windows, Xbox One; August 30, 2019; PlayStation 4; December 3, 2019; Nintendo Switch; June 25, 2020; Oculus Quest, Quest 2; October 29, 2020; Amazon Luna; October 7, 2021
- Genre: Survival horror
- Mode: Single-player

Blair Witch is a 2019 survival horror game developed by Bloober Team and published by Lionsgate Games. Based on the film series of the same name, the game is set in 1996, two years after the events of The Blair Witch Project (1999), and follows former police officer Ellis Lynch as he joins the search in Black Hills Forest for a missing nine-year old boy named Peter Shannon.

The game focuses on survival horror mechanics and stealth and is played from a first person perspective, requiring the player to use items such as a camera, cellphone, flashlight or Ellis' dog, Bullet, to track and follow Peter's trail while fending off shadowy creatures. Along the way, players will find strange wooden dolls, photographs and cassette tapes and will also be tasked with solving puzzles. Like the film, it integrates the found-footage subgenre with the gameplay and story, often through the use of cassette tapes.

Blair Witch received mixed reviews with critics praising its atmosphere, graphics, sound design and the use of a dog companion, but criticised its gameplay design and perceived difficulty.

== Gameplay ==
As with previous Bloober Team games, Blair Witch is a single player first-person survival horror game. The player controls former police officer and veteran Ellis Lynch who joins a search party for a missing boy in the Black Hills forest in Burkittsville, Maryland.

The game plays out in a semi-open world, making players explore different parts of the areas which can sometimes lead to abandoned structures, campsites or little crevices that only Bullet can access. Along the way, they will find items such as wooden dolls, polaroids of missing people, dog tags and psychiatrist notes which are stored in the backpack. Also stored in the backpack are dog treats which can be fed to Bullet. Sometimes, areas can be blocked off by a log or a door and are only accessible by solving a puzzle or by collecting several items that opens or operates for example, a steam donkey. It may also require the player to find cassette tapes. There are two types: red and blue. The red tape allows players to manipulate and rewind time to move objects that have been locked or moved in place, while the blue tape tells more of the story. These tapes can be accessed via the camcorder.

While in the forest, Ellis will reminisce about his past through the use of several devices: a cell phone and a walkie-talkie. Whenever a call is received, the player can choose to accept or reject. This decision chosen will directly affect the game's conclusion as well. Messages and voicemails will also pop up occasionally, players can access them in the menu. Also in the phone's menu are the popular 2D games Snake and Astro Blaster which can be played at any point of the playthrough.

A major element of gameplay is Ellis' dog, Bullet. The player is able to interact with the dog through a command menu. There are five commands, "Stay", "Stay close", "Reprimand", "Pet" and "Seek". The latter serves as an integral part of gameplay, as items found throughout allow Bullet to track the scent of certain objects or the general direction of where to go. During combat, Bullet serves as an indicator when forest creatures (resembling the one from the 2016 film) attack the player and will bark when they are close by. The player can defend themselves by shining their flashlight towards the creatures. Another feature with Bullet is the psychological state of Ellis. It is crucial for the player to keep Bullet close to them at all times, as being separated from him for some time can affect the state of the character. The game's ending is dependent on the relationship between the player and the dog, accounting for the actions the player has done.

The game roughly takes up to six hours to complete, with a possibility of four endings and an additional secret ending.

== Plot ==
In 1996, two years after the events of the first film, veteran and former police officer Ellis Lynch (voiced by Joseph May) alongside his police dog Bullet, travels to Black Hills Forest in Burkittsville, Maryland to join the search party for missing 9-year-old Peter Shannon. During his search, he regularly contacts search party leader and close friend Sheriff Emmet Lanning, who is concerned about Ellis' PTSD and mental health.

Prior to the game's events, Ellis had a traumatic childhood riddled with psychological issues. After experiencing dissociative amnesia, he also forgets his childhood best friend who went missing in Black Hills Forest. As an adult, he was encouraged by his colonel father to enlist in the military, however the Gulf War worsened his mental state after witnessing his squad's death and accidentally killing an innocent woman. After his discharge, he marries a woman named Jess and becomes a police officer, but a PTSD episode causes him to accidentally kill a burglar, Peter's brother Adam. Jess separates from Ellis, and Lanning gifts him Bullet to help cope with his trauma. Upon hearing about Peter's disappearance, he joins the search party to relieve his guilt over killing Adam.

After finding Peter's hat and following his scent, Ellis and Bullet reach a campsite, where Ellis finds a working camcorder before blacking out and waking up to night falling. Ellis realizes he could use the camera and recovered tapes to manipulate reality and time around him. Although he agrees with Lanning to rendezvous at the campsite, he decides to continue so Bullet would not lose Peter's scent. Ellis and Bullet eventually arrive at a crooked white tree with black vines, and they are attacked by several silhouetted creatures, with the option to scare them off with his flashlight. He discovers a tape that shows Peter's abduction by a mysterious figure. The two find a broken down truck that suddenly becomes Lanning's police vehicle. Inside, they see a police report of a missing lumberer named Todd Mackinnon, with the report showing that they have moved forward in time to the year 2000. A mysterious voice on the radio advises them to turn on the lights, which transports them to the next morning. They find Lanning dead, with another tape showing his murder by Peter's abductor.

As they continue with their search, Ellis continues to black out and recover in the campsite, often experiencing erratic time jumps and nightmares reliving his traumatic past. He manages to find himself in a lumber mill, where he decides to call Jess one last time and declines Jess's suggestion to back out from the search. He discovers the corpse of Mackinnon, who had been murdered by Peter's kidnapper. He finally confronts the abductor, a disheveled man named Carver, who talks about a mysterious "her" and stresses that Peter must die because it's "her will", as he knocks out Ellis.

Ellis awakens at the decaying campsite some time in the future, where Carver instructs Ellis to locate the white tree, make an effigy, and then kill Bullet. Ellis refuses to kill his dog; Bullet runs off and is found injured, but Ellis' attempts to rescue his dog is in vain as he passes out and wakes up with Bullet disappearing. After taunting him of Bullet's supposed death, Carver leaves a videotape that Ellis uses to transport to a decrepit house, where he is haunted by a woman's voice and sees visions where he could kill Lanning and Mackinnon. He manages to make his way to the basement, but does not find Peter. A trapdoor leads him to Carver, who reveals himself to be an alternate, older Ellis. After Ellis had separated from Jess, he traveled with Bullet to the forest to live in isolation, where he was driven insane by the Blair Witch and became subservient to her instructions to kill. With the forest transporting him to different time periods, he was responsible for abducting and killing his childhood friend, and later abducting Peter, which led the younger Ellis to the forest.

Multiple endings and outcomes occur from Ellis' actions. If Bullet is treated well, he survives the events, but will die if he is mistreated. If he kills Carver, Lanning, or Mackinnon, he completes his transformation into Carver and Bullet leaves in fear, causing a time loop. If he lets Carver mortally wound him, Carver ceases to exist, finally breaking the cycle. He dies with Bullet either leaving him or staying with him at his last moments, with his body later found by Jess and the search party. Lanning and Mackinnon's bodies will either remain missing or be recovered, while Peter is either missing, found dead, or found alive and safely brought back to his family.

== Development ==
Blair Witch was developed by Bloober Team who are known for their psychological horror video games, Layers of Fear and Observer. The idea of developing the game was conceived by Lionsgate who had purchased the rights in 2003 from Artisan Entertainment and were interested in doing a Blair Witch game after liking the work that Bloober had done on Layers of Fear. Building on the foundation of their previous titles, Blair Witch was idealised as a semi open-world game with vast improvements to allow players to explore and fully immerse themselves. According to writer Maciej Glomb, Lionsgate had given the team free range to work on an original story that was set in the same universe as the films with guidelines set by the studio. This allowed the team to work on character development and the story while also focusing on the psychological aspects of the game. The game was developed using Unreal Engine 4.

The setting of the game was designed to follow the 1999 film, with the landscape of the Black Hills Forest. As writer Barbara Kciuk explains: "For us, open spaces are not only a challenge but also an opportunity...a forest setting gives you completely new tools to play with. Players can never be sure what lurks in the darkness". For inspiration, the team sought out video games such as Firewatch, Alan Wake and Outlast and films that re-defined the found-footage genre which include REC and Paranormal Activity.

== Release ==
Blair Witch was announced at E3 2019. The game was released for Microsoft Windows and Xbox One on August 30, 2019. At Gamescom 2019, Blair Witch was added to Xbox Game Pass along with several other titles.

== Reception ==
Reception

Aggregate score
| Aggregator | Score |
|---|---|
| Metacritic | NS: 59/100; PC: 69/100; PS4: 65/100; XONE: 67/100 |

Review scores
| Publication | Score |
|---|---|
| Destructoid | 7/10 |
| Game Informer | 7/10 |
| GameRevolution | 3/5 |
| GameSpot | 5/10 |
| GamesRadar+ | 3/5 |
| IGN | 8.8/10 |
| PC Gamer (US) | 58/100 |

Blair Witch received "mixed or average" reviews, according to review aggregator platform Metacritic. Alex Spencer of PC Gamer called Blair Witch "an interesting horror game that never manages to escape the shadow of its ‘90s inspiration" but criticised it for not developing some of the mechanics further. Writing for GameSpot, Alessandro Barbosa praised the game's atmosphere and sound design but was critical saying that Blair Witch does not have a complex tale, in addition calling the story twists as predictable. Jeff Cork of Game Informer echoed similar pros, but criticised the enemy encounters and its inconsistency. Destructoid's Patrick Hancock commented that "Blair Witch sufficiently blends regular scares with psychological horror", but noted the abundant amount of jump scares that become annoying and noticeable.

The game's atmosphere and sound design were highlighted positively with Polygon editor Cass Marshall calling the atmosphere of the forest "satisfying", and said that developer Bloober Team created an ominous, intimidating forest that looks haunted, but noted that occasionally can be frustrating when navigating and becoming lost in it. Eurogamer's Viki Blake highlighted the visuals and the masterful use of sound when creating the scares and the set-pieces as memorable.

The characters received generally positive reviews. T.J. Hafer, writing for IGN, stated that the dog made the experience much more bearable and was useful for tracking down important items, but was critical of the dog's "flimsy" AI. Jason Faulkner of GameRevolution called Bullet's inclusion as "under-utilised", with his most significant usage being directing the player towards enemies during combat. Alyssa Mercante of GamesRadar+ pointed out the character of Ellis Lynch, commenting on the relationship between Ellis and Bullet and the clever use of mental problems, and called this narrative tool as excellent that keeps the game on the edge.

=== Accolades ===
Despite mixed reviews, the game was nominated for "Xbox Game of the Year" at the 2019 Golden Joystick Awards, and for "Use of Sound, New IP" at the NAVGTR Awards.
