= The Blair Witch Files =

Novels based on The Blair Witch Project

- The Witch's Daughter (2000); The Dark Room (2000); The Drowning Ghost (2000); Blood Nightmare (2000); The Death Card (2001); The Prisoner (2001); The Night Shifters (2001); The Obsession (2001)
- Author: Cade Merrill
- Cover artist: Cliff Nielsen
- Country: United States
- Language: English
- Genre: Supernatural-mystery
- Publisher: Bantam Books
- Published: August 8, 2000 – July 10, 2001 (initial publication)
- Media type: Print (paperback)
- No. of books: 8
- Website: TheBlairWitchFiles.com

The Blair Witch Files, or simply Blair Witch Files, is a series of supernatural-mystery novels first published in August 2000. The books were created and produced by Parachute Publishing, under license from Artisan Entertainment, and were distributed by Random House publishing's subsidiary Bantam Books. The books are ghostwritten by a number of authors and published under the collective pseudonym of the titular character Cade Merrill. The novels chronicle Merrill's personal investigation into the disappearance of his cousin Heather Donahue, from The Blair Witch Project.

== Publishing history ==
Amorette Jones, who had previous experience in the consumer products field, served as the senior VP of marketing for Artisan Pictures. Jones worked closely on the marketing campaign for The Blair Witch Project, and oversaw all licensing. The licensing campaign for the film generated approximately $1 million in licensed merchandise sales within a year. Following the success, Artisan began looking at ways to expand the property, which lead them to team up with Parachute Publishing, and Random House Children's Books to produce a book series inspired by the legend of the Blair Witch. Bantam Books was tasked with marketing the new series, dubbed The Blair Witch Files, which began in the summer of 2000.

Before each book was published, its manuscript was sent to Ben Rock, by the Artisan VP of consumer products Ferrell McDonald. Rock, who created all of the folklore for the Blair Witch, would read each manuscript and make notes on how the books could better fit with the lore that had already been established. His notes would sometimes focus on geography based issues, more than anything else. Rock's notes were never about the specific narrative in the books, but rather their consistency.

The series was originally published in English by Random House Children's Books imprint Bantam Books in the United States, and by Hodder Headline in the United Kingdom. The book covers were designed by John Fontana, and illustrated by Cliff Nielsen.

== Books ==
=== The Witch's Daughter ===
The Witch's Daughter, the first book in the series, was written by Carol Ellis and JoAnn Egan Neil, and published in August 2000. It begins with Cade Merrill receiving an email from Justin Petit, a high school senior from Washington, D.C., requesting help obtaining information about a woman named Louise Irwin, also known as Lee Papert, who was born in Maryland in 1926. Justin suspects Lee Papert is the Blair Witch's daughter, and is she responsible for eight gruesome deaths over the last century.

=== The Dark Room ===
The Dark Room was written by Megan Stine and published alongside the first book in August 2000. The story begins in June 1999, with Cade receiving an email from Laura Morely requesting help in finding a place to stay in Burkittsville for the summer while she is on a mission photographing the forest. Laura arrives the first week of July, she and Cade hike to the Parr foundation, except Laura is able to see into the past and see the house as it was in the 1910s. She is able to capture what she sees on film, but it's only visible in the Darkroom. Her photographs open an unknown chapter in the life of child-killer Rustin Parr, and they are the key to unlocking her own past and her connection to the Blair Witch. Soon though it becomes all to much for Laura and she succumbs to the power and disappears.

=== The Drowning Ghost ===
The Drowning Ghost was written by Natalie Standiford and released in tandem with Book of Shadows: Blair Witch 2 in October 2000.

Eileen Treacle drowned when a ghostly figure pulled her down into Tappy East Creek. Some 175 years later, while on a school camping trip, three people mysteriously die near that same creek.

=== Blood Nightmare ===
Blood Nightmare was written by Marc Cerasini and published in December 2000.

Frank Hunter takes a wrong turn down a dark, winding road and finds himself in a strange, silent town that seems to exist only in his dreams. Then he meets a beautiful young woman who shares those dreams, but in hers, Frank is marked for death.

=== The Death Card ===
The Death Card was written by JoAnn Egan Neil and published in February 2001.

In 1974, Gavin Burns, the nephew of Bill Barnes, disappeared in the woods near Deep Creek Lake. The only witness, 16-year old Sharon Webster, knows he was a victim of the Blair Witch and she will carry that secret to her grave. But her silence means that someone else may suffer Gavin's fate.

=== The Prisoner ===
The Prisoner was written by Cameron Dokey and published in April 2001.

At 18, Eliza Baynes was convicted of murder. She claimed that the real killer was under the control of the Blair Witch, but now she wants Cade's help.

=== The Night Shifters ===
The Night Shifters was written by Carol Ellis & Ellen Steiber and published on May 8, 2001.

Cade Merrill's search for the truth about the Blair Witch often leaves him with as many questions as answers. When he receives an e-mail from a psychic who can communicate with the spirit of the Blair Witch, he wonders if it's too good to be true.

=== The Obsession ===
The Obsession was written by Cameron Dokey and published in July 2001.

Cade Merrill continues to find the secrets of the Blair legend, with the psychic that apparently can communicate with the spirit of the Blair Witch, but this could also lead into a deadly trap.

== Characters ==
- Ronald Cravens - Sheriff of Burkittsville, Ronald is the strong willed, no nonsense police presence in town. He's adamantly against the supernatural and believed the footage found from Heather, Mike, and Josh was an elaborate hoax.
- Elly Kedward - real name, Annabeth Hutchinson, commonly known as the Blair Witch, was an Irish immigrant who migrated to Colonial Burkittsville. Annabeth took on the name Elly Kedward after the real Elly died on board the Reliant.
- Cade Merrill – the main character, a 17-year-old boy. Cade is determined to find answers about the disappearance of his cousin Heather, while also being completely skeptical about the presence of any form of supernatural. With a tendency to get wrapped up in his research, Cade is very forgetful in other aspects of his life, with his complete attention being taken up by his leads. He's very devoted to his small town, knowing all of his neighbors, and their children having babysat most of them.
- Mr. Merrill - Cade's father is an engineer for a high-tech wireless company. When he is not focused on working, his full attention is devoted to fly fishing.
- Mrs. Merrill - Cade's mother went to law school, but never practiced. Instead she opts to sell health-food supplements to her friends.
- Laura Morely - Laura was a recent high school graduate from Minnesota, and a self-proclaimed "Blair Witch freak". She intended to take the summer off, and travel to Burkittsville to photograph the forest, before majoring in Photography that Autumn. She had stiff blond hair, chopped at different lengths, Robin egg blue eyes, and a pierced navel.
- Ted the Fed - Ted works for the Federal Bureau of Investigation and is an unseen asset for Cade, who continually helps in his research.

== See also ==
- The Nancy Drew Files
- Harry Potter
- A Series of Unfortunate Events
- The Spiderwick Chronicles
