= The Objective =

- Promotional film poster
- Directed by: Daniel Myrick
- Written by: Daniel Myrick; Mark A. Patton; Wesley Clark Jr.
- Produced by: Zev Guber; Jeremy Wall; Richard Halpern; Karim Debbagh
- Starring: Jonas Ball; Matthew R. Anderson; Jon Huertas; Michael C. Williams (actor)
- Narrated by: Jonas Ball
- Cinematography: Stephanie Martin
- Edited by: Michael J. Duthie; Robert Florio
- Music by: Kays Al-Atrakchi
- Distributed by: IFC Films
- Release dates: April 24, 2008 (Morocco); February 6, 2009 (United States)
- Running time: 90 minutes
- Countries: United States; Morocco
- Language: English

The Objective is a 2008 science fiction horror film directed by Daniel Myrick, and co-written by Myrick, Mark A. Patton, and Wesley Clark, Jr. The film stars Jonas Ball, Matthew R. Anderson, and Michael C. Williams. The plot revolves around CIA Agent Benjamin Keynes recalling the time when he led a Special Forces team through the mountains of Afghanistan in search of an Afghan cleric, only to encounter strange paranormal incidents.

It premiered in Morocco in April 2008 and in the United States in February 2009.

== Plot ==
In Ghazni Province, Afghanistan, a U.S. Army Special Forces team led by Chief Warrant Officer Wally Hamer, with Master-Sergeant Kenny Tanner and Sergeants Vince Degetau, Joe Trinoski, Tim Cole, and Pete Sadler, meets CIA Agent Benjamin Keynes. Their mission is to locate Mohammed Aban, an important Afghan cleric. After being inserted into southern Afghanistan, they recruit a local guide, Abdul, and travel into the mountains, where Aban is reputed to hide.

The team soon encounters inexplicable phenomena. Gunmen ambush them, killing Trinoski, but the attackers' bodies vanish. Later, two approaching headlights separate, fly into the sky, and disappear. Their radio and GPS subsequently fail, while an apparently invisible helicopter approaches before its sound abruptly ceases. The radio also receives unintelligible Persian or Arabic. After caching Trinoski's body, they find his remains scattered across rocks the following morning. They also discover strange triangular markers and, eventually, a cave occupied by an old man wearing what appears to be a nineteenth-century British army uniform. Sadler recalls a legend about a British regiment that disappeared in the mountains, leaving one survivor.

Cole later sees, through night-vision goggles, sword-wielding men in black robes apparently surrounding the old man and opens fire, accidentally killing him. Keynes orders the team onwards rather than risk detection. Degetau develops severe stomach pains, while everyone's canteens inexplicably fill with sand. Abdul discovers a valley that apparently did not previously exist. When a bright light appears, Tanner and Cole attempt to flank it but are vaporized. Convinced that they face something beyond human understanding, Abdul commits suicide.

The remaining soldiers demand an explanation from Keynes. He reveals thermal-camera footage of a triangular object that becomes nearly invisible before lifting off after Aban and two others approach it. The CIA has monitored the phenomenon since 1980, and Keynes and the team were sent to investigate while transmitting his thermal recordings to Langley. Keynes theorises that the object is one of the Vimanas of ancient Indian mythology, linking the phenomenon to Alexander the Great's passage through the region and to the strange lights and apparitions they have encountered. He also reveals that the team is considered expendable and will not be rescued. Hamer disappears the following morning.

Running out of supplies, the survivors eventually reach the site where the British regiment apparently vanished. Sadler fires at the seemingly invisible vimanas and is vaporized. Keynes flees with Degetau but later abandons him; after hearing his screams, he sees him obliterated by the objects. Exhausted, Keynes finds an oasis and discovers Hamer's body beside it. After passing out, he awakens to a distant helicopter and fires a flare. Other flares appear across the valley, followed by the bright light and two beings that approach him. When one touches his forehead, Keynes experiences visions of his previous encounters and enters a trance.

He then sees himself floating above a hospital bed, holding a talisman taken from Aban's home, while doctors and a military colonel observe through a window. In a trance, he whispers, "It will save us all..."

During the final credits, interviews with Keynes' wife reveal that his family has not been informed of his whereabouts and considers him missing.

== Cast ==
- Jonas Ball as CIA Agent Benjamin Keynes
- Matthew R. Anderson as Chief Warrant Officer Wally Hamer, 180A SF Warrant Officer
- Jon Huertas as Sergeant Vincent Degetau, 18D SF Medical Sgt.
- Michael C. Williams as Sergeant Joe Trinoski, 18C SF Demolitions/Engineering Sgt.
- Sam Hunter as Sergeant Tim Cole, 18E SF Communications Sgt.
- Jeff Prewett as Sergeant Pete Sadler, 18B SF Weapons Sgt./Sniper
- Kenny Taylor as Master Sergeant Kenny Tanner, 18Z/18F Senior Team Sgt. / Intelligence Sgt.
- Chems-Eddine Zinoune as Abdul
- P. David Miller as Major Matt McCarthy, 18A SF Officer
- Vanessa Johansson as Stacy Keanes
- Jacqueline Harris as Matilde Seymour

== Reception ==
On Rotten Tomatoes the film has an approval rating of 33% based on reviews from 12 critics.

Reviews were mixed. Screen International's critic was largely negative, describing the film as low-budget with an unremarkable cast, though noting the Moroccan filming locations as a visual highlight. The Hollywood Reporter similarly found the film's suspenseful tone undermined by an overly familiar setup, drawing repeated comparisons to Myrick's earlier The Blair Witch Project.

By contrast, PopMatters gave the film a more favorable notice, calling it an impressive return for Myrick that maintained tension without over-relying on the shock tactics common in the genre, and praising its ambiguous ending.
