= The Blair Witch Project =

1999 film by Daniel Myrick and Eduardo Sánchez

- Theatrical release poster
- Directed by: Daniel Myrick; Eduardo Sánchez
- Written by: Daniel Myrick; Eduardo Sánchez
- Produced by: Gregg Hale; Mike Monello; Robin Cowie
- Starring: Heather Donahue; Michael Williams; Joshua Leonard
- Cinematography: Neal Fredericks
- Edited by: Daniel Myrick; Eduardo Sánchez
- Music by: Tony Cora
- Production company: Haxan Films
- Distributed by: Artisan Entertainment
- Release dates: January 23, 1999 (Sundance); July 14, 1999 (United States)
- Running time: 81 minutes
- Country: United States
- Language: English
- Budget: $200,000–$750,000
- Box office: $248.6 million

The Blair Witch Project is a 1999 American found footage supernatural horror film written, edited, and directed by Daniel Myrick and Eduardo Sánchez. The found footage work is a pseudo-documentary in which three young students (Heather Donahue, Michael C. Williams, and Joshua Leonard) hike into the Appalachian Mountains near Burkittsville, Maryland, to shoot a documentary about a local myth known as the Blair Witch.

Myrick and Sánchez conceived of a fictional legend of the Blair Witch in 1993. They developed a 35-page screenplay with the dialogue to be improvised. A casting call advertisement on Backstage magazine was prepared by the directors; Donahue, Williams, and Leonard were cast. The film entered production in October 1997, with the principal photography lasting eight days. Most of the filming was done on the Greenway Trail along Seneca Creek in Montgomery County, Maryland. About 20 hours of footage was shot, which was edited down to 82 minutes. Shot on an original budget of $35,000–$60,000, the film had a final cost of $200,000–$750,000 after post-production and marketing.

When The Blair Witch Project premiered at the Sundance Film Festival at midnight on January 23, 1999, its promotional marketing campaign listed the actors as either "missing" or "deceased". Due to its successful Sundance run, Artisan Entertainment bought the film's distribution rights for $1.1 million. The film had a limited theatrical release on July 14 of the same year, before expanding to a wider release starting on July 30. While the film received highly positive reviews from critics, audience reception was polarized.

One of the most successful independent films of all time, The Blair Witch Project was a sleeper hit that grossed $248.6 million worldwide. The film was also ranked the best found footage movie of all time by editors from both IndieWire and Entertainment Weekly. Despite the success, the three main actors had reportedly lived in poverty. In 2000, they sued Artisan Entertainment claiming unfair compensation, eventually reaching a $300,000 settlement. The Blair Witch Project launched a media franchise, which includes two sequels (Book of Shadows and Blair Witch), novels, comic books, and video games. It revived the found-footage technique and influenced similarly successful horror films such as Paranormal Activity (2007), Rec (2007), and Cloverfield (2008).

== Plot ==
In October 1994, film students Heather, Mike, and Josh set out to produce a documentary about the mythical "Blair Witch". They travel to Burkittsville, Maryland, and interview residents about the myth. Locals tell them of Rustin Parr, a hermit who lived deep in the forest and abducted seven children in 1941; he murdered them all in his basement, killing them in pairs while having one stand in a corner, facing the wall. The students explore the forest in north Burkittsville to research the myth. They meet two fishermen, one of whom warns them that the forest is cursed. He tells them of a young child named Robin Weaver, who went missing in 1888.

The students decide to hike to Coffin Rock for their first day in the woods due to its connection with the Robin Weaver story. Despite Robin returning to Burkittsville, one of the search parties that set out into the Black Hills Forest to look for her never came back. Eventually, another search party came across the bodies of the five missing men, their hands and feet tied together as they were ritualistically gutted and displayed upon Coffin Rock. They went back to town to gather help in burying the bodies of the missing search party, but upon returning to Coffin Rock, the bodies had vanished without a trace.

The students camp for the night and, the next day, find an old graveyard with seven small cairns, one of which Josh accidentally knocks over. That night, they hear the sound of sticks snapping. The following day, they try to hike back to the car but cannot find it before dark and make camp. They again hear sticks snapping. In the morning, they find three cairns built beside their tent. Heather learns her map is missing; Mike reveals he kicked it into a creek out of frustration, which provokes a fight between the trio as they realize they are lost. They head south, using Heather's compass, and discover stick figures hanging from trees. They again hear mysterious sounds that night, including children laughing. After an unknown force shakes the tent, they run outside and hide in the forest until dawn.

Upon returning to their tent, they find their possessions have been rifled, and Josh's equipment is covered with slime. They come across the same river they crossed earlier and realize they have been walking in circles. Josh vanishes the next morning, and Heather and Mike fail to find him. That night, they hear Josh's agonized cries but are unable to locate him; they theorize that his yells are a fabrication by the Blair Witch to draw them out of their camp.

Heather discovers a bundle of twigs tied with fabric from Josh's shirt the next day. Upon opening the bundle, she finds a blood-soaked scrap of his shirt containing bloodied teeth and hair. Although distraught, she does not tell Mike. That night, she records herself tearfully apologizing to her, Mike's, and Josh's mothers, taking responsibility for their predicament. She admits that something evil is haunting them and will ultimately take them.

Later, they hear Josh's voice again calling for help and follow it to the abandoned ruins of the house of Rustin Parr, featuring children's handprints on some of the walls. Trying to find Josh, they head to the attic but do not find him. Hearing the voice everywhere, Mike rushes downstairs, leaving Heather behind. As he enters the basement, an unseen force strikes Mike; he drops his camera and falls silent. A hysterical Heather enters the basement, to see Mike standing in a corner facing the wall, unresponsive to her screaming his name. The unseen force strikes Heather, causing her to drop her camera and fall silent as well; the camera then cuts to black.

== Cast ==
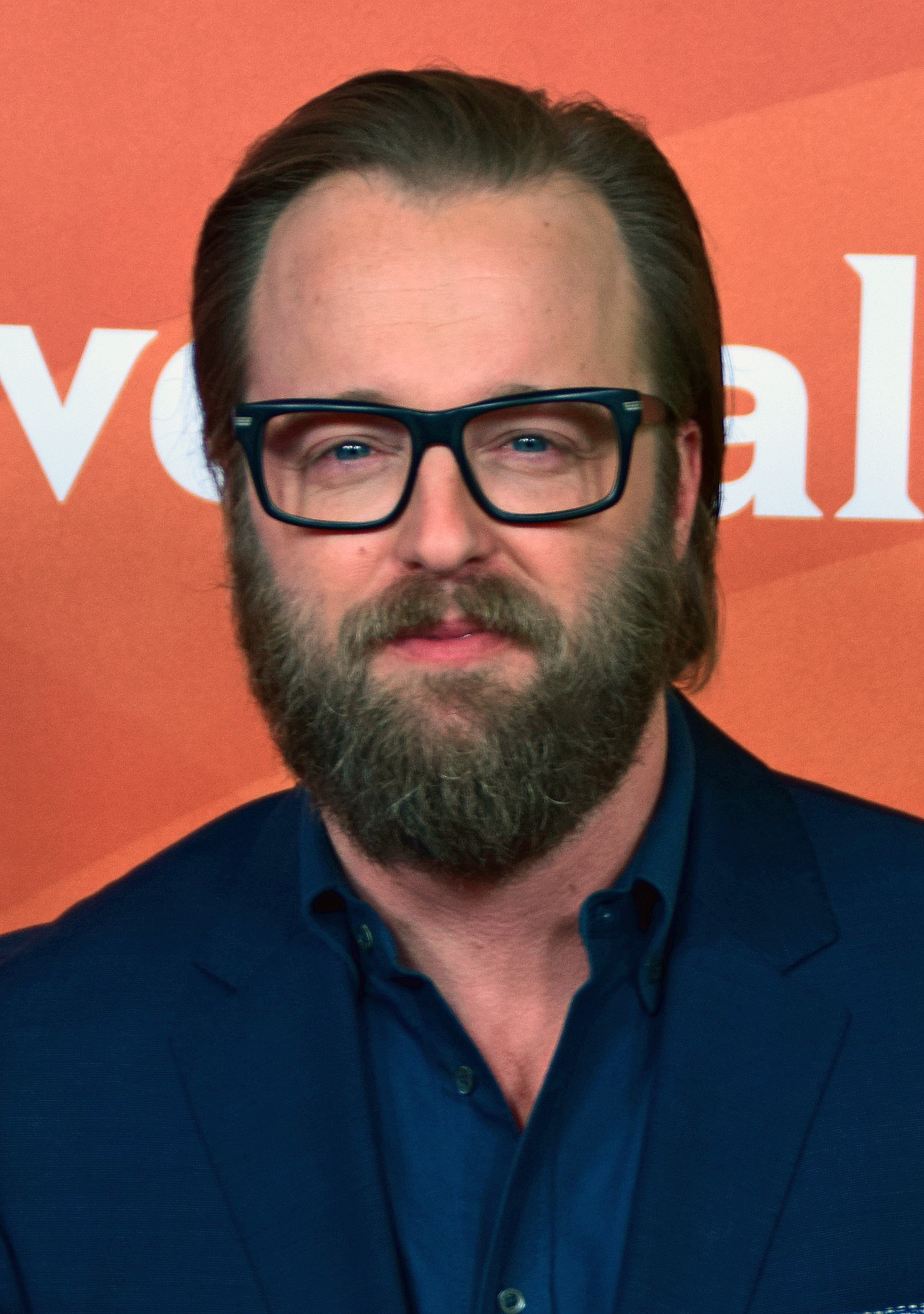
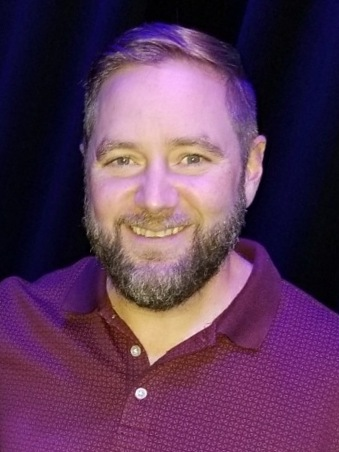
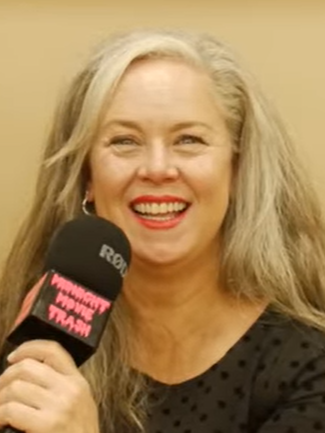
From left to right: Joshua Leonard, Michael C. Williams and Heather Donahue played fictionalized versions of themselves in the film.
- Heather Donahue as a fictionalized version of herself
- Joshua Leonard as a fictionalized version of himself
- Michael C. Williams as a fictionalized version of himself
- Bob Griffin as Short Fisherman
- Jim King as Burkittsville Resident Interviewee
- Sandra Sánchez as Waitress (as Sandra Sanchez)
- Ed Swanson as Fisherman with Glasses
- Patricia DeCou as Mary Brown
- Mark Mason as Man in Yellow Hat
- Susie Gooch as Interviewee with Child (as Jackie Hallex)

== Production ==
=== Development ===
Development of The Blair Witch Project began in 1993. While film students at the University of Central Florida, Daniel Myrick and Eduardo Sánchez were inspired to make the film after realizing that they found documentaries on paranormal phenomena scarier than traditional horror films. The two decided to create a film that combined the styles of both. In order to produce the project, they, along with Gregg Hale, Robin Cowie and Michael Monello, started Haxan Films. The namesake for the production company is Benjamin Christensen's 1922 silent documentary horror film Häxan (English: Witchcraft Through the Ages).

Myrick and Sánchez developed a 35-page screenplay for their fictional film, intending dialogue to be improvised. The directors placed a casting call advertisement in Backstage in June 1996, asking for actors with strong improvisational abilities. The informal improvisational audition process narrowed the pool of 2,000 actors.

According to Heather Donahue, auditions for the film were held at Musical Theater Works in New York City. The advertisement said a "completely improvised feature film" would be shot in a "wooded location". Donahue said that during the audition, Myrick and Sánchez posed her the question: "You've served seven years of a nine-year sentence. Why should we let you out on parole?" to which she had to respond. Joshua Leonard said he was cast due to his knowledge of how to run a camera, as no omniscient camera was used to film the scenes.

Pre-production began on October 5, 1997, and Michael Monello became a co-producer. In developing the mythology behind the film, the creators used many inspirations. For instance, several character names are near-anagrams: Elly Kedward (The Blair Witch) is Edward Kelley, a 16th-century mystic, and Rustin Parr, the fictional 1940s child-murderer, began as an anagram for Rasputin. The Blair Witch is said to be, according to legend, the ghost of Elly Kedward, a woman banished from the Blair Township (latter-day Burkittsville) for witchcraft in 1785.

The directors incorporated that part of the legend, along with allusions to the Salem witch trials and Arthur Miller's 1953 play The Crucible, to play on the themes of injustice done to those who were classified as witches.

The directors also cited influences such as the television series In Search of..., and horror documentary films Chariots of the Gods and The Legend of Boggy Creek. Other influences included commercially successful horror films such as The Shining, Alien, The Omen, and Jaws—the latter film being their major influence, as the film hides the witch from the viewer for its entirety, increasing the suspense of the unknown.

In talks with investors, the directors presented an eight-minute documentary, along with newspapers and news footage. The documentary was aired on the television series Split Screen hosted by John Pierson on August 6, 1998.

=== Filming ===
Principal photography began on October 23, 1997, in Maryland and lasted eight days, overseen by cinematographer Neal Fredericks, who provided a CP-16 film camera. The three actors shot all the footage shown in the film, except for one interview about Rustin Parr's murders. The "found footage" was shot with a Hi8 camcorder. Most of the film was shot in Seneca Creek State Park in Montgomery County, Maryland. A few scenes were filmed in the historic town of Burkittsville. Some of the townspeople interviewed in the film were not actors, and some were planted actors, unknown to the main cast. Donahue had never operated a camera before and spent two days in a "crash course". Donahue said she modeled her character after a director she had once worked with, noting her character's "self-assuredness" when everything went as planned, and confusion during crisis.

The actors were given clues as to their next location through messages hidden inside 35 mm film cans left in milk crates they found with satellite navigation units. They were given individual instructions to use to help improvise the action of the day. Teeth were obtained from a Maryland dentist for use as human remains in the film. Influenced by producer Gregg Hale's memories of his military training, in which "enemy soldiers" would hunt a trainee through wild terrain for three days, the directors moved the characters a long way during the day, harassing them by night, and depriving them of food.

Instead of using fictional names, all three actors used their real names in the film, something Donahue has regretted doing. She revealed in 2014 that she had trouble finding new roles because of it.

According to the filmmakers' commentary, the unseen figure that Donahue is shouting about as she is running away from the tent is the film's art director Ricardo Moreno, who was wearing white long-johns, white stockings, and white pantyhose pulled over his head. The final scenes were filmed at the historic Griggs House, a 150-year-old building located in the Patapsco Valley State Park near Granite, Maryland. Filming concluded on October 31, Halloween.

In an interview with Entertainment Weekly, Sánchez revealed that when principal photography first wrapped, approximately $20,000 to $25,000 had been spent. Richard Corliss of Time magazine reported a $35,000 estimated budget. By September 2016, The Blair Witch Project has been officially budgeted at $60,000.

Sánchez says that the ending with Mike standing in the corner was invented days before it was shot.

=== Post-production ===
After filming, the 20 hours of raw footage was cut down to 81 minutes; the editing process took more than eight months. The directors screened the first cut in small film festivals in order to get feedback and make changes that would ensure that it appealed to as large an audience as possible. Originally, it was hoped that the film would make it on to cable television, and the directors did not anticipate a wide release. The final version was submitted to Sundance Film Festival.

After becoming a surprise hit at Sundance, during its midnight premiere on January 25, 1999, Artisan Entertainment bought the distribution rights for $1.1 million. Prior to that, Artisan had wanted to change the film's original ending, as the test audience, although scared, were confused by it. Although the ending was not changed, an additional interview was added to the first section of the film to contextualize the ending. The directors and Williams traveled back to Maryland and shot four alternate endings, one of which employed bloody elements. They also shot additional interviews, at least one of which (the Parr backstory) made it into the wide-release cut. This footage would be the only segment of film not shot by the main actors. Ultimately, the directors and Williams decided to keep the original ending. Myrick said: "What makes us fearful is something that's out of the ordinary, unexplained. The first ending kept the audience off balance; it challenged our real world conventions and that's what really made it scary".

Post-production fees increased the cost of the film to several hundred thousand dollars before its Sundance debut and, after marketing costs, the total cost of the film has been estimated as ranging between $500,000 and $750,000.

=== Compensation controversy ===
In 2024, Donahue, Leonard and Williams detailed to Variety how, according to their claims, they had never been adequately compensated by Artisan Entertainment/Lionsgate for their work in the original movie. They recall living in poverty after the success, being barred from saying so publicly, and having few options since they had no "proper union or legal representation when the film was made". In the summer of 1999, they received a "performance bump" in the low five figures. In October 2000, with the release of Book of Shadows: Blair Witch 2 impending, Donahue convinced Williams and Leonard to sue Artisan. They reached a $300,000 settlement for each of them. The three actors claim that they had no clear knowledge that the entire movie would be composed of their found footage, and that they had not given much thought to the clause that allowed production to use their real identities. This led to subsequent discussions with Lionsgate regarding the usage of their likenesses. Despite the conflicts, Donahue, Leonard and Williams have stated that they are proud of their work in the movie.

== Marketing ==
A missing person poster showing Heather Donahue, Joshua Leonard, and Michael C. Williams as part of the film's marketing campaign tactic to portray its events as real

The Blair Witch Project is thought to be the first widely released film marketed primarily via the Internet. Kevin Foxe became executive producer in May 1998 and brought in Clein & Walker, a public relations firm. The film's official website launched in June, featuring faux police reports as well as "newsreel-style" interviews, and fielding questions about the "missing" students. These augmented the film's found footage device to spark debates across the Internet over whether the film was a real-life documentary or a work of fiction.

Some of the footage was screened during the Florida Film Festival in June. During screenings, the filmmakers made advertising efforts to promulgate the events in the film as factual, including the distribution of flyers at festivals such as Sundance, asking viewers to come forward with any information about the "missing" students. The campaign tactic was that viewers were being told, through missing persons posters, that the characters were missing while researching in the woods for the mythical Blair Witch. The IMDb page also listed the actors as "missing, presumed dead" in the first year of the film's availability. The film's website contains materials of actors posing as police and investigators giving testimony about their casework, and shared childhood photos of the actors to add a sense of realism. By August 1999, the website had received 160 million hits.

After the Sundance screening, Artisan acquired the film and a distribution strategy was created and implemented by Steven Rothenberg. The film's trailer was leaked on the website Ain't It Cool News on April 2, 1999, and the film was screened at 40 colleges in the United States to build word-of-mouth. A third, 40-second, trailer was shown before Star Wars: Episode I – The Phantom Menace in June.

USA Today reported that The Blair Witch Project was the first film to go viral despite having been produced before many of the technologies that facilitate such phenomena existed.

=== Fictional legend ===
The backstory for the film is a legend fabricated by Sánchez and Myrick which is detailed in the Curse of the Blair Witch, a mockumentary broadcast on the Sci-Fi Channel on July 12, 1999. Sánchez and Myrick also maintained a website which added further details to the legend.

The legend describes the killings and disappearances of some of the residents of Blair, Maryland (a fictitious town on the site of Burkittsville, Maryland) from the 18th to 20th centuries. Residents blamed these occurrences on the ghost of Elly Kedward, a Blair resident accused of practicing witchcraft in 1785 and sentenced to death by exposure. Curse of the Blair Witch presents the legend as real, complete with manufactured newspaper articles, newsreels, television news reports, and staged interviews.

== Release ==
The Blair Witch Project premiered as a Midnight Screening on Saturday, January 23, 1999, at the Sundance Film Festival, and opened Wednesday, July 14, at the Angelika Film Center in New York City before expanding to 25 cities at the weekend. It expanded nationwide on July 30.

=== Television broadcast ===
For its basic cable premiere in October 2001 on FX, two deleted scenes were reinserted during the end credits of the film. Neither deleted scene had ever been officially released until Second Sight Films' Blu-ray release in November of 2024.

=== Home media ===
The Blair Witch Project was released on VHS and DVD on October 22, 1999 by Artisan, presented in a 1.33:1 windowboxed aspect ratio and Dolby Digital 2.0 audio. Special features include the documentary Curse of the Blair Witch, a five-minute Newly Discovered Footage, audio commentary, production notes, and cast and crew biographies. The audio commentary presents directors Daniel Myrick, Eduardo Sánchez, and producers Rob Cowie, Mike Monello and Gregg Hale, in which they discuss the film's production. The Curse of the Blair Witch feature provides an in-depth look inside the creation of the film. More than $15 million was spent to market the home video release of the film.

The film's Blu-ray version was released on October 5, 2010, by Lionsgate. Best Buy and Lionsgate had an exclusive release of the Blu-ray made available on August 29 the same year. Additionally, in 2024, British label Second Sight Films completed a restored version of the film from new digital transfers of the video and film elements, approved by the producers and directors, which was released in the UK on November 11 that year.

== Reception ==
=== Box office ===
The film earned $1.5 million from 27 theaters in its opening weekend, with a per-screen average of $56,002. The film expanded nationwide in its third weekend and grossed $29.2 million from 1,101 locations, placing at number two in the United States box office, behind only Runaway Bride. The film expanded further to 2,142 theaters and again finished in second place with a gross of $24.3 million in its fourth weekend, behind The Sixth Sense. The film dropped out of the top-ten list in its 10th weekend and by the end of its theatrical run, the film grossed $140.5 million in the US and Canada and grossed $108.1 million in other territories, for a worldwide gross of $248.6 million (over 4,000 times its original budget). It became the highest-grossing film to be picked up at a film festival, until it was surpassed by Obsession in 2026. The Blair Witch Project was the 10th highest-grossing film in the United States in 1999, and has earned the reputation of becoming a sleeper hit. In Italy it set an opening weekend record for a US film.

Because the filming was done by the actors using hand-held cameras, much of the footage is shaky, especially the final sequence in which a character is running down a set of stairs with the camera. Some audience members experienced motion sickness and vomited as a result.

=== Critical response ===
At a time when digital techniques can show us almost anything, The Blair Witch Project is a reminder that what really scares us is the stuff we can't see. The noise in the dark is almost always scarier than what makes the noise in the dark.

— Roger Ebert, writing for the Chicago Sun-Times

The Blair Witch Project drew acclaim from critics. The review aggregation website Rotten Tomatoes gives the film a score of 86% based on 176 reviews from critics, with an average rating of 7.9/10. The website's consensus reads: "Full of creepy campfire scares, mock-doc The Blair Witch Project keeps audiences in the dark about its titular villain, proving once more that imagination can be as scary as anything onscreen." On Metacritic the film received a weighted average of 80 out of 100 based on 33 critics, indicating "generally positive reviews". Audience reception to the film, though, remains divided; those polled by CinemaScore gave it an average grade of "C+" on a scale of A+ to F.

The Blair Witch Project's found-footage technique received near-universal praise. Although this was not the first film to use it, the independent film was declared a milestone in film history due to its critical and box office success. Roger Ebert of the Chicago Sun-Times gave the film four stars, and called it "an extraordinarily effective horror film". Peter Travers of Rolling Stone called it "a groundbreaker in fright that reinvents scary for the new millennium". Todd McCarthy of Variety said: "An intensely imaginative piece of conceptual filmmaking that also delivers the goods as a dread-drenched horror movie, The Blair Witch Project puts a clever modern twist on the universal fear of the dark and things that go bump in the night". Lisa Schwarzbaum of Entertainment Weekly gave a grade of "B": "As a horror picture, the film may not be much more than a cheeky game, a novelty with the cool, blurry look of an avant-garde artifact. But as a manifestation of multimedia synergy, it's pretty spooky".

Some critics were less enthusiastic. Andrew Sarris of The New York Observer deemed it "overrated", as well as a rendition of "the ultimate triumph of the Sundance scam: Make a heartless home movie, get enough critics to blurb in near unison 'scary' and watch the suckers flock to be fleeced". A critic from The Christian Science Monitor said that while the film's concept and scares were innovative, he felt it could have just been shot "as a 30-minute short ... since its shaky camera work and fuzzy images get monotonous after a while, and there's not much room for character development within the very limited plot". R. L. Schaffer of IGN scored it two out of ten, and described it as "boring – really boring", and "a Z-grade, low-rent horror outing with no real scares into a genuine big-budget spectacle".

=== Accolades, awards and nominations ===
At the 1st Golden Trailer Awards, it received a nomination for Most Original Trailer and won two categories: Best Horror/Thriller and Best Voice Over. At the 15th Independent Spirit Awards, The Blair Witch Project won the John Cassavetes Award (for best first feature made for under $500,000). The 20th Golden Raspberry Awards gave Heather Donahue its Worst Actress award, and nominated producers Robin Cowie and Gregg Hale for the Worst Picture award. At the Stinkers Bad Movie Awards, the film won the Biggest Disappointment category and received three nominations: Worst Picture (Cowie and Hale), Worst Actress (Donahue), and Worst Screen Debut (Heather, Michael, Josh, the Stick People and the world's longest running batteries).

== Legacy ==
An array of other films have relied on the found-footage concept and shown influence by The Blair Witch Project. These include Paranormal Activity (2007), REC (2007), Cloverfield (2008), The Last Exorcism (2010), Trollhunter (2010), Chronicle (2012), Project X (2012), V/H/S (2012), End of Watch (2012),, and The Den (2013). Outside of America, the film has inspired found footage films such as the Japanese Noroi: The Curse (2005) and the South Korean Gonjiam: Haunted Asylum (2018).

Some critics have also noted that the film's basic plot premise and narrative style are strikingly similar to Cannibal Holocaust (1980) and The Last Broadcast (1998). Cannibal Holocaust director Ruggero Deodato has acknowledged the similarities of The Blair Witch Project to his film, and criticized the publicity that it received for being an original production; advertisements for The Blair Witch Project also promoted the idea that the footage is genuine. Despite initial reports that The Last Broadcast creators—Stefan Avalos and Lance Weiler—had alleged that The Blair Witch Project was a complete rip-off of their work and would sue Haxan Films for copyright infringement, they repudiated these allegations. One of the creators told IndieWire in 1999: "If somebody enjoys The Blair Witch Project there is a chance they will enjoy our film, and we hope they will check it out."

In 2017, the Library of Congress described how The Blair Witch Project "established a new type of documentary psychological horror genre [...] One of the key elements to the film’s success was the creation of a rich fictitious history, which has become the template for modern horror film screenplay writing." Film critic Michael Dodd has argued that the film is an embodiment of horror "modernizing its ability to be all-encompassing in expressing the fears of American society". He noted that "in an age where anyone can film whatever they like, horror needn't be a cinematic expression of what terrifies the cinema-goer, it can simply be the medium through which terrors captured by the average American can be showcased."

In 2008, The Blair Witch Project was ranked by Entertainment Weekly as number ninety-nine on their list of 100 Best Films from 1983 to 2008. In 2006, the Chicago Film Critics Association ranked it as number 12 on their list of Top 100 Scariest Movies. It was ranked number 50 on Filmcritic.com's list of 50 Best Movie Endings of All Time. In 2016, it was ranked by IGN as number 21 on their list of Top 25 Horror Movies of All Time, number 16 on Cosmopolitan's 25 Scariest Movies of All Time, and number three on The Hollywood Reporter's 10 Scariest Movies of All Time. In 2013, the film also made the top-ten list of The Hollywood Reporter's highest-grossing independent films of all time, ranking number six.

Director Eli Roth has cited the film as a marketing influence to promote his 2002 horror film Cabin Fever with the internet. The Blair Witch Project was included in the book 1001 Movies You Must See Before You Die.

After the film was released, in late November 1999, the historic house where it was filmed was reportedly being overwhelmed by film fans who broke off chunks as souvenirs. The township ordered the house demolished the next month.

=== Media tie-ins ===
==== Books ====
In September 1999, D. A. Stern compiled The Blair Witch Project: A Dossier. Building on the film's "true story" angle, the dossier consisted of fictional police reports, pictures, interviews, and newspaper articles presenting the film's premise as fact, as well as further elaboration on the Elly Kedward and Rustin Parr legends. Another "dossier" was created for Blair Witch 2. Stern wrote the 2000 novel Blair Witch: The Secret Confessions of Rustin Parr. He revisited the franchise with the novel Blair Witch: Graveyard Shift, which features original characters and plot.

A series of eight young adult books, titled The Blair Witch Files, were released by Random subsidiary Bantam from 2000 to 2001. The books center on Cade Merill, a fictional cousin of Heather Donahue, who investigates phenomena related to the Blair Witch. She tries to learn what really happened to Heather, Mike, and Josh.

==== Comic books ====
In July 1999, Oni Press released a one-shot comic promoting the film, titled The Blair Witch Project #1. Written and illustrated by Cece Malvey, the comic was released in conjunction of the film. In October 2000, coinciding with the release of Book of Shadows: Blair Witch 2, Image Comics released a one-shot called Blair Witch: Dark Testaments, drawn by Charlie Adlard.

==== Video games ====
In 2000, Gathering of Developers released a trilogy of computer games based on the film, which greatly expanded on the myths first suggested in the film. The graphics engine and characters were all derived from the producer's earlier game Nocturne.

The first volume, Rustin Parr, received the most praise, ranging from moderate to positive, with critics commending its storyline, graphics and atmosphere; some reviewers claimed that the game was scarier than the film. The following volumes, The Legend of Coffin Rock and The Elly Kedward Tale, were less well received, with PC Gamer saying that Volume 2's "only saving grace was its cheap price", and calling Volume 3 "amazingly mediocre".

Bloober Team developed Blair Witch, a first-person survival horror game based on the Blair Witch franchise. The game was released on August 30, 2019.

==== Documentary ====
The Woods Movie (2015) is a feature-length documentary exploring the production of The Blair Witch Project. For this documentary, director Russ Gomm interviewed the original film's producer, Gregg Hale, and directors Eduardo Sánchez and Daniel Myrick.

=== Parodies ===
The Blair Witch Project inspired a number of parody films, including Scary Movie, Da Hip Hop Witch, The Bogus Witch Project, The Dairy Witch, The Tony Blair Witch Project (all in 2000), The Blair Rabbit Project (2022) and The Blair Thumb (2001), as well as the pornographic films The Erotic Witch Project and The Bare Wench Project. The film also inspired the Halloween television special The Scooby-Doo Project, which aired during a Scooby-Doo, Where Are You! marathon on Cartoon Network on October 31, 1999. 2013's 6-5=2 was also inspired by this film.

== Sequels and reboot ==
A sequel titled Book of Shadows was released on October 27, 2000; it was poorly received by most critics. A third installment announced that same year did not materialize.

At San Diego Comic-Con in July 2016, a surprise trailer for Blair Witch was revealed. The film was originally marketed as The Woods so as to be an exclusive surprise announcement for those in attendance at the convention. The film, distributed by Lionsgate, was slated for a September 16 release and stars James Allen McCune as the brother of the original film's Heather Donahue. Directed by Adam Wingard, Blair Witch is a direct sequel to The Blair Witch Project, and does not acknowledge the events of Book of Shadows: Blair Witch 2. However, Wingard has said that although his version does not reference any of the events that transpired in Book of Shadows, the film does not necessarily discredit the existence of Book of Shadows: Blair Witch 2. Screenwriter Simon Barrett explained that in writing the new film, he only considered material that was produced with the involvement of the original film's creative team (directors Daniel Myrick and Eduardo Sánchez, producer Gregg Hale, and production designer Ben Rock) to be "canon", and that he did not take any material produced without their direct involvement—such as the first sequel Book of Shadows or The Blair Witch Files, a series of young adult novels—into consideration when writing the new sequel.

In April 2022, Lionsgate was looking to reboot The Blair Witch Project with a new installment. A new installment of The Blair Witch Project is officially in development at Lionsgate with Jason Blum and Roy Lee producing as of April 2024. In April 2026, it was confirmed that Dylan Clark would be directing the film from a script by Chris Thomas Devlin. Clark is an "up-and-coming filmmaker" whose 2022 short film, Portrait of God, was being turned into a feature produced by Sam Raimi and Jordan Peele. In June 2026, a release date was set for September 24, 2027.

== Television ==
In October 2017, co-director Eduardo Sánchez revealed that he and the rest of the film's creative team were developing a Blair Witch television series, though he clarified that any decisions would ultimately be up to Lionsgate now which owns the rights to it. The series was later announced to be released on the studio's new subsidiary, Studio L, which specializes in digital releases. The series, however, as of 2026, has never materialized.

== See also ==
- List of cult films
- List of ghost films
- List of films set around Halloween
- List of films about witchcraft
