= Blair Witch (film) =

2016 film by Adam Wingard

- Theatrical release poster
- Directed by: Adam Wingard
- Written by: Simon Barrett
- Produced by: Roy Lee; Steven Schneider; Keith Calder; Jess Calder
- Starring: James Allen McCune; Callie Hernandez; Brandon Scott; Corbin Reid; Valorie Curry; Wes Robinson
- Cinematography: Robby Baumgartner
- Edited by: Louis Cioffi
- Music by: Adam Wingard
- Production companies: Lionsgate; Vertigo Entertainment; Room 101, Inc.; Snoot Entertainment
- Distributed by: Lionsgate
- Release dates: July 22, 2016 (San Diego Comic-Con); September 16, 2016 (United States)
- Running time: 89 minutes
- Country: United States
- Language: English
- Budget: $5 million
- Box office: $45.2 million

Blair Witch is a 2016 American found footage supernatural horror film directed by Adam Wingard and written by Simon Barrett. It is the third film in the Blair Witch series and a direct sequel to The Blair Witch Project (1999). It ignores the non-found footage follow-up Book of Shadows: Blair Witch 2 (2000), whose events comprise a film within a film. (Note: In the 2000 tie-in "documentary" to Book of Shadows: Blair Witch 2, Shadow of the Blair Witch, the events of Book of Shadows: Blair Witch 2 are presented in-universe as a film adaptation based on the "Black Hills murders" that took place shortly after the events of The Blair Witch Project. This documentary presents the events of Book of Shadows: Blair Witch 2 as a film within a film. Shadow of the Blair Witch follows the "real" Jeff Patterson’s defense team as the case prepares for trial and as the public reacts to plans to fictionalize the case’s events for the big screen from the defense's point-of-view. Protests of the film Book of Shadows: Blair Witch 2 are discussed within the documentary coming from both the families of those involved with the case and from the Wiccan community as a whole. Rachel Moskowitz and Andre Brooks respectively portray the "real" Kim Diamond and Jeffrey Patterson within the documentary.) It stars James Allen McCune, Callie Hernandez, Brandon Scott, Corbin Reid, Valorie Curry and Wes Robinson. The film follows a group of college students and their local guides who venture into the Black Hills Forest in Maryland to uncover the mysteries surrounding the prior disappearance of Heather Donahue, the sister of one of the characters.

Development of the film began in 2009, when creators of the franchise Daniel Myrick and Eduardo Sánchez announced their intent to produce a third Blair Witch film. It was to be a sequel to the first film, whose cast it could feature in some context, and not refer to any of the events from Book of Shadows. In 2011, Sánchez remarked that further development on a sequel depended on getting Lionsgate to approve the idea and for his and Myrick's schedule to match up. The film went into development hell, and later the script was thrown aside. In 2013, a third Blair Witch film was again in talks, with Wingard and Barrett being hired to work on a new script. Initially, the film's connection to the Blair Witch franchise was kept secret, having been shot under the fake title The Woods. Its true title was revealed at the 2016 San Diego Comic-Con.

Blair Witch premiered at San Diego Comic-Con on July 22, 2016 and was screened at the Toronto International Film Festival on September 11, before being theatrically released in the United States on September 16, by Lionsgate. The film received mixed reviews and despite grossing $45 million against a budget of $5 million, it was considered a box office disappointment.

== Plot ==
In 2014, James Donahue finds a video on YouTube containing an image of a woman he believes to be his sister Heather, who disappeared in 1994 near Burkittsville, Maryland, while investigating the legend of the Blair Witch. Wanting to find out the truth, he travels to the woods with friend Peter Jones, Peter's girlfriend Ashley Bennett and film student Lisa Arlington, who wants to film James' search as a documentary, The Absence of Closure. Locals Talia and Lane, who had uploaded the video to YouTube, say they will show the group the location of the tape only if they can join.

Ashley injures her foot while crossing a river. Upon setting up camp for the night, Lane and Talia discuss the disappearance of Heather and her crew, the 1940–41 Rustin Parr murders and other mysterious occurrences, which they ascribe to the Blair Witch. Lane explains the witch had not been abandoned on a tree to die, instead tied high up with weights on her limbs to act as a makeshift torture rack.

Strange noises ensue during the night. Everyone awakes at 2 p.m. and sees strange stick figures hanging from trees. Upon Lisa noticing twine in Lane's backpack, he and Talia admit to creating the figures to convince them to believe in the curse. However, they are not able to give explanations for the prior incidents. Upset at their lies, James and his associates banish Lane and Talia from the group and head out of the woods.

After hours of walking, the four have circled back at their original campsite. Ashley's wounded foot and overall health have worsened, which forces the group to stay at the site. Lisa pilots a drone to obtain their location, but from its vantage point they see no way out of the forest. When Peter inspects Ashley's foot, the wound spasms, indicating a potential parasite inside. Peter leaves to collect firewood before being chased by an unknown entity. A tree falls on him and he is dragged away off-screen.

Lane and Talia appear, claiming they have been wandering for five days without a sunrise. Lane, believing the camp to be a hallucination, runs off and leaves behind the disheveled and ravenously hungry Talia. Lisa and James awake at 7 a.m., seeing that it is still dark outside and that larger stick figures have been strung around camp. Talia sees clumps of her hair tied to one of the figures. Ashley accuses her of crafting them and snaps the figure in half; Talia is snapped in half. An unseen force lifts their tent into the sky and the group is separated.

Ashley climbs a tree to recover the drone, but she is pushed out and falls to the ground. An unknown entity drags her away. A rainstorm begins. Lisa and James stumble across Rustin Parr's house, despite James stating it had been burned down. James, thinking he hears Heather's screams inside, enters without Lisa. He chases after a teleporting disheveled figure, believing it to be Heather; after it vanishes, he barricades himself.

Lisa, terrified after seeing a tall, pale, long-limbed creature, runs inside the house. A hostile Lane traps her in a tunnel, insisting she listens to what "she" tells her. After Lisa escapes, Lane attacks her and she stabs and kills him. The creature emerges from the tunnel and chases her. She runs to the attic with Lane's camcorder, passing a mirror that shows Heather, revealing the tape found by Lane was being recorded by Lisa, creating a paradox video that lured them all into the woods. (Note: Early on in the film, as the group makes its way into the woods, Lisa asks Lane about his camera, an older model that she notes uses the exact same tape as the one he claims to have found. The footage Lisa records on Lane's camera while running through the shack is the same footage Lane found in the woods before the group ever actually went there, implying that they have been caught in a time loop.)

She reunites with James in the attic as a bright light shines from outside the building. James tells Lisa to face the corner, frantically apologizing before something barges into the room. The being tricks James, using Heather's voice to make him turn around, and he vanishes from sight. Lisa realizes looking at the creature will ensure her death, so she uses Lane's camcorder to look behind her. She catches a glimpse of the creature behind her and starts walking backwards. The creature uses James' voice, stating, "Lisa, I'm so sorry", and Lisa turns, immediately getting snatched away. Her camcorder falls to the ground and gives out.

== Cast ==
- James Allen McCune as James Donahue, Heather Donahue's young brother.
- Callie Hernandez as Lisa Arlington
- Brandon Scott as Peter Jones
- Corbin Reid as Ashley Bennett
- Valorie Curry as Talia
- Wes Robinson as Lane

== Production ==
=== Development ===
While promoting V/H/S/2 (2013) at the Sundance Film Festival, director Adam Wingard and writer Simon Barrett ran into original The Blair Witch Project (1999) co-filmmaker Eduardo Sánchez and producer Gregg Hale, and asked them why there were not any more Blair Witch films. Although nothing came of the meeting at the time, a few months later, Wingard and Barrett were asked to meet with Lionsgate Films to potentially work on a secret project. Barrett recalled that, in the initial pitch meeting, Lionsgate had already crafted a story for a new Blair Witch film, and simply asked if they would be interested in making it. Barrett said that the "only thing I really pitched was the other characters; they'd originally conceived the film as more similar to the first film, following its narrative fairly closely, with only three or four characters, I think, but I wanted more characters to give us more scare sequences. I also wanted a unique dynamic within the group from the start, so I pitched the idea of introducing some Burkittsville locals to the group".

Barrett would later note that the team found the found footage genre more challenging, as they have only previously worked with it on the anthology V/H/S films. Barrett noted that with the V/H/S series, there was an inherent entertainment value, where the segments "were never meant to feel entirely real", an element that did not work for the Blair Witch series. Speaking on the issue to Bloody Disgusting, Barrett said that "even if our scares didn't work in V/H/S, hopefully people would still be entertained, and if they weren't, well, another short would start in a few minutes"; he added that if a scare did not work in Blair Witch, "we'd have nothing to fall back on, we'd just have failed completely, and publicly". To prevent this from happening, Barrett and Wingard extensively went over each "scare" to discover why it was scary and how the audience would react to it. For some sequences, multiple approaches were tried differently, to give them options in the editing room.

=== Filming ===
Principal photography took place in the spring of 2015, in a set of woods in British Columbia in Canada. Scenes taking place in the famous Blair Witch House were shot in a sound stage where the House was entirely rebuilt.

=== Connections to The Blair Witch Project ===
Prior to the film's premiere at the 2016 San Diego Comic-Con, the fact that the film was a Blair Witch sequel remained a closely guarded secret, as the film was shot under the title The Woods. According to the film's writer, Barrett, the film's secrecy was done to prevent backlash among Internet commenters, who the filmmakers felt would react negatively to news of a reboot.

Prior to the official premiere, Lionsgate went as far as to release a trailer for the film incorporating actual footage, while still keeping the film's lineage a secret. The film was still publicly known as The Woods at Comic-Con, prior to its first screening, with io9 reporting that the initial theater for the screening was filled with posters for the fake film. After the screening (during which audiences realized that the film was a sequel), all the promotional material in the theater was changed to reflect the film's actual title.

== Release ==
Blair Witch premiered at San Diego Comic-Con on July 22, 2016, and was screened at the Toronto International Film Festival on September 11, before being theatrically released on September 16, by Lionsgate Films.

== Reception ==
=== Box office ===
Blair Witch grossed $20.8 million in North America and $24.4 million in other territories, for a worldwide total of $45.2 million, against a production budget of $5 million.

In the United States and Canada, the film was released on September 16, 2016, and was initially projected to gross at least $20 million with a chance to get as high as $26 million in its opening weekend, from 3,121 theaters. Lionsgate's expectations were more conservative, however, with a projected $15–18 million opening. After grossing $765,000 from its Thursday previews and $4.1 million on its first day, opening projections were lowered to $10 million. It ended up grossing $9.7 million in its opening weekend, below expectations and the lowest opening weekend of the series. The film was considered a box office disappointment by analysts.

The film received a day-and-date release in many countries in conjunction with its North American debut.

The film cost $5 million to produce, with an additional $20 million spent on promotion, advertising and marketing costs.

=== Critical response ===
Blair Witch received mixed reviews, with critics noting it as an improvement on Book of Shadows while criticizing the writing and special effects. On Rotten Tomatoes, the film has an approval rating of 38% based on 226 reviews, with an average rating of 5.30/10. The site's critical consensus reads: "Blair Witch doles out a handful of effective scares, but aside from a few new twists, it mainly offers a belated rehash of the original – and far more memorable – first film". On Metacritic, the film has a weighted average score of 47 out of 100, based on 41 critics. Audiences polled by CinemaScore gave the film an average grade of "D+" on an A+ to F scale. According to Entertainment Weekly's Joey Nolfi, while Blair Witch is generally regarded as an improvement over Book of Shadows: Blair Witch 2, "moviegoers and film journalists essentially told [Blair Witch] to stand in the corner... critical reviews and audience exit polling... are still some of the worst of any 2016 release thus far".

Michael Roffman of Consequence of Sound wrote that "nothing [about the film] is scary, nothing is remotely disturbing, and there's this boring familiarity to the proceedings, namely because it's more or less a beat-by-beat remake of the original". The Hollywood Reporter's Leslie Felperin criticized the film, commenting that it is "a dull retread rather than a full-on reinvention", enlarging the cast numbers this time but sticking to the same basic beats. Scott Tobias of GQ felt that the makers of Blair Witch made a poor decision by making the film less subtle than the original. Thomas Simpson of the Rock River Times said that the film "lacks any real scares" and that, after watching it, "you shouldn't have any issues turning the light off at night".

Josh Kurp of Uproxx gave the film a mixed review, saying that "Blair Witch is scary, but it lacks surprise, and without surprise, you're left with a bunch of kind-of annoying people shakily filming themselves wandering the woods and reacting to loud noises". Mark Kermode gave the film three out of five stars in a review for The Guardian, calling it efficient but unadventurous. Vanity Fair's Jordan Hoffman felt that the film was inferior to You're Next, a previous film by Wingard and writer Simon Barrett, and said that Blair Witch's "jump-scares [will] make for a fun night at the movies, but it's like chomping on White Castle hamburgers—when this creative team has previously served us a prime rib".

Conversely, IGN reviewer Chris Tilly declared that Blair Witch is "so good it'll make you forget that Book of Shadows ever happened". Mark Eccleston of Glamour wrote that the film has "genuine, jarring scares... and an unsettling late surprise that makes it well worth popping to you nearest multiplex to have the holy crap scared out of you". Bloody Disgusting's Brad Miska, who had previously produced the film V/H/S which Wingard co-directed, was positive to the film and gave it a 4.5 out of five rating, and included it in his list of the "Best Horror Films of 2016".

== Soundtrack ==
Blair Witch (Original Motion Picture Soundtrack)

Studio album by Adam Wingard
- Released: September 16, 2016
- Recorded: January 23, 2016
- Genres: Stage & Screen
- Length: 32:20
- Label: Lakeshore Records

The soundtrack was released on September 16, 2016, via Lakeshore Records, concurrent with the film's release. The score was composed by director Wingard and produced by electronic music producer Robert Rich.

1. "Black Hills Forest"
2. "Rustin Parr"
3. "Camp Fire"
4. "Panic Attack"
5. "Blair Witch"
6. "Lane and Talia"
7. "The Project"
8. "Invocation of Evil"
9. "No Trespassing"
10. "The House in the Woods"

Additional music

1. "Hakmarrja" – N.K.V.D
2. "Pagan Dance Move" – Arnaud Rebotini
3. "Rien à Paris" – Liz & László

== Future ==
In April 2022, Lionsgate announced they were considering a reboot of the series. In June 2026, Lionsgate announced a release date of September 24, 2027 for the reboot film, titled The Blair Witch Project. Dylan Clark was reported to be directing, with the screenplay written by Chris Thomas Devlin.

== See also ==
- List of films featuring drones
