= Kim Director =

American actress

- Occupation: Film/television actress
- Years active: 1998–present

Kim Director is an American actress. She has played the roles of Kim Diamond in Book of Shadows: Blair Witch 2 (2000), and Stevie in Inside Man (2006). She appeared as a recurring guest star on the HBO series The Deuce (2017–2019).

== Early life ==
Raised in suburban Pittsburgh, Pennsylvania, Director graduated from Upper St. Clair High School in Upper St. Clair in 1993. She graduated from Carnegie Mellon University in 1997.

== Career ==
Director's first film role was in 1998's He Got Game, directed by Spike Lee. This was followed by Summer of Sam in 1999 and Bamboozled in 2000, both films also directed by Lee. Her breakout performance came in the film Book of Shadows: Blair Witch 2 as the hard-core Goth girl, Kim Diamond. She went on to act in the independent films Unforeseen, Tony n' Tina's Wedding, Charlie's Party, Live Free or Die, Life is Short, and A Crime with Harvey Keitel. Director reunited with Spike Lee for the film She Hate Me in 2004, and in 2006 played Stevie the bank robber in Lee's Inside Man.

Kim Director has appeared in guest roles on television shows Sex and the City, Law & Order, Law & Order: Criminal Intent, CSI: Miami, Shark, Life, Cold Case, Unforgettable, and Orange is the New Black. She had a recurring role as the Cavewoman on the series Cavemen.

Her later roles include HBO's The Deuce and the Bianca in the Netflix series She's Gotta Have It.

== Filmography ==
=== Film ===
| Year | Title | Role | Notes |
|---|---|---|---|
| 1998 | He Got Game | Lynn | |
| 1999 | Summer of Sam | Dee | |
| 2000 | Bamboozled | Starlet | |
| 2000 | Blair Witch WebFest | Kim | |
| 2000 | Book of Shadows: Blair Witch 2 | Kim Diamond | |
| 2002 | Unforeseen | The Cashier | |
| 2004 | Tony n' Tina's Wedding | Connie | |
| 2004 | She Hate Me | Grace | |
| 2005 | Charlie's Party | Zoe Fields | |
| 2006 | Live Free or Die | Donna | |
| 2006 | Inside Man | Valerie Keepsake / Stevie | |
| 2006 | Life Is Short | Erin | Short film |
| 2006 | A Crime | Ashley Harris | |
| 2010 | Errand_boy | Bobbi | Short film |
| 2014 | The Last American Guido | Rose Michelle | |
| 2016 | Detours | Grace Giraldi | |
| 2016 | Delinquent | Officer Reynolds | |
| 2017 | The Super | Teacher | |
| 2018 | Homecoming Revenge | Andrea | Lifetime TV film |
| 2020 | Death Rider in the House of Vampires | Carmilla Joe | |

=== Television ===
| Year | Title | Role | Notes |
|---|---|---|---|
| 2001 | Law & Order | The Waitress | Episode: "Bronx Cheer" |
| 2003 | Sex and the City | Gracie | Episode: "The Post-it Always Sticks Twice" |
| 2004 | Law & Order | Young Female Undercover Cop | Episode: "Coming Down Hard" |
| 2005 | Law & Order: Criminal Intent | Jocelyn Shapiro / Lori Purcell | Episode: "Collective" |
| 2006 | CSI: Miami | Gloria Williams | Episode: "Rampage" |
| 2006 | Shark | Veronica Dale | Episode: "Dial M for Monica" |
| 2007–2008 | Cavemen | Heather | Three episodes |
| 2008 | Life | Cheryl Price | Episode: "Find Your Happy Place" |
| 2008 | Cold Case | Marisa D'Amico | Episode: "The Dealer" |
| 2012 | Unforgettable | Kate Jordan | Episode: "The Following Sea" |
| 2012 | Erroneous Convictions | Jessica Kraft | Episode: "Pilot" |
| 2013 | Orange Is the New Black | Diane Vause | Episode: "Fucksgiving" |
| 2014 | The Good Wife | Angela Moretti | Episode: "Parallel Construction, Bitches" |
| 2014 | Gotham | Lacey White | Episode: "Spirit of the Goat" |
| 2016 | Elementary | Beth Stone | Episode: "Render, and Then Seize Her" |
| 2017–2019 | The Deuce | Laila Brody / Shay | Recurring |
| 2017–2019 | She's Gotta Have It | Bianca Tate | Recurring |
| 2020 | Little America | Lydia | Episode: "The Silence" |
| 2020 | NOS4A2 | Sasha | Episode: "Good Father" |
| 2022 | Queens | Trish Pierce | Episode: "I'm a Slave 4 U" |
| 2022 | Bridge and Tunnel | Gina Pagnetti | Recurring |
| 2022 | Blue Bloods | Arrina | Episode: "First Blush" |
