= Blair Witch Volume III: The Elly Kedward Tale =

2000 video game

- Developer: Ritual Entertainment
- Publishers: NA: Gathering of Developers; EU: Take-Two Interactive
- Series: Blair Witch
- Platform: Microsoft Windows
- Release: NA: 20 November 2000; EU: 12 January 2001
- Genre: Survival horror
- Mode: Single-player

Blair Witch Volume III: The Elly Kedward Tale is a 2000 survival horror video game and the final part of the trilogy developed by Ritual Entertainment for Microsoft Windows. The first two games of this trilogy are Blair Witch Volume I: Rustin Parr and Blair Witch Volume II: The Legend of Coffin Rock.

== Plot ==
The final episode of the trilogy is an original story that was not mentioned in the film. The story focuses on how the Blair Witch legend came to be. The game is set in 1785, in the early days of the Blair Township (later renamed Burkittsville). The story's main character is Jonathan Prye, a former priest who left the clergy during a crisis of faith. Prye, now a witch-hunter, is called to Blair to investigate events related to the disappearance of a woman called Elly Kedward a few weeks earlier.

Elly Kedward was accused of witchcraft after it was found she had been drawing blood from the local children and performing pagan rituals. She was tried, convicted and sentenced to be banished from the town. Instead, the locals tied her to a wheelbarrow, dragged her into the nearby woods and left her to freeze to death. Kedward disappeared from the wheelbarrow to which she was tied, and was never seen again.

A few days later, children from the township began to disappear, and the terrified villagers began to flee — with only the local magistrate, Jonah, and the township's chaplain, Father Hale Goodfellow, remaining behind. Father Goodfellow is convinced that a supernatural force is at work; Jonah, a skeptic, refuses to believe this, assuming Kedward is behind the kidnappings and is still at large near the town. There are also two people who are locked in a jail in the town: Hirrum Heathtow is a drunk, and Elizabeth Styler is a supposed witch who was arrested when she was found in Elly's house, reciting strange phrases.

The player must guide Prye through his investigation, to discover what happened to Elly Kedward. In his search, he happens upon a child having been bound and tortured in the forest. After freeing the child, a voice warns him not to interfere before sending zombies onto him. In the forest, Prye meets a shaman by the name of Asgaya Gigagei, who tells him of the legend of Hecaitomix, an evil spirit once worshipped by the natives before white settlers first arrived. Angered that he's no longer revered, Hecaitomix plans to destroy the human race and conquer the world. Prye learns that Hecaitomix has abducted a number of children for sacrificial murder, and makes it his quest to rescue them.

Prye's journey not only takes him throughout the woods, but into the spirit realm which Hecaitomix conquered, and the demonic realm which he already rules. While rescuing Hecaitomix's hostages and facing his minions, Prye eventually faces Hecaitomix himself, with Asgaya's help. After escaping Hecaitomix's realm, Prye encounters Styler, who reveals herself to be a servant and vessel of Hecaitomix. The two fight, with Prye managing to defeat her (either by killing her or exorcising the demon from her body).

If Styler is killed, Prye is thanked by the townspeople for having rescued the children and is offered a job as a constable, which Prye declines, having regained his faith and returns to his church to resume his previous position. Exorcising Styler results in a different ending where she returns to her senses and thanks Prye, explaining that she had been under the demon's influence all throughout the story. She asks Prye to come with her, hinting at a romantic partnership. Prye declines, reaffirming his faith and desire to return to his flock. Prye and Styler share a goodbye and part ways.

== Reception ==
Reception

Aggregate score
Aggregator	Score
Metacritic	55/100

Review scores
Publication	Score
AllGame	2/5
CNET Gamecenter	4/10
Computer Games Strategy Plus	3.5/5
Computer Gaming World	1.5/5
EP Daily	8.5/10
Eurogamer	3/10
GameRevolution	C−
GameSpot	4/10
GameSpy	69%
IGN	6.8/10
Next Generation	2/5
PC Gamer (US)	37%

Blair Witch Volume III: The Elly Kedward Tale received "mixed or average" reviews, according to video game review aggregator Metacritic. Kevin Rice of NextGen said that the game was not scary or challenging, and only mildly entertaining.

The game sold 8,500 units in the U.S. by October 2001.
