= Blair Witch 2: Book of Shadows (score) =

2000 film soundtrack album

Blair Witch 2: Book Of Shadows (Original Motion Picture Score)

Soundtrack album by Carter Burwell
- Released: October 24, 2000
- Studios: The Body (New York City, New York)
- Genres: Electronic music; dark ambient
- Length: 40:35
- Label: Milan
- Producers: Daniel Myrick (exec.); Eduardo Sanchez (exec.); Emmanuel Chamboredon (exec.); Russell Ziecker (exec.); Gwen Bethel (exec.); Carter Burwell

Carter Burwell chronology
| Before Night Falls (2000) | Blair Witch 2: Book Of Shadows (Original Motion Picture Score) (2000) | A Knight's Tale (2001) |

Blair Witch 2: Book of Shadows is a film score by Carter Burwell, released through Milan/Flash Cut Records on October 24, 2000. The soundtrack was re-released in 2001 and bundled with the DVD+CD by Artisan Entertainment.

== Track listing ==
| No. | Title | Length |
|---|---|---|
| 1. | "Rock Water Wind" | 7:11 |
| 2. | "Funny Farm" | 1:49 |
| 3. | "Stream Dream" | 0:57 |
| 4. | "Red Snow" | 4:23 |
| 5. | "Wrong" | 1:00 |
| 6. | "Still in the Hills" | 1:07 |
| 7. | "Marked" | 2:56 |
| 8. | "Barely" | 2:44 |
| 9. | "Beasts" | 2:32 |
| 10. | "Rain" | 1:35 |
| 11. | "Hanging" | 3:25 |
| 12. | "Shadow Dance" | 2:58 |
| 13. | "The Truth?" | 7:58 |
| Total length: | | 40:35 |

== Release ==
The score was released on compact disc on October 24, 2000.

=== Critical response ===
Heather Phares of AllMusic wrote of the album: "Though this score isn't Burwell's best work, it still manages to create as much of an ominous, suspenseful air about the film as possible."
