= Blair Witch Volume II: The Legend of Coffin Rock =

2000 video game

- Developer: Human Head Studios
- Publishers: NA: Gathering of Developers; EU: Take-Two Interactive
- Director: Timothy S. Gerritsen
- Producer: Joshua Galloway
- Programmer: Matthew Sweeney
- Artist: Rowan Atalla
- Composers: Michael Larson; Rom Di Prisco
- Series: Blair Witch
- Platform: Microsoft Windows
- Release: NA: 25 October 2000; EU: 3 November 2000
- Genre: Survival horror
- Mode: Single-player

Blair Witch Volume II: The Legend of Coffin Rock is a 2000 survival horror video game developed by Human Head Studios for Microsoft Windows. It is a sequel to Blair Witch Volume I: Rustin Parr and was followed by Blair Witch Volume III: The Elly Kedward Tale.

== Development ==
The game went gold on October 16, 2000 and was released on 25 October 2000 in North America, and on 3 November in Europe.

== Reception ==
Reception

Aggregate score
Aggregator	Score
Metacritic	56/100

Review scores
Publication	Score
Computer Gaming World	1.5/5
Eurogamer	6/10
GamePro	3.5/5
GameRevolution	D
GameSpot	6.7/10
GameSpy	70%
GameZone	8/10
IGN	6.7/10
Next Generation	2/5
PC Gamer (US)	48%
ActionTrip	3.3/10

Blair Witch Volume II: The Legend of Coffin Rock received "mixed or average" reviews, according to review aggregator Metacritic. In the United States, it sold 16,000 copies by October 2001.

Daniel Erickson reviewed the PC version of the game for Next Generation, rating it two stars out of five, and called the game short and repetitive, and having a problematic camera control.
