= Rock River Times =

The Rock River Times
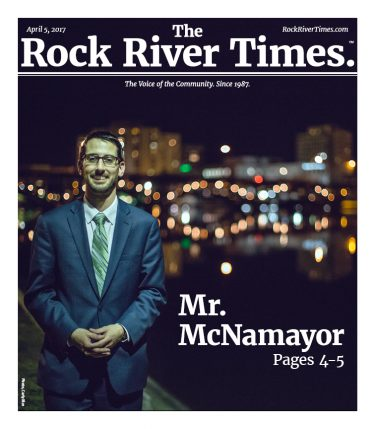
- The front page of The Rock River Times, April 5, 2017
- Type: Weekly newspaper
- Publisher: Josh Johnson
- Founded: 1987 (The North End Times)
- Headquarters: 2510 Charles St. Rockford, Illinois 61108; United States
- Circulation: 2,500
- Price: Free
- Website: rockrivertimes.com

The Rock River Times is an independently owned alternative weekly newspaper based in Rockford, Illinois with a circulation of about 2,500.

Distributed every Wednesday, The Rock River Times has been in publication since 1987. An electronic version of the publication is posted weekly on the paper's website.

== History ==
The Rock River Times began in 1987 as the monthly, The North End Times. The paper was acquired by Frank Schier in 1992 and rebranded with its current name in 1993. Weekly publication began in December 1993 and grew to a circulation of more than 20,000 over the next two decades.

Schier, who served as editor and publisher of the newspaper for more than 24 years, died in January 2017. The paper continued under publisher Josh Johnson, a former legals editor under Schier, who purchased the publication from his estate.

When Johnson bought the paper it had about 15 to 20 employees. Seven years later the paper's staff had been reduced over time to Johnson, a part-time salesperson and a number of freelance writers. In 2024, the newspaper moved offices after 30 years from 128 N. Church St. in downtown Rockford to the Rockford Plaza on Charles Street.

== Format ==
The Rock River Times weekly edition is currently printed in a tabloid format of 16-24 pages. Topics include local, state and national news and commentary, sports news, business news, and arts and entertainment news.

At the paper's peak, The Rock River Times consisted of as many as 56 pages and had a full staff of local reporters and editors. Today, there are no local reporters; the paper now serves as a legal-noice publication with mostly wire-generated news content.
