= Blair Witch Volume I: Rustin Parr =

2000 video game

- Developer: Terminal Reality
- Publishers: NA: Gathering; EU: Take-Two Interactive
- Director: Joe Wampole
- Designer: Joe Wampole
- Programmer: Mark Randel
- Writers: Joe Wampole; Jeff Mills; Peter Besson; William Haskins
- Composer: Kyle Richards
- Series: Blair Witch
- Platform: Microsoft Windows
- Release: NA: October 4, 2000; EU: October 6, 2000
- Genre: Survival horror
- Mode: Single-player

Blair Witch Volume I: Rustin Parr is a survival horror video game developed by Terminal Reality and released for Microsoft Windows in 2000. Two sequels titled Blair Witch Volume II: The Legend of Coffin Rock and Blair Witch Volume III: The Elly Kedward Tale were released subsequently. Rustin Parr itself is both a sequel to Nocturne, another game developed by Terminal Reality, and a crossover with the Blair Witch franchise. It features many of same characters as Nocturne while being set in the Blair Witch universe.

== Plot ==
The story takes place in the year 1941, and with the exception of the opening section in the Spookhouse HQ, the game takes place over four days. Following her training, research scientist Elspeth "Doc" Holliday is dispatched to the town of Burkittsville by the Spookhouse, a fictional classified government agency charged with investigating paranormal occurrences. When given the assignment to look into the legend of the Blair Witch, she is partnered with the Stranger, but decides to go on her own as the Stranger is skeptical of the witch's existence. It is reported that during the early 1940s, a hermit named Rustin Parr abducted eight children from Burkittsville and, apparently without motive, murdered all but one in his basement. The player must guide Holliday through her investigations, to see if there is any truth to Parr's claims that he was under the influence of otherworldly forces when he committed the murders.

== Reception ==
Reception

Aggregate score
Aggregator	Score
Metacritic	73/100

Review scores
Publication	Score
Adventure Gamers	2/5
AllGame	3.5/5
Eurogamer	9/10
Game Informer	6.75/10
GamePro	4/5
GameRevolution	B
GameSpot	7.1/10
GameSpy	92%
GameZone	8.3/10
IGN	6.8/10
Next Generation	2/5
PC Gamer (US)	70%
Maxim	8/10

Blair Witch Volume I: Rustin Parr received "mixed or average" reviews, according to review aggregator Metacritic. In the United States, Volume 1 sold 49,000 copies by October 2001.

GameSpot awarded the game a 7.1 out of ten, praising its atmosphere but calling its combat "mediocre". Eurogamer also highlights the game's atmosphere but said this about the game's length:

"Sadly, there is one big crux as far as Rustin Parr goes, and that's longevity. Like a film or book with a twist in the tail and an engrossing story-line, you can happily read it again and the odd bit here or there will make more sense, but you'll never get quite the same level of enjoyment out of it as you did before. Add to this the fact that Rustin Parr is over in what seems like an instant and you have cause for some alarm".

ActionTrip was more critical of the game and awarded it a 5.9 out of ten. Cited are its bad controls, problematic camera angles and its re-purposing of a classic adventure game engine (the Nocturne Engine) for a more action-oriented game. On the positive side of things, the author approved of the game's story and mood. AllGame described the game as "one of the scariest games you're likely to experience on the PC in the year 2000" but that the greatest drawback was the controls, saying that the players would have a difficulty to re-center the character, especially when fighting against undead creatures in the forest. He also criticised the game as short, taking only about ten hours to finish.

Jeff Lundrigan reviewed the PC version of the game for Next Generation, rating it two stars out of five, and called the game a short and occasionally frustrating adventure.

Rustin Parr was a nominee for GameSpot's 2000 "Best Adventure Game" award, which ultimately went to The Longest Journey.
