= Nocturne (video game) =

1999 video game

- Developer: Terminal Reality
- Publishers: NA: Gathering of Developers; EU: Take-Two Interactive
- Designer: Joe Wampole
- Programmer: Mark Randel
- Artists: Chris Burns; Chuck Carson; Rick Felice
- Writer: Paul Eckstein
- Composer: Kyle Richards
- Engine: Nocturne Engine
- Platform: Microsoft Windows
- Release: NA: October 28, 1999; EU: October 29, 1999; AU: November 19, 1999
- Genres: Action-adventure, survival horror
- Mode: Single-player

Nocturne is a 1999 action-adventure survival horror video game set in the late 1920s and early 1930s – the Prohibition and Great Depression era. The player takes the part of The Stranger (voiced by Lynn Mathis), an operative of a fictional American Government secret organization known as "Spookhouse", which was created by President Theodore Roosevelt to fight monsters. He investigates four strange cases and saves people from classic monsters such as werewolves, zombies, and vampires.

== Gameplay ==
Nocturne is a survival horror video game. It features pre-rendered backgrounds superimposed with real-time 3D characters. The controls are fairly standard for the genre, but controls for moving and aiming are separate. In addition, a weapon must be drawn before it may be used. Therefore, if The Stranger encounters an enemy, he must draw his weapon, aim, evade, then fire with separate controls.

== Plot ==
The Stranger returns from his unknown previous mission. His superior assigned him a new mission, along with a dhampir named Svetlana. The mission is to infiltrate a small village in Germany, to recover a relic that can grant every vampire who possess it immunity to their vampiric weakness. In the village, the mayor tells them that a vampire Count has the relic in a castle outside the village. During their journey to the castle, they witness strange occurrences, such as vampires attacking and killing each other rather than working together. After arriving, Svetlana suddenly becomes hostile and attacks The Stranger, before escaping inside the castle. After the count's servant tips off The Stranger that the count has mind-controlled Svetlana in order to groom her, The Stranger enters the castle and kills the Count after battling his minions and brides, returning Svetlana to normal. The village mayor suddenly appears in front of them, revealing that he was the Count's father. After the latter usurped him to become the Count, he, along with his loyal servants, flee to the village. They kill its previous inhabitants before pretending to be them. For ages, he battles the Count in order to retake the castle but to no avail. This explains the fighting between the vampires. He thanks the Stranger for killing his traitorous son, and promises not to abuse the relic. The Stranger and Svetlana leave with the Count's bride to-be, who is not turned into vampire.

In the next mission, The Stranger is asked to investigate the small town where the dead come back to life and attack the townspeople. While on board a train, The Stranger is suddenly ambushed by a pack of werewolves who have a grudge against The Stranger for killing members of their pack in the past. After killing the werewolves, The Stranger jumps off the train before it explodes. After meeting with his contact and the town's reverend, The Stranger battles the zombies and saves any survivors he finds. One of the survivors says that the zombies came from the abandoned mine in the town. Descending into the mine, The Stranger discovers that insectoid-like monsters are the source of the zombie outbreak. With the help from his contact, The Stranger manages to seal off the mine to prevent them coming up to the surface.

On the third mission, The Stranger is asked to destroy the factory run by Al Capone's gang that secretly created an army of undead gangsters. After meeting with the informant, Icepick, (one of the reanimated mobsters that went rogue) The Stranger infiltrates a movie theater to get the proof of Capone's factory. There, he is confronted by Smiley, the gang's enforcer. With the help from Icepick, The Stranger manages to kill him. Entering the factory, he meets Smiley for the second time, and kills him again. After sabotaging the factory, The Stranger attempts to escape the factory. He finds Smiley blocking the exit. The Stranger kills Smiley for good by dropping him into a vat of acid.

In the final mission, The Stranger is asked to help Killian Hammond, Spookhouse's former operative. In France, Killian requests The Stranger clean the graveyard of zombies and demons. While investigating the graveyard, The Stranger concludes that it is Killian who summons them. When he goes to his mansion to confront him, Killian subdues The Stranger and locks him in his dungeon. As The Stranger tries to make his way out of the dungeon, Killian taunts him and reveals the reason why he is doing this; he was forced to retire from Spookhouse, because of his hatred and disapproval towards supernatural creatures who join the ranks of the organization, ever since a vampire killed his wife. The Stranger also meets Moloch, a demonic member of Spookhouse who was declared missing. After freeing him and helping him recover his strength, The Stranger and Moloch escape the dungeon and confront Killian, who begs The Stranger to save him. The Stranger ignores his pleas and silently leaves the mansion as Moloch exacts his revenge on Killian. While debriefing The Stranger, the Colonel apologizes to him for his ordeal and what Killian became. He advises The Stranger not to let his distaste of monsters get the best of him if he doesn't want to end up like Killian. To this, The Stranger agrees.

In Epilogue, The Stranger enters Spookhouse's headquarters only to discovers that all of its staff are gruesomely mutilated. Shocked and confused, The Stranger enters the briefing room where he reads a message on the wall, written in blood that said, "I finally found you, Stranger!" as the screen fades to black.

== Development ==
The game was developed by a team of 13 people. According to Terminal Reality president Mark Randel, Nocturne is the first game with volumetric lighting and fogging.

== Reception ==
Reception

Aggregate score
Aggregator	Score
GameRankings	75%

Review scores
Publication	Score
CNET Gamecenter	6/10
Computer Gaming World	1.5/5
EP Daily	7.5/10
Eurogamer	9/10
Game Informer	6.25/10
GameFan	91%
GamePro	4/5
GameRevolution	C+
GameSpot	7/10
GameSpy	94%
IGN	7.4/10
Next Generation	2/5
PC Accelerator	8/10
PC Gamer (US)	56%

The game received favorable reviews according to the review aggregation website GameRankings. AllGame gave a very positive review of the game, giving it four-and-a-half stars out of five and stating that the graphics were "perhaps the best graphics ever for a 1999 PC title" and also praised gameplay, story and action. GameZone gave it 8.3 out of 10. Benjamin E. Sones of Computer Games Strategy Plus gave it four stars out of five, saying: "If you have the hardware to run it, Nocturne is an intensely unique and visually beautiful game that will draw you in and keep you coming back for more in spite of its shortcomings. Just make sure you play it at night, and keep a few sharpened stakes close at hand..." However, Jeff Lundrigan of NextGen gave it a negative review, calling the game as not terrible, but not terrifying either.

Camera angles were criticized. During gameplay, it is common to experience difficulty keeping track of the player/character, because the camera view can radically change when moving out of the current camera frame.

The game was a runner-up for Computer Games Strategy Plus' 1999 "Adventure Game of the Year" award. The staff wrote that the high system requirements provided impressive atmosphere for Alone in the Dark-styled horror romp. It won the 1999 "Adventure Game of the Year" prize from GameSpy, whose staff called it "the best adventure game [...] in a long time". It was also a runner-up for the "Best Graphics, Technical Excellence" award at GameSpot's Best & Worst of 1999 Awards, which went to Quake III Arena. The game was a runner-up for the "Best Sound" award at PC Accelerator's 2nd Annual PCXL Awards, while "The Stranger" won the Best Actor award. It won the award for "Coaster of the Year" Computer Gaming World's 2000 Hall of Shame.

The game sold 109,000 units in the U.S. by October 2001.

== Sequel ==
There is a partial sequel to Nocturne – a crossover between the Nocturne universe and The Blair Witch Project. The game, Blair Witch Volume I: Rustin Parr, is the first of a trilogy of Blair Witch games published by Gathering of Developers. The game stars the Spookhouse agent Elspeth "Doc" Holliday, who investigates the legend of the Blair Witch. The story's background involves an old hermit named Rustin Parr, who killed seven children in Burkittsville, claiming that he was doing it for an "old woman ghost". Spookhouse becomes interested in the case, and Doc is sent to investigate. The game was developed by Terminal Reality and uses the Nocturne Engine. Some other agents from Nocturne appear in the game. However, neither of the two following volumes in the series made any mention to the Spookhouse; although Elspeth and Volume III's protagonist meet during a temporal breach in Volume I, the scene is not present in Volume III. Both Volume II and III also use the Nocturne Engine.

Nocturne was heavily influential in the creation of Terminal Reality's BloodRayne game. The first BloodRayne game's working title was Nocturne 2, and it contains several references to Nocturne, including several levels that take place in the German castle from Nocturne's Act I. Nocturne 2 was not greenlit by Gathering of Developers, who went defunct soon after, and the developers, unwilling to share the Nocturne license with a new publisher they did not trust yet, decided to create a new franchise which "give[s] familiar nods to the Nocturne fans". The main protagonist of BloodRayne, the dhampir Rayne, is based upon the Nocturne character Svetlana Lupescu. Rayne's costume in the beta version even suggests she was originally supposed to be Svetlana. The "holy grail of the Vampires", the magical stone that can render a vampire invulnerable to most things that should normally harm him from Nocturne's Act I, is the heart of Beliar in BloodRayne.

The name Nocturne for use in video games remained under trademark, forcing Atlus to license it when releasing Shin Megami Tensei: Nocturne in North America, and for Ghostlight to change the subtitle to Lucifer's Call.
