= Michael C. Williams (actor) =

American actor (born 1973)

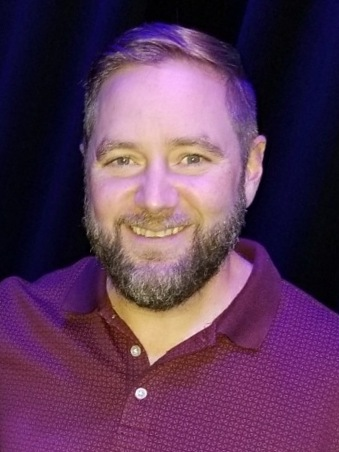
- Williams in 2019
- Born: July 25, 1973 (age 53); New York City, New York, U.S.
- Occupation: Actor
- Years active: 1999–present

Michael C. Williams (born July 25, 1973) is an American actor, best known for his role (using his own name) in the movie The Blair Witch Project. Williams also acted in the television program Law & Order during February 2000 as a man whose ex-wife killed their son. In 2008, Williams appeared in the movie The Objective.

== Early life ==
Williams was born in The Bronx borough of New York City. He attended Westlake High School in Thornwood, New York, and later graduated with a Bachelor of Arts degree in theatre arts from SUNY New Paltz, where he was a member of Kappa Sigma fraternity.

== Personal life ==
In 2007, Williams earned a Master's degree in school counseling, and began a career as a school guidance counselor in 2010.

In 2016, it was reported that Williams also served as the manager of the Big Blue Door Theater, based in Hawthorne, New York. As of 2023, Williams and his wife, Toni, also worked as theater directors at Westlake High School in Thornwood, New York.

== Filmography ==
=== Film ===
| Year | Title | Role | Notes |
|---|---|---|---|
| 1999 | The Blair Witch Project | Michael Williams | Nominated – Blockbuster Entertainment Award for Favorite Actor - Newcomer Nominated – Stinkers Bad Movie Award for Worst Screen Debut (shared with the cast) |
| 2000 | Sally | Lap | |
| 2002 | Twelve City Blocks | Gizmo | |
| 2002 | Long Story Short | Tommy | |
| 2006 | Altered | Otis | |
| 2007 | Montclair | Joel | |
| 2008 | The Objective | Sergeant Joe Trinoski | |
| 2009 | The Midnight Drive In Presents: Stay Out of the Woods | Deputy Cravens | Short film |
| 2021 | Grafton | Clifford Weldon | |
| 2022 | Satanic Hispanics | Dog Walker | |
| 2024 | Ghost Game | Pete | |

=== Television ===
| Year | Title | Role | Notes |
|---|---|---|---|
| 2000 | Law & Order | Jimmy Beltran | Episode: "Mother's Milk" |
| 2003 | Without a Trace | Brad | Episode: "There Goes the Bride" |
| 2009 | Law & Order: Special Victims Unit | Pete Rinaldi | Episode: "Snatched" |
| 2013 | Four Corners of Fear | Himself | Main cast; 14 episodes |
| 2018 | FBI | Cole Cooper | Episode: "Crossfire" |
