= Pamela Gaye Walker =

American actress, writer, director, and producer

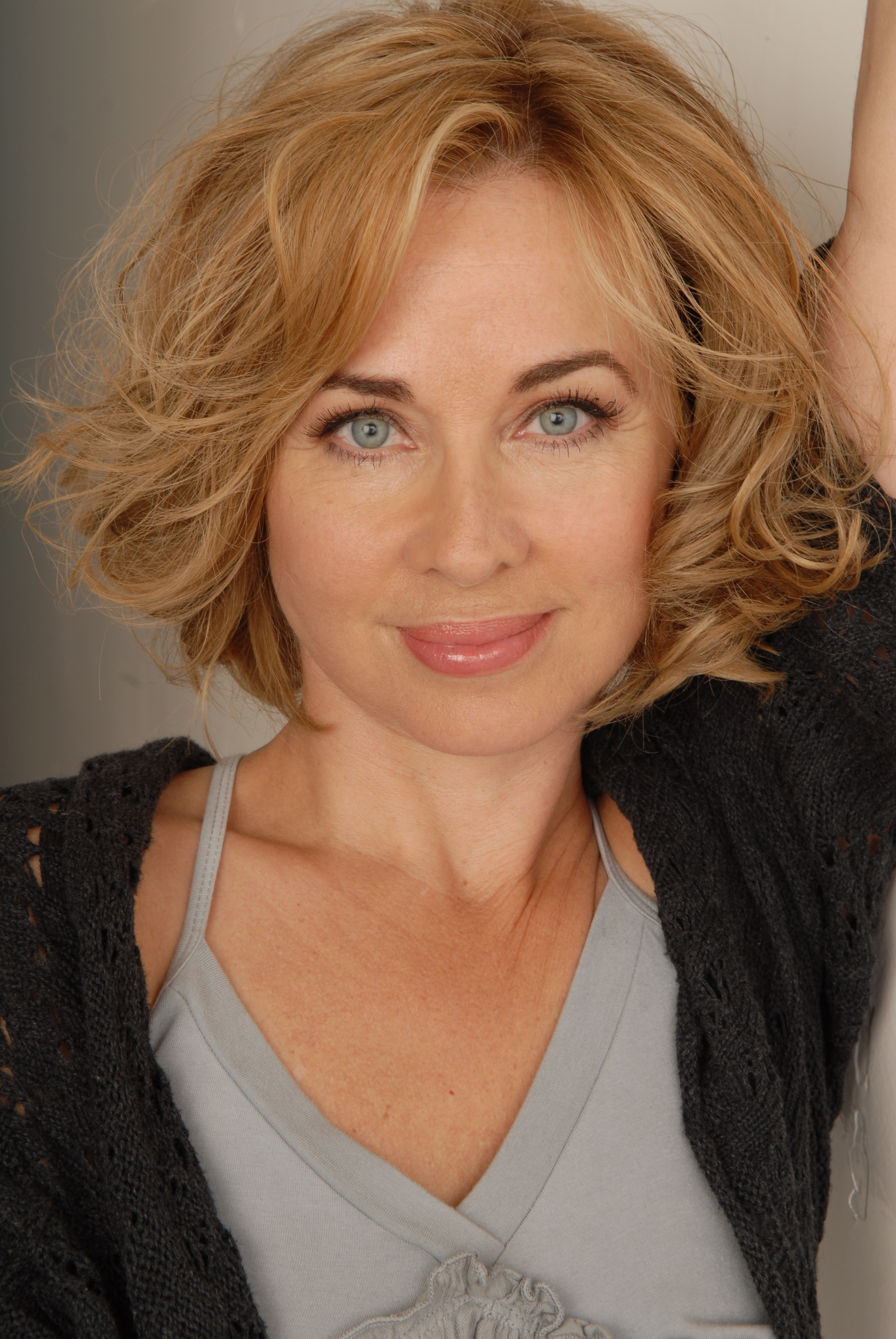
- Walker in 2015
- Born: Pamela Gaye; South Bend, Indiana
- Education: Saint Mary's College
- Occupations: Producer, actress
- Spouse: John Walker (m. 1981)

Pamela Gaye Walker is an American actress, writer, director, and producer for film and theatre. She is a member of Actors' Equity Association (AEA), and Screen Actors Guild/American Federation of Radio and Television Artists (SAG-AFTRA). She is the founder and president of Ghost Ranch Productions. She is known for Shakti's Retreat (2013) and Trifles (2009).

== Early and personal life ==
Walker grew up in South Bend, Indiana; she has a twin sister (Patricia) and three older brothers. Her father suffered a stroke when Pamela and her sister were three years old.

Walker married stage/film producer John Walker on December 5, 1981. John and Pamela starred together in over twenty shows at the Peninsula Players Theatre in Door County, Wisconsin. Her marriage proposal took place onstage there, after the opening night performance of Children of a Lesser God.

== Career ==
At Saint Mary's College, Walker majored in theatre, where she starred as Winnie in Samuel Beckett's two-character play Happy Days. It was while there that she met her future husband, fellow actor and eventual theatre and film producer John Walker. They performed together in Brecht's Caucasian Chalk Circle, You Can't Take it with You, Fiddler on the Roof, Molière's Imaginary Invalid, Barefoot in the Park, Treasure Island, among other plays.

After graduation, Walker trained in New York at Broadway's Circle in the Square Theatre Conservatory, where her teachers included Larry Moss (The Intent to Live), acting coach to Helen Hunt and Hilary Swank; Michael Kahn (The Acting Company); Jacqueline Brookes (Broadway actress); and Nikos Psacharopoulos (artistic director, Williamstown Theatre Festival).

In Chicago, Walker worked and taught acting at Victory Gardens Theater, where she played Georgie in Theresa Rebeck's Spike Heels. The Chicago Tribune's review said, "she's a sharp, funny, delightful comic actress, and she anchors the production in warmth, grace, spontaneity and beauty." She was also in Murder in Green Meadows by Doug Post, and Claudia Allen's Hannah Free, which garnered her the Actress of the Year Award from the Academy of Theatre Artists and Friends. Walker also received a nomination by the Joseph Jefferson Award committee for Outstanding Achievement by a Principal Actress in a Play for her work in Sea Marks at The Royal George Theater.

One of her most highly acclaimed roles was as Georgia O'Keeffe in the two-person play Alfred Stieglitz Loves O'Keeffe, based on the volatile love and artistic relationship between painter Georgia O'Keeffe and photographer Alfred Stieglitz.

Critical reviews of Walker's work include:

Backstage: "Walker beautifully conveys O’Keeffe’s inner turmoil, self-centeredness and eroticism...volatile, sensuous, playful, withholding and insecure..."
Pasadena Weekly: "Walker and Ortlieb bring the lovers to life. Alone, each performer is formidable. Together, the play leaps off the stage and into the stratosphere."

Walker worked as an actor with Theatreworks in Donald Margulies' Brooklyn Boy, at the Magic Theatre in Theresa Rebeck's world premiere of What We're Up Against, and in two plays for the Aurora Theatre – Ibsen's John Gabriel Borkman and Amy Herzog's After the Revolution. In May 2015, Walker starred with her husband, John, in the world premiere of Empty Nester by Garrett Jon Groenveld.

=== Theatre credits ===
Title	Role	Theatre	Director
Empty Nesters	Francis	Playground, Thick House, SF	Amy Glazer
After the Revolution	Mel	Aurora Theatre	Joy Carlin
What We're Up Against	Janice	Magic Theatre, SF	Loretta Greco
John Gabriel Borkman	Mrs. Wilton	Aurora Theatre	Barbara Oliver
Hauptmann	Mrs. Lindbergh	Cherry Lane Theatre, NY	Terry Mccabe
Buckets O' Beckett (w/ John Mohoney)	Wife	Mercury Theatre, Chicago	Matt O'Brien
The Last Schwartz	Bonnie	Zephyr Theatre, L.A.	Lee Sankowich
Brooklyn Boy	Nina	Theatreworks, Palo Alto, CA	Joy Carlin
Alfred Stieglitz Loves O'Keeffe	Georgia O'Keeffe	Fremont Theatre, L.A.	Mary-Pat Green
No. 11 (Blue and White)	Suzanne	Phoenix Theatre, S.F.	Paul Draper
Hannah Free	Rachel	Victory Gardens, Chicago	Sandy Shinner
Sea Marks	Timothea	The Royal George	Peter Forster
Spike Heels	Georgie	Victory Gardens, Chicago	Amy A. Field
The Good Times Are Killing Me	Sharon	Halsted Theatre, Chicago	Arnold Aprill
Alfred Stiglitz Loves O'Keeffe	Georgia O'Keeffe	Players Theatre, Columbus	Paul Draper
Sea Marks	Timothea	Peninsula Players	Sabin Epstein
Great To See You	Liza	Theatre Neo, L.A.	Mary-Pat Green
Murder In Green Meadows	Joan	Victory Gardens, Chicago	Curt Columbus
South Pacific	Janet/Nellie U.S.	Drury Lane Theatre, Chicago	Todd Booth
Clarence	Cora	Milwaukee Chamber	Montgomery Davis
Happy Days	Winnie	Notre Dame, Guest Artist	Julie Jenson
The Fancy Man	Amy	The Royal George	Peter Forster
Sex In the Title	Lola	Theatre NEO, L.A.	Mary-Pat Green
Children of a Lesser God	Sarah Norman	Peninsula Players	Bob Thompson
The Jewish Wife	Wife	The Cypress Group, Chicago	John Nicholson
Little Shop of Horrors	Audrey	Peninsula Players	Bob Thompson
The Sea	Mrs. Tilehouse	The Cypress Group, Chicago	John Nicholson
Biloxi Blues	Daisy	Peninsula Players	Nancy Simon
Hurry, The Train is Leaving	Barbara	Theatre Geo, L.A.	Mary-Pat Green
Juno and the Paycock	Mary	Peninsula Players	Bob Thompson
The Early Male Years	Cynthia	Northlight Rep, Chicago	Mary Monroe
The Importance of Being Earnest	Gwendolyn	Peninsula Players	Carl Benson
Repeat With Madeline	Madeleine	Voltaire, Chicago	Jim Mcdermott
A Life	Mibs	Peninsula Players	Montgomery Davis
Coming Back	Mother	The Cypress Group, Chicago	John Nicholson
The Middle Ages	El	Peninsula Players	Montgomery Davis

=== Television and film credits ===
Title	Role	Year
Remember Me	Dr. McInerney	2016
Shakti's Retreat	Penelope	2013
Play by Play	Mrs. Chisholm (short)	2011
Seducing Charlie Barker	Fiona	2010
Trifles (short)	Minnie Wright	2009
The Incredibles	Additional Voices (voice)	2004
The Package (short)	The Mom	2004
Wooly Boys	Starla	2001
Blueberry Pancakes (short)	Chris	2000
Saved by the Bell The New Class (TV series)	Matthew's Mom	1999
Last Rites (TV movie)	Sheila	1999
Mercury Rising	Susan (uncredited)	1998

=== Awards and nominations ===
Category	Award	Theater	Result
Actress of the Year	Academy of Theatre Artists & Friends	Chicago Theatre	Won
Outstanding Achievement by a Principal Actress in a Play	Joseph Jefferson Award	Chicago Theatre	Nominated
Best Actress, 2001	Reviewplays.com	Alfred Stieglitz Loves O'Keeffe	Los Angeles Theatre
Best Play	Alfred Stieglitz Loves O'Keeffe	Valley Theatre League	Nominated
Artistic Director Achievement Awards	Alfred Stieglitz Loves O'Keeffe	Valley Theatre League	Won
