= Burrower =

Burrower may refer to:

- Burrowing animals, any animals that excavate burrows
- Sandburrowers, a family of fishes
- The Burrowers, a 2008 film

== See also ==
- Burrower bugs, a family of insects
- Snout-burrowers, or shovelnose frogs
