= Seducing Charlie Barker =

- Directed by: Amy Glazer
- Written by: Theresa Rebeck
- Produced by: Lynn Webb
- Starring: Daphne Zuniga; Stephen Barker Turner; Heather Gordon; David Wilson Barnes
- Cinematography: Jim Orr
- Edited by: Aidria Astravas; Jordan Ceccarelli; Rick LeCompte
- Music by: Bruce Fowler
- Production company: Kanbar Entertainment
- Release dates: 1 March 2010 (Method Fest Independent Film Festival); 2 December 2011 (limited)
- Running time: 93 minutes
- Country: United States
- Language: English

Seducing Charlie Barker is a 2010 American comedy film directed by Amy Glazer, starring Daphne Zuniga, Stephen Barker Turner, Heather Gordon and David Wilson Barnes. It is an adaptation of writer Theresa Rebeck's play The Scene.

== Cast ==
- Daphne Zuniga as Stella
- Stephen Barker Turner as Charlie
- Heather Gordon as Clea
- David Wilson Barnes as Lewis
- Steve Cell as Nick
- Pamela Gaye Walker as Fiona
- Liam Vincent as Lou

== Reception ==
Dennis Harvey of Variety wrote that Rebeck "excels" at character writing and dynamics while the performances "grasp their meaty opportunities with disciplined relish."

Frank Scheck of The Hollywood Reporter wrote that while the "storyline is hardly original", it "does provide the opportunity for Rebeck to unleash wickedly scathing observations about the sort of self-obsessed show business types who pursue their own interests no matter who it hurts". He also praised the performances, writing that Zuniga "provides just the right grace notes as the aggrieved wife", Turner "convincingly embodies Charlie’s sweaty desperation", and Gordon "displays such sexual abandon that there won’t be a male in the audience who won’t identify with her hapless victim."

Jeannette Catsoulis of The New York Times wrote that while Gordon "runs her mouth and works her curves like a champ — and ingeniously redirects our sympathies during a climactic bedroom confrontation", her performance is "almost too brittle", and "words bounce off her without making a dent", leaving the film "with little to do but hover anxiously over a marriage we don’t care about and a talent we are never persuaded exists."
