= Undiscovered (film) =

2005 film by Meiert Avis

- Theatrical release poster
- Directed by: Meiert Avis
- Written by: John Galt
- Produced by: Michael Burns; Bic Tran; Marco Mehlitz; Michael Ohoven
- Starring: Pell James; Steven Strait; Kip Pardue; Shannyn Sossamon; Carrie Fisher; Peter Weller; Fisher Stevens; Ashlee Simpson
- Cinematography: Danny Hiele
- Edited by: David Codron
- Music by: David Baerwald
- Production companies: Cinejota; Lakeshore Entertainment
- Distributed by: Lions Gate Films
- Release date: August 26, 2005
- Running time: 97 minutes
- Country: United States
- Language: English
- Budget: $9 million
- Box office: $1.1 million

Undiscovered is a 2005 American drama film directed by Meiert Avis. The plot is about a group of aspiring entertainers who intend to establish their careers in Los Angeles.

The film was originally called Wannabe, but was retitled prior to release. Undiscovered was the first significant film role for Ashlee Simpson, who had previously acted on the television series 7th Heaven before launching a singing career. "Undiscovered" is also the name of one of Simpson's songs, the closing track from her debut album Autobiography, the song is included in the film.

Released on August 26, 2005, the film also had the record for largest percentage drop-off in ticket sales from its opening weekend to its second weekend in theatrical release, 86.4%, until it was broken by Collide in March 2017.

The DVD and VHS of the film was released on December 26, 2005.

== Plot ==
Aspiring New York model Brier falls in love at first sight with a struggling musician, Luke, when they cross paths on a subway train. Having achieved success as a model, she decides to move to L.A. to launch an acting career. She wanted to become a dancer but it did not work out. With the support of her agent and sometimes surrogate mom, Carrie, she lands a spot in an acting class where she befriends another would-be actress, Clea. While out on the town, Brier crosses paths with Luke once again in a club called 'The Mint'. The two girls realize that he is actually a good musician, and they then decide to help him and set out to create some L.A. style hype to get him noticed by a record company. As his profile rises, so do the demands of his budding new career, and they both discover that the price of fame may be higher than anyone expected.

== Main cast ==
- Pell James as Brier Tucket
- Steven Strait as Luke Falcon
- Shannyn Sossamon as Josie
- Ashlee Simpson as Clea
- Perrey Reeves as Michelle
- Peter Weller as Wick Treadway
- Kip Pardue as Euan Falcon
- Carrie Fisher as Carrie
- Stephen Moyer as Mick Benson
- Fisher Stevens as Garrett Schweck
- Ewan Chung as Brendan, Garrett's Assistant

== Reception ==
On the review aggregator website Rotten Tomatoes, 6% of 72 critics' reviews are positive, with an average rating of 3.3/10. The website's consensus reads: "Undiscovered, a film about aspiring actresses and musicians, lacks originality and a convincing plot." Metacritic, which uses a weighted average, assigned the film a score of 29 out of 100, based on 22 critics, indicating "generally unfavorable" reviews. Audiences polled by CinemaScore gave the film an average grade of "C−" on an A+ to F scale.

== See also ==
- Second weekend in box office performance § Second-weekend drop, for other films with similar second weekend drops
