= Stephen Barker Turner =

American actor (born 1968)

- Born: June 27, 1968 (age 58); St. Louis, Missouri, U.S.
- Education: Juilliard School (BFA)

Stephen Barker Turner (born June 27, 1968) is an American stage, television, and film actor.

== Early life ==
Turner was born in St. Louis, Missouri on June 27, 1968. He earned a Bachelor of Fine Arts degree from the Juilliard School.

== Career ==
After starring in numerous stage productions, Turner made his film debut in Book of Shadows: Blair Witch 2. He had a small but important nonspeaking role in Cosmopolitan (2003). He has also appeared in the television shows Swift Justice, Sex and the City, Law & Order, and Law & Order: Special Victims Unit.

He played title role of Charlie in Seducing Charlie Barker, an independent film adaptation of Theresa Rebeck's stage play The Scene, released in December 2011.

He is an associate artist at the California Shakespeare Theater, where he appeared as the titular character in their 2005 production of The Life and Adventures of Nicholas Nickleby.

== Filmography ==
=== Film ===
Year	Title	Role	Notes
2000	Book of Shadows: Blair Witch 2	Stephen	
2005	Satellite	Matt Muttel	
2007	The Warrior Class	Whitman Poole	
2008	We Pedal Uphill	Oliver	
2010	Seducing Charlie Barker	Charlie	

=== Television ===
Year	Title	Role	Notes
1996	Swift Justice	Bud Wertheim	Episode: "Bad Medicine"
1999	Sex and the City	Jeremy Fields	Episode: "The Chicken Dance"
1999	Law & Order	Nick Vance	Episode: "Merger"
2000	Law & Order: Special Victims Unit	Steven Hale	Episode: "Bad Blood"
2003	Cosmopolitan	Hans	Television film
2004	Hack	Mitchell Patton	Episode: "Misty Blue"
2004	Independent Lens	Hans	Episode: "Cosmopolitan"
2005	Law & Order: Criminal Intent	Adam Riggins	Episode: "Beast"
2011	Blue Bloods	Richard Hansen	Episode: "Little Fish"
2011	Body of Proof	Tom Parker	Episode: "Missing"
2015	Forever	Julian Glausser	Episode: "Hitler on the Half-Shell"
2016	Unforgettable	Kenneth Allen	Episode: "We Can Be Heroes"
2016	Madam Secretary	Ben Adams	Episode: "Tectonic Shift"
