= San Francisco Playhouse =

Non-profit theater company in California, U.S.

- SF Playhouse; The Playhouse
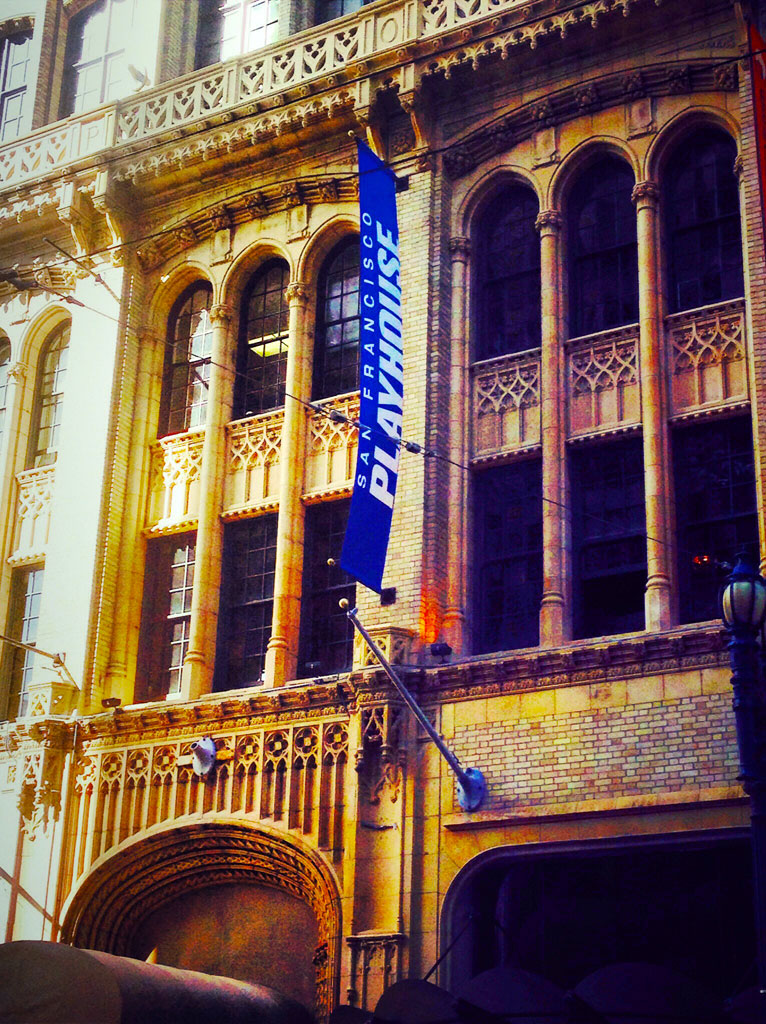
- Interactive map of San Francisco Playhouse
- Address: 450 Post Street; San Francisco, California, U.S.
- Coordinates: 37.7882°N 122.4089°W
- Capacity: 199

Construction
- Opened: 2003

Website
- www.sfplayhouse.org/sfph/

San Francisco Playhouse (formerly SF Playhouse) is a non-profit theater company in San Francisco, California, founded in 2003 by Bill English and Susi Damilano. The theater stages nine plays yearly, including Broadway plays, musicals, and world and regional premieres.

San Francisco Playhouse has been home to several world premieres, including Bauer by Lauren Gunderson, Ideation by Aaron Loeb, Grounded by George Brant, and Seared by Theresa Rebeck.

As part of its mission to shape and promote the growth of performing arts in the Bay Area, San Francisco Playhouse created the Rising Star Program, which provides theatre tickets to under-served youths in San Francisco and surrounding communities.

In 2015, the theater company was awarded the American Theatre Wing's National Theatre Company Grant.

During the COVID-19 pandemic, San Francisco Playhouse became one of the first theatre companies in the United States to get permission from Actors' Equity Association to film live actors on stage. The company's on-demand stream of Art by Yasmina Reza premiered on October 24, 2020, to positive reviews.

== History ==
=== Change of venue ===
In 2012, San Francisco Playhouse moved from 533 Sutter Street to a 199-seat theater at 450 Post Street, inside of the Kensington Park Hotel. The building was constructed in 1924 by architect Anthony Heinsberger as a lodge for the Elks. The Elks began leasing out portions of the building in 1981. Their former meeting hall was converted into a 750-seat theater by architect Gene Angell in 1982 for producers Jonathan Reisis and Joseph Perrotti. They presented more than 60 productions in the space as Theatre on the Square. When Theatre on the Square closed down in 2002, the theater served as the home of other groups, including The Post Street Theatre and The Lorraine Hansberry Theatre, before becoming the site of San Francisco Playhouse. During its tenure with The Lorraine Hansberry Theatre, renovations were made including reducing the audience capacity to 400. The San Francisco Playhouse further reduced the seating to 199 prior to their inaugural production in the space in October 2012.

== Programs ==
=== Rising Star Program ===
The Rising Star Theatre Attendance Program inspires a new generation of theatregoers by providing Bay Area high school students with a four play season subscription. As part of the TAP, students receive a pre-show lesson plan that includes theatre games/warm-ups, scene teasers and comprehension questions; the post-show lesson provides further enrichment with activities that draw on their experience as audience members. Rising Stars also participate in an immediate post-show discussion with the cast and director. They then write a letter to their adult subscriber-sponsor describing their reactions to the performances.

The Rising Star Program now serves 600 youth from 19 local high schools. According to the company, Approximately 50% have no formal drama program at their schools, 75% are economically disadvantaged, and 90% are minorities. In a survey conducted by the company, 25% of students reported that they hadn't seen a single play prior to attending a San Francisco Playhouse production, and another 50% had only seen one to two shows before participating in the Rising Star Program.

=== Sandbox Series ===
The presentations have limited design elements and are being promoted primarily online thus reducing the costs and risk of each production. By reducing risk, the Sandbox Series is designed to bridge the gap between “readings” and “main stage” productions and thus provide increased exposure to the new voices in American Theater.

== Productions ==
Opening	Play	Writer	Director
2026/07	Hairspray	Marc Shaiman (music and lyrics) Scott Wittman (lyrics), Mark O'Donnell & Thomas Meehan (book)	Bill English & Phaedra Tillery-Boughton
2026/05	Dracula	Kate Hamill	Bill English
2026/03	Flex	Candrice Jones	Margo Hall
2026/02	M. Butterfly	David Henry Hwang	Bridgette Loriaux
2025/11	Into the Woods	Stephen Sondheim (music and lyrics), James Lapine (book)	Susi Damilano
2025/07	My Fair Lady	Frederick Loewe (music), Alan Jay Lerner (book and lyrics)	Bill English
2025/05	The Curious Incident of the Dog in the Night-Time	Simon Stephens (play), Mark Haddon (novel)	Susi Damilano
2025/03	Fat Ham	James Ijames	Margo Hall
2025/01	Exotic Deadly: Or The MSG Play	Keiko Green	Jesca Prudencio
2024/11	Waitress	Sara Bareilles (music and lyrics), Jessie Nelson, Adrienne Shelly (film)	Susi Damilano
2024/09	The Play That Goes Wrong	Henry Lewis (playwright), Jonathan Sayer, Henry Shields	Susi Damilano
2024/06	Evita	Andrew Lloyd Webber (music), Tim Rice (lyrics)	Bill English
2024/06	Evita	Andrew Lloyd Webber (music), Tim Rice (lyrics)	Bill English
2024/05	The Glass Menagerie	Tennessee Williams	Jeffrey Lo
2024/03	The 39 Steps	Patrick Barlow (adaptation), John Buchan (novel), Alfred Hitchcock (film)	Susi Damilano
2024/01	My Home on the Moon	Minna Lee	Mei Ann Teo
2023/11	Guys and Dolls	Frank Loesser (music), Abe Burrows, Jo Swerling (book), Damon Runyan (characters)	Bill English
2023/09	Nollywood Dreams	Jocelyn Bioh	Margo Hall
2023/06	A Chorus Line	Marvin Hamlisch (music), Edward Kleban (lyrics), James Kirkwood Jr., Nicholas Dante (book)	Bill English
2023/05	Chinglish	David Henry Hwang	Jeffrey Lo
2023/03	Clue	Sandy Rustin	Susi Damilano
2023/01	Cashed Out	Claude Jackson, Jr.	Tara Moses
2022/11	As You Like It (musical adaptation)	William Shakespeare (book) | Shaina Taub (music and lyrics)	Susi Damilano
2022/09	Indecent	Paula Vogel	Susi Damilano
2022/06	Follies	James Goldman (book) Stephen Sondheim (music and lyrics)	Bill English
2022/05	The Paper Dreams of Harry Chin	Jessica Huang	Jeffrey Lo
2022/03	Water by the Spoonful	Quiara Alegría Hudes	Denise Blasor
2022/01	Heroes of the Fourth Turning	Will Arbery	Bill English
2021/11	Twelfth Night	William Shakespeare (book) Shaina Taub (music and lyrics)	Susi Damilano
2021/10	The Great Khan	Michael Gene Sullivan	Darryl V. Jones
2021/08	Starting Here, Starting Now	David Shire (music) Richard Maltby, Jr. (lyrics)	Susi Damilano
2021/07	The Song of Summer	Lauren Yee	Bill English
2021/06	Hold These Truths	Jeanne Sakata	Jeffrey Lo
2021/05	Shoot Me When... (streaming video production)	Ruben Grijalva	Susi Damilano
2021/04	I Was Right Here (streaming video production)	Julia Brothers	Padraic Lillis
2021/03	[hieroglyph] (streaming video production)	Erika Dickerson-Despenza	Margo Hall
2020/12	Songs for a New World (streaming video production)	Jason Robert Brown	Bill English
2020/11	The Jewelry Box (streaming video production)	Brian Copeland	David Ford
2020/10	Art (streaming video production)	Yasmina Reza	Bill English
2020/06	Follies (Production canceled due to COVID-19 pandemic)	Stephen Sondheim (music and lyrics) James Goldman (book)	Bill English
2020/05	The Clean House (Production canceled due to COVID-19 pandemic)	Sarah Ruhl	Susi Damilano
2020/03	Real Women Have Curves (Production canceled due to COVID-19 pandemic)	Josefina López	TBD
2020/01	Tiny Beautiful Things	Cheryl Strayed (book), Nia Vardalos (stage adaptation)	Bill English
2019/11	Groundhog Day (musical)	Tim Minchin (music and lyrics) Danny Rubin (book)	Susi Damilano
2019/09	Dance Nation	Clare Barron	Becca Wolff
2019/06	Cabaret	John Kander (music) Fred Ebb (lyrics) Joe Masteroff (book)	Susi Damilano
2019/04	Significant Other	Joshua Harmon	Lauren English
2019/03	Yoga Play	Dipika Guha	Bill English
2019/01	King of the Yees	Lauren Yee	Joshua Kahan Brody
2018/11	Mary Poppins	Julian Fellowes (book) Sherman Brothers (music and lyrics)	Susi Damilano
2018/09	You Mean to Do Me Harm	Christopher Chen	Bill English
2018/07	Sunday in the Park with George	James Lapine (book) Stephen Sondheim (Music and Lyrics)	Bill English
2018/05	An Entomologist's Love Story	Melissa Ross	Giovanna Sardelli
2018/03	The Effect	Lucy Prebble	Bill English
2018/01	Born Yesterday	Garson Kanin	Susi Damilano
2017/11	A Christmas Story: The Musical	Joseph Robinette (book) Benj Pasek and Justin Paul (Music & Lyrics)	Susi Damilano
2017/09	Barbecue	Robert O'Hara	Margo Hall
2017/07	La Cage aux Folles	Harvey Fierstein (book) Jerry Herman (Music and Lyrics)	Bill English
2017/05	The Roommate	Jen Silverman	Becca Wolff
2017/03	Noises Off	Michael Frayn	Susi Damilano
2016/07	The Christians	Lucas Hnath	Bill English
2016/11	She Loves Me	Joe Masteroff (book) Sheldon Harnick (Lyrics) Jerry Bock (Music)	Susi Damilano
2016/09	Seared	Theresa Rebeck	Margarett Perry
2016/07	City of Angels	Larry Gelbart (book) Cy Coleman (Music) David Zippel (Lyrics)	Bill English
2016/05	Red Velvet	Lolita Chakrabarti	Margo Hall
2016/03	Colossal	Andrew Hinderaker	Jon Tracy
2016/01	The Nether	Jennifer Haley	Bill English
2015/11	Stage Kiss	Sarah Ruhl	Susi Damilano
2015/09	Dogfight	Benj Pasek and Justin Paul	Bill English
2015/07	Company	George Furth	Susi Damilano
2015/05	Trouble Cometh	Richard Dresser	May Adrales
2015/03	Stupid Fucking Bird	Aaron Posner	Susi Damilano
2015/01	Tree	Julie Hébert	Jon Tracy
2014/11	Promises, Promises	Neil Simon	Bill English
2014/09	Ideation	Aaron Loeb	Josh Costello
2014/06	Into the Woods	James Lapine (book) Stephen Sondheim (music and lyrics)	Susi Damilano
2014/05	Seminar	Theresa Rebeck	Amy Glazer
2014/03	Bauer	Lauren Gunderson	Bill English
2014/01	Jerusalem	Jez Butterworth	Bill English
2013/11	Storefront Church	John Patrick Shanley	Joy Carlin
2013/10	The Bengal Tiger at the Baghdad Zoo	Rajiv Joseph	Bill English
2013/07	Camelot	Alan Jay Lerner (book & lyrics) & Frederick Loewe (music)	Bill English
2013/05	Abigail's Party	Mike Leigh	Amy Glazer
2013/03	Reasons to Be Pretty	Neil LaBute	Susi Damilano
2013/01	The Motherfucker with the Hat	Stephen Adly Guirgis	Bill English
2012/12	Bell, Book and Candle	John Van Druten	Bill English
2012/10	Bloody, Bloody Andrew Jackson	Alex Timbers (script) & Michael Friedman (music & lyrics	Jon Tracy
2012/07	My Fair Lady	George Bernard Shaw (book), Alan Lerner (lyrics) & Frederick Loewe (music)	Bill English
2012/05	A Behanding in Spokane	Martin McDonagh	Susi Damilano
2012/03	The Aliens	Annie Baker	Lila Neugebauer
2012/01	Becky Shaw	Gina Gionfriddo	Amy Glazer
2011/11	Period of Adjustment	Tennessee Williams	Bill English
2011/09	Honey Brown Eyes	Stefanie Zadravec	Susi Damilano
2011/06	Tigers Be Still	Kim Rosenstock	Amy Glaxer
2011/05	Reborning	Zayd Dohrn	Josh Costello
2011/03	Wirehead	Benjamin Brown	Susi Damilano
2011/01	Harper Regan	Simon Stephens	Amy Glazer
2010/11	Coraline	David Greenspan (book) & Stephin Merritt (music & lyrics)	Bill English
2010/09	The Sunset Limited	Cormac McCarthy	Bill English
2010/06	The Fantasticks	Tom Jones (book & lyrics) & Harvey Schmidt (music)	Bill English
2010/04	Slasher	Allison Moore	Jon Tracy
2010/03	Den of Thieves	Stephen Adly Guirgis	Susi Damilano
2010/01	Animal out of Paper	Rajiv Joseph	Amy Glazer
2009/11	She Stoops to Comedy	David Greenspan	Mark Rucker
2009/09	First Day of School	Billy Aronson	Chris Smith
2009/06	One Flew Over the Cuckoo's Nest	Dale Wasserman	Bill English
2009/05	Dead Man's Cell Phone	Sarah Ruhl	Susi Damilano
2009/03	The Story	Tracey Scott Wilson	Margo Hall
2009/01	Landscape of the Body	John Guare	Bill English
2008/12	Abraham Lincoln's Big Gay Dance Party	Aaron Loeb	Chris Smith
2008/10	Shining City	Conor McPherson	Amy Glazer
2008/07	Tea & Crisp	Richard Louis James	Richard Louis James
2008/06	Cabaret	Joe Masteroff (book)& Fred Ebb (lyrics)& John Kender (music)	Bill English
2008/05	Bug	Tracy Letts	Jon Tracy
2008/03	Coronado	Dennis Lehane	Susi Damilano
2008/01	The Scene	Theresa Rebeck	Amy Glazer
2007/12	Mrs Bob Cratchit's Wild Christmas Binge	Christopher Durang	Joy Carlin
2007/09	Six Degrees of Separation	Jon Guare	Bill English
2007/06	Man of La Mancha	Dale Wasserman (book), Joe Darion (lyrics) & Mitch Leigh (music)	Jon Tracy
2007/05	First Person Shooter	Aaron Loeb	Jon Tracy
2007/03	Jesus Hopped the 'A' Train	Stephen Adly Guirgis	Bill English
2007/01	Three Seconds in the Key	Deb Margolin	Leigh Fondakowski
2006/11	Reckless	Craig Lucas	Louis Parnell
2006/09	The Ride Down Mount Morgan	Arthur Miller	Joy Carlin
2006/06	Putting it Together	Stephen Sondheim	–
2006/05	Roulette	Paul Weitz	Susi Damilano
2006/03	Our Lady of 121st Street	Stephen Adly Guirgis	–
2006/01	The Mystery Plays	Roberto Aguirre-Sacasa	–
2005/11	Prelude to a Kiss	Craig Lucas	–
2005/09	The Crucible	Arthur Miller	–
2005/06	Art	Yasmina Reza	Robin Stanton
2005/04	Kimberly Akimbo	David Lindsay-Abaire	–
2005/02	Monster	Neal Bell	Bill English
2004/11	Our Town	Thornton Wilder	Bill English
2004/09	The Fantasticks	Tom Jones (Book & Lyrics) Harvey Schmidt (music)	Bill English
2004/04	The Smell of the Kill	Michelle Lowe	Bill English
2004/02	The Glory of Living	Rebecca Gilman	Bill English
2003/12	It Had to be You	Renee Taylor & Joseph Bologna	–

=== Sandbox Series ===
Opening	Play	Writer	Director
2020/08	Primary User (Production canceled due to COVID-19 pandemic)	Nate Eppler	Lauren English
2020/02	Born in East Berlin	Rogelio Martinez	Margarett Perry
2019/10	The Daughters	Patricia Cotter	Jessica Holt
2018	Washed Up on the Potomac	Lynn Rosen	José Zayas
2018	In Braunau	Dipika Guha	Susannah Martin
2018	Non-Player Character	Walt McGough	Lauren English
2016	Zenith	Kirsten Greenidge	Lauren English
2016	You Mean to Do Me Harm	Christopher Chen	Bill English
2016	All of What You Love and None of What You Hate	Phillip Howze	Edris Cooper-Anifowoshe
2016	The Rules	Dipika Guha	Susannah Martin
2016/03	On Clover Road	Steven Dietz	Susi Damilano
2015/08	1 2 3	Lila Rose Kaplan	Lauren English
2014/10	77%	Rinne Groff	Marissa Wolf
2014/08	From Red to Black	Rhett Rossi	Susi Damilano
2013/09	Ideation	Aaron Loeb	Josh Costello
2013/02	Inevitable	Jordan Puckett	Lauren English
2012/08	Grounded	George Brant	Susannah Martin
2012/06	Reunion	Kenn Rabin	Louis Parnell
2012/02	Private Parts	Graham Gremore	Bill English
2011/10	Track in a Box	Tim Barsky	Jon Tracy
2010/10	Seven Days	Daniel Heath	Susi Damilano
2010/02	Safe House	Geetha Reddy	Nancy Carlin
2010/05	The Apotheosis of Pig Husbandry	William Bivins	Bill English
