= Janet Noble =

American dramatist

Janet Noble (born March 4, 1940) is an American playwright, screenwriter and journalist. She is the daughter of George and Stella Noble, and is the mother of artist, Noon Gourfain. She lives in NYC.

== Early life ==
She was born and raised in Grovers Mill, New Jersey, fabled site of the Martian landing in Orson Welles's radio broadcast of The War of The Worlds. After graduation from Georgian Court University with a B.A. from The Sisters of Mercy, she moved to NYC and a job with Scholastic Magazines. Within a year, she signed for a season of repertory in Milwaukee, WI and began what was to be a long and adventurous life in the theater.

== Career ==
As an actress, Janet Noble worked with repertory companies around the US and at off-off-Broadway venues in NYC. (One of her favorite roles was as The Moon in The Grand Tarot with Charles Ludlam's Ridiculous Theatrical Company.) From 1981-1985, she studied playwriting at the Ensemble Studio Theater with Curt Dempster. Two of her one-acts, Mr. Nice Guy (1983) and Disappearing Blues (1984) were included in EST’s Octoberfests of New Plays.

For ten years she was involved with The Irish Arts Center as an actress, director and playwright. Her plays Kiss the Blarney Stone and Away Alone were written for and staged by the IAC. Away Alone has been produced in many major cities in the U.S. and Canada, as well as at The Peacock in Dublin's Abbey Theatre. She wrote the script for the film version, retitled Gold in the Streets, which was produced by Noel Pearson. Other full-length plays include: The Theater of War, On High Ground, Artistic License, When Men Could Sing and Louise Brooks: For the Hell of It.

Noble was named one of the Top 100 Irish Americans of 1990 by The Irish Voice/Irish America Magazine and, in 2001 she received a New York State Council for the Arts grant with which she wrote a radio play, Squirrel Soup. She's a member of The Dramatists' Guild and the Irish American Writers & Artists. Her play, Away Alone is published by Samuel French and Heinmann Books (New American Plays 2). She sometimes leads a playwriting workshop at the Delaware Valley Arts Alliance in Narrowsburg, NY.

As a journalist, Noble has written for The Daily News, The Irish Voice, Irish America Magazine and The River Reporter in Narrowsburg, NY. She is also a graphic artist and worked for various publications in NYC.

== Works ==
FULL LENGTH PLAYS:

- Kiss the Blarney Stone
- Away Alone
- The Theater of War
- Artistic License,
- Louise Brooks: For the Hell of It

RADIO PLAY:

- Squirrel Soup (ongoing since 2001)

ONE ACT PLAYS:

- Mr. Nice Guy
- Disappearing Blues
- Hello, Mr. Chops

SCREENPLAYS:

- Run for Cover (commissioned by Talisman Films and American Playhouse/PBS)
- Gold in the Streets
