= John Walker (film producer) =

American producer and actor (born 1956)

- Born: April 21, 1956 (age 70); Elgin, Illinois, U.S.
- Education: University of Notre Dame
- Occupations: Film producer; actor
- Spouse: Pamela Gaye Walker (m. 1981)

John Walker (born April 21, 1956) is an American film producer and actor. He produced Disney-Pixar's The Incredibles (2004) and its sequel Incredibles 2 (2018).

Walker graduated at the University of Notre Dame, and studied theatre education at American Conservatory Theater in San Francisco. He served as managing director of Victory Gardens Theater, where he produced over 30 new plays.

Walker is also the vice president of Ghost Ranch Productions, a non-profit corporation committed to producing a wide variety of exceptional plays, musicals, and films.

He is married to Pamela Gaye Walker, president of Ghost Ranch Productions. As of 2015, they have acted together in 25 shows.

== Filmography ==
Year	Title	Role	Notes
1989-2006	Great Performances	Writer, producer	Television Series
1991	Antony & Cleopatra	Producer	Television Movie
1999	The Iron Giant	Associate Producer	
2001	Osmosis Jones	Associate Producer	
2004	The Incredibles	Producer	Voice of Reverend (uncredited)
2005	Jack-Jack Attack	Special Thanks	Short Film
2005	Mr. Incredible and Pals	Special Thanks	Short Film
2007	Ratatouille	Production Resources	
2008	WALL-E	Production Resources	
2008	Cars Toons: Mater's Tall Tales	Special Thanks	Short Films; Episodes 1-3
2009	Calendar Confloption	Special Thanks	Short Film
2010	Day & Night	Special Thanks	Short Film
2012	Brave	Special Thanks	
2012	Buzkashi Boys	Special Thanks	Short Film
2015	Tomorrowland	Executive Producer	
2015	The Good Dinosaur	Additional Production Leadership	
2016	Piper	Special Thanks	Short Film
2016	Finding Dory	Special Thanks	
2017	Cars 3	Special Thanks	
2017	Coco	Additional Thanks	
2018	Incredibles 2	Producer	
