= Pell James =

American actress

Pell James is an American actress.

== Life and career ==
In 2005, James portrayed Brier in Undiscovered. She also appeared in the film Broken Flowers and earned her first starring role in the film The King. In 2007, she played Zodiac Killer victim Cecelia Shepard in Zodiac.

In 2006, James married banker, entertainment executive, and vice-chairman of Lionsgate Michael R. Burns in a Roman Catholic ceremony officiated by Rev. William G. Murphy at the Chateau Marmont.

== Filmography ==
=== Film ===
Year	Title	Role	Notes
1999	Black & White	Pell	
2003	Uptown Girls	Julie	
2005	Satellite	Annie	
2005	The King	Malerie	
2005	Broken Flowers	Sun Green	
2005	Undiscovered	Brier Tucket	
2005	Neighborhood Watch	Wendi	
2005	Confess	Isabel	
2007	Zodiac	Cecilia Shepard	
2008	Surveillance	Bobbi Prescott	
2009	Against the Current	Amy Thompson	
2009	Shrink	Daisy	
2009	Fanboys	Crystal	
2011	The Lincoln Lawyer	Lorna Taylor	
2013	Dark Circles	Penny	
2013	Pawn Shop Chronicles	Cyndi	
2017	Only the Brave	Claire Caldwell	
2018	Peppermint	Peg	

=== Television ===
Year	Title	Role	Notes
2002	Law & Order	Chloe	Episode "Access Nation"
2004	Law & Order: Special Victims Unit	Alicia Morley	Episode: "Brotherhood"
2004	Strip Search	Willa Shields	TV film
2006	Deceit	Claudia	TV film
2016	Casual	Karen Dennis	Episode: "Trivial Pursuit"
2017	SEAL Team	Jane Cole	Episode: "Borderlines"
2019–2021	Euphoria	Amy Vaughn	2 episodes
