= The Blackwater Lightship (film) =

- Based on: The Blackwater Lightship by Colm Tóibín
- Screenplay by: Shane Connaughton
- Directed by: John Erman
- Starring: Dianne Wiest; Gina McKee; Keith McErlean; Sean Campion; Brían F. O'Byrne; Angela Lansbury
- Music by: John Morris
- Country of origin: United States
- Original language: English

Production
- Producers: John Erman; Heather Ogilvie; Brent Shields; Richard Welsh
- Cinematography: Tony Imi
- Editor: Bill Henry
- Running time: 98 minutes
- Production company: Hallmark Hall of Fame

Original release
- Network: CBS
- Release: February 4, 2004

The Blackwater Lightship is a 2004 Hallmark Hall of Fame made-for-television drama film adaptation of the novel The Blackwater Lightship by the Irish author Colm Tóibín. It aired on CBS on February 4, 2004. The film stars Angela Lansbury, Gina McKee, Sean Campion, Dianne Wiest, and Keith McErlean. Lansbury received an Emmy nomination for it in 2004.

== Cast ==
- Dianne Wiest as Lily Devereux Breen
- Gina McKee as Helen Breen O'Doherty
- Keith McErlean as Declan Breen
- Angela Lansbury as Dora Devereux
- Marijka Bardin as Young Helen Breen
- Sean Campion as Michael Breen
- Barry Cassin as Fr. Griffin
- Angela Harding as Mrs. Byrne
- Laura Hughes as Anne
- Ruth McCabe as Dr. Louise
- Frank McCusker as Harry
- Maria McDermottroe as Madge Kehoe
- Dearbhla Molloy as Essie Kehoe
- Brían F. O'Byrne as Larry
- Kevin O'Dwyer as Young Declan Breen
- David Parnell as Dr. Kerwin
- Sam Robards as Paul
- Macdara Ó Fátharta (billed as Macdara O'Fatharta) as Grandad

== Notes ==
- This was the first and only Hallmark Hall of Fame movie to be aired on a Wednesday instead of a Sunday, due to CBS airing the Super Bowl XXXVIII on Sunday, February 1.
- This is also the second Hallmark Hall of Fame movie in which Angela Lansbury stars, the first being The Shell Seekers.
