= Karl Geary =

Irish actor and author (born 1972)

- Born: 31 May 1972 (age 54); Dublin, Ireland
- Occupations: Actor; author
- Years active: 1994–present
- Spouse: Laura Fraser (m. 2003)
- Children: 2

Karl John Geary (born 31 May 1972) is an Irish-born American actor and author.

== Early life ==
Geary was born in Dublin. In 1987, at the age of 15, he moved to the United States; he later obtained a green card in a visa lottery for undocumented Irish immigrants, and ultimately became a naturalized citizen.

== Career ==
Geary appeared in Madonna's Sex book. His acting roles include Sex and the City, Hysteria – The Def Leppard Story, and Hamlet (2000). He wrote and appeared in Coney Island Baby (2003). He appeared as Coffey in the 2008 horror film The Burrowers. He owns a bar in downtown Manhattan called the Scratcher, and previously co-owned another club, the original tiny Cafe Sin-é on St. Mark's Place in the East Village, where he waited on tables alongside Jeff Buckley.

== Personal life ==
Geary has seven siblings. In 2003, he married Scottish actress Laura Fraser. They have one daughter, Lila, and live in Glasgow, Scotland. Geary also has a son, Billy, from a previous relationship.

== Filmography ==
=== Film ===
Year	Title	Role	Notes
1994	Nadja	Renfield	
1997	Gold in the Streets	Liam	
1998	Montana	Bosch	
1998	Trance	Sean	
1999	The Book of Stars	Kristjan	
2000	Hamlet	Horatio	
2002	Happy Here and Now	Eddie / Tom	
2003	Coney Island Baby	Billy Hayes	Also writer
2003	Mimic 3: Sentinel	Marvin	
2004	Timbuktu	Deecy	
2005	Satellite	Kevin Sinks	
2008	Stag Night	Joe	
2008	The Burrowers	Fergus Coffey	
2012	Archaeology of a Woman	Officer John	
2014	Jimmy's Hall	Seán	
2015	Experimenter	Stephen Macht	
2016	I Am Not a Serial Killer	Grant Neblin	

=== Television ===
Year	Title	Role	Notes
1997	Painted Lady	Aiden Finnegan	Miniseries; 2 episodes
1998	Sex and the City	Tommy	Episode: "Bay of Married Pigs"
1999	Esther	Dalphon	Television film
2001	Hysteria – The Def Leppard Story	Steve Clark	Television film
2006	Hide & Seek	Greg Holden	4 episodes
2010	Gravity	Diego	6 episodes

== Publications ==
- Montpelier Parade 2017 ISBN 1-9112-1545-0
- Juno loves Legs 2023 ISBN 9781787303102
