= Painted Lady (TV series) =

1997 British mystery drama TV series

- Genre: Drama; Murder mystery
- Written by: Alan Cubitt
- Directed by: Julian Jarrold
- Starring: Helen Mirren; Karl Geary; Iain Glen; Franco Nero; Michael Maloney; Lesley Manville; Iain Cuthbertson; Barry Barnes; Michael Liebmann; John Kavanagh
- Composer: Peter Salem
- Country of origin: United Kingdom
- Original language: English
- No. of series: 1
- No. of episodes: 2

Production
- Executive producers: Gub Neal; Rebecca Eaton
- Producer: Emma Burge
- Production locations: Dublin, Ireland
- Running time: 101 minutes (including adverts)
- Production company: WGBH Boston in association with Granada Television

Original release
- Network: ITV
- Release: 7 December – 8 December 1997

Painted Lady is a 1997 murder mystery drama starring Helen Mirren, involving art theft. It co-starred Franco Nero, Karl Geary and Iain Glen, and was directed by Julian Jarrold.

The role was created specifically for Mirren, as a means for her to try something a bit different from her Inspector Tennison character on the popular Prime Suspect series. The series was a collaborative effort of Granada Television and PBS. It was broadcast on ITV from 7 to 8 December 1997 in the UK and in the US on PBS's Masterpiece Theatre 26 April 1998.

== Plot summary ==
Maggie Sheridan, a washed-up blues vocalist from the 1960s who had long since stopped performing, had settled into a comfortable life on the Dublin estate of Sir Charles Stafford, the father of her childhood friend. When Sir Charles is murdered in what appears to be a bungled robbery (in which a valuable sixteenth-century painting is stolen), Maggie is drawn into the world of illegal art trade to solve the mystery and avenge her friend's murder, donning the persona of Polish Countess Magdelena Kreschinskaá.

The story centres around Judith Beheading Holofernes, the masterwork of Artemisia Gentileschi, who was a 17th-century female Italian painter who survived a rape. The painting fictionally travels to Dublin and New York City, and Gentileschi's tragic story eventually figures into the plot. There are other visual references to notable paintings in the film.

== Cast ==
- Helen Mirren as Maggie Sheridan
- Iain Glen as Sebastian Stafford
- Franco Nero as Robert Tassi
- Michael Maloney as Oliver Peel
- Lesley Manville as Susie Peel
- Iain Cuthbertson as Charles Stafford
- Barry Barnes as D. S. Fagan
- Michael Liebmann as Bryan Gavin
- John Kavanagh as Michael Longley

== Gallery ==
Paintings featured:

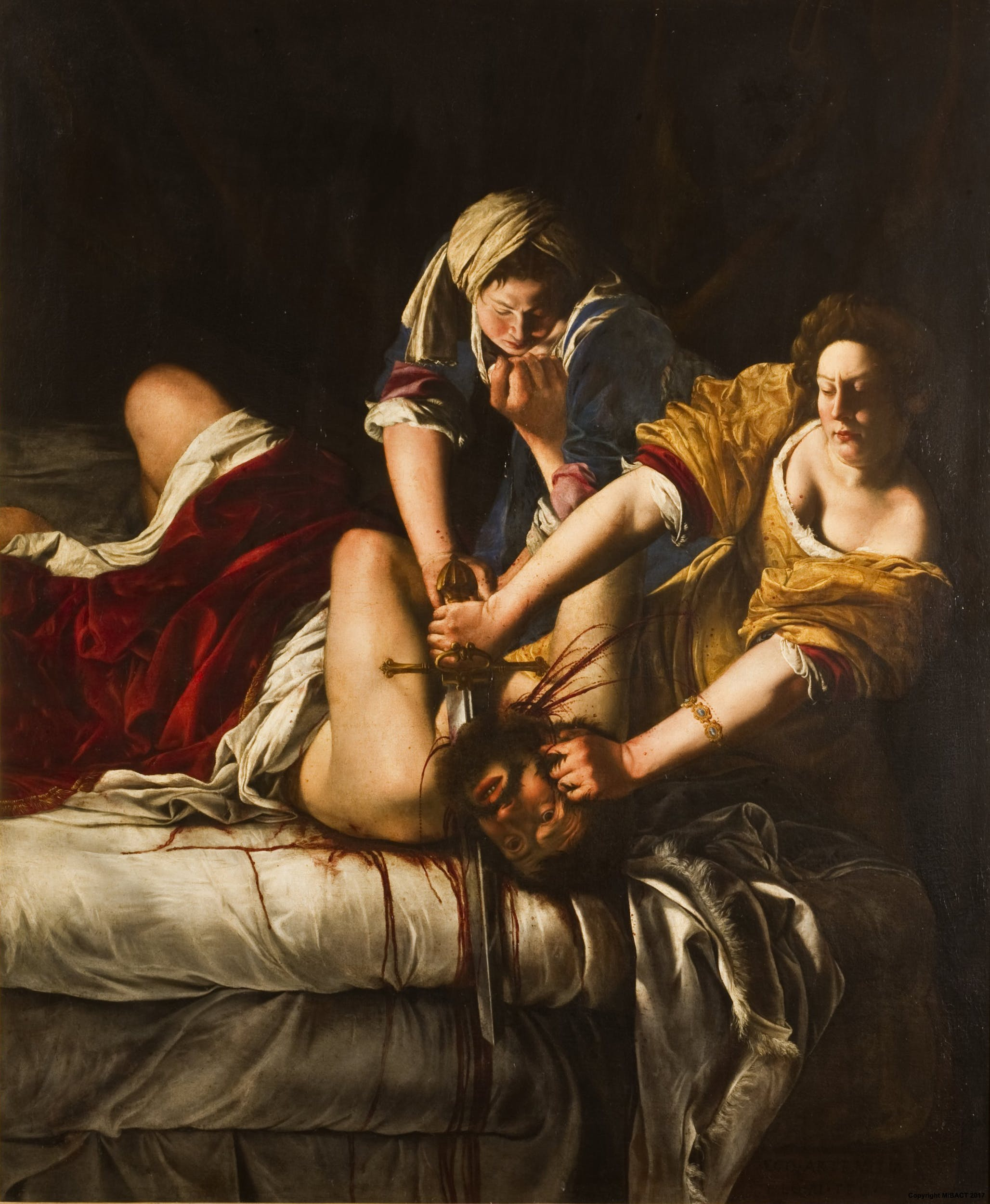
Judith Beheading Holofernes by Artemisia Gentileschi

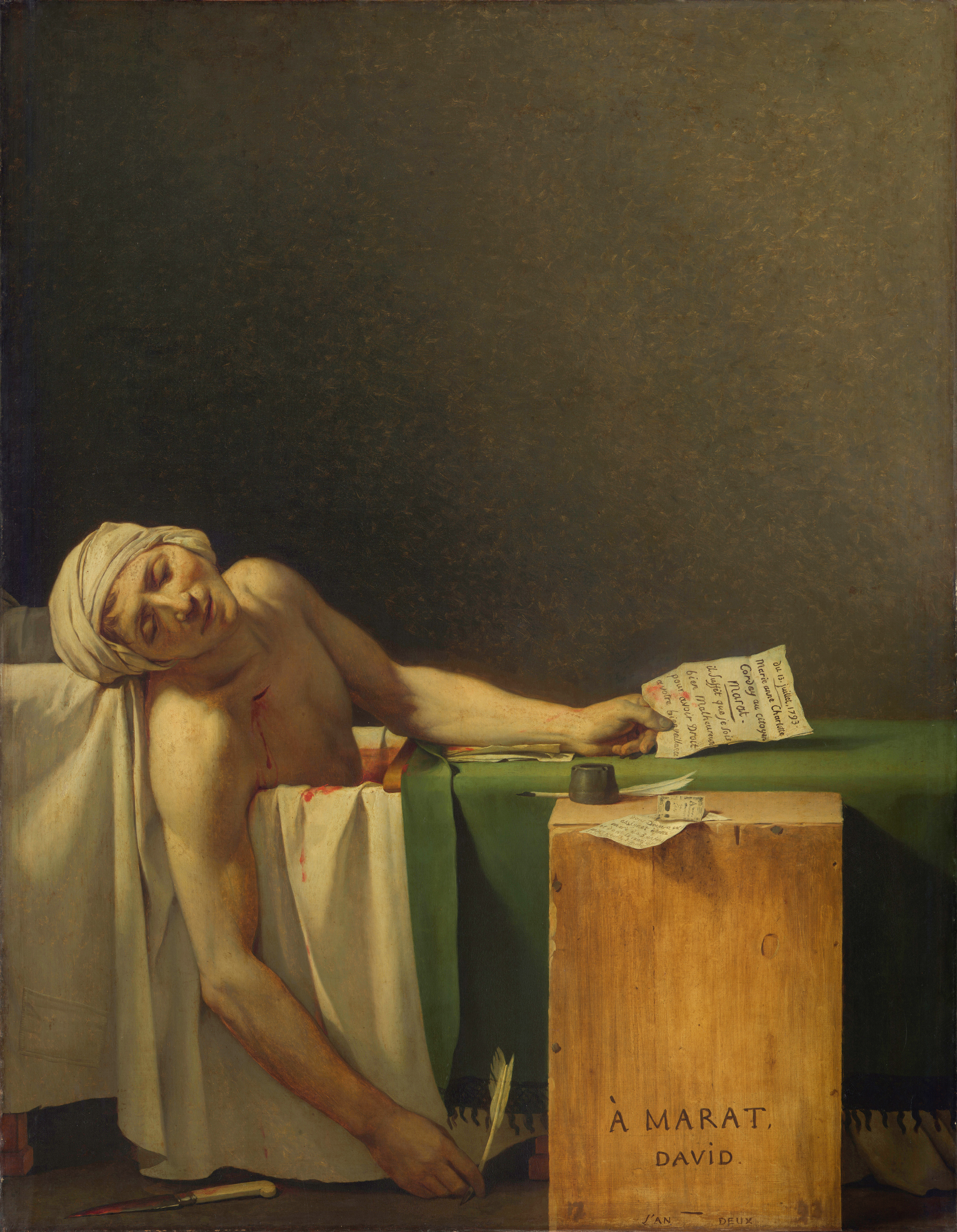
The Death of Marat by Jacques-Louis David, imitated in bathtub scene

Martyrdom of St. Sebastian by Giovanni Bassi (and many others), alluded in death scene
