= Timbuktu (2004 film) =

2004 Irish film

- Theatrical film poster
- Directed by: Alan Gilsenan
- Written by: Paul Freaney
- Produced by: Martin Mahon; John McDonnell; Emma Scott
- Starring: Eva Birthistle; Karl Geary; George Jackos; Liam Ó Maonlaí; Sean Campion
- Cinematography: P.J. Dillon
- Edited by: Emer Reynolds
- Music by: Ray Harman
- Release date: February 12, 2004 (Dublin)
- Running time: 94 mins.
- Country: Ireland
- Language: English

Timbuktu is a 2004 Irish road movie drama film, directed by Alan Gilsenan and written by Paul Freaney. It stars Eva Birthistle, Karl Geary, Liam Ó Maonlaí, Sean Campion, and George Jackos. It premiered at the Dublin International Film Festival in 2004.

== Synopsis ==
Irish-made road-movie set in the African Sahara, telling the story of Isobel and her transvestite friend Deecy as they travel in the region, trying to find Isobel's brother who has been abducted.

== Cast ==
- Eva Birthistle as Isobel
- Karl Geary as Deecy
- George Jackos as Brahim
- Liam Ó Maonlaí as Conor
- Sean Campion as Cathal
- Tony Brown as Dungeon Master
- Salah Dizane as Colonel
- Adil Abdelwahab as Guide

== Reception ==
Ronnie Scheib of Variety lamented about the film's shortcomings by saying, "Alternately gaining and losing focus, pic often slips its narrative moorings only to regroup and plunge back into more-or-less linear storytelling. Exhausting if haunting pilgrimage never quite transcends the aridness of its premise, indicating meager prospects commercially."
