= The King (2005 film) =

- Directed by: James Marsh
- Written by: Milo Addica; James Marsh
- Produced by: Milo Addica
- Starring: Gael García Bernal; Paul Dano; William Hurt; Pell James; Laura Harring
- Cinematography: Eigil Bryld
- Distributed by: THINKFilm (USA); ContentFilm International (UK)
- Release dates: 15 May 2005 (Cannes); 5 May 2006 (United States); 19 May 2006 (United Kingdom)
- Running time: 105 minutes
- Countries: United Kingdom; United States
- Language: English

The King is a 2005 Southern Gothic drama film about a troubled man, recently discharged from the Navy, who goes to Corpus Christi, Texas, in search of the father he has never met. The film stars Gael García Bernal, who received strong critical acclaim for his portrayal of the main character Elvis, as well as William Hurt, Pell James, Paul Dano and Laura Harring. It was written by its British director James Marsh and also by Milo Addica, the Academy Award–nominated writer of Monster's Ball and Birth.

== Synopsis ==
A man enlisted in the U.S. Navy, Elvis Valderez (Gael García Bernal), is discharged and purchases a used car to travel to his “home” in Corpus Christi, Texas. Elvis arrives at the church of Pastor David Sandow (William Hurt). He watches his sermon from the back of the church and then follows him and his family, including his wife Twyla (Laura Harring), son Paul (Paul Dano) and daughter Malerie (Pell James), to their home. Pastor Sandow confronts Elvis, who shows him a snapshot of his mother Yolanda, with whom he had relations many years ago before becoming a Christian. Pastor Sandow becomes agitated and tells Elvis that he has a family now and is a popular member of the community. He tells Elvis to call him so they can talk, though later tells his family that the young man simply wanted to become a member of the church and to not associate with him.

Elvis moves into a local motel and gets a job as a pizza delivery man. Having met Pastor Sandow's teenage daughter Malerie earlier at the church, he soon begins to pick her up from school where they go on drives and take walks at a local park. They start a passionate affair and have sexual relations on a regular basis. Meanwhile, Pastor Sandow's son Paul leads a high school movement where he attempts to change the school's science curriculum from evolution to intelligent design, though his plans are rejected by the school board. Disappointed by this setback, Paul, who leads a Christian rock band at his father's church, performs an intimate song before the congregation about his frustrations, the song being a cover of Sparklehorse's "Sad and Beautiful World". Pastor Sandow severely chastises his son for such indulgence. One evening, Elvis sneaks into the Sandow's home to spend the night with Malerie. After they have sex, he leaves the house in the middle of night and is spotted by Paul, who follows Elvis back to his motel and interrogates him about his affair with his sister. Paul threatens to tell his father and Elvis abruptly stabs Paul in the stomach, killing him.

Elvis dumps Paul's body in a nearby pond and returns Paul's car to the Sandow's house. The next day the police are called to investigate Paul's disappearance and the family becomes distraught. Pastor Sandow believes Paul has run away because of the argument they had about his musical performance. Meanwhile, Elvis continues his affair with Malerie and she soon becomes pregnant. Elvis takes Malerie to the pond where he dumped Paul's body and reveals to her what happened. Deeply in love with Elvis, Malerie holds his hands and they pray together to God and ask for forgiveness.

After seeing Elvis one day at a traffic light, Pastor Sandow follows him to his motel. Together, they drive to a local archery range where he teaches Elvis to shoot with Paul's hunting bow. He invites Elvis to dinner where he sits at the family table in Paul's chair. In private, Elvis explains to Malerie that his arrival at dinner is because of his acceptance into her father's church. Elvis soon moves into the Sandow's home, taking Paul's bedroom. During a Sunday sermon, Pastor Sandow's wife Twyla walks out of the church, still distraught over Paul's disappearance and doubting the existence of God. She walks into a busy street of traffic and attempts suicide, but Elvis saves her from injury. Elvis begins to plant flowers in the family garden, and Twyla compliments him on his work, slowly accepting him into the family. Malerie and Elvis continue to have sexual relations, with Elvis sneaking into her room each night.

One Sunday, Pastor Sandow finally decides to make a confession to his congregation. He reveals that Elvis is his illegitimate son, the product of an affair he had many years ago with his mother Yolanda, a prostitute. Malerie, sitting next to Elvis, is stunned by the revelation and stares at him though he will not meet her gaze. Pastor Sandow asks Elvis to join him on stage and he is accepted into the congregation with enthusiastic applause. Later, Elvis and Malerie are having lunch together. Malerie is repulsed and distraught knowing their relationship is incestuous, but Elvis simply places a paper crown upon his head when she says to him, "We’re going to hell." Elvis attempts to enter Malerie's room that night but the door is locked. The next day, Malerie embraces her mother in tears in the backyard of the Sandow's home. Elvis, watching from an upstairs window, is greeted by the hateful gaze of Twyla, suggesting that she now knows their secret. Pastor Sandow arrives at his church alone prepared to go about the day's business.

A long camera shot through the Sandow's picturesque home eventually reveals Elvis placing the bodies of Malerie and Twyla on Pastor Sandow's bed. Malerie is still breathing, and Elvis smothers her with a pillow. Elvis then sets fire to the Sandow home. Elvis drives in Paul's car to Pastor Sandow's church. With blood on his shirt and hands, he walks into Pastor Sandow's office and says to him, "I need to get right with God".

== Cast ==
Actor	Role
Gael García Bernal	Elvis Valderez
William Hurt	Pastor David Sandow
Pell James	Malerie Sandow
Paul Dano	Paul Sandow
Laura Harring	Twyla Sandow

== Reception ==
On the review aggregator website Rotten Tomatoes, 57% of 79 critics' reviews are positive, with an average rating of 6.0/10. The website's consensus reads: "This disturbing film about the past coming back demanding its due evokes classical tragedy, but is ultimately too heavy-handed." Metacritic, which uses a weighted average, assigned the film a score of 58 out of 100, based on 29 critics, indicating "mixed or average" reviews.

Some film critics were impressed with the film's sensitive handling of subject matter. Roger Ebert gave it 3.5/4 calling it, “the kind of work where characters develop on their own, without consulting the book of clichés”. Empire, a UK film magazine, called it, “A compelling, intelligent and provocative sins-of-the-father story with a terrific ensemble cast, and a standout Mr. Ripley turn by the ever-versatile Gael García Bernal.”

It was screened in the Un Certain Regard section at the 2005 Cannes Film Festival.
