= Stones in His Pockets =

1996 play by Marie Jones

- Original language: English
- Written by: Marie Jones
- Genre: Comedy
- Setting: County Kerry in rural Ireland

Premiere
- Date: 1996
- Place: Amharclann na Carraige; DubbleJoint Theatre Company; Belfast

Stones in His Pockets is a two-hander written in 1996 by Marie Jones for the DubbleJoint Theatre Company in Dublin, Ireland.

The play is a tragicomedy about a small rural town in Ireland where many of the townspeople are extras in a Hollywood film. The story centres on Charlie Conlon and Jake Quinn, who, like much of the town, are employed as extras for the filming. The key point in the play is when a local teenager commits suicide, by drowning himself with stones in his pockets, after he is humiliated by one of the film stars. The script calls upon the cast of two to perform all 15 characters (men and women), often switching gender and voice swiftly and with minimal costume change – a hat here, a jacket there. Comedy also derives from the efforts of the production crew to create the proper "Irish feel" – a romanticised ideal that often conflicts with the reality of daily life.

The play was first shown in Belfast in 1996 and went on to The Edinburgh Festival fringe and to have a successful run in London's West End. The original cast of Conleth Hill and Sean Campion later took the show to Broadway. Having won the Irish Times/ESB Irish Theatre Award for Best Production in 1999, the play also won two Olivier Awards in 2001 for Best New Comedy and Best Actor (Conleth Hill).

== Plot summary ==
The drama is set in a rural town in County Kerry, Ireland, that is overrun by a Hollywood film crew. The play centres around two friends, Charlie Conlon and Jake Quinn, employed as extras on the film. Charlie has aspirations to get his script made into a movie. Jake has recently returned from New York and is mesmerised, along with everyone else, by the star of the movie, Caroline. Caroline is a famous, beautiful American movie star that fails to ever successfully conquer the Irish accent. Caroline and the other American crew members do not attempt to accurately portray the town and people and only care about finishing the movie on time. Most of the locals are initially excited at the opportunity to be a part of a major film and distracted by the novelty. However, as the film continues they begin to feel abused and the glamour begins to wear off. After a night in the pub, a local teenager, Sean Harkin, is humiliated by Caroline and thrown out into the street for trying to socialise with her. The first act ends when Sean commits suicide by drowning himself with stones in his pockets. The second act continues the story with the town devastated by the loss. Jake begins to blame himself for not reaching out to the boy and Charlie tries to console him and let him not lose hope. Conflict arises when the film crew is hesitant about letting the extras have a break for Sean's funeral. It becomes even more apparent to the town that the film crew has their own agenda and no concern for the people. Jake and Charlie decide to rewrite Charlie's script and make it about Sean's story instead. They present their idea to the American director who in turn tells them the story is not romantic or commercial enough.

== Productions ==
The play began life as a Dubbeljoint Production premiering in West Belfast Festival in August 1996 - the original cast was Conleth Hill and Tim Murphy. The set design, by Jack Kirwan, is simple - a backcloth depicting the cloudy sky above the Blasket Islands, a row of shoes (symbolising the myriad characters) and a trunk, a box, and two tiny stools. The lighting design was originally by James C. McFetridge and this design was used in both the London West End and the Broadway versions of the shows.

The play began life at the Lyric Theatre in Belfast with the initial run touring to the small community hall in Ballybeen estate, East Belfast, and the Culturlan on the Falls Road in West Belfast (where it played to roughly five people). The script was modified heavily during the rehearsal period by Marie Jones, Ian McElhinney and the cast with re-writes occurring regularly. The show moved to the Edinburgh Fringe Festival in 1999. The show then returned to Ireland and had a brief run in Dublin before moving to London's Tricycle Theatre, it then transferred to the New Ambassadors Theatre in London's West End. The show, however, proved so successful, its run was extended and moved to the Duke of York's Theatre up the road, where it remained for three years.

The original cast of Conleth Hill and Sean Campion took the show to Broadway and, as its West End run continued to play to packed houses, actors were lining up to play Charlie and Jake, most notably Bronson Pinchot, Rupert Degas, Christopher Patrick Nolan and Simon Delaney.

It won the Irish Times/ESB Irish Theatre Award for Best Production in 1999, won two Olivier Awards in 2001 for Best New Comedy and Best Actor (Conleth Hill) and was also nominated for three Tony Awards in 2001.

Gothenburg English Studio Theatre made a production of Stones in His Pockets in 2009. It was directed by Malachi Bogdanov with Mike Rogers and Gary Whitaker.

The play was translated to Finnish and it has been on repertoire since 2002 at Helsinki City Theatre, Finland.

It was revived at London's Tricycle Theatre in 2011, with Jamie Beamish as Charlie and Owen McDonnell as Jake, and at the Tron, Glasgow in 2012 performed by Robbie Jack and Keith Fleming.

For the 20th anniversary of the first production, The Dukes in Lancaster and The Theatre Chipping Norton co-produced a touring production which opened at The Dukes on 25 February 2016 and toured 35 venues between then and 28 May 2016. Charlie de Bromhead played Jake and Conan Sweeny played Charlie.

== Authorship controversy ==
The original version of the play was created in collaboration with theatre director Pam Brighton (1946-2015), who later sued Marie Jones for co-authorship rights. Brighton lost the case in the high court, and subsequently was declared bankrupt.

== Awards and nominations ==
=== Original London and Broadway production ===
Year	Award	Category	Nominee	Result
2001	WhatsOnStage Award	Best New Comedy		Won
2001	WhatsOnStage Award	Best Actor	Conleth Hill	Won
2001	Laurence Olivier Award	Best Entertainment or Comedy Play		Won
2001	Laurence Olivier Award	Best Actor	Conleth Hill	Won
2001	Laurence Olivier Award	Best Actor	Sean Campion	Nominated
2001	Tony Award	Best Actor in a Play	Conleth Hill	Nominated
2001	Tony Award	Best Actor in a Play	Sean Campion	Nominated
2001	Tony Award	Best Direction of a Play	Ian McElhinney	Nominated

== See also ==
- Irish theatre
