= How to Seduce Difficult Women =

2009 film by Richard Temtchine

- Directed by: Richard Temtchine
- Written by: Richard Temtchine
- Produced by: Richard Temtchine
- Starring: Louis-Do de Lencquesaing; Stéphanie Szostak
- Cinematography: Benjamin Chartier
- Edited by: Michael D. Thomson
- Music by: Pedro H. da Silva
- Production company: Quadrant Entertainment
- Distributed by: Quadrant Entertainment
- Release date: October 30, 2009
- Running time: 94 minutes
- Country: United States
- Language: English

How to Seduce Difficult Women is a 2009 American romantic comedy film written, directed, and produced by Richard Temtchine. The film stars Louis-Do de Lencquesaing and Stéphanie Szostak. It revolves around a writer who decides to take on ten relationship-challenged men to help them learn the art of seduction.

== Cast ==
- Louis-Do de Lencquesaing as Philippe
- Stéphanie Szostak as Gigi
- Gregg Bello as Dan
- Brian Avers as Mitchell
- Rachel Roberts as Sabrina
- Jonathan Hova as Mo
- David Wilson Barnes as Doug
- Esau Pritchett as David
- David Lee Russek as Tom
- Paul Lazar as Sam
- Adam LeFevre as Ira
- Jeff Skowron as Ronnie
- Bill Dawes as Al
- Jackie Hoffman as Book Publisher

== Reception ==
On Rotten Tomatoes, How to Seduce Difficult Women holds an approval rating of 14% based on 7 reviews, with an average rating of 3.40 out of 10. Joseph Jon Lanthier of Slant Magazine rated the film 1 out of 4 stars, noting it "embodies the disturbingly "modern" sexual idealism that promises kinky rewards and cuddly concessions respectively to men and women bold enough to assert their selfishness in pursuit of "instinctual" posturing (men control, women swoon)." Aaron Hillis, writing for Time Out, gave the film 1 out of 5 stars.
