= David Wilson Barnes =

American actor (1972–2025)

- Born: David Wilson Barnes; October 30, 1972; San Diego, California, U.S.
- Died: July 30, 2025 (aged 52); New York City, U.S.
- Occupation: Actor
- Years active: 1998–2025
- Spouse: Monica Bill Barnes

David Wilson Barnes (October 30, 1972 – July 30, 2025) was an American actor. He appeared in Capote (2005), The Company Men (2010), The Bourne Legacy (2012) and Bridge of Spies (2015).

== Life and career ==
Barnes was born in San Diego, California on October 30, 1972. His other roles include the TV series Law & Order, 30 Rock, Sex and the City, A Gifted Man, The Good Wife and Blue Bloods. He died from cancer on July 30, 2025, at the age of 52.

== Filmography ==
=== Film ===
Year	Title	Role	Notes
2005	Capote	Grayson	
2009	Taking Woodstock	News Reporter	
2009	How to Seduce Difficult Women	Doug	
2010	The Company Men	Thayer	
2010	Remember Me	Business Associate	
2010	Seducing Charlie Barker	Lewis	
2012	The Bourne Legacy	Drone Spec	
2015	True Story	Corey Douglas	
2015	Lily & Kat	Ben	
2015	Bridge of Spies	Mr. Michener	
2016	Miss Sloane	Daniel Posner	
2018	Trial by Fire	Reaves	
2021	A Journal for Jordan	Schaefer	

=== Television ===
Year	Title	Role	Notes
2003	Sex and the City	Andrew	Episode: "The Post-It Always Sticks Twice"
2003, 2007, 2010	Law & Order	Evan Hicks / Mr. Quinlann / Attorney Gilman	3 episodes
2004, 2007	Law & Order: Criminal Intent	Abe McVee / Shep	2 episodes
2006	Conviction	Thomas / Thomas Searl	2 episodes
2006	Law & Order: Special Victims Unit	Agent Hellerman	Episode: "Choreographed"
2009	The Eastmans	Dr. James Eastman	TV movie
2010	The Good Wife	Dillon Loomis	Episode: "Painkiller"
2010	You Don't Know Jack	David Gorcyca	TV movie
2011	30 Rock	Thomas	Episode: "Double-Edged Sword"
2012	A Gifted Man	Paul Mathis	Episode: "In Case of Complications"
2012	Louie	Charlie	Episode: "Late Show: Part 1"
2013	Elementary	Cooper	Episode: "The Deductionist"
2013	The Big C	Wesley	Episode: "The Finale"
2013–2014, 2017, 2021	Blue Bloods	Doc / Police Psychiatrist / Dr. Alex Dawson	4 episodes
2014	The Knick	Addiction Doctor	Episode: "Crutchfield"
2014–2016	Hell on Wheels	Martin Delaney	16 episodes
2014, 2017	Halt and Catch Fire	Dale Butler	3 episodes
2017	The Blacklist: Redemption	Phil Marienthal	Episode: "Whitehall: Conclusion"
2017–2019	The Son	Phineas McCullough	20 episodes
2019	The Blacklist	Dr. Spalding Stark	2 episodes
2020	Perry Mason	Elder Brown	7 episodes
2021	The Underground Railroad	Jamison	2 episodes
2021	Bull	David Sherman	Episode: "A Friend in Need"
2022–2024	FBI	CIA Officer Peter Bradford	Episode: "Double Blind"
2022–2023	George & Tammy	Billy Sherrill	6 episodes
2023	Full Circle	Agent Roan Jessup	3 episodes
2023	The Gilded Age	Norman Tate	2 episodes
2025	The Savant	TBA	Miniseries, posthumous release

=== Video games ===
Year	Title	Role
2010	Red Dead Redemption	Archer Fordham
