= Gold in the Streets =

- Directed by: Elizabeth Gill
- Written by: Janet Noble; Noel Pearson
- Based on: Away Alone by Janet Noble
- Produced by: Noel Pearson
- Starring: Jim Belushi; Ian Hart; Jared Harris
- Cinematography: Jack Conroy
- Edited by: Tracy Granger
- Music by: Kíla
- Release date: 1997
- Running time: 94 minutes
- Countries: United Kingdom; Ireland
- Language: English

Gold in the Streets is a 1997 drama film written by Janet Noble and Noel Pearson, directed by Elizabeth Gill and starring Jim Belushi, Ian Hart and Jared Harris. It is based on Noble’s play Away Alone.

== Cast ==
- Karl Geary as Liam
- Jim Belushi as Mario
- Ian Hart as Des
- Jared Harris as Owen
- Aidan Gillen as Paddy
- Louise Lombard as Mary
- Tom Hickey as Mr. Costello
- Andrea Irvine as Breda
- Lorraine Pilkington as Rose
- Candra Doherty as Deirdre

== Reception ==
Michael Dwyer of The Irish Times gave the film a negative review and wrote, “ The characters are mostly predictable stereotypes whose fates are all too well signalled all too far in advance.”
