= Seared (play) =

Play by Theresa Rebeck

- Original language: English
- Written by: Theresa Rebeck
- Characters: Harry; Mike; Emily; Rodney

Premiere
- Date: September 27, 2016
- Place: San Francisco Playhouse, California

Seared is a dramatic stage play by American playwright Theresa Rebeck set in a restaurant kitchen. Its world premiere was held at the San Francisco Playhouse in 2016, before premiering Off-Broadway in 2019 at MCC Theater.

== Plot ==
The play is set in the kitchen of a struggling restaurant, as the protagonist Harry meets a clash of wills in this drama of ideology versus money with his brother. Harry is chef who takes great pride in his cooking, working at a restaurant that is finally starting to see some success. When his business partner Mike brings in an outside consultant to help with the business, Harry finds the change more than he can handle.

== Production history ==
=== 2016 San Francisco premiere ===
The play had its world premiere at the San Francisco Playhouse in 2019, directed by Margarett Perry. Running from September 27 through November 12, 2016, the production starred Brian Dykstra as Harry, Rod Gnapp as Mike, Alex Sunderhaus as Emily and Larry Powell as Rodney.

=== 2019 Off-Broadway production ===
The play was next produced Off-Broadway in 2021 at MCC Theater, starring Raúl Esparza as Harry, David Mason as Mike, Krysta Rodriguez as Emily and W. Tré Davis as Rodney and ran from October 3 through December 22, 2019 after being extended.

In 2020, the Off-Broadway production was honored in four Outer Critics Circle Awards categories, including for Outstanding New Off-Broadway Play, along with nominations for two Lucille Lortel Awards, two Drama League Awards and a Drama Desk Award for Esparza.

== Cast and characters ==
Character	San Francisco 2016	Off-Broadway 2019
Harry	Brian Dykstra	Raúl Esparza
Mike	Rod Gnapp	David Mason
Emily	Alex Sunderhaus	Krysta Rodriguez
Rodney	Larry Powell	W. Tré Davis

== Critical reception ==
Seared got positive reviews as the San Francisco Chronicle called it 'culinary drama done to perfection', praising the director and cast performance.

Mercury News had reviewed the play as being 'packed with clever dialogue...and a genuine love of food'. Their critic said that the play was much simpler in plot than Rebeck's other work, with no secrets or plot twists and no attempt to show the characters' lives outside work, despite clever dialog about the nature of authenticity and tension about whether the chef Harry will agree to changes.

Theatre Dogs gave it a glowing review, saying that "Seared turns out to be not unlike the dishes its chef creates: artfully made, crafted with the best possible ingredients and served with confident flair. That it’s so delicious and deeply satisfying makes it the haute cuisine of contemporary drama."

== Awards and nominations ==
=== 2019 Off-Broadway production ===
Year	Award	Category	Work	Result	Ref.
2020	Drama Desk Award	Outstanding Actor in a Play	Raúl Esparza	Nominated	
2020	Outer Critics Circle Award	Outstanding New Off-Broadway Play		Honored	
2020	Outer Critics Circle Award	Outstanding Actor in a Play	Raúl Esparza	Honored	
2020	Outer Critics Circle Award	Outstanding Featured Actress in a Play	Krysta Rodriguez	Honored	
2020	Outer Critics Circle Award	Outstanding Scenic Design	Tim Mackabee	Honored	
2020	Drama League Award	Outstanding Production of a Play		Nominated	
2020	Drama League Award	Distinguished Performance	Raúl Esparza	Nominated	
2020	Lucille Lortel Award	Outstanding Lead Actor in a Play	Raúl Esparza	Nominated	
2020	Lucille Lortel Award	Outstanding Scenic Design	Tim Mackabee	Nominated	
