= Satellite (film) =

- Directed by: Jeff Winner
- Written by: Jeff Winner
- Produced by: Brian Devine; Jason Orans; Jen Small
- Starring: Karl Geary; Stéphanie Szostak; Larry Fessenden; Christina Kirk; Pell James; Randall Jaynes
- Cinematography: Albino Marsetti
- Edited by: Jeff Winner
- Music by: Peter Gannon
- Production company: Gigantic Pictures
- Release dates: 23 April 2005 (Tribeca Film Festival); 9 August 2006 (US)
- Running time: 100 minutes
- Country: United States
- Language: English

Satellite is a 2005 American romantic drama film directed by Jeff Winner, starring Karl Geary, Stéphanie Szostak, Larry Fessenden, Christina Kirk and Randall Jaynes.

== Cast ==
- Karl Geary as Kevin Sinks
- Stéphanie Szostak as Ro Mars
- Larry Fessenden as Jim Mullins
- Christina Kirk as Susanna Sinks
- Pell James as Annie
- Randall Jaynes as Mark
- Neil Jain as Rick
- Jessica Lawson as Catherine
- Joe Martine as Backseat guy
- Lawrence Scaduto as Party goer
- Stephen Barker Turner as Matt Muttel

== Release ==
The film opened in New York City on 9 August 2006.

== Reception ==
Stephen Holden of The New York Times wrote that while it is "not a profound film", it "touches a chord" and "captures the wistful underside of the rampant materialism embraced by the young professional class."

Matt Singer of The Village Voice wrote, "Nice low-budget cinematography and authentic New York City locations aside, there's little to engage viewers over the course of 100 wandering minutes."

Tyler Foster of DVD Talk rated the film 1.5 stars out of 5, and called it a "jumbled, dissatisfying mess, one that would've been better left on the shelf."
