= Stéphanie Szostak =

French actress (born 1975)

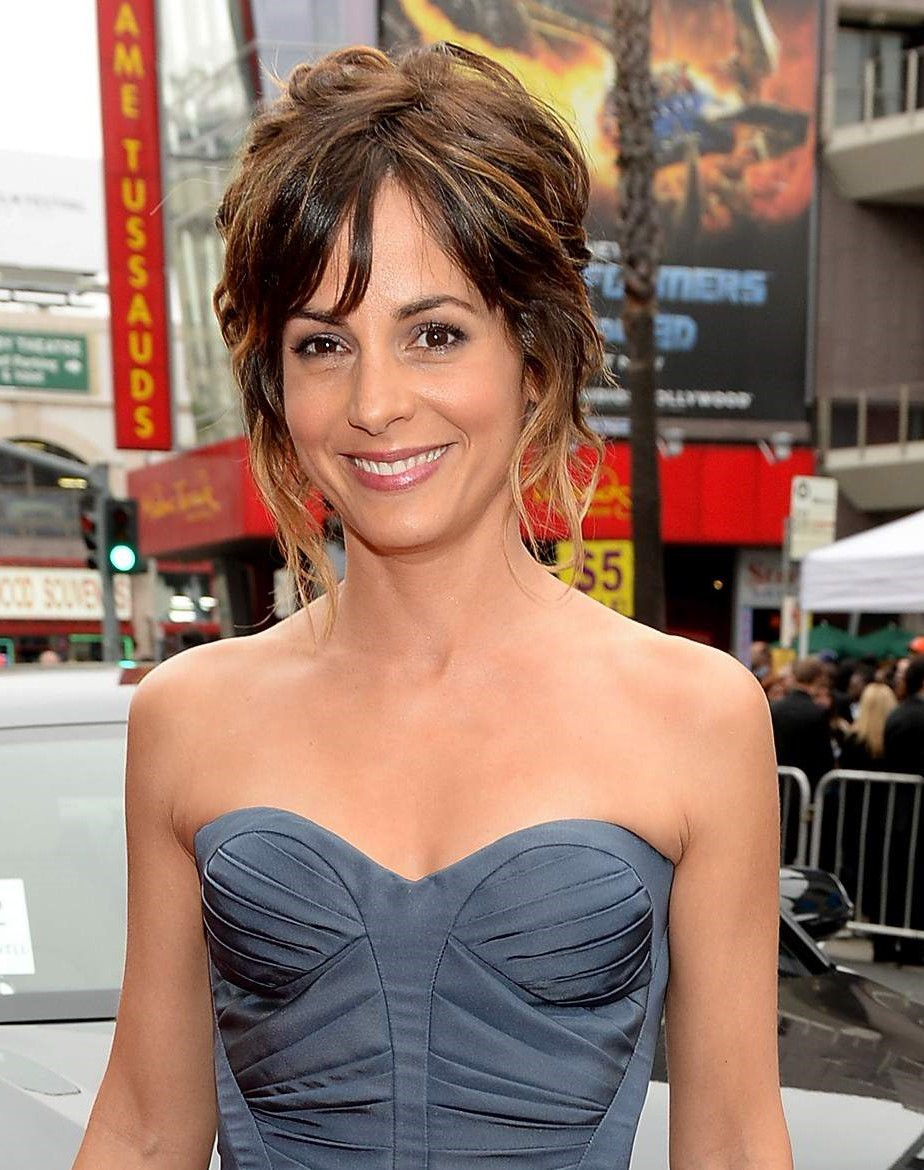
- Stephanie Szostak (2014)
- Born: Paris, France
- Education: College of William & Mary
- Occupation: Actress
- Years active: 2003–present
- Spouse: Britt Szostak (m. 1996)
- Children: 2

Stéphanie Szostak is a French actress and author who started her career in the early 2000s. Szostak is best known for having appeared in the films The Devil Wears Prada, Dinner for Schmucks, Iron Man 3, and R.I.P.D. Szostak starred in the USA Network original drama series Satisfaction and the ABC series A Million Little Things.

== Personal life ==
Szostak was raised in the suburbs of Paris, France. She moved to the United States to study business at the College of William & Mary in Williamsburg, Virginia, where she played on the women's varsity golf team. After graduating with a Bachelor of Science in marketing, she moved to New York City and worked for Chanel in marketing. She then switched to acting after taking acting classes.

Szostak married Britt Szostak in 1996; her married surname is Polish. They have two sons together, and reside outside New York City.

== Filmography ==
=== Film ===
Year	Title	Role	Notes
2003	Si' Laraby	Nadezhda	
2004	Zimove vesilya	Nina	Short film
2005	Satellite	Ro Mars	Bend Film Festival, Best Actress
2006	Cosa Bella	Delphine	Short film
2006	The Devil Wears Prada	Jacqueline Follet	
2008	Eavesdrop	French woman	
2008	Life in Flight	Alex	
2008	The Sexes	Florence Leaming	Short film
2008	Letting Go	Estella	
2009	Four Single Fathers	Monique	
2009	The Good Heart	Sarah	
2009	Motherhood	Sandrine Dumas	
2009	The Rebound	Alice Marnier	
2009	How to Seduce Difficult Women	Gigi	
2010	Something Fun	Katy	
2010	Dinner for Schmucks	Julie	
2011	We Bought a Zoo	Katherine Mee	
2013	Gimme Shelter	Joanna Fitzpatrick	
2013	Iron Man 3	Ellen Brandt	
2013	R.I.P.D.	Julia Walker	
2014	Hit By Lightning	Danita Jacobs	
2025	Soul on Fire	Susan O'Leary	

=== Television ===
Year	Title	Role	Notes
2006	The Sopranos	woman	Episode: "Soprano Home Movies"
2008	Law & Order: Criminal Intent	Caroline Walters	2 episodes
2009	Une aventure New-Yorkaise (A New York Thing)	Marie	TV movie
2010	Lafayette: The Lost Hero	Adrienne de La Fayette	TV movie
2014–2015	Satisfaction	Grace Truman	Main cast
2016	The Blacklist	Josephine	Episode: "Alistair Pitt"
2018	Bull	Annabel	Episode: "Grey Areas"
2018	Younger	Sophia Bell	Episode: "The Bubble"
2018–2023	A Million Little Things	Delilah Dixon	Main cast (season 1–4); Guest role (season 5)
2026	Law & Order	Carol Massey	season 25 episode 14 "Remedies"
