= Bauer (play) =

Bauer is a play by Lauren Gunderson. It had its world premiere in March 2014 at the San Francisco Playhouse, the same theatre that commissioned it. Based on the life of the German painter Rudolf Bauer, the play tells the story of how, after having arrived in the United States of America at the beginning of World War II, Bauer was tricked by fellow German artist and love of his life, Hilla von Rebay, into signing a contract that gave Solomon R. Guggenheim the legal rights to all of his paintings and any future works he created. The play triggered a retrospective of Bauer's work at the Weinstein Gallery in San Francisco.

== Plot ==
The play begins in January 1953 at Bauer's beachfront mansion in Deal, New Jersey.

According to the Dramatist Play Service, Bauer is the story of a painter who does not want to paint and the despair it brings him and his wife. Starring only three actors, this play explores the depths of greed, betrayal, love, the freedom of painting, and the freedom of refusing to paint.

== Characters ==
- Rudolf Bauer: The tortured title character who battles the urge to paint with the feeling of not being able to do so because of the position he is in of no longer owning what he creates.
- Louise Bauer: Bauer's caring wife, who, in a last desperate attempt to make her husband paint again, invites his ex-lover Hilla Rebay to their home.
- Hilla Rebay: Bauer's long-gone German lover who started a relationship with Guggenheim and made Bauer sign the contract giving up his art.

=== Original cast ===
- Ronald Guttman as Rudolf Bauer
- Stacy Ross as Hilla Rebay
- Susi Damilano as Louise Bauer
