= Sean Campion =

Irish actor

- Born: 20 December 1959 (age 66); Freshford, County Kilkenny, Ireland
- Occupation: Actor

Sean Campion (born 20 December 1959) is an Irish actor known for his portrayal as Virginio Orsini in the historical drama television series Borgia. In theatre, he is best known for his portrayal as Jake Quinn in Marie Jones's Stones in His Pockets which he was nominated for a Laurence Olivier Award for Best Actor and for which he received a Drama Desk Special Award. His notable feature film appearances are Goldfish Memory and Hallmark Hall of Fame's The Blackwater Lightship.

== Career ==
=== Television and film career ===
Campion first started his career in 1985, in the television film Cúirt an Mheán Oíche which is based on Siobhan McKenna's dramatic adaptation of Brian Merriman's 18th century poem. In 1988, he starred in the RTÉ One/Channel 4 four-part television miniseries period drama, Echoes, based on the novel of the same name by Maeve Binchy.

In 2003, Campion starred in Goldfish Memory, about a small group of characters experiencing relationships which build and crumble before the viewers eyes. The following year in 2004, Campion appeared in the Hallmark Hall of Fame TV movie adaptation of Colm Tóibín's novel The Blackwater Lightship, alongside Angela Lansbury, Dianne Wiest and Gina McKee. It aired on CBS on 4 February 2004.

In 2005, Campion guest-starred as Mike in the BBC One soap opera EastEnders. He also guest-starred as Cliff Healy in the BBC One medical drama television series Holby City.

In 2011, Campion has a recurring role as Virginio Orsini in the historical drama television series Borgia, which recounts the Borgia family's rise to power and subsequent domination of the Papal States during the Renaissance.

In 2014, Campion starred in the French film United Passions, about the origins of the world governing body of association football, Fédération Internationale de Football Association (FIFA).

=== Theatre career ===
In 2009, Campion played Benedick in Timothy Sheader's production of William Shakespeare's Much Ado About Nothing at the Regent's Park Open Air Theatre, alongside Samantha Spiro, who played Beatrice.

Campion played the role of the mother in Selma Dimitrijevic's production of her play titled Gods Are Fallen and All Safety Gone, alongside Scott Turnbull who played the role of the daughter, and presented by Grayscale. The play revolves on what happens when people discover that parents are flawed human beings as people are, through the interactions of a mother (portrayed by Campion) and a daughter (portrayed by Turnbull). In 2015 and 2016-2017 he also appeared in the premiere of All the Angels, a biographical play on the Dublin premiere of Handel's Messiah.

== Filmography ==
Films
Year	Title	Role	Notes
1999	Most Important	Solicitor	
2003	Goldfish Memory	Tom	
2004	Timbuktu	Cathal	
2009	Why Don't You Dance?	Tom	Short film
2009	Leaves	Michael	
2014	United Passions	Werner Lutzi	

Television
Year	Title	Role	Notes
2005	The Blackwater Lightship	Michael Breen	Hallmark Hall of Fame television movie
2005	EastEnders	Mike	Episode: "8 April 2005"
2006	Holby City	Mike	Episode: "Roots"
2012	Vera	Guthrie	Episode "A Certain Samartain"
2019	Father Brown	Patrick O’Leary	Episode "The House of God"
