= Alan Gilsenan =

Irish film director and producer

Alan Gilsenan is an Irish writer, filmmaker and theatre director. His most recent work include the award-winning cinema documentary The Days of Trees, the feature film Unless, based on a novel by Carol Shields and The Meeting, which he wrote and directed and premiered at the 2018 Dublin Film Festival.

Gilsenan is a former chairperson of the Irish Film Institute. He also served on the Irish Film Board, and on the board of the International Dance Festival Ireland. Between 2009 and 2014, Gilsenan served on the board of Raidió Teilifís Éireann, where he chaired the Editorial and Creative Output Committee. He is currently on the Board of Fighting Words, a creative writing centre for young people founded by Sean Love & novelist Roddy Doyle.

== Early life ==
Born in County Meath in Ireland, Gilsenan grew up on Raglan Road in Ballsbridge in Dublin, where he attended St. Conleth's College.

A graduate of Trinity College Dublin – he won First Class Honours in Modern English and Sociology – Gilsenan received the inaugural A.J. Leventhal Scholarship. He was also editor of Piranha magazine while at Trinity.

Gilsenan's grandfather was James John O' Shee (3 November 1866 – 1 January 1946), usually known as J.J. O' Shee was an Irish nationalist politician, solicitor, labour activist and Member of Parliament in the British House of Commons representing the constituency of West Waterford from 1895 until 1918.

== Career in Film ==
Having made an acclaimed film of Samuel Beckett's TV drama, Eh Joe, Gilsenan came to note with his controversial, award-winning documentary for the U.K.'s Channel 4 The Road to God Knows Where in 1990. With producer Martin Mahon, he formed Yellow Asylum Films and made a number of documentaries on challenging aspects of Irish life. These include The Asylum (a four-hour portrait of Portrane Psychiatric Hospital), The Hospice (inside St Francis Hospice), The Home (about old age), I See A Darkness (about suicide in Ireland), and A Time to Die (on euthanasia).

Gilsenan's Other major documentary work includes

- Eliza Lynch: Queen of Paraguay, a drama-documentary with Maria Doyle Kennedy in the title role which premiered at the London Film Festival;
- God Bless America, a series for ITV in the United Kingdom, six portraits of U.S. cities through the eyes of American authors, including Gore Vidal, Neil Simon, Patricia Cornwell and Garrison Keillor;
- The Irish Empire, the opening and closing episodes of a five-hour history of Irish emigration;
- The Green Fields of France, a poetic meditation on the Irish who died fighting in World War I;
- Maura’s Story, the story of a young Irish-American woman who became a Buddhist saint in Japan;
- Ó Pheann an Phiarsaigh, a film-poem inspired by the creative writings of Patrick Pearse;
- The Ghost of Roger Casement, a feature documentary on Roger Casement, the international humanitarian and Irish rebel;
- The Irish Mind, a four-part look at the defining qualities of the Irish across the globe (in association with the IDA for RTE and CNBC in the USA).
- Four Days in November, a one-hour documentary about the Ireland national rugby union team successes during the autumn of 2016.

Gilsenan's earlier film career includes the short thriller Zulu 9 as well as two experimental feature films All Souls’ Day and Timbuktu.

In 2016, Gilsenan wrote and directed the feature film Unless, starring Catherine Keener, based upon the novel of Carol Shields. It received its world premiere at the Toronto Film Festival. Gilsenan's last feature, The Meeting, premiered at the 2018 Dublin International Film Festival. A controversial film where the victim of an unforgivable crime, confronts her attacker.

Gilsenan's works also include a documentary on the folk singer Liam Clancy entitled The Yellow Bittern; as well as portraits of the poet Paul Durcan in The Dark School, the visual artist Sean Scully in The Bloody Canvas and the playwright Tom Murphy in Sing On Forever. He also made the experimental cinema documentary A Vision: A Life of WB Yeats.

Gilsenan has received four Irish Film & Television Awards (IFTAs), most recently for The Days of Trees, winner of the 2024 IFTA George Morrison Feature Documentary Award, and six IFTA nominations as both director and production designer.

== Career in Theatre ==
Gilsenan's theatre work includes:

- his own adaptation of John Banville's The Book of Evidence at the Kilkenny Arts Festival and Dublin's Gate Theatre;
- Tom Murphy's plays The Patriot Game (world premiere production) and On The Outside and On The Inside at the Abbey Theatre
- Tom MacIntyre's What Happened Bridgie Cleary at the Abbey Theatre;
- Jean Genet's The Balcony (which he also designed)at the Focus Theatre
- Tennessee Williams’ Small Craft Warnings at the Focus Theatre;
- Shakespeare's Hamlet for the Naked Theatre
- Steven Berkoff's Decadence for the Naked Theatre;
- Samuel Beckett's Footfalls at the Gate Theatre and London's Barbican Centre;
- Knives In Hens by David Harrower at Dublin's Smock Alley Theatre;
- a dance theatre piece The Burning House at the Dublin Dance Festival 2012.

== Filmography ==
=== Director ===
- Eh Joe, 1988.
- The Road to God Knows Where, 1988.
- Stories from the Silence, 1990.
- Prophet Songs, 1991.
- Between Heaven and Woolworths, 1992.
- God Bless America ITV Documentary Series 1995–97.
- All Soul's Day, 1997.
- The Irish Empire, TV series documentary, 2000.
- Zulu 9, short film, 2001.
- The Ghost of Roger Casement, 2002.
- Sing on Forever, 2003.
- Timbuktu, 2004.
- The Asylum, 2006.
- The Hospice, 2007.
- Paul Durcan: The Dark School, 2007.
- The Irish Mind, 2008.
- The Yellow Bittern:The Life and Times of Liam Clancy, documentary, 2009.
- Treasure of the Bogs, 2011.
- Eliza Lynch, Queen of Paraguay, 2013.
- A Vision: A Life of W.B. Yeats, 2014.
- Unless, 2016.
- Meetings with Ivor, 2017.
- The Meeting, 2018.
- Daniel O'Connell: Forgotten King of Ireland, 2019
- The Days of Trees, 2023.
