= Surveillance (2008 film) =

2008 film by Jennifer Lynch

- Directed by: Jennifer Lynch
- Written by: Jennifer Lynch; Kent Harper
- Produced by: Marco Mehlitz
- Starring: Bill Pullman; Julia Ormond; Pell James; Ryan Simpkins
- Cinematography: Peter Wunstorf
- Edited by: Daryl K. Davis
- Music by: Todd Bryanton
- Production companies: Arclight Films; Blue Rider Pictures; Lago Film
- Distributed by: Magnet Releasing
- Release dates: May 21, 2008 (Cannes); September 30, 2011 (United States)
- Running time: 97 minutes
- Country: United States
- Language: English
- Box office: $1.1 million

Surveillance is a 2008 American thriller film co-written and directed by Jennifer Lynch and starring Julia Ormond, Bill Pullman, Pell James, Michael Ironside and French Stewart. The story is set in the Nebraska plains of United States. The film premiered "out of competition" and appeared in a midnight slot at the 2008 Cannes Film Festival. Surveillance is Lynch's second feature film, following a fifteen-year break after Boxing Helena.

== Plot ==
A series of violent deaths and the disappearance of a young woman bring FBI agents Sam Hallaway and Elizabeth Anderson to a town in rural Nebraska. They meet the three survivors of a mysterious bloodbath; the young Stephanie, the cocaine-addicted Bobbi Prescott, and the foul-mouthed police officer Jack Bennett. Hallaway watches the trio's respective interviews with Captain Billings and officers Wright and Degrasso, where they tell the story of what brought them there.

In a warped way to pass the day, Bennett and his partner Officer Jim Conrad watch (both hidden from view) and shoot the tires of cars driving along an isolated county road, then convince the drivers their tires blew out as a result of their speeding and threaten them afterwards. They do so to one young couple, Keith and Tina, then let them go.

Sometime later, Stephanie, traveling on vacation with her family, sees Keith and Tina's car with blood on it and informs her oblivious mother. Bobbi, using drugs with her boyfriend Johnny, is in a car right behind them. At a rest stop, Stephanie and Bobbi learn a pair of killers are responsible for a string of murders and likely the woman's disappearance. Stephanie's stepfather Steven supposedly speeds and their car's tire is shot by Bennett. Bobbi and Johnny are about to offer help but Bennett and Conrad arrive and harass all of them, forcing Steven to put Conrad's gun into his mouth and making Bobbi swear at Johnny. After all of this, Stephanie tells Bennett and Conrad about the bloody car she saw earlier and they leave to investigate.

Steven begins changing the tire and Bobbi gets out to talk with Stephanie's family, who all feel violated by Bennett and Conrad. After passing a white van, Bennett and Conrad simultaneously discover the car Stephanie described further down the road with evidence of an altercation and race back towards the van. The van plows into the back of Johnny's car, killing him and Steven. A dead man is at the wheel and a live person, covered in a black bag, is sitting in the passenger seat of the van, whom Bobbi tries to save. Bennett and Conrad arrive back at the scene. In the chaos, Conrad is killed and people emerge from the van wearing rubber masks, kill Stephanie's mother and brother David and knock Bennett unconscious. Stephanie and Bobbi take refuge in the police car.

Meanwhile, Hallaway and Anderson are trying to figure everything out when bodies are discovered in a motel nearby. Anderson takes Wright and Degrasso to the scene, leaving Hallaway with Bobbi, Billings, Bennett and Stephanie, who whispers something in Hallaway's ear after Anderson leaves. Hallaway talks with the three others, while Degrasso discovers nude pictures of Anderson and Hallaway. Looking through them in Anderson's backseat, Degrasso is shocked to see the agents with the body of a dead woman. While he is looking through the photos, Anderson has been closely watching his facial expressions in the rearview mirror. She quickly makes the connection that he has spotted her and Halloway and knows he is beginning to suspect the two are not FBI agents but are actually the serial killers. Before he can react, Anderson shoots both Degrasso and Wright dead, then dumps both bodies by the roadside. Hallaway's behavior, meanwhile, is becoming increasingly bizarre and violent. He gradually reveals he was at the bloodbath earlier and he also states that he and Anderson are indeed the killers. Hallaway kills Billings and when Anderson returns, Bennett is also murdered. The agents turn their attention to Bobbi. She is murdered by Halloway via strangulation in a manner revealing that not only are they serial murderers but also sexual sadists.

A phone message left at the police station reveals the bodies at the motel are those of the missing woman and two real FBI Agents. As Anderson and Hallaway drive away, they see Stephanie standing out in a field by the side of the road. Hallaway relates to Anderson that Stephanie was onto them all along so he let her go free. Anderson tells Hallaway, "I think that's the most romantic thing in the whole world." Stephanie watches their vehicle disappear into the distance.

== Cast ==
- Julia Ormond as Elizabeth Anderson
- Bill Pullman as Sam Hallaway
- Pell James as Bobbi Prescott
- Ryan Simpkins as Stephanie
- Michael Ironside as Captain Billings
- French Stewart as Officer Jim Conrad
- Kent Harper as Officer Jack Bennett
- Mac Miller as Johnny
- Hugh Dillon as Steven
- Cheri Oteri as Mom
- Kent Wolkowski as David
- Charlie Newmark as Officer Wright
- Gill Gayle as Officer Degrasso

== Production ==
Different film stocks were processed in alternate ways to provide the varying states of minds and perspectives that belong to the characters in the film: the local police officers Jim Conrad (French Stewart) and Jack Bennett (Kent Harper)'s point-of-view is sepia toned, to reflect their power, while over-saturation was employed for illicit drug-using couple Bobbi Prescott (Pell James) and Johnny (Mac Miller) and a "super sharp and super clear" depiction for the young girl Stephanie (Ryan Simpkins).

== Reception ==
=== Critical response ===
Overall, reviews of the film were mixed. The aggregator website Rotten Tomatoes reported a 55% approval rating with an average score of 5.19/10, based on 76 reviews. The website's consensus reads, "This dark psycho-thriller from Jennifer Lynch, is violent, sharp and baffling, but not to everyone's taste." On Metacritic the film achieved a score of 31 out of 100 based on 12 reviews, which indicates "generally unfavorable reviews".

=== Accolades ===
In October 2008, the film took the top prize at the Sitges Film Festival. The film made history at the New York City Horror Film Festival when Jennifer Lynch became the first female to win the Best Director award and Ryan Simpkins became the first child to win the Best Actress award at the fest.

== See also ==
- List of films featuring surveillance
