= Happy Here and Now =

2002 mystery film

- Film poster
- Directed by: Michael Almereyda
- Written by: Michael Almereyda
- Produced by: Callum Greene; Anthony Katagas
- Starring: David Arquette; Liane Balaban; Gloria Reuben; Ally Sheedy; Karl Geary
- Cinematography: Jonathan Herron
- Edited by: Kristina Boden
- Music by: David Julyan
- Production companies: IFC Productions; Keep Your Head
- Distributed by: IFC Films
- Release dates: June 8, 2002 (CineVegas); December 14, 2005 (United States)
- Running time: 89 minutes
- Country: United States
- Language: English

Happy Here and Now is a 2002 mystery drama film directed by Michael Almereyda. The film stars David Arquette, Liane Balaban, Gloria Reuben, Ally Sheedy, and Karl Geary. Happy Here and Now had its world premiere at the CineVegas film festival in June 2002 and subsequently went on to screen at the Toronto International Film Festival that September. The film did not receive a limited theatrical release until December 14, 2005, three years after the film debuted.

It won a Special Jury Prize at SXSW in 2003 and was also nominated for an Independent Spirit Award in 2004.

== Plot ==
When Muriel, an unhappy young woman, goes missing, her worried sister Amelia desperately searches the Internet for a clue to her sibling's whereabouts. Amelia is guided by mysterious webcam footage found on Muriel's laptop and is aided by Bill, a private investigator. Amelia's search leads her deep into New Orleans’ underbelly.

== Cast ==
- Karl Geary as Eddie Mars / Tom
- Shalom Harlow as Muriel
- Clarence Williams III as Bill
- Ally Sheedy as Lois
- Gloria Reuben as Hannah
- David Arquette as Eddie
- Billy Slaughter as Napoleon Bonaparte
- Liane Balaban as Amelia

== Reception ==
Happy Here and Now has a 48% on review aggregate site Rotten Tomatoes based on 21 reviews. The critics consensus reads, "Happy Here and Now has a rich setting and some interesting ideas, but the story frustratingly refuses to spark to life."

IndieWire commented the film is "unsure of its ideas"—which are the questions "How is that someone can go missing with all the means at hand to stay in touch?" and "Given all the means we have to keep in touch with each other, why don’t we go missing more often?" The review conceded, "somehow, in the midst of all of these discontinuities and missed connections, Almereyda, miraculously, answers both of his questions, and shapes a cast of characters worthy of the emotional resolution granted them."

Jason Buchanan of AllMovie gave the film 3 out of 5 stars and described it as "an obscure and disturbing study in the nature of avatars in the age of technological isolation."

Jeremiah Kipp of Slant Magazine reviewed the film positively, writing "What might seem like a cold and remote, entirely theoretical, and abstract intellectual exercise is given fresh life, even poetry, by the cityscape in which the tale is set: New Orleans. Almereyda made the film in 2001, intending the story to take place five minutes from now—but instead it feels like some kind of elegy for a ghost city, adding deeper resonance to the story of Muriel, whom it is suggested disappeared into the Internet itself. What once was present no longer exists, and yet there remains an indescribable resonance."

=== Accolades ===
Happy Here and Now won the special jury award for narrative feature at SXSW in 2003. It received a nomination for the Producers Award at the 2004 Independent Spirit Awards.
