= Remember Me (2016 film) =

- Poster
- Directed by: Steve Goldbloom
- Written by: Steve Goldbloom
- Produced by: Heather Haggarty; Nanou Matteson
- Starring: Steve Goldbloom; Rita Moreno
- Cinematography: Justin Chin
- Edited by: Zach Land Miller
- Music by: Nora Kroll-Rosenbaum
- Production company: Sparklight Films
- Release date: March 5, 2016 (Cinequest)
- Running time: 83 minutes
- Country: United States
- Language: English

Remember Me is a 2016 American comedy film written by, directed by and starring Steve Goldbloom and featuring Rita Moreno. It is Goldbloom's feature directorial debut.

== Cast ==
- Steve Goldbloom as Vincent Seder
- Joel Kelley Dauten as Barry Sachs
- Rita Moreno as Nanna/Gloria Sachs
- Ray Reinhardt as Pappy/Lou Sachs
- Zach Land Miller as Isaac
- Corey Jackson as Marshall
- Pamela Gaye Walker as Dr. Gale McInerney
- Miranda Kahn as Nadine
- Michael Valladares as Paul
- Jeff Kazanjian as Jeff
- Heidi Godt as Elisha
- Melissa Locsin as Jo
- Liz Kennedy as Anne
- Alexander Matteson as Max
- Jonathan Levine as Jason

== Release ==
The film premiered at the Cinequest Film & Creativity Festival on March 5, 2016.

== Reception ==
Dennis Harvey of Variety gave the film a positive review and wrote that Moreno's "unpredictable performance in an underwritten role gooses things to an amiable degree."

Sheri Linden of The Hollywood Reporter also gave the film a positive review, calling it "...a pleasing balance between sincerity and irreverence."

Kimber Myers of the Los Angeles Times gave the film a negative review and wrote, "Other than the buoyant presence of Oscar winner Rita Moreno, “Remember Me” is a charmless but harmless comedy about two cousins and their aging grandmother."
