= Noel Pearson (producer) =

Irish film and theatrical producer

Noel Pearson, a native of Dublin, is a film and theatrical producer.

== Film credits ==
Pearson's film credits include My Left Foot, which received five Academy Award nominations (including Best Picture), and won Oscars for Best Actor (Daniel Day-Lewis) and Best Supporting Actress (Brenda Fricker). The film also won other awards in Europe including a Donatello and a BAFTA. He also produced The Field, Frankie Starlight, Gold in the Streets, and Dancing at Lughnasa. Another film, Lulu, based on the life of iconic actress Louise Brooks was planned but apparently never materialized.

== Stage productions on Broadway ==
Pearson has produced numerous plays in Ireland, Britain, and the United States. His Broadway productions include Joan Denise Moriarty's ballet Playboy of the Western World (1979), Dancing at Lughnasa (a Tony Award winner, by Brian Friel), Someone Who'll Watch Over Me (by Frank McGuinness) and An Inspector Calls (a Tony Award winner, by J.B. Priestley).
