= Lauren Gunderson =

American dramatist (born 1982)

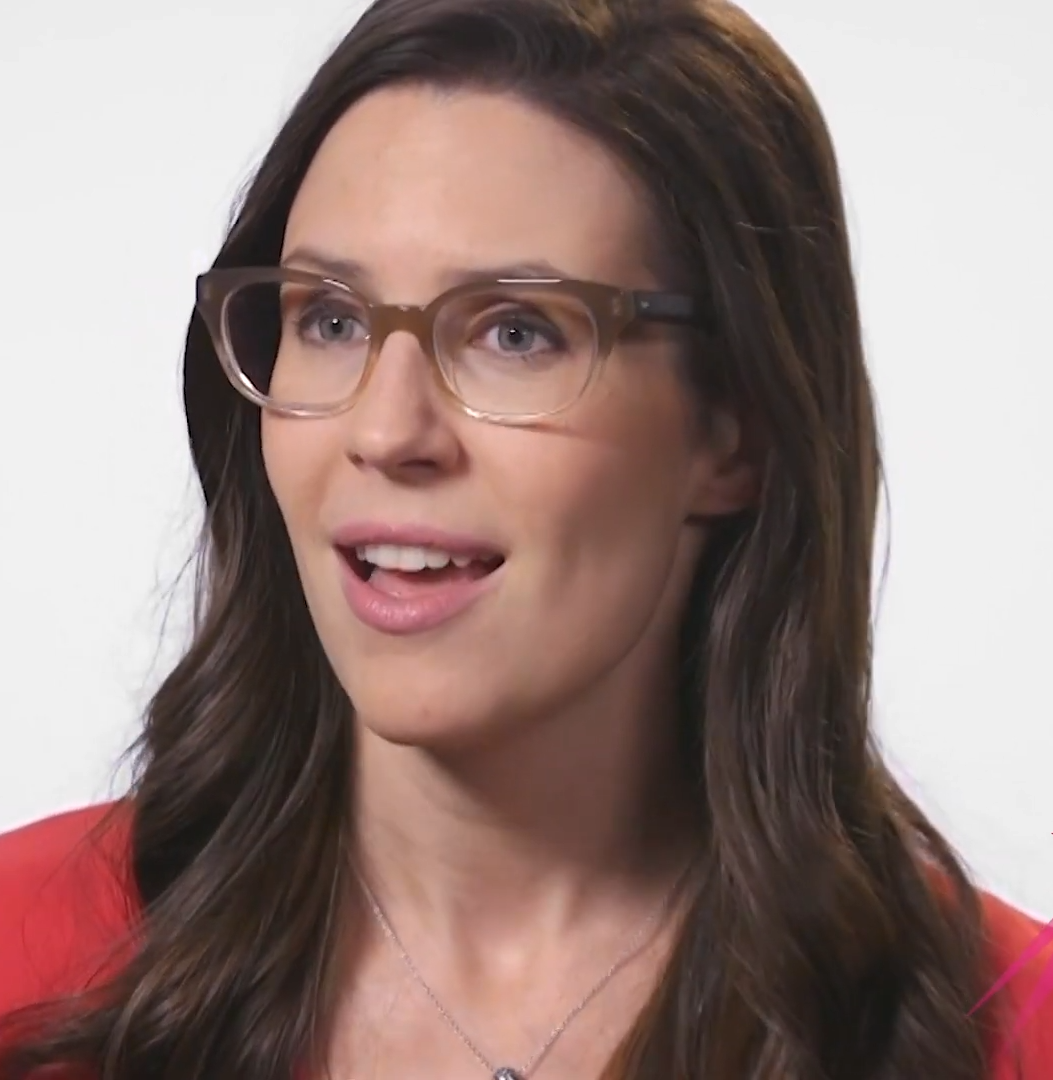
- Gunderson in 2020
- Born: February 2, 1982 (age 44); Atlanta, Georgia
- Education: Emory University (BA); New York University (MFA)
- Occupation: Playwright
- Notable work: Silent Sky Miss Bennet: Christmas at Pemberley I and You
- Spouse: Nathan Wolfe (m. 2012; sep. 2025)
- Website: http://laurengunderson.com/

Lauren Gunderson (born February 5, 1982) is an American playwright, screenwriter, and short story author who was born in Atlanta. She lived in San Francisco but is now in London. Gunderson was recognized by American Theatre magazine as America's most produced living playwright at Theatre Communications Group (TCG, the magazine's publisher) member theaters in 2017, in 2019–20, and 2025-26.

== Life and career ==
=== Early years, personal life and education ===
Gunderson, born in Atlanta, Georgia, attended Decatur High School, and first earned her Bachelor of Arts in Creative Writing from Emory University in 2004, and her Master of Fine Arts in Dramatic Writing from New York University's Tisch School of the Arts in 2009, where she was also a Reynolds Fellow in Social Entrepreneurship.

She married virologist Nathan Wolfe in 2012. They separated in October 2025. They have 2 sons.

=== Career ===
Lauren Gunderson began her career with a passion for storytelling that highlights remarkable female figures in history, science, and literature. She is one of the top 20 most-produced playwrights in the country, and has been America's most produced living playwright since 2016. She has had over twenty plays produced, including I and You, Émilie: La Marquise Du Châtelet Defends Her Life Tonight, Parts They Call Deep, and Background.

She has ranked among America’s most produced playwrights since 2015 (American Theatre Magazine), leading the list three times, most recently for the 2022–23 season.

In 2026, it was revealed that Gunderson's name appeared in the Epstein files nine times. These correspondences were mostly related to various invitations and announcements sent from Gunderson to Jeffrey Epstein, including an invitation to her and Nathan Wolfe's wedding and an invitation to their yacht party. Gunderson denies ever meeting Epstein, though a 2010 email from Epstein to Wolfe discusses a recent dinner they shared, stating "your fiance is great... that was fun". Gunderson disputes that she was at the dinner. On February 3, 2026, The Contemporary Theater Company in Wakefield, Rhode Island, announced it was cancelling a planned 2026 production of Gunderson's play The Revolutionists because of her and her ex-husband's alleged ties to Jeffrey Epstein.

=== Parts They Call Deep and Background ===
Gunderson's first play, Parts They Call Deep, premiered in 2001, exploring complex emotional and psychological themes in young adults. It won the 2002 Young Playwrights National Playwriting Competition and was produced Off-Broadway by Young Playwrights Inc. as part of the Young Playwrights Festival at the Cherry Lane Theater.

in 2005, Gunderson premiered Background, a play which centers on physicist Ralph Alpher and his contributions to science. It won the Essential Theatre Prize in 2004 and was published in 2009 in Isotope: A Literary Journal of Nature and Science Writing (issue 7.2).

=== Émilie: La Marquise Du Châtelet Defends Her Life Tonight (2010) ===
Émilie: La Marquise Du Châtelet Defends Her Life Tonight, about the real-life 18th-century physicist Émilie du Châtelet, was commissioned and developed at South Coast Repertory as part of their 2008 Pacific Playwrights Festival directed by Kate Whorisky. It was produced the following year directed by David Emmes. On 25 January 2011, it opened in West Seattle, at Arts West Theater. It is published by Samuel French, Inc. (2010). Émilie received its European and British premiere in Oxford, UK during February 2014.

=== I and You ===
I and You is a poignant drama that explores the relationship between two high school students—one suffering from illness and the other grappling with social anxiety—as they connect over a shared study project. The play won the 2014 Harold and Mimi Steinberg/American Theatre Critics Association New Play Award and was a finalist for the 2014 Susan Smith Blackburn Prize. It has been widely produced internationally, including a notable 2018 production at Hampstead Theatre starring Maisie Williams.

I & You: The Musical, a rock musical adaptation of the play, will premiere at McCarter Theatre Center in September 2025. This will be a co-production with Olney Theatre Center.

=== Christmas at Pemberley Trilogy ===
Lauren Gunderson and Margot Melcon's Christmas at Pemberley trilogy reimagines Jane Austen's beloved characters from Pride and Prejudice during the Christmas season. Each play focuses on different characters and their experiences at the Pemberley estate. Gunderson received a 3-year residency with the Marin Theatre Company, with this being their first production of her work and the beginning of a four-production collaboration.

- Miss Bennet: Christmas at Pemberley (2016)

This play centers on Mary Bennet, the bookish middle sister, as she navigates the holiday season at Pemberley. An unexpected guest sparks Mary's hopes for independence, intellectual connection, and possibly love. Themes include self-discovery and family dynamics during the festive season. The production premiered at Northlight Theatre, Round House Theatre and Marin Theatre Company.

- The Wickhams: Christmas at Pemberley (2018)

This play focuses on the servants’ quarters at Pemberley during Christmas. Mrs. Reynolds, the housekeeper, and other staff prepare for the holiday festivities when Mr. Wickham, Lydia's husband, arrives unexpectedly. Themes include class, forgiveness, and the hidden lives of those serving the Darcy family. The play premiered at the Marin Theatre Company, where Miss Bennett premiered two years prior.

- Georgiana and Kitty: Christmas at Pemberley (2021)

The final play follows Georgiana Darcy and Kitty Bennet as they navigate love, ambition, and sisterhood during the Christmas season. Georgiana, an accomplished pianist, and Kitty, a hopeful optimist, celebrate personal growth and friendship amid holiday cheer. The play premiered again at Marin Theatre Company in a co-production with Jungle Theater in Minneapolis and Northlight Theatre.

=== The Revolutionists ===
A comedic and feminist take on four revolutionary women during the French Revolution, including Olympe de Gouges and Charlotte Corday, this play combines humor and political urgency. The play premiered at Cincinnati Playhouse in the Park in 2016, and has been produced widely, praised for its sharp wit and empowering themes.

=== The Book of Will ===
The Book of Will dramatizes the efforts of William Shakespeare’s colleagues to compile and publish his First Folio after his death, blending historical research with emotional storytelling. The play premiered at Denver Center Theatre Company in 2017 and has been praised for its rich exploration of literary legacy and friendship.

== Biographical Works about Women ==
Lauren Gunderson’s plays have been praised for their feminist themes and prominently feature strong female characters. She has written several notable works centered on real historical women, bringing their stories and contributions to the stage.

=== Silent Sky ===
Silent Sky tells the story of astronomer Henrietta Leavitt, whose groundbreaking work on variable stars laid foundations for modern astrophysics despite significant gender barriers. Since its premiere at South Coast Repertory in 2011, it has received critical acclaim and multiple productions, spotlighting women’s contributions to science.

=== Jeannette ===
Gunderson wrote the book to the musical We Won't Sleep, about U.S. Rep. Jeannette Rankin, the first woman elected to Congress. The music and lyrics were written by Arianna Afsar. Under the title Jeannette, it was part of the 2019 summer series at the National Music Theater Conference at the Eugene O'Neill Theater Center in Connecticut. Jeanette had its world premiere at the Tony Award-winning Signature Theatre in Arlington, Virginia in 2022.

=== Justice ===
Gunderson next wrote the book to the musical Justice, about the first three female Supreme Court Justices, Sandra Day O'Connor, Ruth Bader Ginsburg and Sonia Sotomayor. The musical, with music by Bree Lowdermilk and lyrics by Kait Kerrigan, premiered at the Arizona Theatre Company in 2022, and has subsequently been produced at many regional theatres.

=== Billie Jean ===
Billie Jean, a play by Gunderson based on the life of tennis legend Billie Jean King premiered at Chicago Shakespeare Theatre in 2025. The play dramatizes King's iconic 1973 "Battle of the Sexes" match against Bobby Riggs, highlighting her journey and the broader fight for gender equality in sports, along with her sexuality and advocacy for women's, gay and trans rights. Chilina Kennedy starred as Billie Jean King.

== Activism ==
Gunderson has made some of her plays available for activist purposes and is touted as an Arts meets Activism writer.

=== The Taming ===
The Taming is an all-female political farce which premiered at Crowded Fire Theater Company in 2013. Inspired by Shakespeare's The Taming of the Shrew, The Taming explores what happens when a beauty queen with a constitutional law degree, a Republican senator's aide, and a liberal online influencer are all locked in a hotel together, trying to make a better America. Gunderson made this play free to produce on the night of the 2017 presidential inauguration of Donald Trump, citing her belief that theater, art, and stories have the ability to make lasting change.

=== Natural Shocks ===
In April 2018, Gunderson created a national campaign of theater activism with royalty-free readings of her play Natural Shocks to address domestic violence and gun violence against women. Theaters across the U.S. participated in these readings including, The Know Theatre, Marin Shakespeare Company, and Cincinnati Shakespeare Company.

Gunderson stipulated that all proceeds from the productions be given to charitable causes.

== Works ==
Year	Work	Reference
2001	Parts They Call Deep	
2004	Leap	
2005	Background	
2005	Eye Of The Beheld	
2010	Émilie: La Marquise Du Châtelet Defends Her Life Tonight	
2011	The Amazing Adventures Of Dr. Wonderful And Her Dog!	
2011	Rock Creek: Southern Gothic	
2011	Silent Sky	
2012	Exit, Pursued By A Bear	
2012	We Are Denmark	
2013	By And By	
2013	Toil & Trouble	
2014	I And You	
2014	Fire Work	
2015	Ada And The Memory Engine	
2015	Bauer	
2015	The Taming	
2016	The Revolutionists	
2017	The Book of Will	
2017	Miss Bennet: Christmas at Pemberley	
2018	Natural Shocks	
2019	Jeannette (musical)	
2019	Earthrise	
2019	The Half-Life of Marie Curie	
2019	Peter Pan and Wendy	
2019	The Wickhams	
2020	The Heath	
2021	The Catastrophist	
2022	Justice	
2023	Anthropology	
2023	Artemisia	
2023	Georgiana and Kitty	
2024	Louisa May Alcott's Little Women	
2025	Billie Jean	
2026	Common Ground	

== Awards and nominations ==
Award	Year	Category	Work	Result	Ref.
Susan Smith Blackburn Prize	2014	Susan Smith Blackburn Prize	I & You	Nominated	
American Theatre Critics/Journalists Association	2014	The Harold and Mimi Steinberg/ ATCA New Play Award	I & You	Won	
Dramatists Guild of America Awards	2016	Lanford Wilson Award		Won	
Outer Critics Circle Awards	2016	John Gassner Playwrights Award	I & You	Nominated	
William Inge Theater Festival	2017	Otis Guernsey New Voices Award		Won	
American Theatre Critics/Journalists Association	2018	The Harold and Mimi Steinberg/ ATCA New Play Award	The Book of Will	Won	
