= The Burrowers =

2008 film

- Promotional film poster
- Directed by: J. T. Petty
- Written by: J. T. Petty
- Produced by: William Sherak; Jason Shuman
- Starring: William Mapother; Sean Patrick Thomas; Doug Hutchison; Karl Geary; Laura Leighton; Clancy Brown
- Cinematography: Phil Parmet
- Edited by: Andy Grieve; Robb Sullivan
- Music by: Joseph LoDuca
- Production companies: Lionsgate; Blue Star Pictures
- Distributed by: Lionsgate
- Release dates: September 9, 2008 (Toronto International Film Festival); April 21, 2009 (United States)
- Running time: 96 minutes
- Country: United States
- Language: English
- Budget: $7 million

The Burrowers is a 2008 American horror Western film written and directed by J. T. Petty. It stars Clancy Brown, William Mapother, Karl Geary, Sean Patrick Thomas, and Doug Hutchison. Set in 1879, the film follows a rescue party in search of a family whose mysterious vanishing brings them face to face with deadly tunnel-boring creatures.

The film premiered at the Toronto International Film Festival on September 9, 2008, before being released direct-to-DVD by Lionsgate on April 21, 2009. It received positive reviews from critics, with praise directed towards the story, Petty's direction, and its blending of film genres.

== Plot ==
In 1879, in the Dakota Territory, the Stewart family are attacked by a mysterious foe. A few corpses are discovered in the morning, but the rest of the family's whereabouts are unknown, including daughter Maryanne. Surrounding the houses are a group of mysterious holes in the ground. Presuming the kidnappers are hostile Native Americans, a military-backed search party, led by Henry Victor, is assembled. Tagging along are frontiersman John Clay and his Irish immigrant assistant Fergus Coffey, the latter of which is engaged to Maryanne. Other members include former soldier William Parcher, his girlfriend's teenage son Dobie Spacks, and former slave and Victor's chef, Walnut Callaghan.

The team forcefully capture a Sioux tribe member, whom Victor tortures for information. He tells them that the "Burrowers" have taste for human flesh, and the group mistakenly believes they're hunting a tribe of the same name. That night, four of Victor's men mysteriously vanish, and the same types of holes in the dirt are discovered nearby. Tensions rise in the group, and disgusted by Victor's distrust towards the Natives, Clay, Coffey, Parcher, Spacks, and Callaghan abandon the military escort and proceed on their own.

Following the mysterious holes, they discover a catatonic woman buried in one of them, bearing similar injuries to the corpses found back in the Stewart household. Spacks is entrusted to bring the woman back to Fort Lincoln, however that night he is ambushed by the Burrowers who kill the woman, paralyze him with a gash to the neck and bury him alive. Meanwhile, the others are flanked by Natives who shoot and kill Clay. They escape by burning poison oak to ward off the attackers, but are soon attacked by the Burrowers who inflict the same paralytic neck wound on Parcher.

Following a smoke signal, the group meets Faith, a Native woman whose family was killed by the Burrowers. She explains that the Burrowers are an ancient race who have inhabited the land since before the coming of humans and used to subsist on buffalo, but after white settlers hunted them to near-extinction, the Burrowers began preying on humans. They feed by lacing victims with a paralytic toxin by injury, who are then buried alive and eaten only after decomposition has begun. Faith then tells the group that Ute people have experience in combating the Burrowers and their poison. After another Burrower attack where Parcher accidentally shoots Callaghan's leg, they are intercepted by two Ute who kidnap a paralyzed and delirious Parcher. They leave behind a necklace made of previous Burrower victims, which contains a brooch that Coffey had given Maryanne. Realizing she is dead, a vengeful Coffey sets out to track down the Ute and discover the cure to the creatures' toxin.

After killing one of the Ute, Coffey discovers the other has tied Parcher to a tree log as bait, who claims they made him "drink something." Parcher injures the other Ute but before he can be rescued, Coffey's leg gets caught in a bear trap and the latter is forced to watch as the Burrowers surface and eat Parcher alive. Coffey manages to free himself and finds that the creatures who fed on Parcher have been affected by paralysis, a side effect of the drink that he was force fed. After staking the paralyzed burrowers to the ground to keep them from fleeing, Coffey sees that the rising sun is fatal to them.

Bringing the injured surviving Ute to Faith and Callaghan, Coffey rides back to find a doctor to save the Ute's life so they can learn the secret to defeating the Burrowers. He is instead found by Victor's military convoy, and when he returns, finds that they've hanged Faith and the Ute, and that Callaghan has died after getting his injured leg amputated. Coffey listens in shock as Victor blames and vows to take revenge on the Natives. Meanwhile, the Burrowers begin to feast on a still alive Spacks.

== Cast ==
- William Mapother as William Parcher
- Doug Hutchison as Henry Victor
- Karl Geary as Fergus Coffey
- Laura Leighton as Gertrude Spacks
- Sean Patrick Thomas as Walnut Callaghan
- Clancy Brown as John Clay
- Alexandra Edmo as Faith
- Tatanka Means as Tall Ute
- Anthony Parker as Ten Bear
- Galen Hutchison as Dobie Spacks
- David Mindhunter as Dull Knife
- Jocelin Donahue as Maryanne Stewart

== Release ==
The Burrowers was first screened at the Toronto International Film Festival on September 9, 2008.

=== Home media ===
The film was released on DVD by Lionsgate and Maple Pictures in the United States and Canada respectively on April 21, 2009.

== Critical response ==
The Burrowers received mostly positive reviews upon its release, with critics praising the film's blending of horror and western genres, cinematography, and character development. On review aggregator Rotten Tomatoes, the film holds an approval rating of 75%, based on 12 reviews, and an average rating of 6.02/10.

Karina Longworth of IndieWire praised the cinematography and screenplay, noting that the film "plays less like a horror film than a Terrence Malick film, with a mythological MacGuffin designed to reveal dark truths about the men forced to deal with it." Adrian Halen from HorrorNews.net offered the film similar praise, while noting that the film was more focused on its characters rather than its title antagonists.

== See also ==
- Weird West
- Tremors 4: The Legend Begins
- Native American
