= The Scene (play) =

The Scene is a black comedy written by Theresa Rebeck which was first performed in 2006.

== Plot summary ==
The play opens with a Manhattan party, where Clea, an attractive twenty-something Ohio native, is conversing with two men, Charlie, a middle-aged washed up actor, and Lewis, his best friend. Clea chatters (in her valley girl-esqe way of speaking) on about how "surreal" New York City is - advertising herself as the gorgeous but dumb girl. She rambles about how she doesn't drink, due to genetic alcoholism, but later accepts Lewis's vodka offer. After drinking down the vodka, Clea goes into a rant about this new job she took is absolutely empty, referring to it as a void. She also rants about her boss, Stella, calling her an infertile "Nazi Priestess" who is obsessed with her job and her current baby adoption process. It is revealed that Stella is Charlie's wife.

Stella, Charlie, and Lewis are drinking at Stella and Charlie's apartment, listening to Stella's rant about Clea, calling her an idiot who can barely speak English but looks good from the back. Lewis is sent out to get drinks and Stella complains about how miserable she is at work. Charlie then goes on a rant about the party. Stella asks Charlie if he spoke to Nick, Charlie's arch-nemesis. Nick and Charlie went to high school together

Clea first dates Lewis, soon moving to Charlie. His wife catches them in the act, and Charlie is unable to clear the situation. He loses his wife – Lewis is happy to console her – Clea drops him and moves on, and all he has left is his bottle and his misery.

== Productions ==
The world premiere of the play was in March to April 2006 at the Humana Festival of New American Plays at the Actors Theatre of Louisville, directed by Rebecca Taichman.

The play subsequently was produced Off-Broadway at the Second Stage Theatre from December 12, 2006 in previews until February 11, 2007. The Off-Broadway production was also directed by Taichman.

== Critical response ==
It was well received by The New York Times reviewer, who wrote that it was a "sharp-witted, sharp-elbowed comedy about the savage economies of sex and show business in contemporary Manhattan."

The Hollywood Reporter found that "Rebeck fails to lay the groundwork for Charlie's second-act disintegration."

The CurtainUp reviewer wrote that the play was "sharply written" and "Ms. [Rebecca] Taichman is again in charge for the very handsomely staged Second Stage production....an entertaining sendup of our celebrity conscious culture."

== Cast ==
Off-Broadway Cast:

- Clea – Anna Camp
- Stella – Patricia Heaton
- Charlie – Tony Shalhoub
- Lewis – Christopher Evan Welch

World Premiere Cast:

- Clea – Anna Camp
- Stella – Carla Harting
- Charlie – Stephen Barker Turner
- Lewis – David Wilson Barnes
