= Michael Burns (executive) =

American entertainment executive and Vice Chairman of Lionsgate

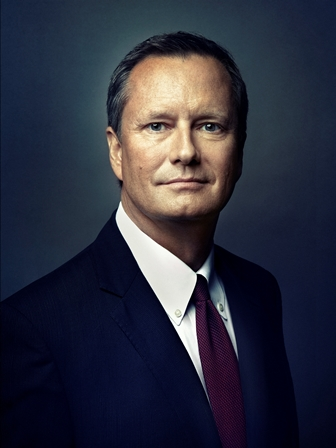
- Burns in 2014
- Born: August 21, 1958 (age 68); Long Branch, New Jersey, U.S.
- Education: Arizona State University (B.S.); University of California, Los Angeles (M.B.A.)
- Occupation: Vice Chairman (2000–present)
- Employer: Lionsgate (1999–present)
- Spouses: Lori Loughlin (m. 1989; div. 1996) Pell James (m. 2006; div. 2025)

Michael Burns (born August 21, 1958) is an American entertainment executive who joined the board of directors of Lionsgate in 1999 and became Vice Chairman of Lionsgate in March 2000, a position he continues to hold. During his 27-year tenure, Lionsgate has grown from a fledgling independent studio into a diversified global entertainment company. In May 2025, Lionsgate’s studio business and STARZ streaming business separated into two independent, publicly-traded companies, Lionsgate and STARZ, and Mr. Burns became non-Executive Chairman of STARZ’s Board of Directors while remaining Vice Chairman of Lionsgate.

== Early life ==
Burns was born into an Irish-American Roman Catholic family in Long Branch, New Jersey, on August 21, 1958. His father was an advertising executive and World War II combat veteran who landed on Iwo Jima. His family moved to New Canaan, Connecticut, where he was raised. He later attended Arizona State University, graduating with a B.S. degree in 1980. He earned his M.B.A. from the University of California, Los Angeles in 1992.

== Career ==
Burns began his career as a sales representative for IBM, where he won recognition as a performance leader. Mr. Burns served as Managing Director and Head of the Office at Prudential Securities Inc.'s Los Angeles Investment Banking Office from 1991 to March 2000. He subsequently served for 18 years as a Wall Street executive, joining Shearson/American Express in 1985, where he first became acquainted with Jamie Dimon (the firm became Shearson Lehman Bros. in 1990).

He was named to a series of progressively responsible executive positions during his nine-year tenure at Shearson, becoming a vice president at the age of 26 and a senior vice president at 29. He then joined Prudential Securities as a managing director at the age of 32, serving as head of Prudential's Los Angeles investment banking office, where he specialized in raising equity within the media and entertainment industry.

Burns was recruited to join the Board of Directors of Lionsgate, an independent studio known for art house successes such as Gods and Monsters, Affliction and The Red Violin, in 1999. He and Feltheimer, a former Sony Pictures and New World Entertainment executive, orchestrated a $33 million preferred equity financing in December 1999.

Following the recapitalization, Feltheimer and Burns formally joined Lionsgate as Chief Executive Officer and Vice Chairman, respectively.

Lionsgate soon generated a string of independent hits such as Monster's Ball, which earned a Best Actress Academy Award for Halle Berry in 2002, Fahrenheit 9/11, the highest-grossing documentary film of all time, Crash, which won three Oscars, including Best Picture, in 2006, and Saw, acquired for $1 million from 90 seconds of video and a script, which went on to become one of the highest-grossing horror franchises of all time, generating $860 million at the worldwide box office as well as La La Land and the Hunger Games and John Wick franchisees.

As Lionsgate continued to grow, it listed on the New York Stock Exchange in August 2004 and diversified into television production and distribution as well as investments in branded channels. The company grew and diversified, acquiring Trimark Holdings (2000), Artisan Entertainment (2003), Redbus Film Distributors, subsequently renamed Lionsgate UK (2005), the Debmar-Mercury television syndication company (2006), TV Guide Network (2009) and Summit Entertainment (2012). In December 2016, Lionsgate acquired the premium pay television platform Starz for $4.4 billion, the largest acquisition in the Company's history.

Lionsgate films and franchises have collectively grossed billions of dollars at the worldwide box office, and has produced ground-breaking television series such as Orange is the New Black, Nashville, Love Life, Ghosts, Mythic Quest, Power, Minx, P-Valley and the iconic Mad Men, which won four consecutive Best Drama Emmys.

The Company also has a location-based entertainment business that includes theme park attractions, rides and exhibitions currently operating or planned in the U.S., UK, Europe, the Middle East and China, and in addition operates the Atom Tickets in partnership with Disney and Fox.

In a January 2014 story, "A Star is Born", chronicling Lionsgate's rise, The Economist proclaimed that "Hollywood has a new star studio with a different approach to the film business", reporting "Lionsgate has achieved a level of success no one predicted."

== Other ==
Burns was a co-founder and chairman of Novica.com and a co-founder of the Hollywood Stock Exchange. A moderate Republican, he is a contributing writer for The Huffington Post and Newsmax.

He is a member of the Academy of Motion Picture Arts & Sciences and the UCLA Anderson board of visitors. On December 11, 2014, he was elected as an independent director to the Board of Directors of Hasbro, Inc.

He also serves on the leadership council of global first responder International Medical Corps. In March 2017 he was named Alumni of the Year by Arizona State University.

== Personal life ==
In 1989, Burns married Full House actress Lori Loughlin, and they divorced in 1996. They have no children together. Burns married actress Pell James in June 2006 and they divorced in 2025. They have three sons. Burns also has a daughter with his current longtime partner and filmmaker, Annabelle Dunne.
