= Theresa Rebeck =

American dramatist

- Born: February 19, 1958 (age 68); Kenwood, Ohio, U.S.
- Education: University of Notre Dame (BA); Brandeis University (MA, MFA, PhD)
- Occupations: Playwright; writer; novelist
- Spouse: Jess Lynn
- Children: 2

Theresa Rebeck (born February 19, 1958) is an American playwright, television writer, and novelist. Her work has appeared on the Broadway and Off-Broadway stage, in film, and on television. Among her awards are the Mystery Writers of America's Edgar Award. In 2012, she received the Athena Film Festival Award for Excellence as a Playwright and Author of Films, Books, and Television. She is a 2009 recipient of the Alex Awards. Her works have influenced American playwrights by bringing a feminist edge in her old works.

== Early life and education ==
Rebeck was born in Kenwood, Ohio, and graduated from Cincinnati's Ursuline Academy in 1976. She earned her undergraduate degree at the University of Notre Dame in 1980, and followed that with three degrees from Brandeis University: an MA in English 1983, a MFA in Playwriting in 1986, and a PhD in Victorian era melodrama, awarded in 1989.

== Career ==
Past New York productions of her work include Mauritius on Broadway at the Biltmore Theatre in a Manhattan Theater Club production; The Scene, The Water's Edge, Loose Knit, The Family of Mann and Spike Heels at Second Stage Theatre; Bad Dates and The Butterfly Collection at Playwrights Horizons; and View of the Dome at New York Theatre Workshop. Omnium Gatherum (co-written, finalist for the Pulitzer Prize for Drama in 2003) was featured at the Humana Festival, and had a commercial run at the Variety Arts Theatre in 2003. Her play The Understudy, premiered at the Williamstown Theatre Festival in the summer of 2008, with a cast including Reg Rogers, Bradley Cooper and Kristen Johnson, and ran in New York at the Roundabout Theatre from October 2009 – January 2010, featuring Julie White, Justin Kirk, and Mark-Paul Gosselaar in the cast. The off-Broadway and regional theatre hit comedy premiered in 2015 at Artists Repertory Theatre in Portland. Rebeck was attached as a book writer for the new musical Ever After, based on the Drew Barrymore movie of the same name. That show was expected to start pre-Broadway tryouts in San Francisco in April 2009, but was postponed. Her play, Mauritius, ran at the Pasadena Playhouse in California from March 27 through April 26, 2009.

Her play Seminar played on Broadway starting in October 2011, and starred Alan Rickman. In May 2014 Seminar premiered in San Francisco at San Francisco Playhouse receiving outstanding reviews. Her play Fool premiered at the Alley Theatre, Houston, Texas, in February 2014. The theme of the play Seminar was women empowerment through sexuality and the struggles of what it is to be a female in an industry dominated by men.

Her play Poor Behavior opened Off-Broadway at Primary Stages in August 2014. The play premiered at the Mark Taper Forum in 2011.

In an article in The New York Times in September 2007, she said that her plays were about "betrayal and treason and poor behavior. A lot of poor behavior." Rebeck's other publications include Free Fire Zone, a book of comedic essays about writing and show business. She has written for American Theatre magazine and has had excerpts of her plays published in the Harvard Review. Rebeck's first novel, Three Girls and Their Brother, was published in 2008 by Random House/Shaye Areheart Books.

She has received awards including the Mystery Writers of America's Edgar Award, the Writers Guild of America Award for Episodic Drama, the Hispanic Images Imagen Award, and the Peabody Award, all for her work on NYPD Blue. She has won the National Theatre Conference Award (for The Family of Mann), and was awarded the William Inge New Voices Playwriting Award in 2003 for The Bells. Mauritius was originally produced at Boston's Huntington Theatre, where it received the 2007 IRNE Award for Best New Play as well as the Elliot Norton Award. In 2010, Rebeck was honored with the PEN/Laura Pels International Foundation for Theater Award for an American playwright in mid-career.

In television, Rebeck has written for Dream On, Brooklyn Bridge, L.A. Law, American Dreamer, Maximum Bob, First Wave, and Third Watch. She has been a writer/producer for Canterbury's Law, Smith, Law & Order: Criminal Intent and NYPD Blue. Through March 2012 she was one of the executive producers for the NBC musical series Smash, which she created, and which also debuted on February 6, 2012. Her produced feature film screenplays include Harriet the Spy, Gossip, and the independent feature Sunday on the Rocks.

== Academic ==
Rebeck is a board member of The Dramatists Guild and the Lark Play Development Center in New York City, and has taught at Brandeis University and Columbia University. From 2014 through 2023 she was a Distinguished Professor of Playwriting and the Lyndall Finley Wortham Chair in the Performing Arts in the McGovern College of the Arts at the University of Houston.

== Personal life ==
Rebeck is married, residing with her husband, Jess Lynn, and two children, Cooper and Cleo, in Park Slope, Brooklyn. Three Girls and their Brother is dedicated to both Cooper and Cleo.

== Works ==
=== Theatre ===
Her other work as a playwright includes:

Year	Title	Venue	Notes	Ref.
2003	Omnium Gatherum	Humana Festival; world premiere	With Alexandra Gersten-Vassilaros	
2007	Mauritius	Biltmore Theatre, Broadway		
2007	The Understudy	Williamstown Theatre Festival; world premiere		
2011	O Beautiful	University of Delaware		
2011	Poor Behavior	Mark Taper Forum; world premiere		
2011	What We're Up Against	Magic Theatre, San Francisco		
2011	Seminar	John Golden Theatre, Broadway		
2012	Dead Accounts	Music Box Theatre, Broadway		
2016	The Nest	Denver Center Theatre Company		
2016	Seared	San Francisco Playhouse; world premiere		
2018	Bernhardt/Hamlet	American Airlines Theatre, Broadway		
2019	Dig	Dorset Playhouse; world premiere		
2022	Mad House	Ambassadors Theatre, West End		
2023	I Need That	American Airlines Theatre, Broadway		

=== Television ===
Year	Title	Director	Writer	Producer	Notes	Ref.
1990–1991	American Dreamer	No	Yes	No		
1992–1994	L.A. Law	No	Yes	No	2 episodes	
1991–1992	Dream On	No	Yes	No	4 episodes	
1991–1992	Brooklyn Bridge	No	Yes	No	2 episodes	
1997	Total Security	No	Yes	No	Also Creator; 2 episodes	
1998	Maximum Bob	No	Yes	Executive	Episode: "Bay of Big's"	
2000	Third Watch	No	Yes	No	Episode: "Demolition Derby"	
2001–2003	Law & Order: Criminal Intent	No	Yes	Executive	41 episodes	
2007–2008	Law & Order: Criminal Mind	No	Yes	Yes	4 episodes	
2007	Smith	No	Yes	Consulting	Episode: "Six"	
2008	Canterbury's Law	No	Yes	Executive	5 episodes	
2012–2013	Smash	No	Yes	Executive	Also Creator; 32 episodes	
2013	Copper	No	Yes	No	Episode: "Think Gently of the Erring"	
2014	The Divide	No	Yes	No	Episode: "I Can't Go Back"	
2015	Hand of God	No	Yes	No	Episode: "A Flower That Bees Prefer"	
2016	Of Kings and Prophets	No	Yes	No	2 episodes	
2018	The Russian Cousin	Yes	No	No	Television Movie	
2020	For the Record	Yes	No	No	Episode: "Autumn Elegy"	

=== Film ===
Year	Title	Director	Writer	Producer	Notes	Ref.
1995	Harriet the Spy	No	Yes	No		
2000	Gossip	No	Yes	No		
2004	Catwoman	No	Yes	No	Story by	
2004	Sunday on the Rocks	No	Yes	No		
2010	Seducing Charlie Barker	No	Yes	No	Based on her play The Scene	
2016	Poor Behavior	Yes	Yes	No		
2016	Walk	No	Yes	No	Short film	
2017	Trouble	Yes	Yes	Yes		
2019	Date	No	Yes	Yes	Short film	
2022	Spike Heels	No	Yes	No	Short film	
2022	The 355	No	Yes	No		
2022	Glimpse	Yes	Yes	No		
2024	Eco Village	No	No	Yes		

== Awards and nominations ==
Year	Association	Category	Project	Result	Ref.
1996	Edgar Award	Best Television Episode	NYPD Blue (episode: "Torah! Torah! Torah!")	Won	
1996	Primetime Emmy Award	Outstanding Drama Series	NYPD Blue (season three)	Nominated	
1997	Primetime Emmy Award	Outstanding Drama Series	NYPD Blue (season four)	Nominated	
1997	Writers Guild of America	Episodic Drama	NYPD Blue (episode: "Girl Talk")	Won	
2005	Razzie Award	Worst Screenplay	Catwoman	Won	
2020	Drama League Award	Outstanding Production of a Play	Seared	Nominated	
2024	Outer Critics Circle Award	Outstanding New Off-Broadway Play	Dig	Nominated	

== Bibliography ==
=== Fiction ===
- I'm Glad About You (2016)
- Twelve Rooms with a View (2011)
- Three Girls and Their Brother: A Novel by Theresa Rebeck (2009)

=== Non-fiction ===
- "Free Fire Zone: A Playwright's Adventures on the Creative Battlefields of Film, TV, and Theater" (2007)

Volumes

- Rebeck, Theresa (1999), Theresa Rebeck: Complete Plays Volume I, 1989 – 1998 (1st ed.), Smith & Kraus, ISBN 1-57525-172-8
- Rebeck, Theresa (2007), Theresa Rebeck: Complete Plays Volume II 1999 - 2007 (1st ed.), Smith & Kraus, ISBN 978-1-57525-444-9
- Rebeck, Theresa (2007), Theresa Rebeck: Complete Plays Volume III Short Plays 1989 - 2005 (1st ed.), Smith & Kraus, ISBN 978-1-57525-447-0
