= Ben Rock =

American film director

Ben Rock is an American film and theatre director, based in Los Angeles. Rock's career was launched when he served as production designer on The Blair Witch Project made by fellow University of Central Florida graduates Daniel Myrick, Eduardo Sanchez, Gregg Hale, Robin Cowie and Michael Monello. Rock created the infamous "stick man" symbol that became synonymous with the hit film.

== Biography ==
Following the success of Blair Witch, Rock wrote three and directed two television specials in the mocumentary format, Curse of the Blair Witch (for which Rock served as writer), and The Burkittsville 7 and Shadow of the Blair Witch, which Rock wrote, produced, and directed promoting the release of the sequel, Book of Shadows: Blair Witch 2 that many deemed better than the film itself. For over a year, Rock served as consultant on all the tie-in books and games for the Blair Witch franchise, which included The Blair Witch Files series of books.

He frequently directs TV or viral internet projects that are considered "Branded Content" or are somehow a part of marketing, including The B.P.R.D. Declassified, a marketing project for the Hellboy movie that aired on FX Networks and a series of short action films for Audi's online campaign The Art of the Heist, a series of viral internet videos for The 4400 and True Blood.

Rock's first feature film as a director, Alien Raiders, was released by Warner Home Video and Raw Feed in February 2009. The film stars Carlos Bernard, Rockmond Dunbar, and Mathew St. Patrick and is produced by Daniel Myrick, John Shiban and Tony Krantz.

He is also the director of the award-winning short films The Perfect Candidate by frequent collaborator Jenelle Riley, The Meeting, Hate of Date, and Conversations, starring Curtis Armstrong.

Rock worked as a makeup artist (special effects and regular) before pursuing directing. During this time, he worked with Catherine Keener, Brigitte Nielsen, Sandahl Bergman, Charles Napier, and Leo Rossi.

He often participates in Instant Films, a 48-hour filmmaking challenge.

He worked as a projectionist for the Florida Film Festival and the Enzian Theater from 1996 to 1999, before relocating to Los Angeles.

Rock was also an associate editor for the independent filmmaking magazine Action and a contributing writer at Backstage and Creative Screenwriting magazines. In 2010, he returned to theater to direct Baal, the very first play written by famed playwright Bertolt Brecht, and again in 2012 to direct William Shakespeare's Richard III. Both plays were produced at Los Angeles' Sacred Fools Theater Company, where Rock is a member.

== Awards ==
Meeting Mr. Subian- Audience Award, Central Florida Film and Video Festival, 1995

1996 CFFVF Trailer - Golden Addy, 1996

1997 CFFVF Trailer - Silver Addy, 1997

Hate or Date - Audience Award at Instant Films for Best Film, Director, Cinematographer, Editor, Script and Cast

Conversations - Best short and Best Actor (Curtis Armstrong) at Shockerfest, DIY Award at Hypefest, Finalist Award at GenArts Shorts in the Park, Cinematography award at Just Another Film Festival

New Orleans Chapter of The Art of the Heist - Bronze award at The One Show

== Personal life ==
He is the son of former Orlando and Miami area Bozo the Clown Alan Rock. Attended Winter Park High School with comedian Billy Gardell and screenwriter Darren Fischbach. Rock is married to HGTV producer Alicia Conway, and they frequently collaborate on creative projects including Conversations and Hate or Date.
