= Alien Raiders =

- Directed by: Ben Rock
- Screenplay by: Julia Fair
- Story by: David Simkins
- Produced by: Steve Ecclesine; Tony Krantz; Daniel Myrick; John Shiban
- Starring: Carlos Bernard; Mathew St. Patrick; Courtney Ford; Jeffrey Licon; Samantha Streets; Derek Basco; Bonita Friedericy; Bryan Krasner; Rockmond Dunbar
- Cinematography: Walt Lloyd
- Music by: Kays Al-Atrakchi
- Production company: Raw Feed
- Distributed by: Warner Home Video
- Release date: September 21, 2008 (Fantastic Fest)
- Running time: 85 minutes
- Country: United States
- Language: English

Alien Raiders is a 2008 American science fiction horror film, starring Carlos Bernard, Rockmond Dunbar and Mathew St. Patrick. The film is Ben Rock's first feature film as a director. The film was produced by Daniel Myrick, John Shiban, and Tony Krantz.

== Plot ==
Just as the local grocery store is about to close, a group of six armed, masked people enter the building. They take the staff and remaining customers hostage and immediately shoot down one of the employees. One of the masked men named Spooky is then told to check whether "he" is among the hostages. When he identifies a woman as one of "them", she tries to escape but is shot down. Meanwhile, a police officer, who was also inside the store, manages to kill one of the masked men. He then calls for back-up and shoots Spooky, who hasn't managed to check all hostages yet. The cop is then killed too.

As the police arrive, the group argues whether or not to leave, but their leader, a man named Ritter, tells them that they need to finish their job. They release the hostages Spooky already managed to clear and move the rest to the back of the store. As they inspect one of the corpses, it becomes clear that the person was infected with an organism that breeds inside the person. With Spooky dead, the group resorts to a different method for checking whether the rest of the people are infected or not. One by one, the hostages are taken to another room and have one of their fingers cut off, which Sterling, the doctor of the group, uses to verify if they are infected or not.

Outside the store a policeman named Seth, whose stepdaughter Whitney works as a cashier at the store, takes charge of the police operation. They discover that Ritter used to work as a rocket scientist and that the group hunts people that are infected with an alien parasite that came to Earth inside a meteorite, which the cops don't believe. Trying to negotiate with Ritter, they come to the agreement that Ritter will release one of the hostages if the police bring them a woman named Charlotte, who used to be part of the group and possesses the same ability as Spooky did.

The group inside discovers another woman is infected and kill her. They are then attacked by the revived body of the cop, who manages to kill two of the captors and three of the hostages. Ritter then explains to the remaining hostages what they were after: The parasites are divided in two groups, several females and one king. Without the king, the parasites would eventually go extinct. They knew that one of the persons inside the store was the host of the king, which is why they took the whole store hostage.

Seth and Charlotte then come inside. With Charlotte's help, the group lures the infected cop into a trap, while Seth leads his stepdaughter and the store clerk named Benny, who volunteered to have his finger cut off to spare Whitney the ordeal, outside. Ritter manages to cut the living parasite out of the cop, but is subsequently gunned down by the police who try to kill it. Just as Sterling is arrested by Seth, Charlotte realizes that the killed parasite was not the king. Inside a police car, Benny overhears Seth calling the other cops, telling them that Benny must be the king. Benny realizes that it must actually be Whitney, since she was the only one who is still alive and wasn't checked by the captors. As he aims a gun at her, her eyes and veins change to a darker color and the screen fades to black, while Benny is heard screaming.

== Cast ==
- Carlos Bernard as Aaron Ritter
- Mathew St. Patrick as Seth Steadman
- Rockmond Dunbar as Kane
- Courtney Ford as Sterling
- Jeffrey Licon as Benny
- Samantha Streets as Whitney
- Derek Basco as Manny
- Bonita Friedericy as Charlotte
- Bryan Krasner as Moody
- Keith Hudson as Chambers
- Joel McCrary as Tarkey
- Joseph Steven Yang as Ulrich
- Philip Newby as Spooky
- Tom Kiesche as Logan
- Andrew Ableson as Cop
- Travis Guba as Phoenix Cop
- Tom Noga as Teacher
- Kathleen Parker as Mother
- McKay Stewart as Walker
- Mark Anthony Vazquez as Walker
- Roberta Bassin as Boozy Woman/Marcy

== Release ==
The film featured only at 2008 Fantastic Fest (September 18–25, 2008) on September 21, 2008, as part of that festivals' "Texas Premieres". It was released directly to DVD by Warner Home Video under the Raw Feed label in September 2008.

== Reception ==
The film holds a 100% approval rating on Rotten Tomatoes, based on six reviews with an average score of 7.21/10. Critics highlighted the unexpectedly high quality effects and acting, which exceeded expectations of a low-budget horror film. The bulk of criticism was aimed at the film's title, which Steve Barton of Dread Central dubbed "ridiculous" while praising the film itself as worthy of a theatrical release.
