= Price of gold =

Price of gold may refer to:

- Price of gold, using gold as an investment
- "The Price of Gold", a 2011 episode of the fairy tale/drama television series Once Upon a Time.
- The Price of Gold, a 2014 sports film documentary that is part of the 30 for 30 series.
