= Sublime (2007 film) =

- DVD cover
- Directed by: Tony Krantz
- Written by: Erik Jendresen
- Produced by: Tony Krantz; Daniel Myrick; John Shiban; Shawn Papazian
- Starring: Tom Cavanagh; Kathleen York; Lawrence Hilton-Jacobs; Katherine Cunningham-Eves
- Cinematography: Dermott Downs
- Edited by: Robert Florio
- Music by: Peter Golub
- Production company: Raw Feed
- Distributed by: Warner Home Video
- Release date: March 13, 2007
- Running time: 113 minutes
- Country: United States
- Language: English

Sublime is a 2007 psychological horror film directed by Tony Krantz and written by Erik Jendresen. It is the second straight-to-DVD "Raw Feed" horror film from Warner Home Video, released on March 13, 2007. The film stars Tom Cavanagh, Kathleen York, Lawrence Hilton-Jacobs and Katherine Cunningham-Eves.

== Plot ==
George Grieves checks into the Mt. Abaddon Hospital for a routine procedure only to find horrors await him. Awakening from what was supposedly a colonoscopy, Grieves is told by hospital staff that due to confusion arising from similar patient names he was mistakenly given a sympathectomy to cure sweaty palms.

As the days tick by Mr. Grieves' post-operative experiences grow ever more bizarre until he finally realizes that he is caught inside a nightmare of his own creation and seems unable to escape or awaken back in the real world. He understands that something has gone wrong in his post-operative recovery which is keeping him trapped in this netherworld of manifestations of worst fears, but he understands neither what the problem is nor what he can do to awaken from it.

Eventually his condition is shown from his family's perspective, and it appears hopeless. The doctors explain that there was a complication during the colonoscopy, which created an air bubble in his bloodstream. The bubble eventually reached his brain and caused so much damage that he ended up in an apparently permanent vegetative state. He has been dead to the outside world for 10 months, and his family is being pressured to end all artificial means of life support.

Meanwhile, back inside his own mind, Grieves is in a desperate losing battle with his own manifested fears and decides that the only way out is to commit suicide in this dream-like state, hoping that it will cause his real body to expire and free him from the interminable torment he has had to endure. He manages to leap from a 7th-floor window onto the concrete below, and the final shot is of his real-world body lying in an empty hospital room where it flatlines, closing its eyelids in physical death.

== Cast ==
- Tom Cavanagh as George Grieves
- Kathleen York as Jenny
- Katherine Cunningham-Eves as Zoe
- Jeffrey Anderson-Gunter as P.J.
- Cas Anvar as Dr. Sharazi
- Paget Brewster as Andrea
- David Clayton Rogers as Billy
- Jordi Caballero as Friar Lazaro Mate
- Sujata Day as Young Quechua Girl
- Lilyan Chauvin as European Nurse
- Shanna Collins as Chloe
- Kyle Gallner as Ned
- Dan Gerrity as The Bald Man
- Michael Gregory as The Face
- Lawrence Hilton-Jacobs as Mandingo
- George Newbern as Frank / PVS Host
- Bruce Nozick as Ira
- Michelle Page as Rayven
- Carolyn Hennesy as Cheryl

== Production ==
In June 2006, it was announced Tony Krantz, of the TV series 24 would make his directorial debut on Sublime the second film to be produced under Warner Bros. Home Entertainment label Raw Feed that Krantz had created with Daniel Myrick and John Shiban. The film's budget was estimated at around $5 million.

== Reception ==
The film garnered a 33% approval rating from 6 critics – a mixed to negative rating of 4.1 out of 10 – on the review-aggregate website Rotten Tomatoes.
