= Edmund Entin =

American actor

Edmund Entin (born December 10, 1985) is an American actor. He is known for his role as Robin Stanton in The Seeker: The Dark is Rising and as Jonah in the After Dark Originals film Seconds Apart.

== Biography ==
Edmund was born in Miami, Florida, the twin brother of Gary Entin. He grew up in Pembroke Pines, Florida, where he started his acting career with the Pembroke Pines Theater of the Performing Arts. Among his prior roles was Eugene in the PPTOPA production of Neil Simon's Brighton Beach Memoirs. He also starred in productions at Main Street Players in Miami Lakes including You're A Good Man Charlie Brown and Lost in Yonkers.

In "Uncle Michael"'s garden, in Southwest Ranches, Florida, Edmund and his brother Gary started their filming careers. They would write plots, pick out their cast from the neighborhood kids, and film movies. Currently, Edmund is living with his brother in California pursuing their dreams of becoming movie stars.

Entin is Jewish.

== Filmography ==
=== as an Actor ===
Year	Title	Role/Position	Notes
2006	Rest Stop	Twin #2	a.k.a. Rest Stop: Dead Ahead (Australia: DVD title)
2007	Color Me Olsen	Ashley/Taylor	
2007	The Seeker: The Dark is Rising	Paul Stanton	
2008	Rest Stop: Don't Look Back	Twin #2	
2008	Whore	Edmund	
2008	Prep School	Owen	
2010	Brothers of the Blood	Peter	pre-production
2011	Seconds Apart	Jonah	

=== as Producer ===
Year	Title	Position	Notes
2007	Color Me Olsen	producer	
