= Seconds Apart =

- Theatrical film poster
- Directed by: Antonio Negret
- Screenplay by: George Richards
- Produced by: Courtney Solomon; Moshe Diamant
- Starring: Orlando Jones; Edmund Entin; Gary Entin
- Cinematography: Yaron Levy
- Edited by: William Leh
- Music by: Lior Rosner
- Production companies: After Dark Films; Signature Pictures
- Distributed by: After Dark Films
- Release date: January 28, 2011
- Running time: 88 minutes
- Country: United States
- Language: English
- Box office: $1,137 (UK)

Seconds Apart is a 2011 American horror film directed by Antonio Negret and starring Orlando Jones, Edmund Entin, and Gary Entin.

== Plot ==
Four friends are seen at a high school house party drinking and gossiping in a private room. Their fun is cut short when a pair of identical twin brothers - classmates of the friends - enter the room with a video camera. The twins force the friends to play Russian roulette, the game ending only when all four friends are dead. The next day, Detective Lampkin launches an investigation. He interviews classmates of the dead boys, and one student named Katie mentions having seen the twins, Jonah and Seth Trimble, at the party. It is revealed that the twins had once forced Katie to have sex with another boy on camera. Lampkin summons the twins for interrogation, but they maintain their innocence. It is also revealed that Lampkin is a haunted man, traumatized by his inability to save his beloved wife from a house fire.

The twins torture their Headmaster for the name of the person who told Lampkin that they were at the party; they eventually force their Headmaster through telepathy to stab himself to death, after making him painfully pull out an artery. They then force Katie to kill herself as well, and then a pedophile whom they meet at a park. Lampkin deduces that the twins possess telepathic powers, and in his search for a cause, he learns that their mother had submitted herself to experimentation at a fertility clinic in order to get pregnant with the twins.

Meanwhile, Jonah falls in love with another student named Eve. As Jonah grows closer to Eve, he pulls away from Seth, finally telling Seth that he wants nothing more to do with the mysterious "project" that they have been conducting. In anger, Seth impersonates Jonah and has sex with Eve to "prove" that Eve cannot tell them apart and therefore must not really be in love with Jonah. The twins brawl at school. Jonah goes home, only to be confronted by Lampkin. Seth returns home shortly after, and it is suddenly revealed that their parents are disfigured and their house is in ruins; as children, the twins forced their parents, who had become suspicious of the twins, to stab each other in the face. Although he had been compliant until now in their charades, Jonah decides that he no longer wants to force people to hurt themselves. After knocking out Lampkin, Seth attacks Jonah and sets the house on fire.

Eve shows up to the house and tries to intervene by shooting Seth in the leg. She flees upstairs, but Seth follows and chokes her. Jonah rescues Eve; as Jonah and Seth struggle, the burning floor gives way and the twins fall through onto the dining room table. Lampkin wakes up and saves Eve from the fire; although he dies from his burns, it is insinuated that Lampkin has redeemed himself for the death of his wife.

The twins lie paralyzed on the dining room table as the house burns around them. Understanding that they will die, the twins finally experience fear for the first time - the ultimate goal of their "project".

== Cast ==
- Orlando Jones as Detective Lampkin
- Edmund Entin as Jonah Trimble
- Gary Entin as Seth Trimble
- Samantha Droke as Eve
- Louis Herthum as Owen Trimble
- Morgana Shaw as Rita Trimble
- Marc Macaulay as Father Zinselmeyer
- James DuMont as Hardesty
- Jenn Foreman as Katie Dunn
- David Jensen as Dr. Houska
- Leticia Jimenez as Maybel
- Rusty Tennant as Kirby
- Chelsea Morgan Thomas as Emily

== Production ==
Director Anton Negret was brought in to direct the film after the company After Dark Films saw his earlier film, Towards Darkness. They sent him several scripts, one of which was Seconds Apart. Negret stated that the script was "original, fresh and I was surprised by how twisted it was." Twin actors Edmund and Gary Entin were hired to portray the movie's central characters, Jonah and Seth Trimble. Negret wanted to avoid having a single actor play both roles and was familiar with the Entins after seeing them in the Rest Stop movies. Orlando Jones was also brought in to portray Detective Lampkin.

== Reception ==
Dennis Harvey of Variety called it a jumbled film with "some visual panache". R. L. Shaffer of IGN declared it the best of the After Dark Originals DVD collection while noting "there's not much particularly original about this morbid tale, which plays like a Dean Koontz adaptation." as well as noting the film being derivative of David Cronenberg's Scanners. Patrick Douglas wrote in Great Falls Tribune that the film was "just different enough to stand out from the pack".
