= Carolyn Hennesy =

American actress (born 1962)

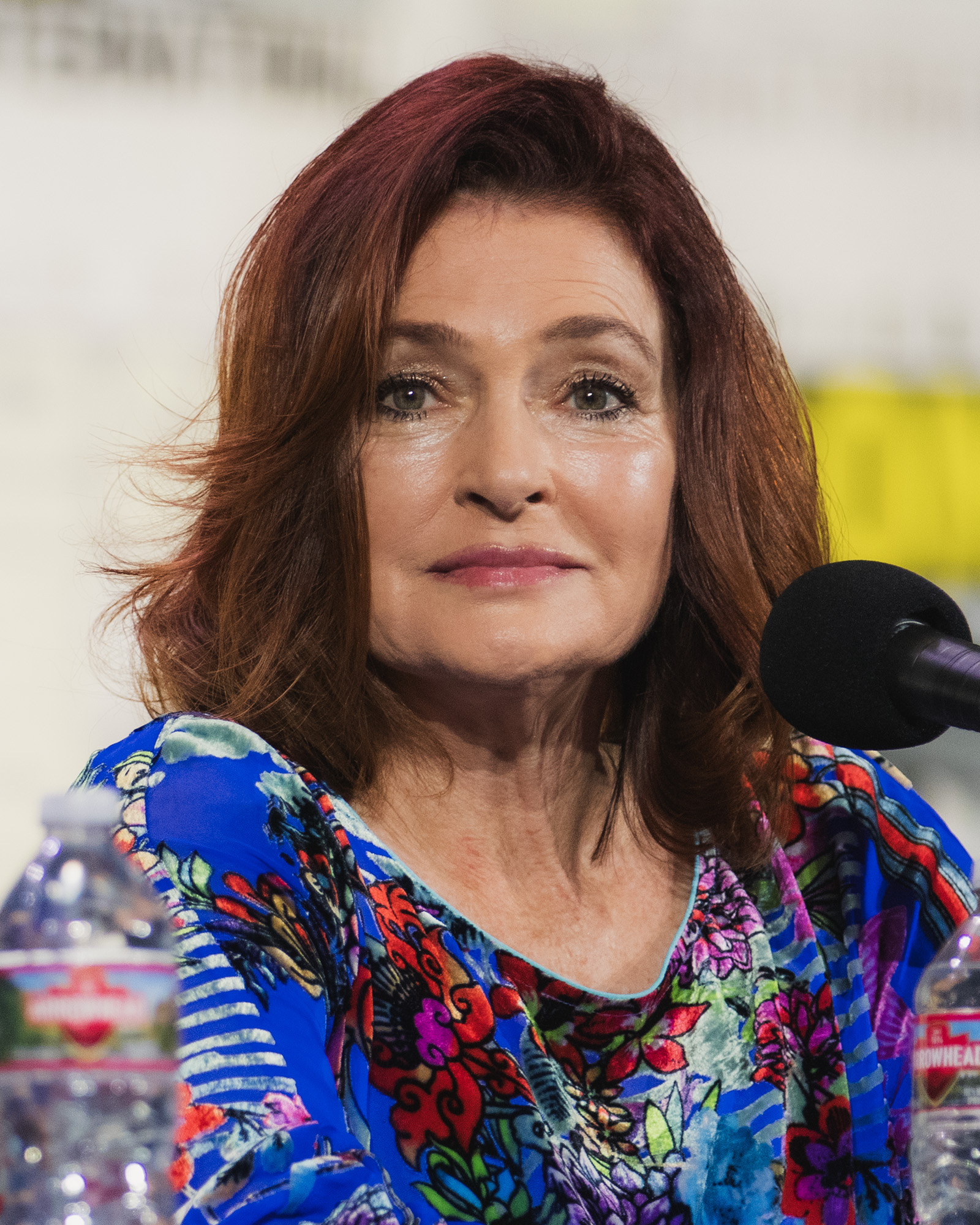
- Hennesy in 2026
- Born: June 10, 1962 (age 64); Encino, California, U.S.
- Occupations: Actress; writer; marine park and zoo advocate
- Years active: 1992–present
- Spouse: Donald Agnelli (m. 2007; div. 2013)
- Father: Dale Hennesy
- Relatives: Barbara Rush (aunt); Claudia Cowan (cousin)
- Website: carolynhennesy.com

Carolyn Hennesy (born June 10, 1962) is an American actress, writer, and animal advocate. Hennesy's early work consisted of guest appearances and roles in shows and television movies, including Dark Justice and in Deadly Invasion: The Killer Bee Nightmare. She rose to prominence when she was cast in a recurring role in Dawson's Creek. She followed this with a series of guest appearances until she gained international acclaim after landing the role of Diane Miller on the daytime television series General Hospital, for which she earned two Daytime Emmy Award nominations. Following this, she was cast in more recurring roles in shows such as Cougar Town, Revenge, and Jessie. She also received much credibility for her role in The Bay, for which she won her first Daytime Emmy Award.

Hennesy has also taken up writing, including with the 2011 novel The Secret Life of Damian Spinelli, featuring characters from General Hospital, which reached #16 on the New York Times Best Seller list. She is also known for her work as an advocate for animals, notable for her work promoting AZA zoos and aquariums, as well as promoting accredited marine parks like SeaWorld.

== Early life and education ==
Hennesy was born on June 10, 1962, in Encino, California. She is the daughter of production designer and art director Dale Hennesy, who won an Academy Award for Best Art Direction for the 1966 film Fantastic Voyage.

== Career ==
=== Acting ===
Hennesy starred as Mrs. Valentine on the teen drama Dawson's Creek in the 2000–2001 season, and she had supporting roles in the films Global Effect (2002), Terminator 3: Rise of the Machines (2003), Legally Blonde 2: Red, White and Blonde (2003), The Heat Chamber (2005), Click (2006), and Cougar Club (2007). She made three appearances on That '70s Show and has guest-starred on Reba as the mother of Reba's son-in-law, Van. She made a guest appearance on Drake & Josh as Mrs. Abernathy, the boss of the Ball & Vance Fish Corp. Additionally, she appeared as Judith Haven in an episode of What I Like About You. She starred as Rosalyn Harris in the fifth season of HBO hit series True Blood. In 2016, she joined the cast of the Netflix production Gilmore Girls: A Year in the Life.

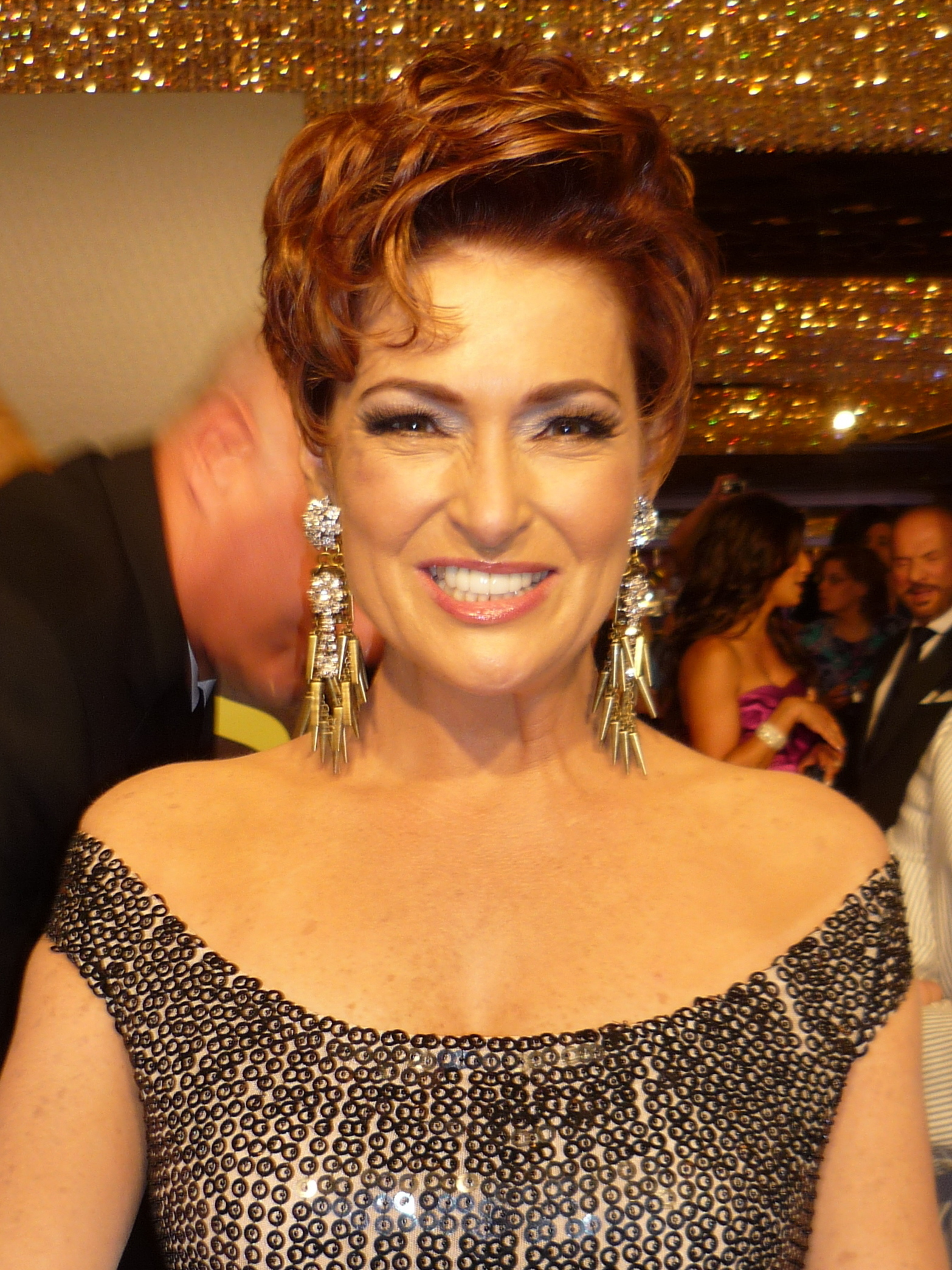
Hennesy at the 2010 Daytime Emmy Awards

Since 2006, Hennessy has played Diane Miller on the daytime soap opera General Hospital. She was nominated for a Daytime Emmy Award for the role in 2010. In October 2011, Hennesy appeared on Jessie as Mrs. Chesterfield, a role she would reprise through the series' entire four-year run, and in November 2011 as Myrna in the "That Still Small Voice" episode of Once Upon a Time. She also guest starred in Bucket & Skinner's Epic Adventures.

In 2016, Hennesy appeared in the soap opera web series The Bay as Karen Blackwell. She won a Daytime Emmy Award for Outstanding Supporting or Guest Actress in a Digital Daytime Drama Series for the role. Also in 2016, Hennesy was named an American Humane Association celebrity ambassador and spoke before a congressional committee on the organization's new humane conservation initiative. Hennesy is also the producer and host of Animal Magnetism, a radio program featuring wildlife and domestic animal professionals. The program focuses on welfare and conservation issues and examines both the human-animal bond and the global increase in human-wildlife conflict resulting from human over-population growth and climate change. In 2017, she was in the short film Bleeding Hearts: The Arteries of Glenda Bryant with Barbara Rush. In 2018, Soaps She Knows reported Hennesy would star in the film The Swing of Things which was released in 2020. Also that year, she was in the film Fatal Affair.

In 2019, Hennesy was in the film St. Agatha. Also that year she was in the film Star Wars: The Rise of Skywalker.

=== Author ===
Hennesy has written a series of children's books based on the character Pandora. The first one, called Pandora Gets Jealous, was released January 2008. The sequel, Pandora Gets Vain, was released August 2008. The third book in the series, Pandora Gets Lazy, released March 2009. Book four, Pandora Gets Heart, was released in January 2010. The fifth book, Pandora Gets Angry, was released in February 2011. Book six, Pandora Gets Greedy, was released in June 2012. Book seven, Pandora Gets Frightened, was released in 2013.

Hennesy wrote the 2011 novel The Secret Life of Damian Spinelli featuring characters from General Hospital. The novel reached #16 on the New York Times Best Seller list.

== Personal life ==
Hennesy is the niece of actress Barbara Rush and cousin of Fox News reporter Claudia Cowan. She lives in Los Angeles. In 2007, Hennesy married Donald Agnelli. They divorced in 2013. She is a trapeze artist, a skill she demonstrated during a 2015 episode of Jessie.

On October 28, 2025, Hennesy broke her leg and needed surgery. She had one surgery and another on November 4. Hennesy recovered from both surgeries to return to acting with a wheelchair.

== Filmography ==
=== Film ===
Year	Film	Role	Director(s)	Notes
1992	I Don't Buy Kisses Anymore	Bowling Alley Waitress	Robert Marcarelli	Romantic–comedy film Credited as Carolyn Henessey
1993	Lightning in a Bottle	Marsha Timmons	Jeff Kwitny	Drama film
1999	Hee/r	Minnie Pearl	Chip Chinery	Short film
2000	Street Fighter Alpha: The Animation	Rose (voice)	Masahiro Hosoda; Joe Romersa; Shigeyasu Yamauchi	Anime film
2001	The Elite	Elaine	Terry Cunningham	Thriller film
2002	Surprise	Whitney	Loren E. Chadima	Short film
2002	Global Effect	Meredith Tripp	Terry Cunningham	Thriller film
2002	Engaging Peter	Vivian	Kerry Bailey; Michael R. Williams	Comedy film
2003	Wave Babes	Maureen	Lisa Knox	Comedy film Direct-to-video
2003	Terminator 3: Rise of the Machines	Rich Woman	Jonathan Mostow	Science fiction action film
2003	Legally Blonde 2: Red, White & Blonde	Congresswoman with Haircut	Charles Herman-Wurmfeld	Comedy film
2004	Appleseed	Athena Aerios (voice)	Shinji Aramaki	Anime film Credited as Lee West
2004	The Second Degree	Chrissy Le Matin	Randall Gifford	Drama film Credited as Caroline Hennessey
2005	Off the Hook	The Enchilada	Michael Town	Short film
2005	The Heat Chamber	Lila	Mark Norberg	Drama film
2006	Bambi II	Bambi's Mother (voice)	Brian Pimental	Animated film Direct-to-video
2006	Click	Kathy O'Doyle	Frank Coraci	Fantasy comedy-drama film
2006	The Emerald Sun	Major Danes	Michael Town	Short film
2006	Conversations with God	Sharon Parker	Stephen Deutsch	Drama film
2006	Outta Sync	Phaedra Lee	Ezra Buzzington	Comedy film
2007	Sublime	Cheryl	Tony Krantz	Psychological horror film Direct-to-video
2007	Feeding	Carolyn	James Arnall	Short film
2007	Cougar Club	Judge Margaret Emerson	Christopher Duddy	Comedy film
2007	Believers	Lina Vance	Daniel Myrick	Horror film Direct-to-video
2007	Til Death Does His Part	God	Michael Town	Short film
2008	Boob Jobs & Jesus	Jody	Marshall McCabe; Ursula Whittaker	Short film
2008	Yes	Ms. Cummings	Joshua M. Dragotta	Short film
2008	Shattered!	Adrienne	Joseph Rassulo	Drama film
2008	Necessary Evil	Carole Fielding	Peter J. Eaton	Horror film
2009	Half Truth	Soap actress	Wade Gasque	Short film
2009	Scream of the Bikini	Ronda (voice)	Kiff Scholl	Comedy film
2009	It's Not Me, It's You	Therapist	Doc Crotzer	Short film
2010	Annie in the Aisle of Irma	Marsha	Tess Sweet	Short film
2011	I Love You Like Crazy	Dr. Sing	Tess Sweet	Short film
2011	Happy Hour	Dr. Shelia Gilbert (voice)	Kat Coiro	Short film
2013	Obituary Burglars	Carol	Ari Costa	Short film
2014	The Mundane Goddess	Demeter	Henco J.	Short film
2014	Mostly Ghostly: Have You Met My Ghoulfriend?	Coach Freeley	Peter Hewitt	Horror film
2014	Dance-Off	Mary	Alex Di Marco	Drama film
2015	Hybrids	Aradia	Tony Randel	Comedy film
2015	Mothers of the Bride	Kelly Court	Sam Irvin	Comedy film
2015	You're Killing Me	Candice	Jim Hansen	Drama film
2015	A Kind of Magic	Maggie	Tosca Musk	Comedy film
2015	Frieda's Turn	Millie	Jay J. Levy	Short film
2016	Doritos: Swipe for Doritos	Self	Tyler Glodt	Short film
2016	Courting Des Moines	Gov. Joanna Sampson	Brent Roske	Drama film
2016	Aged	Regina	Dorian Frankel	Short film
2016	Better Criminal	Police Chief Ackerman	Ben Burke	Thriller film
2016	The Holy Man	Betty Rodriguez	Javier Calderon	Sports–drama film
2017	Bleeding Hearts: The Arteries of Glenda Bryant	Glenda Bryant	Jamie Heinrich; James Kelton	Short film Also producer
2017	This Is Christmas	—N/a	Joseph Rassulo	Drama film
2017	Farmhouse	Lynn	Minnie Schedeen	Short film
2017	Diamond Dayze	The Boss	Alexandra Adomaitis	Short film Also producer
2018	St. Agatha	Mother	Darren Lynn Bousman	Horror film
2019	She & Her	Poppy Sinclaire	Nate Hapke	Short film
2019	Trip's Duplage	B.D. Grant	Spencer Squire	Short film
2019	Star Wars: The Rise of Skywalker	Domine Lithe	J. J. Abrams	Epic space opera film
2020	The Swing of Things	Mama McGursky	Matt Shapira	Comedy film
2020	Fatal Affair	Janice	Peter Sullivan	Psychological thriller film
2021	Later Daters	Carolyn	Fred Shahadi	Short film
2022	Diamond in the Rough	Stella Archebold	Jeannette Godoy	Comedy film
2022	Combat Radio: A Christmas Carol	Mrs. Chatchit	Carlos Alberto Barbosa Jr. Keythe Farley	Comedy film
	Vanished: Searching for My Sister	Detective Nichols		
2023	Echo Base	Kathleen Wolff	Craig Goldstein	Science fiction film
2024	Running on Empty	Tilda	Daniel André	Comedy film
2024	Wineville	Aunt Margaret	Brande Roderick	Horror film Also producer
2025	A Spicy But Not Too Spicy Plumber	The Cougar	Björn Rühmann	Short film
TBA	Concert Heroes		Joe Nunez	

=== Television ===
Year	Series	Role	Notes
1991	Visitors from the Unknown	Janice Godfrey	Made-for-TV movie directed by Penelope Spheeris
1993	Dark Justice	Jill	Episode: "Pygmalion"
1995	Deadly Invasion: The Killer Bee Nightmare	USDA Representative	Made-for-TV movie directed by Rockne S. O'Bannon
1995	Grace Under Fire	Gloria	Episode: "Jimmy Goes Away"
1995–96	Night Stand with Dick Dietrick	Layla; Amanda	Episodes: "The Fame Show"; "Sexaholics"
1996	Arli$$	Tania Blanchi	Episode: "Timing Is Everything"
1997	Lost on Earth	Katie; Denise	Episodes: "They're Alive"; "The Rudy Show"
1997	Wings	Flight Attendant	Episode: "Just Call Me Angel"
1997	Party of Five	Alice	Episode: "Leap of Faith"
1997	The Naked Truth	Flight Attendant	Episode: "We Almost Had Paris"
1997–98	Jenny	Chase Gardner	Recurring role
1998	Encore! Encore!	Barbara	Episode: "The Diary"
1999	It's Like, You Know...	Cathy	Episode: "Welcome to L.A."; Pilot
1999	Dual! Parallel Trouble Adventure	Yayoi Schwaei (voice)	3 episodes
1999	The Legend of Black Heaven	Rammona Lee (voice)	4 episodes Dubbed in English
1999	Thanks	Henrietta Randolph	Episode: "Tobacco"
1999–04	That '70s Show	Sharon Singer; Patty Ryals	3 episodes
2000	Moesha	Dr. Miller	Episode: "He Doth Protest Too Much"
2000–01	Dawson's Creek	Mrs. Valentine	Recurring role
2000–01	Strip Mall	Caroline Cantwell	4 episodes
2001	Reba	Mrs. Montgomery	Episode: "Tea and Antipathy"
2002	Any Day Now	Phyllis	Episode: "Boys Will Be Boys"
2002	The Young and the Restless	Penelope Quinlan	Episode #7351
2002	Judging Amy	Louise Rodericks	Episode: "Come Back Soon"
2002	Bram & Alice	Patricia	Episode: "Goody Two Shoes"
2002–05	Ghost in the Shell: Stand Alone Complex	Kago's Mother (voice: English version)	Episode: "Testation"
2002, 2006–present	General Hospital	Maureen Neilsen, Diane Miller	Recurring role, 420 episodes
2003	The Big O	Vera Ronstadt	Contract role: Season 2 only
2003	Half & Half	Mrs. Scranton	Episode: "The Big Sexy Shame Episode"
2003	Recipe for Disaster	Mrs. Devries	Made-for-TV-movie directed by Harvey Frost
2003	What I Like About You	Dr. Judith 'Judy' Haven	Episode: "When Holly Met Tina"
2003	Android Kidaider	Chigusa Sakamoto (voice: English version)	Unknown episodes
2004	Significant Others	Realtor	Episode: "The Right House, the Wrong Gender & a Turn"
2005	Barbershop	Mrs. Kane	Episode: "Debates and Dead People"
2005	Adventures in Odyssey	Ellen Shepard (voice)	Episode: "Always"
2006	Girlfriends	Melora Stewart	Episode: "The Music in Me"
2006	Commander in Chief	TV Interviewer	Episode: "Wind Beneath My Wing"
2006	Drake & Josh	Mrs. Abernathy	Episode: "I Love Sushi"
2007	General Hospital: Night Shift	Diane Miller	Episode: "Falling Star"
2008	Little Miss CEO	Ms. Rivers	Made-for-TV movie directed by John Bowab
2009	Penny Dreadfuls	Carolyn; Dorothy	Episodes: "Feeding"; "All Tomorrow's Parties"
2009–13	Cougar Town	Barb/Barbara Coman	Recurring role
2010	Better People	Ivy	Made-for-TV-movie directed by Dorsay Alavi
2010–11	Everyone Counts	Sheila	4 episodes
2011	Shameless	Mrs. Neidereiter	Episode: "But at Last Came a Knock"
2011	Once Upon a Time	Myrna	Episode: "That Still Small Voice"
2011–15	Jessie	Mrs. Rhoda Chesterfield	Recurring role
2012	Bucket and Skinner's Epic Adventures	R.J. Caldwell	Episode: "Epic Cuffs"
2012	Marie	Guest	Episode: "Kristi Yamaguchi"
2012	True Blood	Rosalyn	Recurring role (season 5)
2012	MotherLover	Angela Thompson Maynard	6 episodes
2013	Anger Management	Barb	Episode: "Charlie's Dad Begins to Lose It"
2013	The Middle	Connie McDonald	Episode: "Winners and Losers"
2013	Ray Donovan	Blanche Blaylock	Episode: "The Golem"
2013	Single Siblings	Mrs. Farmsworth	2 episodes
2014	Acting Dead	Dr. Ivana Wurshter	2 episodes
2014	Devious Maids	Mrs. Parker	Episode: "You Can't Take It With You"
2014	PragerU	Narrator	Episode: "The Progressive Income Tax: A Tale of Three Brothers"
2014	Revenge	Mrs. Ellis	Recurring role
2015	A Deadly Adoption	Debby	Made-for-TV movie directed by Rachel Lee Goldenberg
2015	The Mindy Project	Mrs. Guterman	Episode: "Jody Kimball-Kinney Is My Husband"
2015–16	These People	Julie	9 episodes
2016	Gilmore Girls: A Year in the Life	Toni	2 episodes
2016	The Wrong House	Angela Chasen	Made-for-TV movie directed by Sam Irvin
2017	Take It from the Top	Delores	Made-for-TV movie directed by Ted Lange
2017	Business Doing Pleasure	Linda	Main cast
2017	Broken Dreams Blvd	Betty	Made-for-TV movie directed by Kevin Jordan
2017	Two Sentence Horror Stories	Marie	Episode: "Second Skin"
2017	Future Man	Wanda	Episode: "A Blowjob Before Dying"
2018	The 5th Quarter	Maureen	Episode: "Searching for Enthusiasm"
2018	The Wedding Do Over	Rose Clark	Made-for-TV movie directed by W.D. Hogan
2018	Champions	Grandma Gayle	Episode: "Grandma Dearest"
2018	Suits	Josie Grey	Episode: "Motion to Delay"
2018	He Knows Your Every Move	Caitlin	Made-for-TV movie directed by Lane Shefter Bishop
2018	Lego Star Wars: All-Stars	General Leia Organa (voice)	3 episodes
2018	A Snow White Christmas	Victoria Snow	Made-for-TV movie directed by Kristin Fairweather
2018	Star Wars Resistance	General Leia Organa (voice)	Episode: "Station Theta Black"
2019	NCIS: Los Angeles	Bunny	Episode: "Born to Run"
2019	Adam Ruins Everything	Miranda	Episode: "Adam Ruins Little Bugs"
2019	Daughterhood	Carrie	Episode: "Mother's Day"
2020	Mom	Professor Winslow	Episode: "A Judgy Face and Your Grandma's Drawers"
2020	Calling for Love	Mercy Lewis	Made-for-TV movie directed by Kristin Fairweather
2021	Most Wanted Santa	Rose	Made-for-TV movie directed by Kristin Fairweather
2021	Red Riding Hoods	Madison	Episode: "Grandmother's House"
2022	Vanished: Searching for My Sister	Detective Nichols	Made-for-TV movie directed by Timothy Woodward Jr.
2022	Discover Indie Film	Poppy Sinclaire	Episode: "Clean Cut, Nice Shoes, I Don't Need A Sledgehammer, and She & Her"
2022	Studio City	Gloria Winston	5 episodes
2022	NCIS	Secretary of the Navy Tara Flynn	Episode: "Love Lost"
2022–24	Big Nate	Clara Godfrey, Geraldine Shipulski (voices)	Main cast
2024	Velma	Elizabeth	Episode: "Female Utopia"
2025	The Rookie	Caroline McGrath	Episode: "A Deadly Secret"
2025	Electric Bloom	Dolores	Episode: "How We Learned to Love Our Haters"
2026	Max & The Midknights	Clara Godfrey (voice)	Episode: "The Great Crossover"

=== Web ===
Year	Title	Role	Notes
2016	Youthful Daze	Randy's mom	78 episodes
2016	Swedish Dicks	Anne	Episode: "Tale of the Tape"
2016	The Bay	Karen Blackwell	2 episodes
2019	Liza on Demand	Cora Reeves	Episode "What Up, Fam"
2023	Undressed with Pol' and Patrik	Herself	Episode: "General Hospital, Daytime Emmys, I'm a Vegan in Costa Rica, Love, Loss and the Flying Trapeze"
2023	The Case Within	Debbie Baumer	3 episodes
2023	Eliances Heroes Show	Herself	Episode: "Carolyn Hennesy"

=== Video games ===
Year	Game	Role	Notes
1999	Jumpstar: Toddlers	Ms. Nobel	Credited as Carolyn Hennessy
2000	Casper: Friends Around the World	Casper the Friendly Ghost	
2001	Star Trek: Away Team	Aloram Vas (voice)	Credited as Carolyn Hennessy
2001	Casper: Spirit Dimensions	Casper the Friendly Ghost	
2002	Xenosaga Episode I: Der Wille zur Macht	Juli Mizrahi	Dubbed in English
2002	Star Trek: Bridge Commander	Captain Eina Zeiss/Captain Elizabeth Haley/Captain Torenn (voice)	Credited as Carolyn Hennesey
2002	Galerians: Ash	Various	Dubbed in English; Credited as Carolyn Rush
2002	.hack//Infection	Gardenia (voice: English version)	
2002	.hack//Mutation	Gardenia (voice: English version)	
2002	Shrek Extra Large	Additional voices	
2002	.hack//Outbreak	Gardenia (voice: English version)	
2003	.hack//Quarantine	Gardenia (voice: English version)	
2005	Tales of Legendia	Additional voices (voice: English version)	
2006	Ar Tonelico: Melody of Elemia	Ayano Raizer Elduke (voice: English version)	
2006	Suikoden V	Arshtat (voice: English version)	
2006	Persona 3	Ken Amada (voice: English version)	
2006	Growlanser: Heritage of War	Professor Pernagi/Nora (voice: English version)	
2007	Ghost Rider	Lilith (voice)	
2007	Persona 3 FES	Ken Amada (voice: English version)	
2007	Operation Darkness	Carmilla (voice: English version)	
2007	Supreme Commander: Forged Alliance	Loyalist Leader Mathea/Order Commander Gari	
2007	Golden Axe: Beast Rider	(voice)	
2008	Baroque	The Absolute God/The Collector/The Horned Girl	
2009	Persona 3 Portable	Ken Amada (voice: English version)	
2009	World in Conflict: Soviet Assault	(voice)	
2010	Metro 2033	(voice)	
2014	Metro 2033 Redux	(voice)	
2016	The Technomancer	Angela Seeker, Additional Voices	
2017	Star Trek: Bridge Crew	Lieutenant T'Nar, Additional Voices (voice)	
2018	Blade Runner: Revelations	Lilith Tyrell, Background Voices (voice)	
2022	Lego Star Wars: The Skywalker Saga	General Leia Organa (voice)	
2025	The Outer Worlds 2	(voice)	

== Awards and nominations ==
Year	Award	Result	Category	Series	Ref.
2000	Los Angeles Drama Critics Circle	Won	Outstanding Comedic Actress	Career	
2004	Ovation Award	Won	Featured Actress in a Play	"The Fan Maroo"	
2007	TV Guide's "Best of 2007" Awards	Won	Best Supporting Actress	General Hospital	
2009	Canadian Spirit Award	Won		General Hospital	
2010	Daytime Emmy Award	Nominated	Outstanding Supporting Actress in a Drama Series	General Hospital	
2017	Daytime Emmy Award	Won	Outstanding Supporting or Guest Actress in a Digital Daytime Drama Series	The Bay	
2017	Indie Series Award	Won	Best Guest Actress — Drama	The Bay	
2021	Daytime Emmy Award	Nominated	Outstanding Supporting Actress in a Drama Series	General Hospital	
