= Rest Stop: Don't Look Back =

- Directed by: Shawn Papazian
- Written by: John Shiban
- Produced by: John Shiban; Tony Krantz; Daniel Myrick; Steve Ecclesine
- Starring: Richard Tillman; Jessie Ward; Graham Norris
- Cinematography: Jas Shelton
- Edited by: Richard Byard
- Music by: Bear McCreary
- Production company: Raw Feed
- Distributed by: Warner Home Video
- Release date: September 30, 2008
- Running time: 89 minutes
- Country: United States
- Language: English

Rest Stop: Don't Look Back is a 2008 American horror film directed by Shawn Papazian and written by John Shiban. It is the sequel to the 2006 film Rest Stop, and stars Richard Tillman, Jessie Ward, Graham Norris, and Brionne Davis. The only actors to return from the first film are Joey Mendicino (Jesse Hilts) and the R.V. Family (Diane Salinger, Michael Childers, Gary and Edmund Entin and Mikey Post).

The film was released direct-to-video in the United States on September 30, 2008, by Warner Home Video.

== Plot ==
In 1972 on the Old Highway, the religious R.V. family encounters The Driver stranded on the side of the road next to a yellow truck, completely out of gas. Once in the R.V., the mother heavily flirts with The Driver and asks Scotty, her physically deformed child, to take a picture of him with his camera. Later that night, the Father finds The Driver having sex with his wife. His wife falsely claims it was non-consensual and eagerly encourages her husband to attack him. They then take The Driver outside and "cleanse" him of his sins by brutally torturing him to death. The next morning, they bury him at the rest stop and keep his eyes. Before they can leave, The Driver's ghost kills the whole family, then drives away in the yellow truck.

Thirty-five years later, and one year after Jesse and Nicole disappeared, Jesse's brother Tom returns home from Iraq. Tom decides he wants to go to California to look for his brother with his girlfriend Marilyn and one of Nicole's friends Jared, who had a long-time crush on Nicole. On their way to California, the trio stops at a gas station. Tom shows the strange gas station attendant a picture of Jesse and Nicole and asks if he had seen them. The attendant says he did see them and warned them to be careful. Jared finds a horse-riding badge that belonged to Nicole, prompting Tom to demand more information from the attendant. He tells them that he found the badge on the Old Highway just a mile up the road.

Jared, in his own car, decides to use a porta-potty at a construction site while Tom and Marilyn continue on. Tom spots the rest stop and decides to check it out in case Jesse and Nicole had used it. Back at the construction site, The Driver harasses Jared before ramming into the porta-potty with the truck and covering Jared in feces. At the rest stop, The Driver kidnaps Tom while Marilyn is using the bathroom. Marilyn sees Nicole's ghost inside the other stall and rushes into it but Nicole disappears. She then goes outside to tell Tom, but all signs of him and their car have vanished.

As night falls, Jared washes up and changes clothes. Nicole's ghost pops up in the backseat of his car and, believing she’s really there, Jared begins to console her. They soon start to have sex, but Nicole ends up vomiting blood and disappearing. Jared returns to his car but it no longer works, he runs into the road and comes across the R.V. family. They give him a ride to the rest stop while eerily hinting at what happened to them and what will also happen to Jared. Jared relays everything to Marilyn, who in turn, tells him Tom is missing. They decide to hike back to the gas station to find out everything the attendant knows.

Meanwhile, The Driver tortures Tom on the school bus but he’s able to escape from his bindings while The Driver is gone. Tom searches the area for Jesse and finds him tied up in a cage. He frees Jesse and carries him to his truck. But as they’re driving away, Jesse turns to turn to him and says, "You should have saved me" before disappearing. Confused, Tom heads back to the gas station.

Marilyn and Jared learn from the attendant that they need to find The Driver's eyes and burn them to put his spirit to rest, but The Driver set a trap for them. Jared wakes up and finds himself and Marilyn tied up, while The Driver and attendant stands before them. The attendant, speaking for The Driver, tells Jared that Marilyn was unfaithful to Tom and needs to be "cleansed." Jared initially refuses, but then has his right eye cut out by The Driver. Jared then gives in and uses a drill to torture Marilyn.

Tom arrives at the gas station to find Marilyn still tied up but alone. Just as day breaks, they exit the station to find the aged and abandoned motorhome parked outside. Marilyn insists on finding The Driver’s eyes, then they hear the yellow truck approaching. Tom loads up with weapons he kept in his backseat to take on The Driver. Marilyn searches around the R.V. and finds Jared, she encourages him to help her. Tom and The Driver fight while Marilyn and Jared search for the eyes. They decide to look outside and Jared runs into Scotty’s ghost. Scotty tells him that the twins have The Driver's eyes, but the twins have now locked themselves in the R.V. Jared assists Marilyn in setting the R.V. on fire, destroying it. Just as The Driver is about to kill Tom, he disappears.

During their drive home, Jared discovers his picture of Nicole, that he kept on his visor, is now missing. Just as he looks back at the road, the R.V. smashes into his car. Sometime later that day in a motel, Tom ponders Jared's disappearance to Marilyn. She begins crying next to him in bed and Tom asks what’s wrong. Marilyn responds, "You should have saved me." and the yellow truck begins revving its engine outside of the room’s window. Tom looks out of the window and into the truck's cab, now seeing Marilyn crying in the passenger seat. Tom rushes out of the room but the parking lot is now empty, he realizes that Marilyn didn't survive.

The Driver then continues driving around the Old Highway.

== Cast ==
- Richard Tillman as Tom Hilts
- Jessie Ward as Marilyn
- Graham Norris as Jared
- Joey Mendicino as Jesse Hilts
- Julie Mond as Nicole Carrow
- Brionne Davis as the Driver
- Diane Salinger as the mother
- Michael Childers as the father
- Edmund Entin as twin #2
- Mikey Post as Scotty
- Steve Railsback as store clerk

== Reception ==
Cinema Blend said of the film, "A scary movie is made through the story...the end result is a laughable mess that feels more like a car zooming down the highway with no brakes."
