= Jessie Ward (actress) =

American actress

- Born: February 18, 1982 (age 44); Manasquan, New Jersey, U.S.
- Other name: Jessica Ward
- Years active: 2000-2015
- Website: http://www.jessieward.com

Jessie Ward, sometimes credited as Jessica Ward, is a classically trained ballerina, and an American film and television actress.

== Early life ==
She was born on February 18, 1982, in Manasquan, New Jersey. Ward began studying ballet seriously at the age of nine. She lived and studied at the School of American Ballet as a teenager and attended high school at the Professional Children's School in New York. She was chosen as the highest scoring dancer in the United States by Britain's Royal Academy of Dance, which earned her a ballet scholarship to study in England. She has performed numerous solo and principal roles with various professional ballet companies across the United States.

== Career ==
Ward left New York and moved to Los Angeles to pursue her acting career. She has appeared in numerous national television commercials as well as performing in a music video with Jennifer Lopez. In March 2006, she appeared in a guest role as Brianna on FX Network's It's Always Sunny in Philadelphia alongside Eddie Mekka and Danny DeVito. Ward played the female lead opposite Tatum O’Neal in Wicked Wicked Games in 2006–2007, which was her second appearance on MyNetworkTV, her first being cast as Penelope in Desire in 2006.

Since then she has appeared as a guest star on CSI: Crime Scene Investigation in 2007, and was cast as the female lead in a thriller called Rest Stop: Don’t Look Back in 2008. She has also appeared in other film and TV programs such as: Godspeed, One Tree Hill, Reed Between the Lines, What to Expect When You’re Expecting and The Game.

== Filmography ==
Year	Title	Role	Notes
2006	It's Always Sunny In Philadelphia	Brianna	TV series Season 2, episode 5
2006	Desire	Penelope	TV series, 9 episodes
2007	Wicked Wicked Games	Emma Crawford	TV series, 49 episodes
2007	CSI: Crime Scene Investigation	Faith Maroney	TV series - "The Good, the Bad and the Dominatrix"
2008	Rest Stop: Don't Look Back	Marilyn	Movie
2009	Godspeed	Rebecca Shepherd	Movie
2011	Reed Between the Lines	Ms. Gallier	TV series - Season 1, Ep.9 - "Let's Talk About Boys in Tights"
2012	One Tree Hill	Intern #1	TV series - Season 9, Ep. 3 - "Love the Way You Lie"
2012	What to Expect When You're Expecting	Cute Girl	Movie
2013	Drop Dead Diva	Emma	TV series - Season 5, Ep. 8 - "50 Shades of Grayson"
2014	Reckless	Taylor Dunham	TV series - 3 episodes
2014	Rita Mahtoubian Is Not A Terrorist	Rita's co-worker #1	Short Film
2015	The Game	Female Barber	TV series - Season 8, Ep. 6 - "Acting Class and Rebound Ass"
