= Wicked Wicked Games =

American telenovela

- Title card
- Directed by: Terry Cunningham; Dennis Dimster; P. David Ebersole; Jeff Hare; Jeremy Stanford
- Starring: Tatum O'Neal; Clive Robertson; Jack Krizmanich; David Smith; Jessie Ward; Kate French
- Opening theme: "Think Again" by Blond Mafia
- Country of origin: United States
- Original language: English
- No. of episodes: 66

Production
- Production locations: San Diego and Del Mar, California
- Production company: 20th Century Fox Television

Original release
- Network: MyNetworkTV
- Release: December 6, 2006 – March 6, 2007

Related
- Desire

Wicked Wicked Games is a telenovela that debuted on December 6, 2006 on the American television network MyNetworkTV. Twentieth Television produced 62 episodes to air weekdays. The limited-run serial was directed by Terry Cunningham, Dennis Dimster, P. David Ebersole, Jeff Hare and Jeremy Stanford. It focuses on a bitter, obsessed woman's vendetta against her former lover.

As of 2021, the entire series is streaming on Tubi.

== Story ==
This romantic melodrama starred Tatum O'Neal as Blythe Hunter, a beautiful scorned woman, whose boyfriend Theodore Crawford (Clive Robertson) left her twenty-five years ago to marry someone else. As revenge, she decides to destroy him by grooming her two sons to marry his two daughters and take over The Tides, a racetrack in Del Mar, California. She wreaks havoc on the Crawfords, but the plan doesn't go the way she had hoped.

Wicked Wicked Games also starred David Smith and Jack Krizmanich as Blythe's sons, Josh and Aaron, respectively. Josh is a doctor who gets manipulated into Blythe's schemes by the more "wicked" son Aaron. Jessie Ward and Kate French played Emma and Brooke respectively, the Crawford daughters.

Blythe approaches Aaron to pose as "Daniel Karol" and help her undermine Theodore and take control of the Tides. Blythe also employs her lawyer, Benjamin Grey to help her do her dirty work. Aaron quickly gets the job, and begins to work for Theo. Only Taylor Burns, CFO of the Tides, is suspicious of him. Over the show's first month, Emma gets engaged to the Tides lawyer Edward (who is cheating on her with secretary Jennifer), Brooke quickly falls for Daniel, and Blythe reveals herself to Theo, and tries to rekindle the flame between them, steaming Theo's girlfriend, Hope Lorca, who raised Brooke and Emma after their mother's death, and was the family housekeeper.

Soon, Emma makes a startling discovery- that Theo is not Brooke and herself's real father, but her late mother, Anna had a lover named Gavin. She confronts Theo and Madeline, Theo's sister, who confirm the truth. Madeline indulges in cyber romance with "Phillipe", who she confides in. Lani Walker, Blythe's assistant, falls for Taylor, and is shocked by the lengths her boss is going to. Blythe loves to torture Lani, and she soon begins to undermine Blythe, a huge mistake on her part. Theo is soon on to Blythe. Blythe is thrilled to learn that Theo may be planning to propose to her, but instead proposes to Hope, which soon pleases Blythe, realizing that he will be too busy planning a wedding to notice his business being taken from him. Not too much later, Blythe takes over the Tides, and throws Theo out. She takes pride in revealing that "Daniel" is her son, Aaron, which also stuns Brooke. Theo is devastated, and turns to alcohol for comfort. Jennifer wants Edward to leave Emma, and Edward's obsession with Emma grows, as Emma continues to fall for Josh. Taylor ends things with Lani after realizing that she was aware of what Blythe was planning, and Lani is devastated. Brooke continues on a downward spiral with alcohol and drugs. She soon learns that her father, Gavin died several years ago, and nearly dies from an overdose.

Tension had been mounting between Theo and Hope following the loss of the Tides, and Hope decides to leave town for a while. Madeline asks her to stay and work things out, but Hope thinks it is for the best. She has a final encounter with Blythe, when Blythe strangles her to death. Blythe makes it look as though Hope completely vanished, and left Theo. Blythe continues with the second stage of the plan, getting her hands on the Crawford estate. Blythe reveals to Theo that Josh and Aaron are his sons and that she was pregnant when he left her for Anna. "Why, because he's your son?" Theo asks. "No, because he's yours." Blythe reveals in front of Aaron. Aaron and Brooke as well as Josh and Emma do eventually get together because Brooke and Emma are their stepsisters and they are their stepbrothers because they're Theo's sons just like they're Anna's daughters with her lover Gavin. It's revealed that Blythe is bipolar and has another personality who she created after Theo left her pregnant with their sons.

== Production notes ==
This serial was derived from a 1998 Venezuelan series, Aunque me Cueste la Vida (Though It Might Cost Me My Life). In it, Julie Restifo played the vengeful mother, who was named Belgica Michelena. Production began in July 2006 and continued for six days a week over four months. Tatum O'Neal openly complained about the grueling schedule.

The show was originally intended to run in syndication as Art of Betrayal under the Desire umbrella title. The Desire logo appeared during the opening credits and MyNetworkTV's website listed the serial as "part of the Desire series". Sean Young and Gordon Thomson were originally signed for the lead roles played by Tatum O'Neal and Clive Robertson. Actress Jessie Ward played Penelope Sayers on another MyNetworkTV telenovela, Desire.

The theme song for this series is Think Again by Blond Mafia. Recap shows originally aired on Saturdays but were replaced by movies on February 3, 2007. While Harper Entertainment announced plans to publish a book called Wicked, Wicked Games: The Diary of Blythe Hunter, it has not been released. The Del Mar Racetrack was used for race track location shooting. Other scenes were filmed at Stu Segall Productions in San Diego.

== Cast ==
Actor	Role
Tatum O'Neal Reese witherspoon	Blythe Hunter
Clive Robertson	Theodore Crawford
David Smith	Josh Spencer
Jessie Ward	Emma Crawford
Jack Krizmanich	Aaron Spencer
Kate French Dove Cameron	Brooke Crawford
Debbe Dunning Vanessa Byrant	Hope Lorca
Serena Scott Thomas	Madeline "Maddie" Crawford
Joan Severance	Anna Whitman
Femi Emiola	Lani Walker
Kim Porter	Violet Walker
Paul Greene	Benjamin Gray
Tim McElwee	Edward Hoffman
Tanja Reichert	Jennifer Harrison
Nicholas Irons	Taylor Burnes
Azie Tesfai	Cherry Milton
