= Ghost Voyage =

- Film poster
- Written by: Rob Mecarini
- Directed by: James Oxford
- Starring: Antonio Sabato Jr. Deanna Russo; Nicholas Irons; Cary-Hiroyuki Tagawa; P.J. Marino
- Music by: Nathan Furst
- Country of origin: United States
- Original language: English

Production
- Producers: Jeffrey Beach; Phillip J. Roth
- Cinematography: Anton Barkarski
- Editor: John Quinn
- Running time: 100 minutes

Original release
- Network: Sci Fi Channel; G2KTV
- Release: January 26, 2008

Ghost Voyage is a 2008 horror television film produced for broadcast on the Sci Fi Channel in the United States. Its cast includes Antonio Sabato Jr., Deanna Russo, P.J. Marino and Cary-Hiroyuki Tagawa. The story contains many elements of an updated Outward Bound and Between Two Worlds.

== Plot ==
Nine strangers, most of whom are engaged in criminal and/or morally questionable acts, wake up on an abandoned cargo ship with no memory of how they arrived there. The ship's steward explains the rules to them. The unfortunate passengers soon find out that the ship is haunted by malevolent spirits and that they've each been brought there for a particular reason. The spirits immediately take those who have committed great sins (i.e. murder, adultery, etc.).

Six of the strangers die because they broke a rule. The remaining 3 learn that they are actually dead. The steward congratulates them for not breaking any rules, and then explains what is happening. According to an old legend, people who have committed sins are transported to this ship after they die. The sea tests them to see if they have learned from their lives. Those who pass the test are given a second chance at life. Those who don't have their spirits swallowed by the sea and are thrown into Hell.

Working together, the three retrieve a boat on the cargo ship and set sail. More demons attempt to kill them on the sea. One of them is sucked to hell after being selfish, and the other two survive and get a second chance. They get back to their lives but have no memory of the events on the ship and do not remember each other when they meet. Later, the steward explains the rules to the next set of strangers, implying a continuous cycle.

== Cast ==
- Antonio Sabato Jr as Michael
- Deanna Russo as Serena
- Nicholas Irons as Nicholai
- P.J. Marino as Raymond
- Adrian Neil as Simon
- Julian Berlin as Jessica
- James Patric Moran as Ronnie
- Cary-Hiroyuki Tagawa as Steward

== Reception ==
The film received a very negative review at Dread Central, stating that "Yet despite being unoriginal, not the least bit suspenseful, so simplistic as to make the average “Goosebumps” story seem layered, with characters that are total morons who keep doing unrealistically moronic things, and often providing viewers with little more than all the thrills and chills that comes with watching people slowly walkabout the interior of an empty cargo ship for long periods of time", it was not overly boring.
