= Satisfaction (American TV series) =

American television series

- Genre: Drama
- Created by: Sean Jablonski
- Starring: Matt Passmore; Stéphanie Szostak; Blair Redford; Katherine LaNasa; Michelle DeShon; Deanna Russo
- Composers: Ludwig Göransson; Nathan Matthew David
- Country of origin: United States
- Original language: English
- No. of seasons: 2
- No. of episodes: 20

Production
- Executive producers: Russ Krasnoff; Gary Foster; Sean Jablonski; Mike Listo
- Producers: Jake Aust; Preston Fischer; Jane Bartelme; Lori-Etta Taub; Peter Macmanus; Michael Pendell
- Editors: Steven Sprung; Christian Kinnard; Noah Pontell; Ruthie Aslan; Jesse Ellis; Cindy Mollo; Peter B. Ellis; Robert Ivison
- Running time: 43 minutes
- Production companies: Krasnoff/Foster Entertainment; Rhythm Arts Entertainment; Sony Pictures Television; Universal Cable Productions

Original release
- Network: USA Network
- Release: July 17, 2014 – December 18, 2015

Satisfaction is a drama television series created by Sean Jablonski. It premiered on the USA Network on July 17, 2014. On February 26, 2016, USA cancelled Satisfaction after two seasons. Season 1 was released on DVD on January 20, 2015.

== Premise ==
Money manager Neil Truman and his wife Grace confront their relationship and life issues when Neil finds his wife having intercourse with a male escort. Neil then decides to become an escort himself, unbeknownst to his wife. Neil's experiences encourage him to then try to rekindle his marriage.

== Cast ==
=== Main ===
- Matt Passmore as Neil Truman
- Stéphanie Szostak as Grace Truman
- Blair Redford as Simon Waverly, a male escort whom Grace pays for sex
- Katherine LaNasa as Adriana, the head of a male escort service
- Michelle DeShon as Anika Truman, Neil and Grace's teenaged daughter
- Deanna Russo as Stephanie, Grace's sister

=== Recurring ===
- Spencer Garrett as Victor O'Connell
- Tzi Ma as Zen Master
- Tom Nowicki as Charles Lipton
- Brittany Hall as Rosalie
- Leon Thomas III as Mateo
- Michael Vartan as Dylan
- Nicky Whelan as Emma Waverly
- Grant Show as Arthur Waverly
- Faran Tahir as Omar Sandhal
- JR Bourne as Barry

== Episodes ==
=== Series overview ===
| Season | Episodes | Originally released | |
| Season | Episodes | First released | Last released |
|---|---|---|---|
| 1 | 10 | July 17, 2014 | September 18, 2014 |
| 2 | 10 | October 16, 2015 | December 18, 2015 |

=== Season 1 (2014) ===
| No. overall | No. in season | Title | Directed by | Written by | Original release date | US viewers (millions) |
|---|---|---|---|---|---|---|
| 1 | 1 | "Pilot" | Kevin Bray | Sean Jablonski | July 17, 2014 | 1.71 |
Neil Truman is happy with his life and marriage, but he hates his job. On the day he tries to quit, he returns home early and finds his wife Grace having sex with a male escort, Simon. He chases after him when he leaves and Simon tells him she pays for sex because she feels under-appreciated. Neil finds Simon's dropped phone and starts to answer the calls and work as an escort. He is called by Adriana who acts like a regular customer at first, but afterwards offers him a job at her escort service. Victor offers Neil partnership at Bastion.
| 2 | 2 | "...Through Admission" | Michael Smith | Sean Jablonski | July 24, 2014 | 1.59 |
The Zen master texts Grace from Simon's phone to force Neil make a decision about his life. She replies which upsets Neil, but she really wanted to pay off her open bill with Simon and quit. Grace gets back into business as interior designer and asks her sister Stephanie for some help with her inspiration. Simon's car is repossessed when Neil tips off the IRS and his accounts are frozen. In return, Simon steals Neil's car and finds his phone back. He contacts Grace and seduces her. At Bastion, Neil runs into problems with Charles Lipton as his client, and Adriana gets involved. Neil buys Simon's car from the impound and leaves it with Adriana. At the mall, Anika sees Simon in her father's car.
| 3 | 3 | "...Through Competition" | J. Miller Tobin | Jessica Queller | July 31, 2014 | 1.47 |
When Neil asks Simon about the photo that Anika took at the mall, Simon tells him how unhappy Grace is. Neil offers to call off the IRS in return for Simon's insider knowledge on their marriage. But Simon's tax problems are more difficult than Neil initially thought. Grace is frustrated when she is dominated by her much younger boss, but wins the situation when it turns out she was right about the renovation project. At Bastion, Neil solves the accounting for Lipton and his wife. Adriana invites Neil to a masked party where he learns new things about himself. Anika asks her aunt Stephanie for help with her problems with her new friends from school, and they throw a party.
| 4 | 4 | "...Through Self-Discovery" | Jennifer Getzinger | Tracy McMillan | August 7, 2014 | 1.40 |
Anika had an accident in Stephanie's car and Stephanie takes care of her while Grace is busy saving her new career. Because of his financial troubles, Simon asks Adriana for a job. After his rebellion in the airplane, Neil is facing court trials with the flight attendant and with the FBI. He must work on his public image and write an apology speech, but struggles with it and rather takes up an escort job from Adriana. Anika wants Neil to stand up to his principles in the court hearing, but Neil delivers his speech. Grace sees Simon again.
| 5 | 5 | "...Through Partnership" | Mike Listo | Marjorie David | August 14, 2014 | 1.14 |
Anika is invited to an open mic gig, but on the way there, she loses her guitar, and meets Mateo, another musician. Dylan, a photographer, comes to document Grace's finished job on the lobby space, but is interested in her as much as in her design. Bastion is hacked. While he worries they might find incriminating photos of his night job, he discovers evidence that Grace has recently visited Simon. Adriana puts Simon to a test for her services, and finds his connection to Neil's wife. Finally, she hires Grace as interior designer for her house under a confidentiality agreement, as a pretense for getting to know about her and Neil.
| 6 | 6 | "...Through Exposure" | Stephen Gyllenhaal | Peter MacManus | August 21, 2014 | 1.34 |
Mateo returns Anika's guitar and plans to record a song with her. She tries to surprise him with a visit but is disappointed to see him return home with another girl. Dylan uses a photo of Grace as promotional material, and invites Grace and Stephanie to be part of a nude installation. Afterwards, Stephanie asks him out, which disappoints Grace. Adriana sends Neil to escort a woman whose husband is in a wheelchair, telling him it is only for dancing while the client demands sex, but Neil is not comfortable with the situation. While he is out, she pays a surprise visit to Grace at their home to learn more about Neil. In the end, Neil has angy sex with Adriana.
| 7 | 7 | "...Through Terms and Conditions" | Kevin Bray | Shukree Hassan Tilghman | August 28, 2014 | 1.25 |
Adriana sends Simon on a special job for a conjugal visit in prison. Mallory, a previous client of Neil, tries to make contact, but Neil ignores her. Anika and Grace go on a college visit over the weekend, but Neil is too busy with his happiness app and will join them later. Grace's former professor nominates her for a competition for a fellowship in Milan, Italy. Neil finds Dylan's nude photo of Grace and becomes very jealous. He drives to the college and has makeup sex with Grace. Mateo has followed Anika to campus, and they get surprised by her parents in the dorm bedroom. In the end, Neil meets Dylan when they return as he was housesitting with Stephanie.
| 8 | 8 | "...Through Security" | Jann Turner | Jessica Queller & Shukree Hassan Tilghman | September 4, 2014 | 1.11 |
Mallory meets Neil to tell him that her husband found out that she hired an escort. Now Neil suddenly feels as the escort who destroys marriages and because he worries about his safety, he buys a home security system, and tells Adriana he wants to quit. Simon finds out that Grace is working for Adriana. Mateo takes Anika to a music publisher to record a song together, but they do not want her. Stephanie starts a relationship with Dylan and they go on a double date dinner with Grace and Neil. Dylan works with Grace on Adriana's home. Finally, Simon tells Grace that Neil knows about him.
| 9 | 9 | "...Through Revelation" | John Scott | Sean Jablonski | September 11, 2014 | 1.50 |
Simon asks Grace to leave Neil for him. She kicks him out and starts packing her things. Adriana fires Simon for his behavior, but wants to help him with the Trumans, so she tells him that Neil works for her. Mateo and Anika invite his parents to the Trumans', to tell them about their plans to pursue a music career together instead of a college education. However, their plans are in question when they have to find out that there is no money, and Anika is jealous about Tatiana. Grace decides to stay and wants to start couples therapy.
| 10 | 10 | "...Through Resolution" | Michael Smith | Sean Jablonski & Peter MacManus | September 18, 2014 | 1.34 |
Simon is giving away his clients and wants to sell his inherited paintings to run away with Grace, but they are stolen after he offers them to Adriana. Anika finds out about the truth about Tatiana and signs a contract with the music producer, but when she surprises Mateo with it, he is not happy and leaves. At Adriana's place, ready to accept her new job offer, Neil meets her husband who returned from his stay abroad, and leaves. Neil sells his happiness app. Anika uses the money to buy a car to drive to the festival where he will perform. Waiting for the couples therapy, Grace tells Neil she won the fellowship in Italy, and they decide to go there together. Mallory's husband arrives at the Trumans' house with a gun.

=== Season 2 (2015) ===
On October 17, 2015, all episodes of season 2, along with the previous season, were made available for streaming on USA's website, as well as via the On Demand service on many cable systems.

| No. overall | No. in season | Title | Directed by | Written by | Original release date | US viewers (millions) |
|---|---|---|---|---|---|---|
| 11 | 1 | "...Through Release" | Mike Listo | Sean Jablonski | October 16, 2015 | 0.82 |
Mallory's husband is killed in the fight with Neil. Neil confesses everything to Grace, and when Adriana arrives to help with the situation and deal with the police, Grace also learns the truth about her. She runs away to Simon, but when she meets his stepmother Emma at his apartment, she leaves him, too. Neil goes to find Anika at the festival and gives her the college money to follow her dream. Grace extorts some money from Adriana for keeping her business a secret. Simon threatens Adriana about the paintings. With the full truth out for everyone, Neil feels he starts a new life now. Grace ends up at Adriana's house.
| 12 | 2 | "...Through Risk" | Stephen Gyllenhaal | Peter Macmanus | October 23, 2015 | 0.72 |
Neil meets Simon at a party which leads to a spontaneous joint escort job. Later, Simon sends him to another client who Neil finds out to be a blogger. She writes a favorable report on her experience, leading to many new requests. As Neil thinks Simon is a terrible businessman, he takes this opportunity to start a new escort service, which Grace finds out about in the end. Adriana introduces Grace to her business. Simon's stepmother comes to visit to tell him that his father wants the paintings back, and he sleeps with her. He steals the paintings back from Adriana and brings them to his father's house, burning them in front of his eyes. But Simon is what his father really wanted back as he is terminally ill.
| 13 | 3 | "...Through Expansion" | Mike Listo | Tracy McMillan | October 30, 2015 | 0.54 |
Neil is starting up his escort service and asks Simon aboard as partner, but Simon is too busy with his father, who has found out about his son's occupation. Grace tells Adriana about her husband's new venture. Adriana introduces Grace to new pleasures, but Grace is hesitant. Adriana warns Neil about starting another escort service and invites him for a dinner with Grace where she presents them divorce papers, but Neil leaves. He meets with Simon for a double date job, and they decide to work together. Adriana is sad that her husband left. Finally, Adriana brings Grace Neil's signed divorce papers, and they kiss.
| 14 | 4 | "...Through Bondage" | Stephen Gyllenhaal | Adria Lang | November 6, 2015 | 0.69 |
Grace wants to move out from Adriana's after they slept together but is convinced to stay. During the redecorations, she discovers an old bondage room. To explore her new interest, Adriana brings Grace along to an upscale S&M club. Simon asks Neil for help to save his father's estate, which leads to a competition. Adriana tells Neil that Grace signed the divorce papers, which is a lie just as Neil's signature was forged. Grace and Neil find out and pay it back to Adriana. Grace leaves to think it through for herself. Simon still sleeps with Emma, and decides to invest in Neil's escort business.
| 15 | 5 | "...Through Struggle" | Rob Hardy | Rob Fresco | November 13, 2015 | 0.66 |
Adriana has tipped off the SEC about Bastion, which leads to a business battle between Neil and her. But when Neil's partner Victor confides his book falsification practice to him, Neil makes peace with Adriana to call off the SEC and they decide to work as partners. Grace sees a plastic surgeon who takes her out on a date, but they end up at his practice where he tries to change her looks to his liking. Grace runs away and ends up sleeping with Neil. Emma tells Simon she is going with Arthur to Argentina for his treatment, but then she discovers that she might be pregnant from Simon. When Simon talks to the family physician, he finds out that his father is not sick, a fact that is unknown to Emma, too.
| 16 | 6 | "...Through Negotiation" | Cherie Nowlan | Shukree Hassan Tilghman | November 20, 2015 | 0.66 |
Neil got back together with Grace. When Adriana sets him up for a date on her upcoming party, they discuss an open marriage, but eventually Grace switches the escorts so she can go with her husband. Adriana stops the SEC investigations, but Victor will be arrested for cooking the books, which makes Neil angry at her but leaves him in charge of Bastion. Simon find out that his father has paid a doctor for his false diagnosis, but does not know why, until Omar Sandhal breaks into his apartment and tells him now that Arthur is gone, Simon has inherited his debt with Omar. After the party, Anika shows up at Adriana's house.
| 17 | 7 | "...Through Travel" | Silver Tree | Tracy McMillan & Peter Macmanus | November 27, 2015 | 0.49 |
Bastion is losing clients since Victor's arrest. Neil tries to win them back in person and is joined by Grace. Barry, an important client tells them that he recognized Neil at the escort party, and Grace saves the meeting by advertising Bastion's secret and profitable escort business. Simon is questioned by the police about the murder of his father's bodyguard. Now unable to travel officially, he seduces a wealthy former client and to fly to Argentina on her private jet. There, the police tell him that Arthur and Emma are dead. Anika tells Adriana how she lived at Julian's commune, but when she found out that they stole the college/travel money that Neil gave her, she ran away, taking with her Julians's drug stash. Adriana visits him and demands the money back but he says it is gone, so she gives Anika her own money, claiming that she retrieved it from Julian, but under the condition that Anika will not contact him again. However, glad that Julian apparently returned her money, she goes back to him.
| 18 | 8 | "...Through Psychedelics" | Mike Listo | Sean Jablonski & Rob Fresco | December 4, 2015 | 0.61 |
Grace and Neil are looking for Anika and destroy Julian's drug lab. Anika returns but only as a plot to retrieve Julian's drugs from Adriana's house, and Julian takes the contents of her safe, leaving behind drug-spiked incense sticks that get Adriana, Grace, and Neil high. Anika reunites with her parents and announces she has been accepted for a college scholarship. Simon receives the charred bodies of Arthur and Emma. Omar presses to get paid, so Simon asks Neil for tricks to receive his father's heritage quickly. He is very surprised when Arthur calls him, explaining he had faked their accident, and asking for a meeting.
| 19 | 9 | "...Through Family" | Felix Alcala | Adria Lang & Shukree Hassan Tilghman | December 11, 2015 | 0.64 |
Adriana helps Anika prepare for college and considers having children on her own, using her frozen eggs. Barry is still interested in the escort business. Simon meets with Arthur who gives him instructions how to deal with his heritage and Omar. However, Neil, Adriana, and Grace help Simon find out that it is all a big setup and Omar is working with Arthur. When Simon meets Arthur again and Arthur tells him that Emma is dead, Simon kills him.
| 20 | 10 | "...Through New Beginnings" | Mike Listo | Sean Jablonski & Rob Fresco | December 18, 2015 | 0.64 |
Simon is haunted by the murder of his father and confesses to Grace while drunk. Adriana convinces Barry to back out as investor for the new "True Man" escort service, and wants to take over his position herself, but Neil and Grace does not want her. The blogger who wrote the popular article on her night with Neil suggests another investor but only if they can publish a book about Neil and Grace which they turn down, too. Eventually, Simon jumps into the investment as CEO of Waverley Industries. Adriana drugs Neil to collect a sperm sample and have her own child planted into Rosalie as her surrogate.

== Production ==
The series was created by Sean Jablonski, who had served as executive producer alongside Russ Krasnoff. It had been filmed in Atlanta.

Nathan Matthew David composed the music for the series.

== Broadcast ==
Satisfaction premiered in the United States on the USA Network on July 17, 2014, at 10 p.m.

In Australia, the series premiered on June 14, 2015, on Showcase. Although it shared title with the earlier popular Australian series of the same title and also dealt with the topic of escorting, the series is not related to this one in any way.

== Reception ==
The first season scored an 82% approval rating on Rotten Tomatoes, while scoring 63 out of 100 "generally positive" on Metacritic based on 19 reviews.
