= Michelle Page =

American former actress (born 1987)

- Born: January 19, 1987 (age 39); Fort Worth, Texas, U.S.
- Education: Harwood Junior High School
- Occupation: Actress
- Years active: 2004–2019

Michelle Page (born January 19, 1987) is an American actress.

== Early years ==
Born in Fort Worth, Texas on January 19, 1987, Page is the daughter of Tom and Sharon Page. She attended Harwood Junior High School in Bedford, Texas.

== Acting career ==
Page began her career in professional theatre in 1995 as a child actress, starring at age 8 as role of Susan Walker in the Fort Worth Christmas production of Miracle on 34th Street. She first appeared on television in a 2004 episode of Crossing Jordan, followed by her first film role, Miss Congeniality 2: Armed & Fabulous, in 2005.

Over the next 11 years, her film appearances have been primarily direct-to-video, indies and short films, including the movies Kush (2007) and Sublime (2007), along with guest roles in episodes of various television series, including two episodes of Bosch in 2016.

== Filmography ==
Film and Television
Year	Title	Role	Notes
2004	Crossing Jordan	Natasha	Episode: "All the News Fit to Print"
2005	Miss Congeniality 2: Armed and Fabulous	Punk girl in bank	
2005	Single White Female 2: The Psycho	Punk rocker girl	Direct-to-video
2005	CSI: Miami	Kimberly Beaudreux	Episode: "Felony Flight"
2007	Sublime	Ravyn	Direct-to-video
2007	Cold Case	Karen Watson (1964)	Episode: "The Good-Bye Room"
2007	Standoff	Darah Keegan	Episode: "Road Trip"
2007	I Know Who Killed Me	Gabrielle Sherwood	scenes deleted
2007	Kush	Kat	
2008	Bones	Justine Berry	Episode: "Player Under Pressure"
2008	Together Again for the First Time	Kaye Frobisher	Direct-to-video
2008	The Mentalist	Hope	Episode: "Red Tide"
2009	Castle	Amanda	Episode: "Hedge Fund Homeboys"
2009	Dog	Elizabeth 'Lizzie' Hansen	
2009	Ghost Whisperer	Emma Silber	Episode: "Cursed"
2009	Saving Grace	Emily	Episode: "We're Already Here"
2009	Sensored	Tara	
2011	Scraps	Eva	Short film
2011	Rogue River	Mara	also associate producer
2011	The Last Visit	Zoe	Short film
2011	American Disciples	Lacy	also associate producer
2012	16-Love	Kylie	
2013	Strain	Maxine	Short film
2013	15 North	Frances	
2013	American Horror Story: Coven	Young Myrtle Snow	Episode: "Fearful Pranks Ensue"
2013	Watertown	Elizabeth	Short film
2015	The Party is Over	Nia	
2016	Girl Meets World	Mrs. Ducksberry	Episode: "Girl Meets Commonism"
2016	Bosch	Harmony	2 episodes
2019	Tawnee Kendall: Keep the Rain	Lacy	Music video – via footage from American Brothers
2019	American Brothers	Lacy	also associate producer
