= Jack Krizmanich =

American actor

- Born: December 16, 1978 (age 47); Phoenixville, Pennsylvania, U.S.
- Occupation: Actor
- Years active: 2001–present

Jack Krizmanich (born December 16, 1978) is an American actor and model. He played Aaron Spencer on the MyNetworkTV serial Wicked Wicked Games. His previous acting credits include Passions, What I Like About You, Ludis on True Blood and the film Shadowboxer.

Krizmanich was born in the small town of Phoenixville, Pennsylvania, just outside Philadelphia. While working at a restaurant in high school, Jack was discovered by an agent at IMAGE Models.

== Filmography ==
=== Film ===
Year	Title	Role	Notes
2005	Shadowboxer	Tommy	
2011	The Sitter	Ricky Fontaine	
2016	The Living	Paul	

=== Television ===
Year	Title	Role	Notes
2001–2004	Passions	John Hastings	282 episodes
2004	What I Like About You	Naked Bellman	Episode: "Ghost of a Chance"
2006–2007	Wicked Wicked Games	Aaron Spencer	60 episodes
2009	True Blood	Ludis	2 episodes
2009	CSI: NY	Martin Stafford	Episode: "It Happened to Me"
2013	Parks and Recreation	Gregg	Episode: "Emergency Response"
2015	Salem Rogers	Johnny	Television film
2017	Bromance	Sean	Television film
2017	The Haunted	Ben Tolbert	Television film
2018	Disillusioned	Mike	Television film
2019	The Ex Next Door	Finn	Television film
