= Skid Marks (film) =

2007 film by Karl Kozak

- Theatrical release Poster
- Directed by: Karl Kozak
- Written by: Karl Kozak; Don J. Rearden; Kraig Wenman
- Produced by: Karl Kozak; Bill Bragg; Thomas A. Seitz
- Starring: Tyler Poelle; Mikey Post; Scott Dittman; Les Jennings; Kathy Uyen; Dianna Agron; James Piper; David Schultz
- Cinematography: Scott Peck
- Edited by: Jeff Murphy; Joe Richardson
- Music by: Larry Groupé
- Production company: Diversa Films
- Release date: October 5, 2007 (San Diego)
- Running time: 85 minutes
- Country: United States
- Language: English
- Budget: $5 million

Skid Marks is a 2007 independent comedy film about two rival ambulance companies and their attempts to maintain themselves in their city, directed by Karl Kozak and written by Kozak, Don J. Rearden and Kraig Wenman. The film had its theatrical premiere on October 5, 2007, in San Diego, and in 2008, screened at the Dances With Films Festival in Los Angeles.

== Premise ==
Budget cuts force two rival ambulance companies and their misfit medics to go head-to-head to save their patients, their jobs and their beer money, all in the name of emergency medicine.

== Cast ==
- Tyler Poelle as Rich
- Mikey Post as Louis "One Foot" Jones
- Scott Dittman as Karl / The Human Stain
- Les Jennings as T-Bone
- Kathy Uyen as Lai Mei
- James Piper as Bob "The Brain" (as Tim Piper)
- David Schultz as Neil
- Dianna Agron as Megan
- Chuck Kelley as Sarge
- Larrs Jackson as Captain Limison
- J.R. Nutt as Leonard
- Matthew Wolf as Jacques

== Production ==
Filming took place over a six-week period during June and July 2006 at locations in San Diego, California, in areas including Kearny Mesa, Point Loma, Hillcrest, uptown San Diego and several beach areas.

== Reception ==
Scott Rosenberg previewed the film in Monsters & Critics. Upon release, the San Diego Union-Tribune wrote that the film's world premiere in San Diego "packed a full house."

North County Times wrote that the film looks to "place itself somewhere near the company of such comic legacies as Animal House and Caddyshack," but offered that such may not happen as fans of such films "rarely allow comparisons." The review noted that the film was directed with "visual flair and good instincts," and performed "with an admirable lack of humility."

In commenting on the home video release of Skid Marks, DVD Verdict called the film a "cheap-'n'-cheesy low-ball, gross-out comedy", and wrote that the two rival companies names, Bayside Ambulatory Life Services and Downtown Intensive Care create acronyms that clue viewers to the general tone of the film and most of its humor. They felt that it was an unremarkable indie film that was "frequently funny" but more often "frequently stupid," seeming to be aimed at a junior high school audience. They offered that the DVD release was decent and its image "reasonably good given the $1.98-style budget", and that "the producers don't try to obviously fake things to make it all look higher level than it is."
