= That Still Small Voice =

- Once Upon a Time episode
- Episode no.: Season 1 Episode 5
- Directed by: Paul Edwards
- Written by: Jane Espenson
- Original air date: November 27, 2011

Guest appearances
- Tony Amendola as Marco; Anastasia Griffith as Kathryn Nolan; Harry Groener as Martin; Carolyn Hennesy as Myrna; Meghan Ory as Ruby; Keegan Connor Tracy as The Blue Fairy; Laura Bertram as Donna (co-star); Luke Camilleri as Stephen (co-star); Jarod Joseph as Billy (co-star); Michael Strusievici as child Gepetto/Little Fairy Tale Boy (co-star); Adam Young as child Jiminy (co-star)

Episode chronology
← Previous "The Price of Gold"	Next → "The Shepherd"
- Once Upon a Time season 1

"That Still Small Voice" is the fifth episode of the American fairy tale/drama television series Once Upon a Time. The series takes place in the fictional seaside town of Storybrooke, Maine, in which the residents are actually characters from various fairy tales that were transported to the "real world" town by a powerful curse. In this episode, Henry (Jared S. Gilmore) becomes upset when told by Archie (Raphael Sbarge) that his fairy tale theories are delusions; Henry places himself in danger when he investigates a mysterious sinkhole, forcing a regretful Archie to save him. Meanwhile, the backstory of Jiminy Cricket (Sbarge) is revealed – he yearns to leave his con artist parents and become a good person, but accidentally hurts an innocent couple along the way.

It was the first Once Upon a Time episode to be written by consulting producer Jane Espenson, while being directed by Paul Edwards. Espenson was "thrilled" to be assigned the episode; Jiminy Cricket was typically a character that appeared in other people's stories, so she was eager to explore him in his own narrative. Espenson especially wanted to depict how some, like Jiminy in this episode, "have their adolescence well after adolescence. It took Jiminy a long time to figure out how to get away from the life he was living, and I think a lot of people feel like that." In addition, the episode contained several cultural references to the television series Lost and the Disney film One Hundred and One Dalmatians.

"That Still Small Voice" first aired in the United States on November 27, 2011, with the network ABC. An estimated 10.7 million viewers watched the episode, helping it finish in third place for its timeslot. "That Still Small Voice" finished in fourteenth place for the week among the major networks. Since then, it has garnered generally positive critical reviews. Many praised Espenson's screenwriting, as well as Jiminy's characterization and the performances of Sbarge and Robert Carlyle.

== Title card ==
A spinning wheel stands in the Enchanted Forest.

== Plot ==
=== In the characters' past ===
In the Enchanted Forest, a young pickpocket named Jiminy desires the chance to be a good person, but is forced by his father (Harry Groener) and mother (Carolyn Hennesy) to participate in their cons. After he finishes collecting some stolen goods, Jiminy tells them that he desires to leave the family business. Unfortunately, as years go by, the now-adult Jiminy (Raphael Sbarge) is still aiding his parents, who come up with excuses to keep him from leaving. He runs into a young boy who tells him to follow his conscience. One night, Jiminy pays a visit to see Rumpelstiltskin (Robert Carlyle) and is given a tonic that will set him free from his parents and is told to either have them drink it or throw it over them.

Later that evening, Jiminy and his parents convince a couple to give up some goods in exchange for a tonic that will supposedly make them immune to a plague. He soon discovers that his father switched Rumpelstiltskin's tonic with the one they sold, and finds that the couple have been turned into dolls. Even worse, he then discovers that the couple were the parents of the young boy he spoke to earlier. Having realized what he has done, Jiminy makes a wish and receives an answer from The Blue Fairy, who shows up to give him his one true wish: becoming a cricket. Jiminy is also told that he has a chance to help someone in the future, starting with the young boy, who would grow up to be Gepetto. As for the cursed dolls, they end up as a collection at Mr. Gold's (Carlyle) pawn shop.

=== In Storybrooke ===
In the present day, Dr. Archie Hopper (Sbarge) continues to evaluate Henry (Jared S. Gilmore), who is still trying to convince him that he is Jiminy. Meanwhile, Sheriff Graham (Jamie Dornan) officially makes Emma Swan (Jennifer Morrison) his new deputy. An explosion soon after causes the town to shake, followed by a sinkhole that emerges at an abandoned mine shaft. As Emma, Henry, Archie, and the sheriff show up to see the damaged area, Regina (Lana Parrilla) arrives to try to keep everyone from going any further, then comes across a certain object which looks like an ornate piece of glass and puts it in her pocket. She is also not pleased with the sheriff hiring Emma, and also reminds Archie that she can have him fired and out on the streets if he fails to succeed in dissuading Henry of the veracity of the fairy tale stories.

The next day, Archie follows through on Regina's warning by convincing Henry that the fairy tale stories are not real, upsetting Henry. This prompts Emma to pay a visit to Archie as she figures out that Regina was responsible for threatening him. Emma accuses Regina of threatening Archie, but Regina says that Henry is missing again. Archie conjectures that Henry may have gone back to the mine shaft. There, Henry begins to investigate the area and comes across a glass item similar to the one Regina found earlier that he puts into his backpack. Archie goes in to search for Henry and finds the boy, but as they try to escape, an aftershock blocks off the main entrance, leaving an injured Archie and Henry trapped. They find an elevator shaft, not knowing that above ground Emma and Regina have taken the suggestion of blasting the main entrance from Marco (Tony Amendola), which results in the elevator carrying Henry and Archie being lowered even further after the blast takes place.

Inside the elevator, Henry asks Archie why he refuses to believe that he is Jiminy Cricket. Archie acknowledges that he might share Jiminy's personality and in a similar fashion to his alternative past, yearn to be free from being told what to do. Meanwhile, above ground, Emma finds the opening of the elevator shaft and volunteers to go down the shaft, where she succeeds in rescuing Henry and Archie. Archie tells Regina that he will continue to see Henry and that if she attempts to interfere he will take action against Regina and have her declared an unfit mother. Regina backs down after Archie's threat, she looks at the object she had in her pocket and throws it down the shaft, where it is revealed that it is a small shard of the infamous glass coffin of Snow White's (Ginnifer Goodwin).

Concurrent with these events, Mary Margaret (Goodwin) continues to visit the amnesiac David (Joshua Dallas) at the hospital. At the same time, Kathryn (Anastasia Griffith) also continues to visit David, showing him pictures to jog his memory but later admits to Mary Margaret that he doesn't remember anything that he saw in the pictures, although he claimed otherwise when talking with Kathryn. As Mary Margaret notices David becoming more attracted to her, she still feels threatened by Kathryn's presence. This prompts Mary Margaret to submit her letter of resignation as a volunteer at the hospital.

== Production and cultural references ==
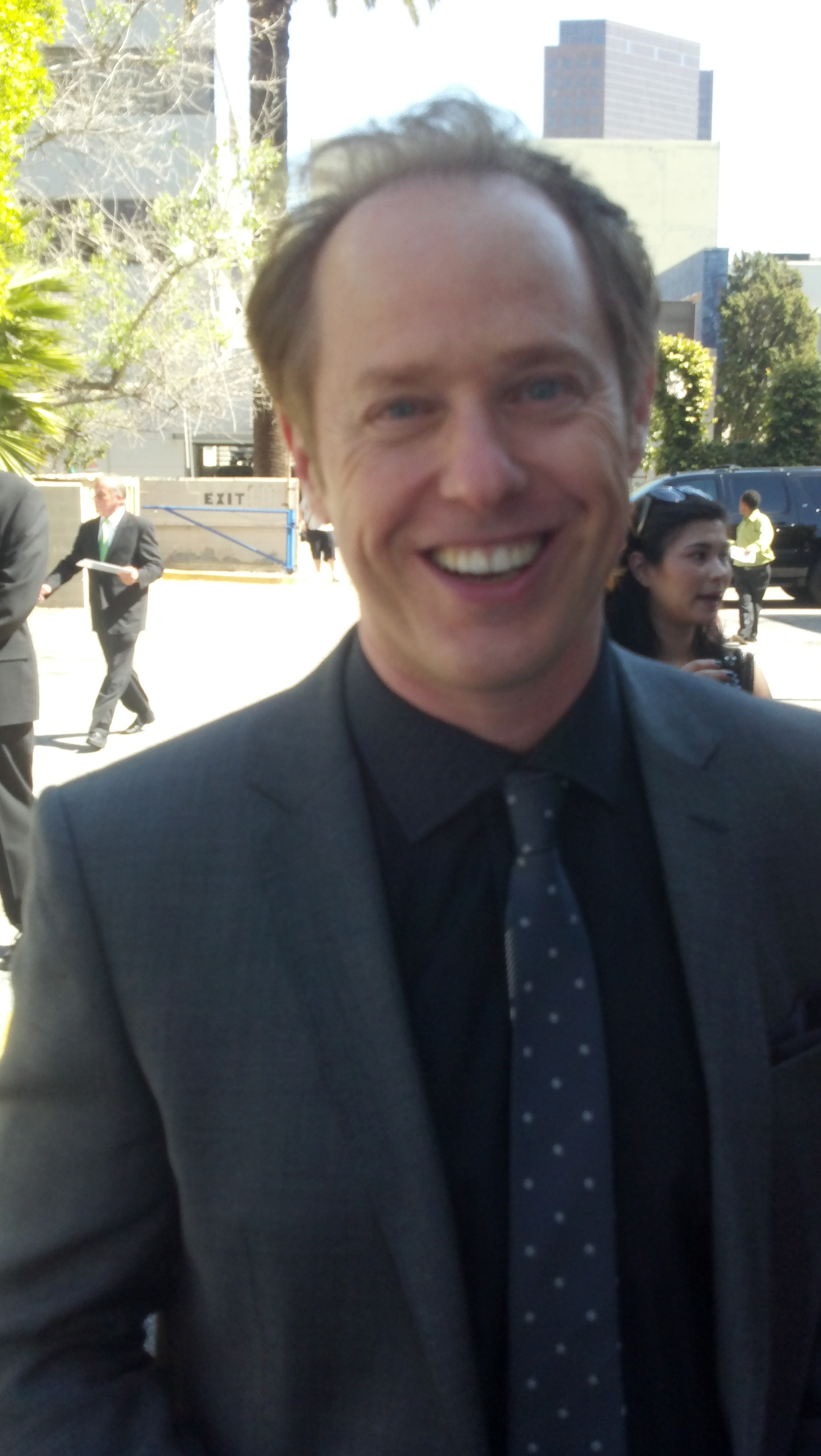
The episode featured Jiminy Cricket (played by Raphael Sbarge)

"That Still Small Voice" was the first Once Upon a Time episode written by consulting producer Jane Espenson. She was drawn to join the series because she believed a curse involving fairy tale characters was a "fantastic concept". She explained, "What's the modern take on Jiminy Cricket and Rumpelstiltskin? What would their issues be in the real world? The beauty of the production, the care and the effort and, honestly, the expense that was put into it just made clear that was a project done with a lot of attention and love." The episode was directed by Lost veteran Paul Edwards. "That Still Small Voice", featuring Jiminy Cricket, was assigned to Espenson, and she was "thrilled to get it," as she wanted to explore the character in his own story. She elaborated that Jiminy is

Someone who you might think of as being part of someone else’s story – even in Pinocchio, he’s all about someone else’s arc. I like taking that character and reminding us all that everyone is the hero of their own story. I related to him because of that, and also because it was such an identifiable story — the way so many people have their adolescence well after adolescence. It took Jiminy a long time to figure out how to get away from the life he was living, and I think a lot of people feel like that.

Actor Raphael Sbarge became attracted to join the series because he would effectively be helping tell two stories, one in a fantasy world and the other in a modern setting. In an interview with The Hollywood Reporter, Sbarge compared Once Upon a Time to the television series Lost "in that they have a large ensemble and what they do is that they take a few characters and they kind of take them, effectively on a deep dive." When Sbarge read the script for "That Still Small Voice", he was worried about "treading into people's imaginations," but ultimately decided that "they cast me for a reason because there are some qualities in me that they obviously recognize for the story they want to tell."

Believing that his character was "sort of a surrogate father figure" to Henry, Sbarge admitted that the script "made me weep because what they came up with is so lovely and magical and delightful." Referring to his character's storyline as a hero's journey, Sbarge said the intention was to show that Jiminy Cricket did not just begin as a noble guy – "what you get to see on this trip are the fire rings he had to walk through to get to a place where he could evolve to develop a sense of doing the right thing." The episode featured guest stars Harry Groener and Carolyn Hennesy as Jiminy's parents Martin and Myrna. Groener had previously worked with Espenson in the third season of the fantasy television series Buffy the Vampire Slayer. It is their only appearances in the series.

The episode contains several cultural references and allusions. The scenes in which Henry was carrying a couple of Apollo Chocolate Candy Bars in his back pack was also the same brand of candy bars made by the DHARMA Initiative on Lost, while Archie's pet Pongo is also the name of one of the dogs in the Disney film One Hundred and One Dalmatians.

The episode's title, "That Still Small Voice", is an apparent allusion, or reference to a Biblical passage in the Books of Kings: "but the Lord was not in the fire: and after the fire a still small voice." (Note: The passage, from 1 Kings 19:11-13 (King James Version), reads:^{11} "And he said, Go forth, and stand upon the mount before the Lord. And, behold, the Lord passed by, and a great and strong wind rent the mountains, and brake in pieces the rocks before the Lord; but the Lord was not in the wind: and after the wind an earthquake; but the Lord was not in the earthquake:^{12} "And after the earthquake a fire; but the Lord was not in the fire: and after the fire a still small voice.^{13} "And it was so, when Elijah heard it, that he wrapped his face in his mantle, and went out, and stood in the entering in of the cave. And, behold, there came a voice unto him, and said, What doest thou here, Elijah?" (The word "still", as used in the passage, should be read in terms of both of its modern meanings: "not moving or making a sound", and "even yet"; and in its older, more archaic usage, as meaning: "always".))

== Reception ==
=== Ratings ===
The episode first aired on November 27, 2011. It earned a ratings share of 3.4/8 among 18- to 49-year-olds and scored a 5.9/8 ratings share overall. An estimated 10.7 million watched the episode, and it ranked third in its timeslot behind Football Night In America on NBC and 60 Minutes on CBS but ahead of The Simpsons on the Fox network. The episode ultimately finished in fourteenth place for the week among the major networks. In Canada, the episode finished in twenty-second place for the week, garnering an estimated 1.43 million viewers, a decrease from the 1.59 million of the previous episode.

=== Reviews ===
The episode was met with generally positive reviews.

Writing for AOL TV, Laura Prudom noted that the episode "proved to be an undeniably satisfying hour of television, deepening our understanding of Archie/Jiminy's character and giving us some welcome development in Mary Margaret and David's tragic romance. I don't know about you, but I really could watch a whole hour of those two playing hangman and innocently flirting and need nothing else from the show." Entertainment Weekly columnist Shaunna Murphy wrote that while she "ragged on Robert Carlyle initially, his campy Rumpel is quickly becoming one of my favorite parts of this show." Tor.com's Teresa Jusino called Espenson's script "so engaging" because it deviated from the series' typical two-story format and "incorporated a third, separate modern storyline" that featured other characters in addition to Jiminy Cricket, in which "each storyline got just enough attention." She added that the episode's best parts were its "intimate character moments, particularly the scenes between Archie/Jiminy and the boys in his life," and attributed this to Espenson's strength as a writer. Jusino felt another highlight was Sbarge's performance, as he "navigated both Archie and Jiminy’s journeys from being pawns to being their own men with precision and warmth."

Oliver Sava of The A.V. Club graded the episode with a C. He criticized Gilmore's performance in "That Still Small Voice" and earlier episodes, writing that "Gilmore struggles to make a connection with his character, so it always looks like he’s reading lines," which might have a negative effect on Henry's character development. Sava felt that Espenson, based on her previous work, was good at balancing large casts and wrote "this episode juggles the expansive character roster of this series better than its predecessors." Conversely, IGN's Amy Ratcliffe said she has "never liked Henry as much as I did in this episode," especially his explanation to Archie on why he is Jiminy Cricket. Ratcliffe added that Jiminy had the "most touching backstory" of the season up to that point, opining that "the transformation of Dr. Hopper was moving, and this episode maybe felt the most like a fairytale of the stories we've seen so far." She graded "That Still Small Voice" with 8 out of 10, an indication of a "great" episode.

== Cast ==
=== Starring ===
- Ginnifer Goodwin as Mary Margaret Blanchard
- Jennifer Morrison as Emma Swan
- Lana Parrilla as Regina Mills
- Josh Dallas as Prince Charming
- Jared S. Gilmore as Henry Mills
- Raphael Sbarge as Jiminy Cricket/Archie Hopper
- Jamie Dornan as Sheriff Graham
- Robert Carlyle as Rumplestiltskin/Mr. Gold

=== Guest Starring ===
- Tony Amendola as Marco
- Anastasia Griffith as Kathryn Nolan
- Harry Groener as Martin
- Carolyn Hennesy as Myrna
- Meghan Ory as Ruby
- Keegan Connor Tracy as Blue Fairy

=== Co-Starring ===
- Laura Bertram as Donna
- Luke Camilleri as Stephen
- Jarod Joseph as Billy
- Michael Strusievici as Little Fairy Tale Boy
- Adam Young as Pickpocket Boy/Child Jiminy

=== Uncredited ===
- Cinder as Pongo
