= Deanna Russo =

American television actress

- Born: October 17, 1979 (age 47); New Jersey, U.S.
- Occupation: Actress
- Years active: 2001–present
- Spouse: Michael Cassady (m. 2014; div. 2020)
- Children: 1
- Website: www.deannarusso.com

Deanna Russo (born October 17, 1979) is an American actress. She is known for her starring roles on the 2008 NBC version of Knight Rider and the 2014 USA Network television series Satisfaction.

== Career ==
In 2003, she made her television debut in an episode of Charmed, and later guest starred on CSI: Crime Scene Investigation, CSI: NY, How I Met Your Mother, and NCIS. In 2007, she had a recurring role as Dr. Logan Armstrong on the CBS soap opera, The Young and the Restless.

In 2007, Russo won Best Director for her short, Taste of Kream, in the New Orleans Film Festival.

Russo starred in the NBC television movie (and backdoor pilot) Knight Rider as Sarah Graiman, the daughter of KITT's creator, Dr. Charles Graiman, and the childhood love of KITT's driver, Michael Traceur. From 2008 to 2009 she starred on the short-lived followup Knight Rider television series. She later had recurring roles on Gossip Girl, Rescue Me, Burning Love, and Being Human.

In 2014 she began starring in the USA Network drama series, Satisfaction. She also appeared in the twelfth season of Two and a Half Men. In 2016, Russo appeared in the comedy film Jimmy Vestvood: Amerikan Hero.

== Life ==
Russo was born in New Jersey. She began her career as a local theatre actress, before acting on television and independent films. She briefly modeled for two years.

Russo was married to Michael Cassady and gave birth to their first child, a daughter, in June 2015.

In recent years she has been vocal about her queerness and according to social media is in a relationship with Chef Jamie Lauren, previously of Top Chef fame.

== Selected filmography ==
Film and television roles
Year	Title	Role	Notes
1992	Porco Rosso		Voice; 2005 Disney dub
1995	Whisper of the Heart	High School Students	Voice
2000	Noah Knows Best	Club Kid	
2001	Virgins	Whitney's Friend	
2003	Charmed	Eve	Episode: "Centennial Charmed"
2003	Dirt on Leaves	Allison	
2005	CSI: Crime Scene Investigation	Lori Kyman	Episode: "Unbearable"
2006	CSI: NY	Laura Jeffries	Episode: "Stealing Home"
2006	In Memory of Rusty	Selena Von Carmen	
2006	Rest Stop	Tracy Kress	Straight-to-video film
2007	Believers	Rebecca	Straight-to-video film
2007	The Young and the Restless	Dr. Logan Armstrong	Recurring role, 23 episodes
2007	How I Met Your Mother	Brooke Bartholomay	Episode: "Little Boys"
2007	NCIS	Ashley	Episode: "Leap of Faith"
2008	Ghost Voyage	Serena	Television movie (Sci Fi Channel)
2008	Knight Rider	Sarah Graiman	Television movie (NBC)
2008–09	Knight Rider	Sarah Graiman	Main role, 17 episodes
2009	American Contestant with Bob Odenkirk		TV shorts
2009	White Collar	Taryn Vandersant	Episode: "The Portrait"
2009–10	Gossip Girl	K.C. Cunningham	4 episodes
2009	Tramps and Ramblers	Riley	TV movie
2010	Rescue Me	Penny Rubano	4 episodes
2011	Goodnight Burbank	Nerys	
2011	Mary Horror	Kristen Reynolds	1 episode,2011
2012	Wolfpack of Reseda	Sophie	5 episodes,2012
2012	Do No Harm	Emily Edmonds	Television movie
2012–13	Burning Love	Tamara G.	Recurring role, 12 episodes
2013	Newsreaders	Vanessa Taylor	1 episode,2013
2013–14	Being Human	Kat Neely	Recurring role, 14 episodes
2014	Satisfaction	Stephanie	Main role (season 1), 10 episodes
2014	Do Not Push	Talia	Voice
2014–15	Two and a Half Men	Laurel	3 episodes
2015	Comedy Bang! Bang!	FBI Agent	Episode: "Maya Rudolph Wears a Black Skirt & Strappy Sandals"
2015	The League	Brittany Barber	Episode: "The Yank Banker"
2016	Jimmy Vestvood: Amerikan Hero	Marcy Monroe	Film
2016	Bajillion Dollar Propertie$	Cindy Roost	Episode: "Baxter's Confession"
2017	Powerless	Crimson Fox	Episode: "Cold Season"
2017	The Ice Cream Truck	Mary	Film
2017	Day Six	Jess Mitchell	Film
2017	Crossing		Short
