= Believers (film) =

2007 film directed by Daniel Myrick

- DVD cover
- Directed by: Daniel Myrick
- Written by: Julia Fair; Daniel Myrick; Daniel Noah
- Produced by: Tony Krantz; Daniel Myrick; Shawn Papazian
- Starring: Johnny Messner; Jon Huertas; Deanna Russo
- Cinematography: Andrew Huebscher
- Edited by: Robert Florio
- Music by: Kays Al-Atrakchi
- Production company: Raw Feed
- Distributed by: Warner Home Video
- Release dates: June 11, 2007 (United Kingdom); October 16, 2007 (United States)
- Running time: 102 minutes
- Country: United States
- Language: English

Believers is a 2007 thriller film directed by Daniel Myrick and written by Myrick, Julia Fair and Daniel Noah. The film was distributed by Warner Bros. as a straight-to-DVD release in the United States and elsewhere.

== Plot ==
While on duty, two paramedics, David Vaughn and Victor Hernandez, receive a call from a young girl named Libby, whose mother has lost consciousness in a deserted area. However, when they arrive there they are captured by members of a cult called the Quanta Group.

The two men discover that the Quanta Group is composed of scientists, philosophers and mathematicians and led by a man who calls himself "The Teacher". The Quanta Group believes that the end of the world is coming soon and is preparing for a mass suicide. While Victor is seduced by the group, David must try to escape and save his friend before it is too late.

== Cast ==
- Johnny Messner as David Vaughn
- Jon Huertas as Victor Hernandez
- Deanna Russo as Rebecca
- Saige Ryan Campbell as Libby
- Elizabeth Bogush as Deborah
- Erik Passoja as Io
- Dig Wayne as Captain Edward Newsome
- John Wesley as The Leader
- Christopher May as Gas Station Attendant
- Carolyn Hennesy as Lina Vance
- Daniel Benzali as The Teacher
- June Angela as Mara
- John Farley as Glasses
- Ciara Bravo as Jade
