= Mikey Post =

American actor (1982–2018)

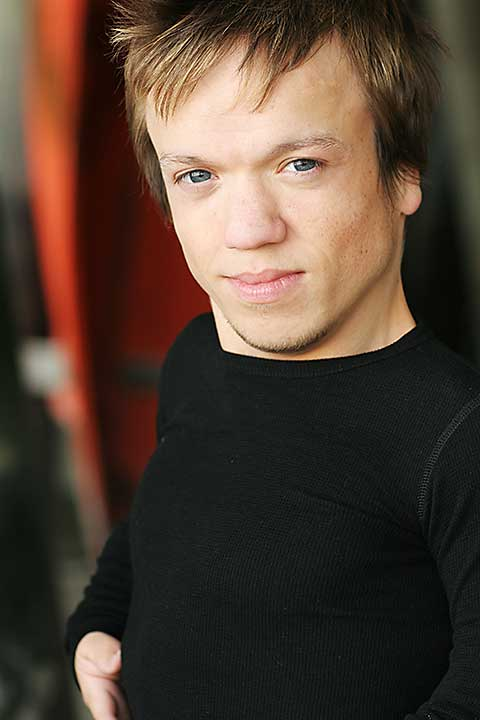
- Born: April 29, 1982; Columbus, Ohio, U.S.
- Died: February 17, 2018 (aged 35)
- Occupation: Actor
- Years active: 2001–2018
- Height: 3 ft 2 in (97 cm)

Mikey Post (April 29, 1982 – February 17, 2018) was an American actor. He had dwarfism and was three feet two inches tall.

He appeared in the films Black Knight, Rest Stop, Rest Stop 2, Killer Pad, Skid Marks, Bedtime Stories, TV shows MADtv, Boardwalk Empire, 90210 and on Animal Planet's Reality Show Pit Boss. He also played a recurring character on Disney XD's Pair of Kings.

== Biography ==
Mikey Post was born in Columbus, Ohio, but soon after his birth he and his family moved to Roswell, Georgia, where he lived for most of his life. He attended a Performing Arts School North Springs High School, studying different acting techniques and performing in numerous plays. After high school, he attended the University of Georgia (UGA) and received his bachelor's degree in Management Information Systems Technology. In 2013, Mikey announced via his Facebook fan page that he was struggling with his health after being diagnosed with amyotrophic lateral sclerosis (ALS).

== Career ==
While attending UGA, Mikey auditioned for commercials and movies in between his studies. Through his Atlanta-based talent agent, The People Store, Mikey booked a minor role in the movie Black Knight. While the role Mikey auditioned for was only a bit part, Martin Lawrence and the director Gil Junger decided they wanted to feature Mikey more throughout the film. Although the role was a small one, it helped jumpstart Mikey's career. After graduating college, Mikey moved to Hollywood, California. Mikey later appeared in various feature films and also played the role of Wicket for the Star Wars nationwide tour in 2006 and in the Rose Parade on New Year's Day 2007. He was most recently seen in national commercials for Radio Shack (as Gumdrop the elf), Big Lots (as the Big Lots Spokes Elf), and Go Daddy. He most notably appeared in the movie Bedtime Stories, starring Adam Sandler & Keri Russell, where he played the Angry Dwarf.

== Death ==
Post died on February 17, 2018, at the age of 35. His cause of death was amyotrophic lateral sclerosis. He was buried after a funeral service.

== Filmography ==
=== Film ===
Year	Title	Role	Notes
2001	Black Knight	Young Man	as Michael Post
2002	Blood Bath	Minion	
2004	Delivery Boy Chronicles	Little Person #2	
2006	Rest Stop	Scotty	
2006	Coming to Town	Alpinlo	
2006	Factory Girl	Associate Producer	as Michael Post
2007	Skid Marks	One-Foot	
2008	Killer Pad	Tito	as Timothy Michael Post
2008	Rest Stop: Don't Look Back	Scotty	
2008	Fairy Tale Police	Mr. Keebler	
2008	Bedtime Stories	Angry Dwarf	
2009	Donna on Demand	Nerd #1	
2009	Santa Buddies	Elpert	
2009	Byron Phillips: Found	Franklin	
2009	A Fuchsia Elephant	Mikey	
2010	The Search for Santa Paws	Elpert Elf	
2010	Playing with Guns	Jonah	TV movie
2011	Intervention: Cinderella	Grumpy	
2012	Santa Paws 2: The Santa Pups	Elpert Elf	
2012	It Has Begun: Bananapocalypse	Himself	
2013	Whistle While I Work It	VIP Guy	
2013	A Country Christmas	Elliot	
2014	Buttwhistle	Cosmo	
2017	Walk of Fame	Teddy	Final film role

=== Television ===
Year	Title	Role	Notes
2007	Tim and Eric Awesome Show, Great Job!	Caged Mutant	1 episode
2010	Majority Rules!	Charles	1 episode
2010	Boardwalk Empire	Mike Green	1 episode
2010	90210	Slick Elf	1 episode
2011	The Cape	Pickle	1 episode
2011–2012	Pair of Kings	Sherpa Squonk/Dr. Micah/Sherpa Squonk's Twin	5 episodes
2012–2013	Pit Boss	Himself	8 episodes
