= Walk of Fame (film) =

2017 comedy film

Walk of Fame is a 2017 comedy film. It premiered on March 24, 2017 and stars Scott Eastwood, Laura Ashley Samuels and Malcolm McDowell.

== Plot ==
Drew signs up for an acting class at the famous Star Academy in Hollywood after falling for aspiring actress Nikki. He gets more than he bargained for when he encounters an eccentric and volatile acting coach and the cast of crazy characters looking for their big break in Tinsel Town. Can Drew survive the insanity of the Star Academy and win Nikki's heart?

== Cast ==
- Scott Eastwood as Drew
- Chris Kattan as Alejandro
- Laura Ashley Samuels as Nikki
- Malcolm McDowell as Evan Polus
- Jamie Kennedy as Hugo
- Cory Hardrict as Nate
- Sam Lerner as Rowe
- Mikey Post as Teddy

== Reception ==
The film was poorly received by critics. Kimber Myers of the Los Angeles Times stated: "Aggressive and aggressively unfunny, Hollywood-set comedy "Walk of Fame" hates its characters and its audience - and the feeling is mutual."
