= Skyman (film) =

2019 film directed by Daniel Myrick

- Official release poster
- Directed by: Daniel Myrick
- Written by: Daniel Myrick
- Produced by: Daniel Myrick; Joseph Restaino; Anthony Pernicka; William Surgeon; Kristian Krempel
- Cinematography: Daniel Myrick; Kevin Burke
- Edited by: Daniel Myrick
- Music by: Billy Corgan; Don Miggs; Greg Hansen
- Production companies: Daniel Myrick Films; Red Arrow Studios; Hungry Bull Productions
- Distributed by: Gravitas Ventures
- Release dates: October 27, 2019 (Austin); June 30, 2020 (United States drive-in theaters release)
- Running time: 92 minutes
- Country: United States
- Language: English

Skyman is a 2019 American science fiction-found footage horror film written and directed by Daniel Myrick. Inspired by memories from his childhood and interest in supernatural events, Myrick wrote the premise to be a "character study" comparable to the real-world psychological trauma and life-long experiences of alien abductees.

In interviews leading up to the film's release Myrick stated, "This isn't Dan trying to do another found footage horror film. This is its own thing." The film was met with an overall mixed critical reception, while praise was directed at the actors, and realistic portrayal of letting go of the past.

== Premise ==
The story of Carl Merryweather, a man who is famous in his local town as someone who believes he experienced an alien encounter at 10-years-old, is explored. Now thirty years later, he is convinced that the extraterrestrials will reconnect with him on his 40th birthday. Merryweather, who is obsessive with making contact with UFOs, attempts to do so at the same location of his previous interaction. His skeptical sister Gina agrees to go with him for support, while bringing a film crew to document the event.

== Cast ==
- Michael Selle as Carl Merryweather
  - Jack Sandler as young Carl Merryweather
- Nicolette Sweeney as Gina Merryweather
- Faleolo Alailima as Marcus Florio
- Michele Yeager as Vanessa, the news anchorwoman
- Paul Wilson as Timothy, the news anchorman
- Willow Hale as Mrs. Cummings
- Lee Broda as Nurse Mary
- Dominic Medina as sound guy
- Avery Guerrera as abductee

== Production ==
=== Development ===
Based on his interest and fascination in science fiction-based activity from his childhood, Myrick wrote the script as a character-study story after researching the topic of the film. Myrick studied real-world self-proclaimed alien abductees Barney and Betty Hill, as well as read books detailing abduction by extraterrestrials including Messengers and Communion. Developed and marketed as the first new film directed by Myrick in years, and drawing attention to his co-directorship on The Blair Witch Project (1999), the low-budget project garnered some significant media attention. A joint-venture production between Daniel Myrick Films, Red Arrow Studios, and Hungry Bull Productions; Gravitas Ventures purchased distribution rights of the indie faux-documentary following its debut at the 2019 Austin Film Festival.

=== Casting ===
Unknown actors were cast in the roles, in an effort for perceived realism, with Emily Schweber serving as Casting Director.

=== Filming ===
The project was filmed in as a documentary film-styled found footage film. This filming style was chosen after consideration over traditional photography, by the filmmaker, as he felt like it gave him and the actors creative freedom with improvisational flexibility. The intent by creatives involved was to keep the budget small, while Myrick stated "I really think it was the best way to tell this story in and of itself, and I hope people embrace that about it."

Dan Myrick served as co-cinematographer, alongside Kevin Burke.

== Release ==
The film premiered at the 2019 Austin Film Festival, after which distribution rights were purchased by Gravitas Ventures. The film released as a drive-in theater exclusive on June 30, 2020. Myrick expressed his excitement in doing so, stating "You're literally under the stars. It doesn't get any better than that...It's just a great movie to see under the stars and that's the big thing for me. You get to look right up at the very constellations that Carl is contemplating." Skyman had a direct-to-video VOD release on July 7, 2020.

== Reception ==
On Rotten Tomatoes the film has an approval rating of 63% based on reviews from 16 critics. The film was met with a mixed reception, with critiques targeting the pacing, as well as the "exhausted" sub-genre in horror, stating that it does not reach "the spooky heights to which it aspires"; while praising the realistic and "touching" story of an "all-too-real examination of the way a single childhood incident can infect an entire life".
