= Color Me Olsen =

2007 short film

Color Me Olsen is an 18-minute 2007 short independent film directed and written by Darren Stein. It was produced by Bryan Singer.

== Plot ==
Bright-eyed 18-year-old identical twin brothers come to Hollywood with the age-old dream of becoming stars. When they see the performers in front of the world-famous Grauman's Chinese Theatre impersonating Superman, Dorothy and the Pirate Johnny, they think this could be their big break. Crossing the gender divide, they take on the roles of mega-famous twin sisters Mary-Kate and Ashley Olsen, losing themselves in their "roles" of the tween superstars, until their fabricated personas threaten to overtake their own identities forever.

== Reviews ==
After its showing at the Tribeca Film Festival, reviewer Daniel Montgomery characterized the film as "ugly, depressing and vicious," asking "Why would anyone write this, direct it, star in it, or watch it? It’s reprehensible and should be punishable by heavy fines and jail time. Grade: F."

In contrast, online reviewer Scott Hoffman found the film "at first cheerfully amusing and entertaining," but concluded that it was "eerily similar to watching a great comedic sketch that's jettisoned to its punch line way too soon, with all the very important build up strangely absent."

San Francisco Chronicle critic David Wiegand was "not all that fond" of "a concept in search of smarter execution than you get here."

Another Tribeca reviewer, Ryan Stewart, described the film as one of two from Mood Enhancer (Tribeca's short films program) that "some will come away loving...There are a handful of genuine laughs in this one".

== Cast ==
- Kelsey Sanders as Mary-Kate Olsen
- Jessica Amento as Ashley Olsen
- Ken Barnett as Superman
- Kevin Berntson as Glitter Dad
- Clint Catalyst as Oompa Loompa
- Peggy Dunne as Glitter Woman
- Edmund Entin as Ashley / Taylor
- Gary Entin as Mary-Kate / Hanson
- Dana Galinsky as Tourist Daughter
- Bruce Green as Pirate Johnny
- S.A. Griffin as Tourist Dad
- Liza Journo as Cupcake Girl
- Paul Ryjin as Sand
- Diane Salinger as Dorothy
- Rachel Winfree as Tourist Mom
