= Femi Emiola =

American actress

- Emiola at the iflookscouldkill.com launch party
- Born: Iowa City, Iowa, US
- Occupation: Actress
- Website: http://www.femiemiola.com

Femi Emiola is an American actress. She is best known for her roles in the TV series Wicked Wicked Games and in the web series If Looks Could Kill. Her first and last names come from the Yoruba language, and her first name is pronounced "F-eh-mi". Fẹ́mi can mean either "love me", or "marry me". However, the name "Fẹ́mi" is generally translated as "love me" and can sometimes be short for "Olúwáfẹ́mi", which means "The Lord loves me".

== Biography ==
=== Early life ===
Emiola was born in Iowa City, Iowa, to a Filipina mother and a Nigerian father, then both PhD candidates at the University of Iowa. She lived her early life in the Philippines and in Nigeria before returning to the United States as a teenager. In Nigeria, she was educated at the Federal Government Colleges and the International School Ibadan. Both her parents are chemists.

She trained in theatre arts at Iowa State University and studied in New York City with the director and acting teacher, Wynn Handman, a former colleague of Sanford Meisner and the artistic director/co-founder of The American Place Theatre.

=== Career ===
Emiola made her film debut in an award-winning short film The Living Silence. Her performance helped the filmmaker, Tanya Steele, to win a Directors Guild East Coast Student Filmmaker Award.

Between 2006 and 2007, Emiola played Lani Walker, the assistant to the vindictive and psychotic Blythe Hunter portrayed by Tatum O'Neal in the My Network TV telenovela Wicked Wicked Games, which was premiered on December 6, 2006, and shown to completion (65 episodes) in March 2007.

Emiola appeared on the television shows ER, Ghost Whisperer, Scrubs, Las Vegas, The New Adventures of Old Christine, Tyler Perry's House of Payne and The Practice.

In 2000, Emiola posed for the artist Meredith Bergmann. Emiola's profile became the foundation for Bergmann's Phillis Wheatley, which was part of the Boston Women's Memorial, unveiled in 2003 on Commonwealth Avenue Mall in Boston. The sculpture includes Lucy Stone and Abigail Adams, is crafted from bronze and granite, and is Bergmann's largest public commission.

In June 2008, Emiola became the face of a marketing campaign for the Toyota Camry. The campaign was launched on June 9, 2008, and targeted affluent African-American women aged 25 to 40. There were no television commercials; instead Toyota created an interactive website, Iflookscouldkill.com, which included a video series and an online game. The online campaign was supported by billboards and radio advertisements with Emiola's voice prompting listeners to visit the website. The $5 million campaign centered on the website and a six-episode video series, promoted as "where espionage and high fashion collide". The target audience for the campaign was African-American women with an annual income of $70,000 and up. Emiola starred as Bianca Turner, a fashion designer and owner of a Toyota Camry who becomes unwittingly involved in an espionage plot. Viewers could navigate within scenes and play along, picking up clues to assist Bianca as she tries to solve the mystery. Print and online advertisements on BET.com and Essence.com also supported the campaign which ran from June 9 to 27, 2008. The game and the site were developed by 42 Entertainment in Pasadena, California. Burrell Communications, Chicago, is Camry's agency.

== Filmography ==
=== Film/Movie ===
Year	Title	Role	Notes
2002	Plugged In	French Woman on Phone	Short
2003	The Living Silence	Lemon	Short
2004	The Invisible Man	Clarissa Bentley	Short
2005	Blood Deep	Eliza	
2006	Disposable	Nurse Becky	Short
2009	Stuck	Kylee	Short
2009	Black Girls Heart Charlie	Pepé	Short
2011	Textually Active	Kylee	Short

=== Television ===
Year	Title	Role	Notes
2004	The Practice	Sharon White	Episode: "Police State"
2004	Scrubs	Young Woman	Episode: "My Cake"
2004	Las Vegas	Young Woman	Episode: "Silver Star"
2005	ER	Lena	Episode: "Middleman"
2006	The New Adventures of Old Christine	Hostess	Episode: "Open Water"
2006	Ghost Whisperer	Rachel Fisher	Episode: "Fury"
2006–07	Wicked Wicked Games	Lani Walker	Main Cast
2008	Tyler Perry's House of Payne	Sheila	Episode: "The Beat Down"
