= Raw Feed =

American media company

- Company type: Subsidiary
- Industry: Home video
- Founded: 2006
- Defunct: 2008
- Headquarters: Inglewood, California; United States
- Key people: John Shiban; Tony Krantz; Daniel Myrick
- Products: DVD; Blu-ray
- Parent: Warner Premiere

Raw Feed was a label of Warner Premiere, the direct-to-DVD division of Warner Home Video, that focused on releasing horror films, many of them unrated, that were geared mainly towards mature audiences.

== History ==
In March 2006, it was announced John Shiban, Tony Krantz, and Daniel Myrick would form genre label, Raw Feed, for Warner Bros. Home Entertainment. The films were announced have a budget of roughly $5 million each with an open ended deal encompassing science fiction, horror, and thrillers. The first films produced under the label were Rest Stop, Sublime, and Believers Following the initial success of the label, Warner Home Video greenlit development on thriller Alice’s Apartment, science fiction thriller Supermarket, and horror film Otis. Over the course of the label's life, six films were released, before going defunct in 2008.

== Films ==
- Rest Stop (2006)
- Sublime (2007)
- Believers (2007)
- Otis (2008)
- Alien Raiders (2008)
- Rest Stop: Don't Look Back (2008)
