= Rest Stop (film) =

- DVD cover
- Directed by: John Shiban
- Written by: John Shiban
- Produced by: Tony Krantz; Daniel Myrick; John Shiban; Shawn Papazian
- Starring: Jaimie Alexander; Joey Mendicino; Deanna Russo
- Cinematography: Mark Vargo
- Edited by: Richard Byard
- Music by: Bear McCreary
- Production company: Raw Feed
- Distributed by: Warner Home Video
- Release date: October 17, 2006
- Running time: 85 minutes
- Country: United States
- Language: English

Rest Stop, also known as Rest Stop: Dead Ahead, is the first direct-to-video horror film released by Warner Studios' Raw Feed imprint on October 17, 2006. It was written and directed by John Shiban.

The film was followed by a sequel, Rest Stop: Don't Look Back.

== Plot ==
Jess picks up his girlfriend, Nicole, to head out to California in his convertible. On the way, Nicole complains she needs to urinate, and she urges Jess to find a rest stop. After exiting the building, she finds her boyfriend gone. A deranged truck driver throws her the red cell phone from the convertible, convincing her he has Jess. Nicole goes to look for help, notices an RV, bangs on the door, and asks for help. She has a short eerie ride with the passengers until she is eventually thrown out for looking at the deformed individual hidden in the back of the vehicle.

She then returns to the restroom, where she hears a girl coughing up blood (Tracy) with cuts all over whimpering in the maintenance room. She cautions Nicole about the deranged killer who tortured her. The girl then bleeds profusely, and as Nicole's attention is diverted, she disappears, blood and all. Nicole finds Tracy's missing person poster and discovers the girl has been missing since 1971.

The man in the yellow truck eludes Nicole until a motorcycle cop arrives. The cop soon falls victim to the driver of the yellow truck by being run over, his legs broken. Nicole drags the officer to the restroom to seek refuge. Eventually, the truck driver returns and locks Nicole and the officer in the restroom. When Nicole attempts to open the lock to escape, the driver reappears and bites off Nicole's finger. The officer realizes that Nicole is going into shock and commands Nicole to shoot the driver when he returns. She fires four shots out of the officer's revolver into the door but cannot see if she hit the driver. The driver then drops a camera into the restroom via the open window. The video has Jess tortured with a knife, eventually showing his tongue getting cut out. The driver feeds a hose through the window and starts pouring gasoline into the room. Nicole tries to find an escape and is able to open a hatch in the ceiling. Realizing there is no way for her to get him out of the building, the officer tells Nicole to use the two remaining bullets to kill him rather than being burned alive, and she does. The driver lights the gasoline, and Nicole hurries to get out of the building. As Nicole escapes, she notices that the officer's body has mysteriously disappeared. Nicole jumps from the roof before the building explodes.

Once she is on the ground, Nicole encounters the man in the yellow truck once again. He exits the truck, and she repeatedly strikes him with a tire iron. She turns him over and is shocked to discover it is Jess, with his mouth sewn shut. Nicole sneaks to the convertible, where she fills a whiskey bottle that she had retrieved from a nearby Park Ranger's station with gasoline to concoct a makeshift Molotov cocktail to use against her attacker, should he return.

Morning approaches, and she walks down the highway with the truck driver approaching her at a rapid speed. After some fumbling, she is able to strike a match and light her Molotov. She hurls the bottle at the truck, and almost instantly, it is consumed by flames, followed by a large explosion. She investigates the truck but finds nobody. After a few moments, she turns around, and the man in the truck is behind her.

The film ends with a different girl going to the same rest stop after being renovated due to the fire. She discovers Nicole in the maintenance room and runs out to the Park Ranger (who has returned to his post) to inform him of her discovery. After unlocking it, he goes into the room, and no one seems to be present. After he leaves, Nicole is shown behind some janitorial equipment calling out for help and vomiting blood.

The next scene is from the view of a video camera. It shows the father from the RV burying Jess' body. The man, realizing he is being taped, goes into the RV and tells his deformed son, "This is our little secret." The yellow truck then drives down a deserted road.

== Cast ==
- Jaimie Alexander as Nicole Carrow
- Joey Mendicino as Jess Hilts
- Joey Lawrence as Officer Michael Deacon
- Deanna Russo as Tracy Kress
- Diane Salinger as The Mother
- Michael Childers as The Father
- Curtis Taylor as The Ranger
- Gary and Edmund Entin as The Twins
- Mikey Post as Scotty

== Release ==
The film was rated R by the MPAA and distributed by Warner Home Video in both rated and unrated versions. It was a relative success on video, with close to $5 million in domestic video sales at retail according to The Numbers.

== Critical response ==
The film has a 0% on Rotten Tomatoes based on 6 reviews, with an average rating of 3.3/10. On IMDb, the film has a score of 4.6/10.
