= The Price of Gold =

- Once Upon a Time episode
- Episode no.: Season 1 Episode 4
- Directed by: David Solomon
- Written by: David H. Goodman
- Original air date: November 13, 2011

Guest appearances
- Lee Arenberg as Grumpy; Tim Phillipps as Prince Thomas/Sean Herman; Jessy Schram as Ella/Ashley Boyd; Meghan Ory as Ruby; Ted Whittall as The King/Mitchell Herman; Jarod Joseph as Billy (co-star); Catherine Lough Haggquist as Fairy Godmother(co-star)

Episode chronology
← Previous "Snow Falls"	Next → "That Still Small Voice"
- Once Upon a Time season 1

"The Price of Gold" is the fourth episode of the American fairy tale drama television series Once Upon a Time. The series takes place in the fictional seaside town of Storybrooke, Maine, in which the residents are actually characters from various fairy tales that were transported to the "real world" town by a powerful curse. This episode centers on Emma Swan (Jennifer Morrison) coming to the aid of a young pregnant woman named Ashley Boyd (Jessy Schram) who is trying to escape from Storybrooke and Mr. Gold (Robert Carlyle), which parallels with Cinderella's (Schram) regrettable deal she made with Rumpelstiltskin (Carlyle).

The episode was written by co-executive producer David H. Goodman, while being directed by David Solomon. Goodman used the newly introduced character of Cinderella to reveal more of Emma's backstory, as she had no flashbacks to draw upon. Schram's casting was confirmed in August 2011, when it was revealed that Cinderella's storyline would differ from the traditional fairytale. Goodman wrote the character as a naive though sweet woman who makes bad decisions that places her in even more "unfortunate circumstances." Series regular Raphael Sbarge does not appear in the episode.

"The Price of Gold" first aired in the United States on ABC on November 13, 2011. An estimated 11.327 million viewers watched the episode, placing second in its timeslot and seventeenth overall for the week. Television critics have viewed the episode positively, with many believing it was an improvement over previous installments. Carlyle's performance was also cited as a highlight, as was the episode's deviation from Cinderella's traditional story.

== Title card ==
Cinderella's fairy godmother flies through the forest.

== Plot ==
=== In the characters' past ===
In the Enchanted Forest, Cinderella ("Ella") is about to receive a wish from her fairy godmother, but the godmother is killed first by Rumpelstiltskin (Robert Carlyle) and robbed of her wand. He grants Ella (Jessy Schram) her wish to escape her home, but in return requires her to sign a contract. Rumpelstiltskin transforms Ella into an elegant woman complete with glass slippers, warning her that all magic has a price. Several months later, at a gala wedding ball for Ella and her new husband, Prince Thomas (Tim Phillipps), Snow White (Ginnifer Goodwin) and Prince Charming (Joshua Dallas) congratulate the couple on their wedding, as does Rumpelstiltskin who tells Ella that he does not care for her riches or baubles, but instead shall claim her firstborn child.

Ella tells Thomas about the deal with Rumpelstiltskin. Seeking to avoid fulfilling this deal, Thomas, Charming, Grumpy, and The Blue Fairy (Keegan Connor Tracy) come up with a plot to capture Rumpelstiltskin by luring him into signing another contract. Hours later, Ella and Rumpelstiltskin meet to sign the deal. Ella lies to him and says she is expecting twins and will give him both of the babies in exchange for improving the crops and wealth of the kingdom. A skeptical Rumpelstiltskin agrees, but as he signs the contract, he is rendered powerless due to a special red quill pen, that was created by The Blue Fairy. He is captured, but Thomas disappears soon after. Ella demands that Rumpelstiltskin tell her what has happened, but he claims not to have done anything. He reminds her that all magic has a price, and says that she will not see Thomas again until her debt is paid.

=== In Storybrooke ===
In the present day, Sheriff Graham (Jamie Dornan) gives Emma Swan (Jennifer Morrison) an offer to become his deputy. Later, Regina (Lana Parrilla) tells Emma that she is no longer afraid of her staying in the town, and cites Emma's mobile lifestyle. Emma encounters a 19-year-old pregnant maid named Ashley Boyd (Schram), crying about not having a future for both her and her baby. Emma tells Ashley that she knows how it feels to have a baby at a young age. She encourages Ashley to take charge and change her life. Later that evening, Ashley breaks into Mr. Gold's pawn shop and steals a contract from a safe. While there, she is confronted by Mr. Gold, who attempts to stop her. Ashley attacks him, leaving him unconscious on the floor of his shop.

The next day, Henry goes to Emma's home to spend time with her, despite being forbidden to do so by Regina, who has gone to a "council meeting" for the day. Mr. Gold asks Emma to track down Ashley. He claims that she has something that belongs to him and that Ashley is unstable and troubled. Emma reluctantly agrees, and learns from Ruby (Meghan Ory) that she should stop by the home of her ex-boyfriend Sean (Phillipps). Emma goes there and speaks to Sean and his father, finding out that it is the latter that has told him not to get involved with the pregnant teenager. Emma discovers that Ruby has given her car to Ashley so that she can leave Storybrooke and head to Boston. Emma and Henry (Jared S. Gilmore) find the vehicle has crashed just short of the city's limits, with Ashley about to deliver the baby.

Back at the hospital, Ashley gives birth to a girl, just in time for Mr. Gold to pick up his "merchandise". Emma tells Mr. Gold that even if he was to take the child away, he could face legal troubles that could cost him dearly. Mr. Gold then offers a deal for Emma in which he'll give up his questionable claim to the child and in return, Emma will owe him a favor. Emma agrees. After she leaves, Sean shows up to see his child, and they name the girl Alexandra. Later, Emma, over the phone, agrees to Graham's offer to become his deputy. After hanging up, the sheriff picks up his socks under the bed, revealing that Regina's "council meetings" has actually been a cover for sexual encounters with him.

== Production ==
The episode was written by co-executive producer David H. Goodman, while being directed by Buffy the Vampire Slayer veteran David Solomon. Goodman used Cinderella's storyline to produce more character development for Emma, a character with no flashbacks to draw upon. Morrison stated that Ashley/Cinderella "is definitely a character Emma relates to." Executive producer Steve Pearlman developed the series to have standalone episodes that still encouraged viewers to watch each week. In an interview, he used "The Price of Gold" as an example of this, as the episode "introduce[s] Cinderella in the first act and we resolve the story in the final act. [But then there's an] Emma portion of that story that kind of continues." Pearlman added that "there are other twists and turns along the way that don't have anything to do with the specifics of the Cinderella story that are additive to our character development. Hopefully, what we're doing over the course of the season is continuing to build each week, give the audience something new about our main characters that keeps them coming back."

In August 2011, Zap2It confirmed that actress Jessy Schram, then 25 years old, would be appearing in the new series as Cinderella. While the traditional fairytale involved Cinderella serving her step-mother and step-sisters and eventually being helped by a fairy godmother to marry her prince, Once Upon a Time portrayed her in differing circumstances. Schram explained that her "very kind and very sweet" character finds herself in an "unfortunate situation of having lost someone in her life. The Cinderella that you'll see is a portrayal of someone that's desperate to get out of the situation that she's in. Because of that, some bad decisions are made and she's stuck in even more unfortunate circumstances. Though she's matured through her upbringing and being alone most of the time, she's naïve to the outer world."

The episode was included in Reawakened: A Once Upon a Time Tale – a novelization of the first season – which was published by Hyperion Books in 2013.

== Cultural references ==
Emma is stated to have lived in Tallahassee for two years, which is a reference to the Lost episode "The Man from Tallahassee". Ruby's car contains a wolf charm, a reference to her character Red Riding Hood's traditional enemy the Big Bad Wolf. Henry is seen reading an issue of Ultimate Wolverine vs. Hulk, which was written by Damon Lindelof, the co-creator of Lost.

== Reception ==
=== Ratings ===
"The Price of Gold" first aired on November 13, 2011, in the United States. The episode scored 3.8/9 among adults aged 18 to 49, meaning that it was seen by 3.8 percent of all 18- to 49-year-olds, and 9 percent of all 18- to 49-year-olds watching television at the time of the broadcast. Among overall viewers, the score was 6.8/10. With an estimated 11.327 million viewers tuning in, it ranked second in its timeslot all together once again behind Football Night In America on NBC but ahead of The Amazing Race on CBS and The Simpsons on the Fox network. The episode was the seventeenth most watched program for the week among all networks. In Canada, the episode finished in sixteenth place for the week, garnering an estimated 1.59 million viewers, a decrease from the 1.732 million of the previous episode.

=== Reviews ===
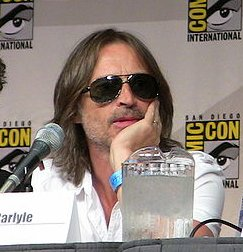
Critics praised Robert Carlyle 's performance

The episode was met with positive reviews.

Writing for Zap2it, Andrea Reiher considered it to be "another excellent episode" and gave it a ranking of three out of four. She expressed appreciation for the "charismatic and captivating" Robert Carlyle, but wished that she could see Schram and other guest stars every week instead of infrequently. Entertainment Weekly columnist Shaunna Murphy was confused as to why Ashley and Sean received a happy ending, wondering that because of the accepted mythology of the curse, "aren't people supposed to have happy endings in Fairy Tale, and miserable lives over in Storybrooke?" The episode also made Murphy appreciate the "bold and bright" Snow White, when compared to Cinderella's naive agreement with Rumpelstiltskin. TV Fanatic writer Christine Orlando was not shocked by the affair, but was surprised that "Emma fell into Mr. Gold's clutches so easily." Orlando added that she enjoyed the few appearances of Regina, opining that "who else could tell you to enjoy your cocoa and make it sound menacing?"

IGN's Amy Ratcliffe gave the episode 6.5 out of 10, and stated that she "like[d] the addition of more fairy tale characters," especially as "their stories don't follow traditional paths." Ratcliffe added that "the transition between worlds works and has a natural feel. It can't be easy to pull off," but wished that the pace of the main storyline would increase. The A.V. Club writer Oliver Sava graded the episode with a B and considered it the best of the series up to that point, citing its "fair share of forward momentum," Morrison's large amount of screen time, and an improvement in flashbacks. Sava compared it to the previous episode, believing "The Price of Gold" to be superior because it deviated further from the traditional fairytale formula. He lauded Caryle's "more dimensional" performance, but said that Regina continued to be a "caricature." Sava concluded that Goldman "does strong work showing the juxtaposition between reality and fantasy in a less contrived way than last week’s episode."

== Cast ==
=== Starring ===
- Ginnifer Goodwin as Snow White/Mary Margaret Blanchard
- Jennifer Morrison as Emma Swan
- Lana Parrilla as Evil Queen
- Josh Dallas as Prince Charming
- Jared S. Gilmore as Henry Mills
- Raphael Sbarge (credit only)
- Jamie Dornan as Sheriff Graham
- Robert Carlyle as Rumplestiltskin/Mr. Gold

=== Guest Starring ===
- Lee Arenberg as Grumpy
- Tim Phillipps as Prince Thomas/Sean Herman
- Jessy Schram as Ella/Ashley Boyd
- Meghan Ory as Ruby
- Ted Whittall as The King/Mitchell Herman

=== Co-Starring ===
- Natalie Gibson as Female Doc
- Catherine Lough Haggquist as Fairy Godmother
- Jarod Joseph as Billy

=== Uncredited ===
- Unknown as Floyd
- Unknown baby as Alexandra
- Jan Brandle Smith as Lady Tremaine
- Unknown as Clorinda
- Unknown as Tisbe
- Chantal Hunt as Party Goer
- Maiko Miyauchi as Party Goer
- Jeffrey Mortensen as Party Goer
- Pam Rosa as Parry Goer
- Morgan Tanner as Party Goer
