= Daniel Myrick =

American film director

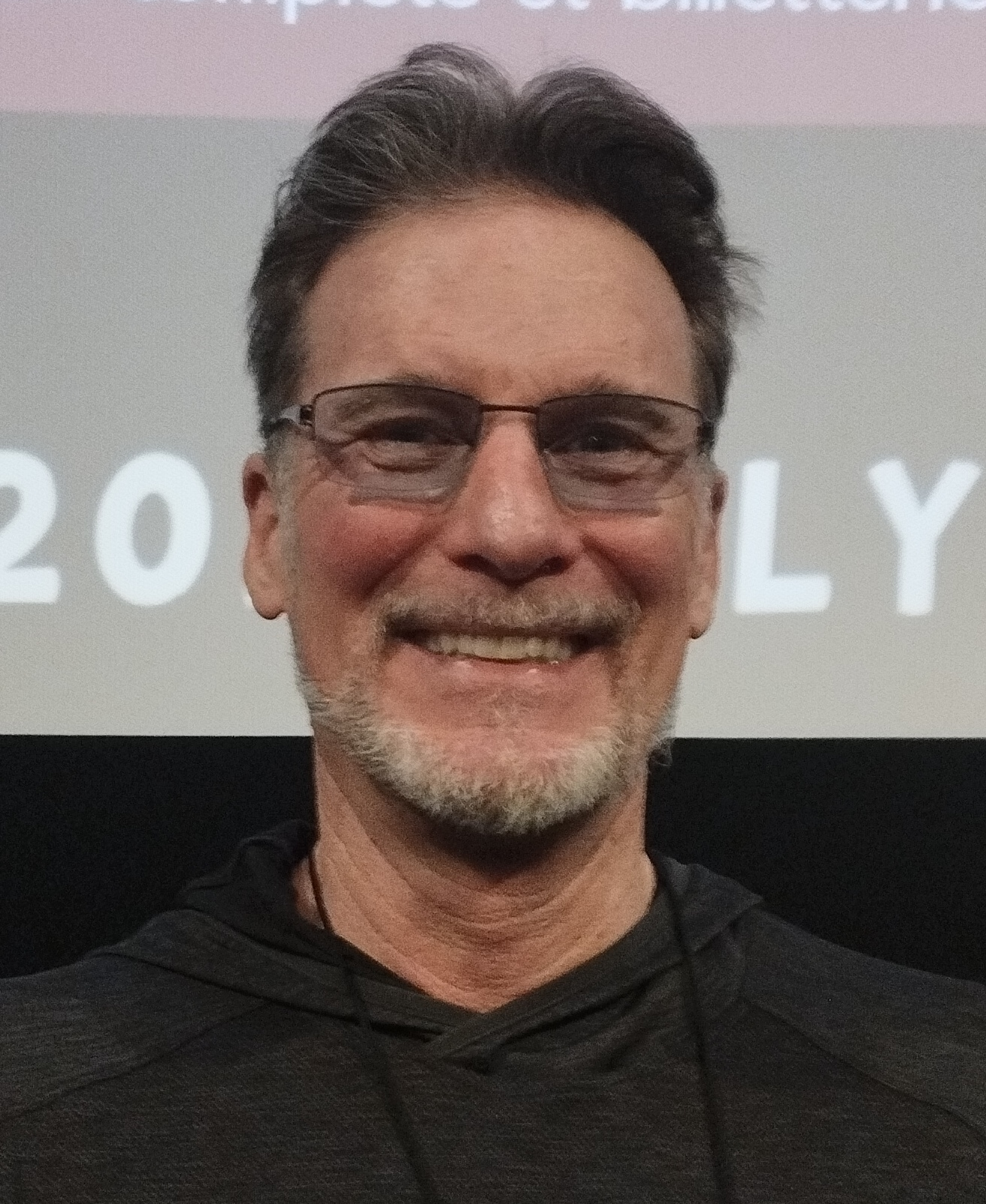
- Myrick in 2026
- Born: September 3, 1963 (age 63); Sarasota, Florida, U.S.
- Occupations: Film director; film producer; screenwriter; editor

Daniel Myrick (born September 3, 1963) is an American film director, most famous for horror films, especially for co-directing and writing the 1999 psychological horror The Blair Witch Project with Eduardo Sánchez. He won the Independent Spirit John Cassavetes Award for this film.

== Early life ==
Myrick was born in Sarasota, Florida. He graduated from University of Central Florida School of Film in 1994.

== Career ==
Along with collaborating with future Blair Witch cohorts Eduardo Sánchez and Gregg Hale on a trilogy of short films, Myrick supported himself by working as an editor and cinematographer on a number of Florida-based music videos and commercials. After he wrote and directed the promo for the Florida Film Festival in 1997, Myrick's work caught the eye of independent film guru John Pierson, helping to set the stage for the eventual 1999 debut of Myrick and Sanchez's first feature as co-writers and directors.

In 2006, he co-founded Raw Feed, a direct to DVD division of Warner Home Video that specialized in horror films, with The X-Files executive producer John Shiban and 24 executive producer Tony Krantz.

In 2025, Myrick endorsed a bill in the Maryland General Assembly to exonerate people convicted of witchcraft in Colonial Maryland, stating that "We are a flawed nation, and were born out of doing some incredibly cruel things” and that a belated "symbolic" recognition of past injustice was better than none at all.

== Filmography ==
Feature films

- The Blair Witch Project (1999)
- Solstice (2007)
- Believers (2007)
- The Objective (2008)
- Skyman (2019)

Television films

- Under the Bed (2017)

Short films

- Curse of the Blair Witch (1999)
- Sticks and Stones: Investigating the Blair Witch (1999)
- Black Veil (2021)

Web series

- The Strand (2006)

Television episodes

- Split Screen (1997-2000) (unknown episodes)
