= Christian Stavrakis =

American artist, filmmaker and writer

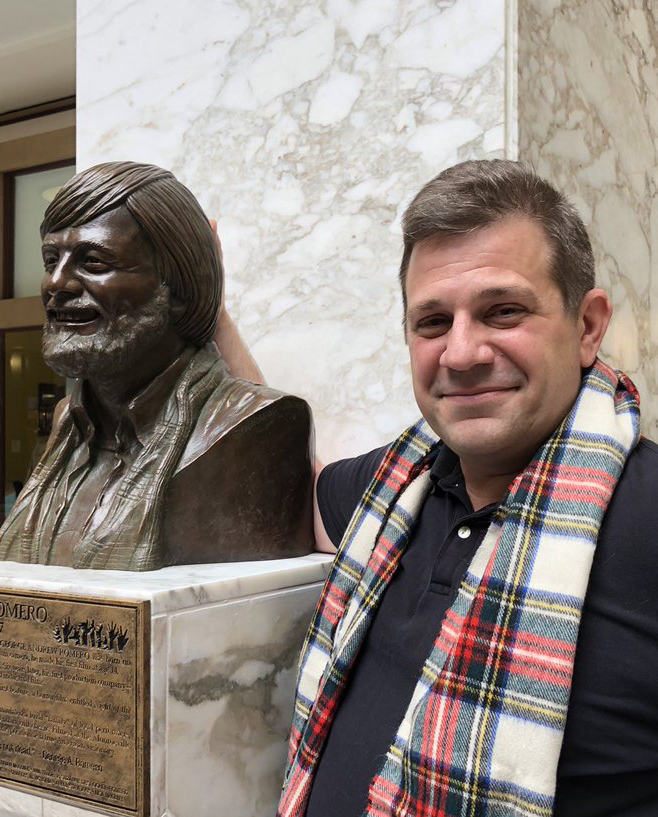
- Christian Stavrakis in 2018
- Born: June 6, 1971 (age 55); Pittsburgh, Pennsylvania, U.S.
- Occupations: Artist, film director, screenwriter, producer, actor

Christian Constantine Stavrakis (born June 6, 1971) is an American fine artist, filmmaker and writer. An authority on the works of filmmaker George A. Romero, Stavrakis sculpted the bronze bust of Romero which was installed at the Monroeville Mall near Pittsburgh, PA on the 40th anniversary of the filming of Dawn of the Dead. He also appears on several DVD commentary tracks as a historian and moderator, notably the 1999 BMG release of Dawn of the Dead and the 2000 release of Knightriders by Anchor Bay Entertainment. In the latter, Romero himself states that "Chris has an encyclopedic knowledge of my films."

== Biography ==
Stavrakis's older brother Taso was studying at Carnegie-Mellon University when he met Tom Savini, who was teaching a stage makeup course. When Savini was approached by Romero to create makeup effects for his long-awaited sequel to Night of the Living Dead, he hired Taso to assist with stunts and makeup, which led to their working together on Friday the 13th, Knightriders, and Day of the Dead. Inspired by his brother's work with the iconoclastic filmmaker, Christian pursued a career in film and art, deeply influenced by Romero's legacy.

Stavrakis's family moved from Pittsburgh to Rockville, Maryland in 1977, where he attended Wheaton High School and befriended classmate Eduardo Sánchez, who offered him a role in Falling Down a Mountain, an uncompleted film project. When The Blair Witch Project – produced and co-directed by Sánchez – was released in 1999, Stavrakis and Sánchez reunited and subsequently collaborated on several Haxan Films projects including Altered and Lovely Molly, for which Christian sculpted a horse-head relief which figures prominently in the film and its poster art. The success of The Blair Witch Project inspired Stavrakis to create his own found footage film, Mortal Remains, which was released in 2013.

Stavrakis has worked on many other productions, most notably Night of the Living Dead (1990), Dogma (1999), The Mothman Prophecies (2002), Sudden Death (1995), and Wonder Boys (2000). In 1995 he appeared as an assistant to Tom Savini on the Discovery Channel series Movie Magic in a Season 2 episode titled Horror Makeup: Fright Factories, which featured insights into the creation of special effects makeup for horror films.

In 1994, Stavrakis created the internet's first George A. Romero website, LivingDead.com, which served as a hub for fans of Romero's work until 2002. The site was a pioneering effort in preserving and celebrating the legacy of Romero in the early days of the internet. Also, over the course of 12 years, Stavrakis compiled The Complete 1978 Score, an unreleased 67-track compilation of De Wolfe Music library cues remixed with original score tracks by Goblin to recreate the cues as heard in the 126-minute U.S. cut of Dawn of the Dead. This comprehensive soundtrack became a highly regarded resource among fans.

In 1998, Stavrakis served as assistant director to Romero on a proof-of-concept pilot for a reality TV series to be called Iron City Asskickers. The concept involved a group of wrestlers and their quirky, off-kilter fans, with Romero and Stavrakis appearing as barroom spectators. The show, set in a local dive bar and a Pittsburgh-area wrestling arena, aimed to combine professional wrestling with reality-based storytelling. Although it was never fully developed, the project highlights Romero's interest in exploring different media.

A year later, Stavrakis began work on a "making-of" documentary on Dawn of the Dead to be called Dawn 2K. Interviews with Romero and all principal cast and crew members were filmed in Pittsburgh, New York City, and Los Angeles, where Stavrakis and his Pittsburgh team were stranded by the September 11, 2001 attacks as all commercial flights within the United States were grounded. The project was never completed, and all interview footage was subsequently lost or destroyed.

Stavrakis's work in honoring Romero, particularly through the memorial sculpture, has been recognized as a significant contribution to the horror community. The Second Sight 2010 Dawn of the Dead 4K DVD box set includes a bonus feature entitled Memories of Monroeville, in which the artist speaks about his inspiration for creating the sculpture, which honors Romero's significant impact on the horror genre and popular culture as a whole. The bust was referenced in the October 2019 issue of Smithsonian magazine in an article on the 21st century phenomenon of "zombie malls."

Christian serves as artistic director of the George A. Romero Foundation in Pittsburgh. In addition to creating graphics for web initiatives and merchandise, he sculpted the organization's Pioneer Award statuette of an elderly Romero wearing his trademark Goliath glasses (for which an actual pair of Romero's glasses were scanned and 3D printed at the proper scale).

== Filmography ==
- Mortal Remains (2013)
