= Exists (film) =

- Theatrical release poster
- Directed by: Eduardo Sánchez
- Written by: Jamie Nash
- Story by: Eduardo Sanchez
- Produced by: Robin Cowie; Jane Fleming; Andy Jenkins; Mark Ordesky
- Starring: Dora Madison Burge; Brian Steele; Samuel Davis
- Cinematography: John Rutland
- Edited by: Andrew Eckblad; Andy Jenkins
- Music by: Nima Fakhrara
- Production companies: Court Five; Haxan Films; Miscellaneous Entertainment
- Distributed by: Lionsgate
- Release dates: March 7, 2014 (SXSW); October 24, 2014 (United States)
- Running time: 86 minutes
- Country: United States
- Language: English
- Box office: $41,930

Exists is a 2014 American found footage monster horror film, directed by Eduardo Sánchez. The film had its world premiere on March 7, 2014, at South by Southwest, and stars Chris Osborn and Samuel Davis. The story revolves around a group of friends hunted by something in the woods of East Texas. Following the darker psychological tone of Sánchez's previous film Lovely Molly, the film returns to the creature-feature horror of Altered, also written by Jamie Nash.

== Plot ==
Brothers Brian and Matt invite a group of friends - Matt's girlfriend Dora and their friends Todd and Elizabeth - on a camping trip to their uncle Bob's cabin in East Texas. Driving on the forest road, Matt hits something with the car and stops to investigate. The group hears loud animal cries in the distance but dismisses them. Finding the road blocked by a fallen tree, the group continues on foot and reaches the cabin, only to discover that it is dilapidated. The group decides to spend the night in the car, where Brian and Matt again hear the loud cries.

The following morning, Brian finds blood on the fender and a tuft of hair in the grille. Brian catches sight of what he claims is Bigfoot running along a nearby ridge, but the group dismisses him. Determined to get the creature on film, he sets up several GoPro cameras at various points around the cabin. That night, the creature continues to scream and harasses the group. Using his camera's night vision, Brian catches a glimpse of the roaring creature through a window. At daybreak, the group attempts to leave but finds their car completely destroyed. Matt and Brian reveal that they didn't tell their uncle Bob they were using his cabin and that they stole the keys from him, so rescue is unlikely.

Matt bikes to an area of the woods that has cell phone reception so that he can call for help, but just as he gets through to Bob, he is attacked by the Bigfoot. At the cabin, the others move furniture to block the windows and doors. They uncover a trapdoor to the cabin's cellar, where Todd finds a shotgun. At nightfall, the Bigfoot attacks the cabin and kills Elizabeth before Todd shoots it, causing it to flee.

The remaining three members of the group decide to hike toward the road. That night, they rescue the injured Matt from the creature's den. As dawn breaks, the group takes shelter in an abandoned RV. Brian receives a call from Bob, who is now at the cabin. Todd sets off fireworks hoping to alert Bob to their location, only to have the Bigfoot attack him. The creature then pushes the RV over the edge of a hill with Brian, Matt, and Dora still inside. When Brian regains consciousness, he finds Matt and Dora dead. Brian flees but the creature pursues and drags him off.

Brian awakens next to his deceased friends. Nearby he observes the corpse of a juvenile Bigfoot, and realizes they killed it accidentally with the car. The Bigfoot begins to attack him when uncle Bob arrives and shoots it with a rifle. As they flee for Bob's truck, the Bigfoot ambushes and kills Bob. Brian picks up his uncle's gun and runs as the creature gives chase. He turns and points it at the Bigfoot, begging it to stop and begins to apologize. The wounded creature stares at Brian, who lowers the rifle. Still recording, Brian turns his back to the creature and prepares to be killed but the Bigfoot disappears into the forest.

== Cast ==
- Dora Madison Burge as Dora
- Chris Osborn as Brian
- Roger Edwards as Todd
- Denise Williamson as Elizabeth
- Samuel Davis as Matt
- Brian Steele as Sasquatch
- Jeff Schwan as Uncle Bob (as J.P. Schwan)
- George P. Gakoumis Jr. as Firework Salesman (as George Gakoumis)
- Stefanie Sanchez as 911 Operator

== Release ==
Exists premiered at the South by Southwest film festival on March 7, 2014, and was released on February 3, 2015. Entertainment One set the United Kingdom release on DVD and Blu-ray for the April 6, 2015.

== Reception ==
On review aggregator Rotten Tomatoes, Exists holds an approval rating of 30%, based on 24 reviews, and an average rating of 4.80/10. On Metacritic, the film has a weighted average score of 22 out of 100, based on 22 critics, indicating "generally unfavorable" reviews.

In a particularly scathing review, Keith Uhlich from The A.V. Club wrote, "It feels strange to be so dismissive about someone who once commanded wide attention (however much as a fluke) with an indie blockbuster that effectively birthed a lucrative mainstream genre. But Sánchez, sadly, is now a pretender to his own throne." Ed Gonzalez of Slant Magazine rated the film 1.5 out of 4 stars, panning the film's uninteresting characters, 'under-realized metaphorical ambitions', and thin story. Geoff Berkshire from Variety criticized the film's thin characters, and script, writing, "Eschewing the painfully slow-burning suspense and pseudo-realism that helped make Blair Witch a sleeper smash and genre touchstone, Sanchez’s thoroughly conventional approach here does little to elevate a dismally generic script". Robert Abele of the Los Angeles Times was highly critical of the film, calling it "aggressively unimaginative". Frank Scheck from The Hollywood Reporter similarly criticized the film's clichéd script, and thin characters, calling it "a compendium of horror movie clichés whose visual style is roughly akin to trying to watch a movie while riding in a rollercoaster."

The film was not without its supporters. Richard Wittaker of Fearnet praised Exists for its editing and score, as they felt that it would help make the movie appeal to people who would not normally like found footage films. The Austin Chronicle gave a predominantly positive review and commented that while the film held several similarities to Sánchez's The Blair Witch Project, "he evades all those bear traps, returning tension and pathos to the monster movie."
