= Jane Fleming =

Jane Fleming or Flemming may refer to:

- Jane Stanhope, Countess of Harrington (née Fleming; 1755–1824), British society hostess and heiress
- Jane Fleming (producer), American film and television producer
- Jane Flemming (born 1965), Australian Olympic track and field athlete
