= Brian Steele =

American actor

- Born: September 27, 1963 (age 63); Milford, Michigan
- Occupation: Actor
- Years active: 1992–present

Brian Steele is an American actor who is best known for frequently playing monsters in films and television. From 2018 to 2021 he appeared as The Robot in Lost in Space. Steele stands at 6 ft 7 in (2.01 m).

== Career ==
On television, Steele was the third (of three) actors to play the Bigfoot called Harry in the series Harry and the Hendersons, starting in 1992, before moving on to play creatures in theatrical motion pictures, with roles like Mr. Wink in Hellboy 2: The Golden Army wearing over 130 pounds of makeup. Steele has portrayed Drake Beast in Blade: Trinity, Sammael in Hellboy, Lycan werewolves in Underworld and Underworld: Rise of the Lycans, William Corvinus in Underworld: Evolution, T-600 in Terminator Salvation, Berzerker Predator in Predators, and a Bigfoot in the Eduardo Sánchez horror-thriller film Exists.

From 2006 to 2014, Steele portrayed the prank-redeeming Sasquatch in over 40 "Messin' with Sasquatch" commercials for Jack Link's Jerky.

== Personal life ==
As a young child, Steele was described as perpetually hyperactive and adventurous. Growing up, he had no real career dream or direction for himself. But at the age of 24, moved to Los Angeles which proved to be a defining moment of his life. He first found employment at Universal Studios Theme Park working as Frankenstein's monster, but soon found himself in an on-screen role due to his towering stature. Steele has participated in multiple ultra-distance, self-supported cycling races, including the Tour Divide mountain bike race and the Trans Am Bike Race. He was featured in the 2014 documentary "Inspired to Ride".

== Filmography ==
Year	Title	Role	Notes
1997	The Relic	Kothoga	Acting Debut
1997	The Edge	Bear	Uncredited
2000	Bless the Child	Throne Demon	Uncredited
2001	Monkeybone	Jumbo the Elephant God	
2002	Men in Black II	Sharkmouth	Uncredited
2003	Underworld	Werewolf	
2004	Hellboy	Sammael	
2004	Blade: Trinity	Drake Creature	Uncredited
2005	The Cave	Creature Performer	
2005	Doom	Hell Knight	
2006	Underworld: Evolution	William	
2006	Lady in the Water	Tartutic #2	
2007	Resident Evil: Extinction	Rancid / Tyrant	
2008	Hellboy II: The Golden Army	Wink / Cronie / Spice Shop Troll / Cathedral Head / Fragglewump	
2009	Underworld: Rise of the Lycans	Big Lycan / Creature Performer	
2009	Terminator Salvation	T-600 suit performer	
2010	Predators	Berserker Predator / Falconer Predator	
2010	Dylan Dog: Dead of Night	Tattooed Zombie / Belial	
2011	Your Highness	Minotaur	
2013	Anchorman 2: The Legend Continues	Were-Hyena / Minotaur	
2014	Paranormal Activity: The Marked Ones	Creature	Uncredited
2014	Exists	Sasquatch	
2015	Inspired to Ride	Himself	

== Television ==
Year	Title	Role	Notes
1992–1993	Harry and the Hendersons	Harry	24 episodes
1994–1995	Earth 2	Terrian #1	22 episodes
1998	Creature	Creature Actor	TV film
1999	Can of Worms	Thoad	TV film
2001	The Day the World Ended	The Creature	TV film
2013	Grimm	Volcanalis	Episode "Volcanalis"
2018–2021	Lost in Space	The Robot	
