= The Quest (2022 TV series) =

- Genre: Fantasy/Hybrid-Reality
- Directed by: Harold Cronk; Jack Cannon; Elise Doganieri
- Starring: Emily Gateley; Braeden De La Garza; Racquel Jean Louis; Elliott Ross; Kerwin Thompson; Harry Aspinwall; Mel Mehrabian; Jarod Lindsey
- Country of origin: United States
- Original language: English
- No. of seasons: 1
- No. of episodes: 8

Production
- Executive producers: Bertram van Munster; Elise Doganieri; Jane Fleming; Mark Ordesky; Michael Williams; Rob Eric
- Production locations: Calistoga, California
- Cinematography: Mark Kohl
- Camera setup: Multiple-camera setup
- Production companies: Court Five; New Media Collective; Scout Productions

Original release
- Network: Disney+
- Release: May 11, 2022

Related
- The Quest (2014 TV series)

The Quest is an American fantasy-based reality television series that streams on the network Disney+, that premiered on May 11, 2022. A reboot of the 2014 fantasy-based reality competition series of the same name, The Quest features a group of players brought to a castle in the fictional world of Everealm on a fantasy quest to save the realm from an evil force, and reveal the One True Hero among them who will defeat the evil. The show features a similar narrative/reality game structure to the 2014 series, but focuses more heavily on the scripted narrative, with all players now teenagers.

Disney announced in January 2020 that a new version of The Quest would be produced for its Disney+ streaming service, with van Munster and Doganieri returning as executive producers. van Munster had pitched the revival to Disney after they had announced plans for the streaming service. On April 2, 2022, a trailer was released, announcing a May 11, 2022 premiere date. The series was removed from Disney+ on May 26, 2023.

== Format ==
A group of teenagers participate in an immersive scripted adventure in a high fantasy setting, the kingdom of Everealm. The adventure is structured around various challenges tied to the fantasy storyline. While the ongoing storyline is scripted and the contestants are interacting with actors throughout the competition, the actual challenges are genuine, with competitive outcomes determined by the contestants' abilities and decisions. Unlike the 2014 series, the reboot is presented almost entirely in the mode of a traditional scripted drama, with minimal use of reality television devices such as confessionals or eliminations that would disrupt the immersion of the players in the adventure scenario.

== Plot ==
The dark sorceress Tavora and her Dark Legion seek to conquer the magical world of Everealm. As he falls in battle, King Magnus of Sanctum entrusts the mythical Divine Crown with his footsoldier Mila to bring to his three children—Emmett, Adaline, and Cedric—heirs to the throne of Sanctum. Mila arrives in Oraa to deliver the Crown, where the heirs are in hiding under the protection of King Magnus's brother King Silas—along with Magnus's advisor, Dravus, a palace mage. At the same time, eight American teenagers are summoned to Oraa by the Fate Talmuh to restore the Divine Crown and redeem the bond between Everealm and the three Fates. Designated "Paladins," the eight teenagers must reclaim the Divine Crown's four Gems of Virtue. Through these and other challenges along the way, the Paladins demonstrate the virtues of a hero. For each challenge, and outstanding Paladin is awarded a talisman. The accumulation of talismans is used in determining the Paladins who may seek to claim the Divine Crown's fifth gem, the Kingstone, revealing themself as the "One True Hero" with the power to save Everealm.

== Paladins ==
- David (14, Waldorf, Maryland)
- Serean (14, Tenino, Washington)
- Holden (16, Northridge, California)
- Myra (16, Queens, New York)
- Shaan (13, San Ramon, California)
- Ava (14, Northwood, New Hampshire)
- Caden (16, Sugarland, Texas)
- Toshani (14, Schenectady, New York)

== Cast ==
- Emily Gateley as Mila, footsoldier of the Runeguard Army
- Braeden De La Garza as Prince Emmett, one of Sanctum's three heirs
- Racquel Jean-Louis as Princess Adaline, one of Sanctum's three heirs
- Elliott Ross as Prince Cederic, one of Sanctum's three heirs
- Kerwin Thompson as King Silas, King of Oraa
- Harry Aspinwall as Dravus, King Magnus' mage
- Mel Mehrabian as Sorceress Tavora
- Nandi Chapman as Talmuh, one of the three Fates.
- Sajel Oh as Solas, one of the three Fates.
- Louise Lagana as Karu, one of the three Fates.
- Keith G. Brown as King Magnus
- Frederic Winkler as General Kane, general of the Dark Legion
- Jarod Lindsey as Ramus, member of the Dark Legion
- Dane DiLiegro as the Dragior

== Production ==
The Quest was produced by Court Five (producer of The Lord of the Rings trilogy), The New Media Collective (producer of The Amazing Race) and Scout Productions (producer of Queer Eye). It was filmed on location in Calistoga, California at Castello di Amorosa. Originally intended to film at Burg Kreuzenstein as with the 2014 series, the new series moved production to Castello di Amorosa in Napa Valley due to the COVID-19 pandemic. Production took place from January 2021 to March 2021.

Executive producers for the series are Jane Fleming and Mark Ordesky from Court Five; Bertram van Munster, Elise Doganieri and Mark Dziak from The New Media Collective; and Rob Eric, Michael Williams and David Collins from Scout Productions. Mike Foley is the showrunner.

== Episodes ==
No.	Title	Original release date
1	"Strangers Arrive"	May 11, 2022
2	"The Weight of the World"	May 11, 2022
3	"A Mysterious Gift"	May 11, 2022
4	"A Castle Divided"	May 11, 2022
5	"Chaos"	May 11, 2022
6	"Betrayal From Within"	May 11, 2022
7	"A Light in the Darkness"	May 11, 2022
8	"The One True Hero"	May 11, 2022

== Game summary ==
Episode Talismans	1	2		3		4		5 (Note: The Paladins did not succeed in the latter challenge of this episode. No talisman was awarded.)		6		7		8 (Note: For episode 8, bold indicates the Paladin who retrieved the Kingstone, and is the One True Hero of Everealm)
3										**David**	David	David	David	David
2			**David**	David	David	David	David	David; **Ava**	David; Ava	Ava	Ava	Ava; **Serean**	Ava; Serean; **Holden**	**Holden**
1	**David**	David; **Caden**	Caden	Caden; **Shaan**	**Ava**; Caden; Shaan	Ava; **Serean**; Caden; Shaan	Ava; Serean; **Holden**; Caden; Shaan	Serean; Holden; Caden; Shaan	Serean; Holden; Caden; Shaan	Serean; Holden; Caden; Shaan	Serean; Holden; Caden; Shaan; **Myra**; **Toshani**	Holden; Caden; Shaan; Myra; Toshani	Caden; Shaan; Myra; Toshani	Toshani

Bold indicates a Paladin who was awarded a talisman for an outstanding performance in the challenge.

Talismans

1. Talisman of Courage - Awarded to David
2. Talisman of Speed - Awarded to Caden
3. Talisman of Strength - Awarded to David
4. Talisman of Initiative - Awarded to Shaan
5. Talisman of Wisdom - Awarded to Ava
6. Talisman of Resilience - Awarded to Serean
7. Talisman of Leadership - Awarded to Holden
8. Talisman of Knowledge - Awarded to Ava
9. Talisman of Ambition - Awarded to David
10. Talisman of Kindness - Awarded to Toshani and Myra
11. Talisman of Intelligence - Awarded to Serean
12. Talisman of Friendship - Awarded to Holden

Grouped based on the number of talismans accumulated, the Paladins selected a single member from each group to participate in the trial for the Kingstone. With the most talismans, David was the first Paladin selected. With 2 talismans apiece; Ava, Serean, and Holden were in the second group; from which Holden was selected. From the remaining Paladins, Toshani was chosen. In the trial, Holden was the first Paladin to complete the trial, and was the one to retrieve the Kingstone, proving himself the One True Hero.

== Reception ==
=== Critical reception ===
Several reviewers praised The Quest for its high production values for a reality TV show—with good effects and production design, dedicated performances by the actors, and ambitious scriptwriting—such that the show felt more like a regular scripted fantasy drama than a reality TV show. Reality TV blogger Andy Dehnart writes, "The show provides attention to details that few reality TV shows are even aware of, and there are plenty of scripted shows on broadcast and cable with weaker acting and writing." The actors were complimented on both their handling of the scripted material, as well as their apparent improvisational skills when dealing with the teenaged players. The enthusiastic, positive, and collaborative attitudes of the players was commended as a refreshing change of pace for a reality series, and wholesome for the intended young adult fiction audience. Denhart gave the series a "B" letter grade, Joel Keller for Decider gave The Quest a favorable "stream it" recommendation, and Tony Betti of Laughing Place gave it a score of 7 out of 10.

While praising the scripted fantasy aspect of the show, a number of reviewers expressed disappointment at the limited attention drawn to the players, with the little opportunity to distinguish them or explore their individual stories—which was attributed to the shift away from a reality TV presentation style. Regarding the omission of confessionals, Keller notes, "Without the benefit of side interviews, it's hard to know exactly what these kids are thinking." Multiple reviewers remarked on being unable to name most of the players after watching the initial episodes. The reviewers posited that the quality of the scripted fantasy aspect of the show worked to the detriment of the players on the reality TV side of the show, with Denhart stating, "The Quest's storytelling and production are so thoroughly immersive, it nearly entirely swallows the contestants, making them more like props than main characters."

From a scripted sci-fi/fantasy perspective, Nelson Acosta of Fiction Horizon called The Quest "a TV series that is trying to be two things at the same time," and deemed the series a failure on nearly every level from conception to execution—criticizing the believability of the players' behavior as "clearly directed," the acting as "pretty bad overall," and the story as "so incredibly generic that it is laughable." Acosta argued that having the entire season available to view all at once eliminates any suspense to a reality competition, and attributed the decision to an lack of faith on the part of Disney—an attempt to dispense with the series as quickly as possible. Acosta gave the series a score of 2 out of 10, calling it "potentially one of the worst shows of the year." Sharon at DisneyFanatic.com stated that "The Quest is filled with fantasy tropes. However, [...] the show comes across as charming in its predictability instead of being silly."

=== Accolades ===
Year	Award	Category	Recipient	Result	Ref.
2022	Children's and Family Emmy Awards	Outstanding Special Effects Costumes, Hair and Makeup for a Live Action Program	Mike Elizalde, Alan J. Gonzalez Ramirez, Rose Labarre, Tim Peters, Johnny Wujek, Sarah Dixey, Erica Adams, Alyn Topper, Lauren McKeever, Jennifer Tremont, Elle Favorule, Michelle Sfarzo, Sonia Caberera, Nancy Leonardi	Won	
2022	Children's and Family Emmy Awards	Outstanding Directing for a Multiple Camera Program	Jack Cannon, Harold Cronk, Elise Doganieri, Bertram van Munster	Won	
2022	Children's and Family Emmy Awards	Outstanding Editing for a Multiple Camera Program	Derek Esposito, Rob Chandler, Lindsay Ragone	Nominated	
2023	Hollywood Makeup Artist and Hair Stylist Guild Awards	Best Makeup - Children and Teen Programming	Elle Favorule, Michelle Sfarzo, Sonia Cabrera	Won	
2023	Hollywood Makeup Artist and Hair Stylist Guild Awards	Best Hair Styling - Children and Teen Programming	Erica Adams, Alyn Topper, Lauren McKeever, Jennifer Tremont	Won	
