= Mortal Remains =

- Directed by: Christian Stavrakis; Mark Ricche
- Written by: Christian Stavrakis
- Produced by: Mark Ricche; Christian Stavrakis
- Starring: Christian Stavrakis; Mark Ricche; Eduardo Sanchez; David Burian; Josh Brokaw
- Narrated by: Michael Gornick
- Cinematography: Stavrakis & Ricche
- Edited by: Ricche & Stavrakis
- Music by: Kevin McLeod
- Production company: Cryptic Pictures LLC
- Distributed by: Cryptic Pictures (US)
- Release date: October 13, 2013
- Running time: 94 minutes
- Country: United States
- Language: English

Mortal Remains is a 2013 American mockumentary horror/thriller film directed by Christian Stavrakis and Mark Ricche. The film purports to be a documentary investigation into the grisly legends surrounding fictional Maryland filmmaker Karl Atticus.

== Plot ==
Mark and Chris (portraying themselves) are old friends with a shared love of filmmaking. When their high school classmate Eduardo Sánchez directs a movie called The Blair Witch Project, Mark and Chris reunite with him by way of a parody film. Some years later, interviewing Sanchez for a retrospective documentary, the director relates a rumor he had heard during production on Blair Witch about an underground Maryland director named Karl Atticus.

Atticus, a little-known Baltimore filmmaker from the late 1960s with two gruesome horror films to his name, dropped out of sight and apparently committed suicide following the violent premiere of his second film – itself titled Mortal Remains. Interviews with friends and relatives of the filmmaker tell a grim story, and Mark and Chris abandon their Blair Witch documentary in favor of tracking down the origins of the Atticus legend.

The deeper they dig, however, it becomes apparent that Atticus was making much more than simple exploitation. The source material of his films, it is revealed, is the works of a shadowy 1920s horror writer named Vernon Blake, whose obscure books of gory fiction were rife with occult symbology and cryptic ciphers. A historian explains the use of the ciphers as potential markers; Mark and Chris discover a cipher "in the wild" shortly thereafter.

Glimpses are shown into the weird world of Atticus's brand of filmmaking, particularly with Culture Shock, a segment from Atticus's first film, in which a pair of mercenaries are snuffed out by a vicious tribe of native women. Interview subjects begin to demur, receiving stalker-like telephone calls. Mark is badly beaten during a nighttime search of a large cemetery; Chris, apparently obsessed, plows ahead and insists upon digging up a grave in search of clues.

== Cast ==
- Christian Stavrakis as himself
- Mark Ricche as himself
- Eduardo Sánchez as himself
