= Seventh Moon =

- Directed by: Eduardo Sánchez
- Written by: Eduardo Sánchez; Jamie Nash
- Produced by: Matt Compton; Robin Cowie; Gregg Hale
- Starring: Amy Smart; Tim Chiou; Dennis Chan
- Cinematography: Wah-Chuen Lam
- Edited by: Michael Cronin; Johnny Rice
- Music by: Antonio Cora; Kent Sparling
- Production company: Haxan Films
- Distributed by: Ghost House Underground; Lionsgate; Paradiso Home Entertainment; Rok Americas; Seventh Moon Partners
- Release dates: September 20, 2008 (Austin Fantastic Fest); October 6, 2009 (United States)
- Running time: 87 minutes
- Country: United States
- Language: English

Seventh Moon is a 2008 American horror film written by Eduardo Sánchez and Jamie Nash, and directed by Eduardo Sánchez. Part of Robert Tapert's Ghost House Underground DVD series, and entirely shot in shaky cam style. The film is based on the Chinese legend that on the full moon of the seventh lunar month, the gates of hell open and the dead can enter the realm of the living. It stars Amy Smart as an American woman who is spending her honeymoon in China with her newlywed Chinese-American husband. While driving through the countryside the couple gets stranded and has to find a way to survive the fateful night.

== Plot ==
Newlyweds Melissa and Yul are spending their honeymoon in China. They participate in the "Hungry Ghost" Festival, where according to legend, the dead roam among the living.

Their affable guide Ping drives them to the village where Yul's relatives live. At night while Yul is asleep, Ping stops the car and tells Melissa he must ask for directions. Ping does not return, so Melissa and Yul search for him. The windows in the village are boarded up and live animals are left as offerings along the empty streets. The locals start chanting something unintelligible from behind the doors.

The couple returns to the car and decides to drive away without Ping, trying to find the way back to the city. They meet a wounded stranger on the road. Helping him, they are attacked and chased by pale creatures. They seek shelter in a barn, where the stranger tries to knock Yul out to feed him to the creatures in his place. Melissa manages to subdue the man and drag a wounded Yul back to the car. The stranger is slaughtered while Melissa and Yul barricade themselves inside the car.

The creatures smash the car to reach the couple, who escape through the trunk, reaching safety inside a crypt. They hear the villagers chanting again, the chant led by the same male voice they had heard on the radio while first trying to drive away. They are compelled to leave their hiding place and enter a house adorned with lit candles, where a large number of people are gathered. In their trance, they hear reassuring words in their mind. They let the villagers strip them down and start having sex on the floor in front of them, then blackout.

Melissa and Yul wake up in a field, tied up to a tree back to back. The creatures are now all around them. Yul, realizing that they are the chosen sacrifices, starts telling the demons to take him and spare his wife. The creatures comply, and Melissa wakes up inside the house, while Ping shows up again and explains to her that they have been forced to lure outsiders in as sacrifices, to stop the moon demons from taking one of the villagers. Ping says Yul did a very brave thing by letting himself be taken to save his wife. After an enraged Melissa starts to savagely beat him for his betrayal, Ping reveals that Yul is still alive, as the moon demons need a live human to be turned into one of them.

Despite Ping's warnings, Melissa goes after her husband, following a trail of candles to the cave where she finds the moon demons standing still waiting for Yul to bleed out. Yul has begun to transform though the process is incomplete, and he is too weak from his injuries to move. He tells Melissa the creatures are already inside his head, and she has to leave or she will be killed. They exchange a final vow of love, Melissa promising to visit Yul's relatives. She puts back on the wedding ring the villagers had taken away from Yul, then leaves the cave sobbing. Soon the moon demons begin to chase her again, but are slowed down by Ping, who sacrifices himself out of guilt to allow Melissa's escape.

Once out in the open, the creatures keep pursuing Melissa and are nearly on top of her when the moon begins to set, turning the demons into silvery dust. As the sun rises, Melissa sees Yul, fully transformed. He turns to dust.

== Cast ==
- Amy Smart as Melissa
- Tim Chiou as Yul
- Dennis Chan as Ping

== Release ==
The film was originally released on September 20, 2008 at the Austin Fantastic Fest. It was released on DVD October 6, 2009.

== Reception ==
Based on just two reviews, review aggregator Rotten Tomatoes reports that the film has a rating average of 4.9 out of 10. The more favorable of the two reviews, from Steve Barton at Dread Central, stated that "Seventh Moon is a badass and at times downright chilling little movie that deserves its rightful place in your home video collection." By contrast, David Nusair at Reelfilm felt that "Seventh Moon ultimately comes off as a missed opportunity that squanders the relatively promising nature of its setup." Elsewhere, genre critics were enthusiastic, with Film School Rejects claiming that the film was "what I Am Legend would have been without CGI. That’s a good thing." Brett Cullum of DVD Verdict called it "an inventive horror flick that reimagines the Asian ghost genre one more time." Youtube Movie Reviewer Phelan Porteous critically panned the film for its predictability, awkward and "annoyingly whiny" dialogue, shaky cam, and that it was too dark to see what was going on.
