= Haxan Films =

American film production company

- Type: Private
- Industry: Film; Television
- Founded: 1993; 33 years ago
- Founders: Eduardo Sánchez; Daniel Myrick; Gregg Hale; Michael Monello; Robin Cowie
- Headquarters: Orlando, Florida, United States
- Website: www.haxan.com

Haxan Films is an American independent film and television production company headquartered in Orlando, Florida. The company is best known for producing the horror film The Blair Witch Project. The name is taken from the 1922 Swedish/Danish silent movie Häxan ("The Witch").

== Overview ==
The company was founded in 1993 by five graduates of the University of Central Florida Film Program Eduardo Sánchez, Gregg Hale, Daniel Myrick, Robin Cowie and Michael Monello. The company sustained itself by producing television commercials and corporate videos. The Blair Witch Project was the company's first feature film, a horror film in the style of a pseudo-documentary.

Sánchez and Myrick had the idea to create their own horror film in 1993, while they were still in school. They were discussing what made horror films scary, and why there had not been any particularly scary horror film in a long time. They discussed films that scared them in their childhood, such as Chariots of the Gods (1970) and The Legend of Boggy Creek (1972). And also recalled how scary the television show In Search of... (1977–1982) was.

Sánchez concluded that what scared him in the case of films about unidentified flying objects (UFO), was the possibility that UFOs were real. He similarly found that films such as The Exorcist (1973) and The Shining (1980) were terrifying, because they played on psychological fears. He and Myrick felt that they could similarly play on their audience's psychological fears, while working with a minuscule budget.

They came up with the idea of a pseudo-documentary horror film, because they found that "cheesy" documentaries about Bigfoot were scarier than regular motion pictures, as their documentary-style suggested that they were based on reality. They wanted their audience to feel like experiencing whatever was happening to their film's characters. And that reality would be inescapable.

Their first film aimed for a sense of realism, while carefully avoiding sensationalism. The "traditional shortcomings of low-budget films" were used as one of the film's strengths, because they added to this sense of realism. They filmed events from a first-person perspective, using a Hi-8 video camera.

Sánchez and Myrick were the film's screenwriters, but actually only wrote a plot outline. They had no shooting script, and left the details of interpretation up to their actors. They created an environment for their actors, and then "let them act within those constraints."

The co-directors' original plan was to film a black-and-white 16 mm film, because they felt that the graininess of the format would feel scarier than regular video. It was producer Gregg Hale who suggested using video instead, "strictly as a financial consideration". The co-directors liked the look of the film format, but came to realize that their main character Heather could reasonably own her own Hi-8 video camera. They embraced the idea, and the use of video did not add to the film's cost. Myrick commented that "video is cheap".

The co-directors also changed their ideas on the film's narrative structure. They originally planned to film ten short scenes with the main characters, and then add "a documentary phase of the film" where the original footage would be examined. A closer examination would reveal figures standing in the background, and other creepy details. But instead of the ten planned scenes, they had 18 hours of footage and a good narrative structure within them. The scenes involving examination of the footage were shot, but were not used. The directors felt that these scenes detracted from the narrative instead of enhancing it. They finally decided to base the entire narrative on the found footage technique.

There were several documentary-style scenes filmed, but not included in the film. One involved a 1940s newsreel about killer Rustin Parr. A second one included a 1970s-documentary show called Mystic Occurrences, in imitation of In Search of.... A narrator character explained the history of the Blair Witch. A third scene involved video footage of the police, discovering the film reels, Digital Audio Tapes (DAT), and Hi-8s left behind by the missing characters. A fourth scene involved interviews with the characters' family and friends, and interviews with the police detectives handling the case. A fifth scene involved news spots.

The film's actors received training on how to use the film equipment, and how to use the Global Tracking System (GTS) in the woods. The film crew shadowed the actors' movements, but only periodically had direct contact with them. Otherwise the crew tried to stay unnoticed, allowing the actors to remain immersed in their characters. The directors were able to give way points through the GTS. They set up situations for the actors to react to, before the actors arrived in certain locations.

The actors were not informed on the content of certain scenes. For example, they were told to "Look for something in the woods.", but not what that was. When they discovered the voodoo dolls left for them, they were genuinely surprised.

The film crew supplied the actors' with additional batteries to use. Following the third day of their stay in the woods, the film crew provided the actors with additional food. To maintain minimal contact between the actors and the film crew, written notes with directions were left for the actors at the drop-off points.

The directors edited out early scenes where an angry Heather Donahue was yelling at her two co-stars, and all three actors were "cussing at each other". This took place in the actors' first night in the woods. While these scenes fit in with the eventual mood of the characters, the actors were already angry and performing them too early. The directors felt that the scenes of anger had to occur in later stages of the narrative.

The actors were chosen following an audition process, based primarily on their improvisation skills. The directors wanted actors who could think on their feet. The chosen actors were given background details on their characters, but were allowed to "bring their own personalities" when fleshing them. They could use elements of their own past for the characters, adding to the realism of the film. The real names of the actors were used for their characters, to make scenes of yelling and duress seem real to the performers.

Donahue in particular got "so far into the role and the surroundings", that she confessed to Myrick that she felt "about to lose it". She periodically needed time alone, to reflect on her personal life back in New York. Myrick called the way that the actress identified with her role as "method filmmaking", in reference to method acting.

A key scene of the film was preconceived. The character Heather eventually comes to terms with what is happening, and accepts her own fate. She also accepts responsibility for screwing up, in contrast to her previous behavior as a "ruthless bitch". Sánchez felt that the scene allowed the audience to sympathize with the character.

A confessional scene for the character Mike was also conceived, but was not used. The scene would conclude with Mike saying goodbye to his family.

John Pierson was approached to help finance the film, and viewed a tape with early footage. He initially thought that it was genuine found footage, and the directors had to explain that it was all fiction. Pierson agreed to air that tape in his television show Split Screen. He paid the filmmakers for the tape, with his money used to finance the shooting of the actual film. He also paid the filmmakers to shoot another segment for the second season of Split Screen. This also contributed to the film's budget. The filmmakers also contributed their own money to finance the film.

The production company also produced the Fox TV series FreakyLinks, and the feature films Altered (2006), Seventh Moon (2008), and Lovely Molly (2012), along with Exists (2014).

== Feature films ==
Release date	Title	Director(s)	Distributor
July 14, 1999	The Blair Witch Project	Daniel Myrick; Eduardo Sánchez	Artisan Entertainment
October 27, 2000	Book of Shadows: Blair Witch 2	Joe Berlinger	Artisan Entertainment
December 19, 2006	Altered	Eduardo Sánchez	Rogue Pictures
October 6, 2009	Seventh Moon	Eduardo Sánchez	Lionsgate; Ghost House Underground
September 14, 2011	Lovely Molly	Eduardo Sánchez	Image Entertainment
October 24, 2014	Exists	Eduardo Sánchez	Lionsgate

== Short films ==
Release date	Title	Director(s)	Notes
July 11, 1999	Curse of the Blair Witch	Daniel Myrick; Eduardo Sánchez	TV special
July 12, 2013	A Ride in the Park	Eduardo Sánchez; Gregg Hale	Segment of V/H/S/2

== Television series ==
Year	Title	Creator(s)	Network
2000–2001	FreakyLinks	Gregg Hale; Ricardo Festiva	Fox
2013	Four Corners of Fear	Michael C. Williams; Evan Ferrante	—N/a
