= The Quest (2014 TV series) =

- Genre: Fantasy/Hybrid-Reality
- Directed by: Bertram van Munster; Jack Cannon; Elise Doganieri
- Country of origin: United States
- Original language: English
- No. of seasons: 1
- No. of episodes: 10

Production
- Executive producers: Bertram van Munster; Elise Doganieri; Jane Fleming; Mark Ordesky; Michael Williams; Rob Eric
- Producers: Gregg Hale; Ady Ryf; Eduardo Sanchez
- Production locations: Vienna, Austria (ABC)
- Cinematography: Mark Kohl
- Editors: Dave Berenbaum; Erin Cumming; Mike Ellis; Jason Hujber; Rob Lawrenson; Edwin Ochmanek; Nancy Rosenbaum; Peter Steel; Scott Winlaw
- Camera setup: Multiple-camera setup
- Production companies: Court Five; Green Harbor Productions; Profiles Television Productions

Original release
- Network: ABC
- Release: July 31 – September 11, 2014

Related
- The Quest (2022 TV series)

The Quest is an American fantasy-based competition series that aired on the network ABC that premiered on July 31, 2014. Filmed on a castle estate outside Vienna, Austria, contestants face a variety of fantasy-themed challenges in the fictional land of "Everealm". The show ran for a single season, but a reboot was developed for Disney+, which premiered May 11, 2022.

== Format ==
A number of people compete in a reality competition that takes place against the backdrop of a high fantasy setting, the kingdom of Everealm. While the ongoing storyline is scripted and the contestants are interacting with actors throughout the competition, the actual challenges and eliminations are genuine and determined by the contestants' abilities and decisions.

In each episode, the contestants (called "Paladins") compete in a challenge related to events in the storyline. The winning Paladin receives a "mark" of a virtue corresponding to the challenge; it is a medal that the Paladin wears, however, this medal doesn't save them from elimination. A predetermined number of losing Paladins are subjected to a subsequent challenge (the "Fates' Challenge"), and the winner of that challenge remains safe from elimination ("banishment"). The remaining Paladins, including the winner of the Fates' Challenge, decide which of the losing Paladins should be banished; the Paladins deliberate as a group and then each publicly stands behind the Paladin he or she wishes to save from banishment. The Paladin with the least support is banished.

== Plot ==
Everealm is a magical land of twelve peacefully coexisting kingdoms that is periodically menaced by a dark power. Each time a threat to the realm appears, the three Fates summon “Paladins”, heroes from our world who are transported to Everealm. Each receives one piece of a mystical weapon called the Sunspear. The Paladins are constantly tested by the Fates under a processes that has them procedurally “banished”, one by one, until one single paladin remains. The remaining paladin is designated as the “One True Hero”, and is destined to use the Sunspear to defeat the threat.

Each Paladin receives a scroll, proclaiming that he or she is a Paladin, beckoned to save Everealm from a menace known as Verlox. The Paladins gather underground at a passageway between realities; there, the Fates explain the quest. The Paladins are sent into Everealm to find the pieces of the Sunspear and to meet their guide, Crio, a follower of the Fates who is also Royal Steward of Castle Saenctum, the stronghold of the only kingdom still resisting Verlox. The Paladins are welcomed by Queen Ralia XXIII and are trained by Sir Ansgar, who initially doubts the Paladins' worth but eventually comes to respect them. However, the Grand Vizier seems hostile to the Paladins.

== Paladins ==
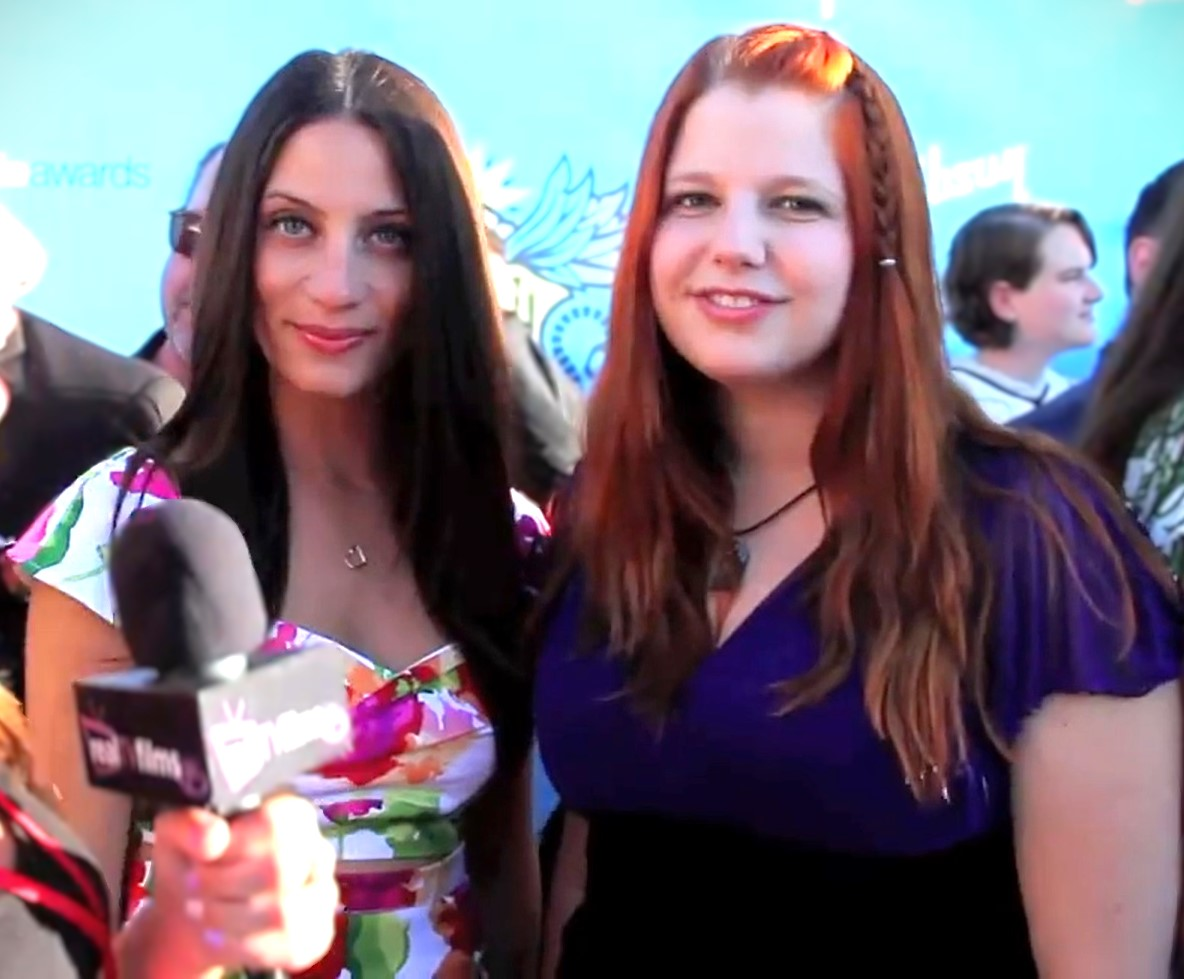
l to r: Winner Lina Carollo, Bonnie Gordon in 2014

Paladin	Finish
Katherine "Katie" Smaluk; 25, Chicago, Illinois	1st Banished; 12th Place
Ashley Guerrero; 35, Murrieta, California	2nd Banished; 11th Place
Jim Curry; 22, Little Rock, Arkansas	3rd Banished; 10th Place
Jasmine Kyle; 31, Media, Pennsylvania	4th Banished; 9th Place
Christian Sochor; 23, New York City, New York	5th Banished; 8th Place
Adria Kyne; 41, Nashua, New Hampshire	6th Banished; 7th Place
Leticia Reyes; 36, White Plains, New York	7th Banished; 6th Place
Bonnie Gordon; 28, Lafayette, Louisiana	8th Banished; 5th Place
Patrick Higgins; 40, Joliet, Illinois	9th Banished; 4th Place
Shondo Blades; 30, Houston, Texas	10th Banished; 3rd Place
Andrew Frazer; 24, West Hartford, Connecticut	11th Banished; 2nd Place
Lina Carollo; 27, Delran, New Jersey	One True Hero; Winner

== Cast ==
- Peter Windhofer as Sir Ansgar, head of the Royal Army
- Jan Hutter as Crio the Dreamer, Royal Steward of Castle Saenctum
- Marcello de Nardo as the Grand Vizier, the Queen's Chief Advisor
- Susanne Gschwendtner as Queen Ralia XXIII, Protector of Saenctum
- Stephanie Buddenbrock as Karu, one of the three Fates
- Florence Kasumba as Talmuh, one of the three Fates
- Mai Duong Kieu as Solas, one of the three Fates
- Doug Tait as Verlox/Rana Chief

== Production and filming ==
The Quest was developed by a production team who had produced The Lord of the Rings trilogy, The Amazing Race and Queer Eye. The local service company was Gebhardt Service Productions.

The series was set in the Kingdom of Saenctum and was filmed on location in Austria, for the most part at Burg Kreuzenstein, just north of Vienna. Arie Bohrer of Location Austria of The National Film Commission of Austria, said that the location was very film-friendly and had a huge courtyard which lent itself to set construction. The castle was closed to the public for a month and the furniture was moved out and replaced with props. Location Austria grants funding subsidies for scripted film and television productions, but The Quest was not eligible as reality shows are largely extemporary.

== Episodes ==
No.	Title	Original release date	Viewers (millions)
1	"The Quest Begins"	July 31, 2014	2.82
In the series premiere, the quest begins with twelve strangers who are transported from the real world into a fantasy world of heroes, magic and dangerous beasts. Becoming Paladins, they meet The Fates who tell them to retrieve an ancient weapon called the Sunspear. They follow their guide Crio, who takes them to Castle Saenctum, where their first challenge is all about teamwork. They break up into teams of three to work together handling a weapon called a scorpion. The Fates challenge presents an archery duel where each Paladin shoots an arrow in a spinning straw dummy representing their color, loading as many arrows into the opposing players dummies as they can.
2	"Tournament for the Queen"	August 7, 2014	2.19
With the battle on the front lines raging, Sir Ansgar tests the Paladins horsemanship skills in the field in front of the queen's audience. In order to move on, they must display their weapon handling techniques while riding a horse through the "gauntlet", which includes archery, a spear throw, jousting, and smashing a skull with a war hammer. Later, they dine with Queen Ralia who recounts her childhood growing up with her brother in Castle Saenctum, however, their celebration ends abruptly with a shocking situation. During the Fates challenge, keeping the theme of horses, the three Paladins have to fix five horseshoes onto a large wooden wheel.
3	"Save the Queen"	August 14, 2014	2.07
As Queen Ralia lies sick in her bed, Sir Ansgar gathers the Paladins to pore over scrolls of symptoms to find an antidote. They begin to get suspicious of the Grand Vizier—an expert of all magic and poisons in the kingdom—who claims to have run out of ideas to save the Queen. When they find the right potion, Crio takes them into the dangerous Marwood Forest where they meet the hag of Purgwal, "The Collector" who challenges them to find the potion's ingredients behind sealed doors. During the night, the castle comes under attack. In the Fates challenge, each paladin had to perfectly balance a scale by precisely measuring ingredients, placing them onto it.
4	"Battle Dome"	August 21, 2014	1.91
The Paladins hastily get ready for the oncoming castle attack, but as they mix up their armor, Sir Ansgar tells them this was just a drill and he is to blame for not training them. They do, however, train with the sword and then pick teams of three to compete against each other in the "battle dome", where they must strategize a way to knock their opponent off a raised beam and onto the ground. After the challenge, they are greeted by the surprisingly healthy-looking Queen Ralia. At night, ogres threaten to break through the outer walls. During the Fates challenge, the Paladins must focus to accurately smash the most skulls with a wooden sword.
5	"Under Siege"	August 28, 2014	1.37
The Paladins must assemble a scorpion while Sir Ansgar battles an ogre, but they are unsuccessful, yet Ansgar is able to defeat it. He then sets a challenge with the Paladins splitting into two teams of four to barricade a gate with the materials provided. Once completed, the teams use a battering ram to break through the opposing gate. The team that is successful plants their flag and is victorious. In the Fates challenge, the four losing Paladins are locked in cages and navigate a course, returning to the hall for a key. That night, the Paladins sing a song about Sir Ansgar ("Sir Ansgar the Fierce"), but soon after, face danger from Verlox's "spy orb".
6	"A Traitor in Saenctum"	August 28, 2014	1.37
When Herra, a traitor with a connection to Sir Ansgar is captured and imprisoned, the Paladins learn that he left seven fire orbs scattered around the castle grounds. Ansgar's men recover three, leaving them tasked to find the missing four. After, they follow Ansgar to observe him questioning Herra and note he feels betrayed by Herra's actions. They then investigate why he has a map of all the kingdoms and reveal their findings to Crio. At the Fates challenge, the three losing Paladins re-arrange 9 swords correctly to allow a light beam to shine upon a completed map, showing the location Verlox will attack from. Later, they celebrate with Ansgar as he opens up about his past, but are interrupted when Verlox attacks the castle.
7	"Verlox Attacks"	September 4, 2014	1.85
When the Dark Army attacks the Caste Saenctum, the Paladins catch a glimpse of Verlox for the first time. In all the chaos, Herra escapes and Vizier is conveniently in the right place, giving Queen Ralia a mysterious protection amulet. Sir Angsar leads the Paladins deep into the forest to a command post in Darvia where there are abandoned signal towers to alert the front to Verlox’s attack; their challenge. It was the female paladins versus the male paladins—one member deciphered a key code from a tower and signaled the others to place flags in a specific order to send a message to the Royal Army. During the Fates challenge, the losing Paladins had to spy on the enemy, trying to remember the most details.
8	"The Dragon's Lair"	September 4, 2014	1.85
After they see a fire-breathing dragon Verlox released from its lair, the Paladins make their way to the now-scorched town of Asper. Sir Ansgar issues a mechanical puzzle challenge by building devices with a ratchet system that lowers a gate over the exposed hole, keeping this menace locked in. As they set up camp with camouflaged tents, they confront Angsar and Crio, stating they don't trust the Grand Vizier, to which Ansgar responds that they accuse the Vizier of high treason. In the Fates challenge, Queen Ralia and Ansgar join the Paladins for their first time there, and three of them must retrieve a dragon egg out of a deep muddy pit without touching it, for it will burn their skin. At night while Crio is on watch, the Queen's amulet mysteriously lights up green.
9	"Escape from Rana Village"	September 11, 2014	1.97
The four remaining Paladins, along with Queen Ralia, Sir Ansgar and Crio are attacked for camping on the land of mutant sea creatures called "Rana". They are all captured and then brought to their village before the Rana chief alongside a hooded figure. After the Paladins try to convince the chief to let them go because among them there is the One True Hero, the mysterious figure reveals himself as the Grand Vizier, which the Paladins are not surprised by his betrayal. He has the Paladins locked up in suspended cages, which they race to break out of to free the queen, Ansgar and Crio. In the Fates challenge, three Paladins try to cross a bog to bring an offering to a wailing banshee.
10	"One True Hero"	September 11, 2014	1.97
The end draws near as the remaining three Paladins face one final test to reveal who will be the One True Hero. Their last challenge is composed of previous skill challenges of four trials. As Shondo, then Andrew falls, Lina succeeds and assembles the Sunspear. Its power brings back the banished Paladins who, along with Sir Ansgar, serve as Lina's army against Verlox's dark forces. They storm Castle Saenctum and Lina confronts Verlox, who is holding Queen Ralia and Crio hostage. She defeats Verlox as Sir Ansgar apprehends the Vizier. Following a kingdom-wide celebration, Lina and the Paladins depart for home, and the Vizier is briefly seen breaking his handcuffs while in his prison cell, setting up the plot for a potential second season.

== Game summary ==
=== Sir Ansgar's challenge results ===
Episode #:	1	2	3	4		5	6	7	8	9
Paladin	Placement									
Lina	2nd	6th	4th	3rd		1st	1st	2nd	5th	DNF
Andrew	1st	2nd	1st	1st	2nd	1st	DNF	1st	1st	1st
Shondo	2nd	1st	5th	1st	3rd	1st	3rd	1st	2nd	DNF
Patrick	4th	4th	2nd	2nd		2nd	4th	1st	3rd	DNF
Bonnie	1st	8th	DNF	2nd		2nd	2nd	2nd	4th	
Leticia	3rd	5th	7th	1st	1st	1st	DNF	2nd		
Adria	3rd	7th	3rd	3rd		2nd	DNF			
Christian	4th	11th	DNF	2nd		2nd				
Jasmine	3rd	2nd	6th	3rd						
Jim	2nd	9th	DNF							
Ashley	1st	10th								
Katie	4th									

A bold placement indicates the Paladin who received the Mark, either by placing first or being chosen by and between the winning team
An italicized placement indicates the Paladin placed in the bottom group of Sir Ansgar's challenge and, as a result, faced the Fates' challenge

=== Fates' challenge and voting results ===
Episode #:	1	2	3	4	5	6	7	8	9	10	
Banished:	Katie	Ashley	Jim	Jasmine	Christian	Adria	Leticia	Bonnie	Patrick	Shondo	Andrew
Vote:	8–2	5–4	6–2	5–2	2–2–1	3–2	4–0	2–1	1–1^{1}	None	
Paladin	Vote to save									Final result	
Lina	Katie	Christian	Christian	Saved	Adria	Leticia	Saved	Saved	Saved	One True Hero	
Andrew	Patrick	Christian	Christian	Lina	Adria	Leticia	Lina	Lina	Lina	Banished	
Shondo	Patrick	Ashley	Jim	Jasmine	Bonnie	Leticia	Lina	Lina	Patrick	Banished	
Patrick	Saved	Ashley	Christian	Lina	Bonnie	Adria	Lina	Bonnie	Banished		
Bonnie	Patrick	Christian	Christian	Lina	Saved	Adria	Lina	Banished			
Leticia	Patrick	Ashley	Christian	Jasmine	Christian	Saved	Banished				
Adria	Patrick	Ashley	Christian	Lina	Saved	Banished					
Christian	Patrick	Saved	Saved	Lina	Banished						
Jasmine	Patrick	Christian	Jim	Banished							
Jim	Patrick	Christian	Banished								
Ashley	Katie	Banished									
Katie	Banished										

^1The vote was tied between Patrick and Lina. As holder of the Mark, Andrew was to break the tie; he chose to save Lina, banishing Patrick.

Legend:

This Paladin won Sir Ansgar's challenge, earning the Mark and the sole vote in case of a tie
This Paladin lost Sir Ansgar's challenge but won the Fates' challenge
This Paladin lost both Sir Ansgar's and the Fates' challenge, but was saved from banishment
This Paladin lost both Sir Ansgar's and the Fates' challenge, and was banished

=== Marks ===
These badges are pinned on a Paladin who achieves the best performance during each of Sir Ansgar's challenges, either by placing 1st or being selected by and between the winning team. Each Mark represents a different Kingdom and the values they represent.

1. Mark of Leadership (Kingdom of Saenctum) – Awarded to Bonnie by her team for being the "eyes" of the winning team during the scorpion challenge.
2. Mark of Dexterity (Kingdom of Lluas) – Awarded to Shondo for earning the most points during the horsemanship challenge.
3. Mark of Wisdom (Kingdom of Sanare) – Awarded to Andrew for completing the potion making challenge and saving the Queen.
4. Mark of Strategy (Kingdom of Kunnacht) – Awarded to Leticia for defeating Andrew and Shondo in the finals of the battle dome challenge.
5. Mark of Ingenuity (Kingdom of Austeer) – Awarded to Lina by her team for being the smallest member of the winning team in the barricade challenge.
6. Mark of Observation (Kingdom of Glic) – Awarded to Lina for being the first Paladin to return with a Fire Orb during the retrieval challenge.
7. Mark of Intelligence (Kingdom of Faisnay) – Awarded to Patrick by his team for both being the "eyes" and strategically rotating tasks during the flag signals challenge.
8. Mark of Bravery (Kingdom of Fortiteer) – Awarded to Andrew for being the first Paladin to reassemble his ratchet system and then use it to close one of the dragon's gates during the dragon trapping challenge.
9. Mark of Strength (Kingdom of Darvia) – Awarded to Andrew for being the first Paladin to break out of the Rana's cage.

== Reception ==
=== Critical response ===
Lily Sparks of Gawker praised the show saying, "The Quest is vicarious wish fulfillment, and one of its greatest joys is witnessing the sheer unadulterated happiness on the contestant's faces. I have never seen people enjoy their time on reality TV so much, ever, and I love it." Whoopi Goldberg of The View posted on Facebook, "I love this show!" Andy Dehnart of Reality Blurred compared the show favorably to its grand predecessor, Survivor, saying, "Watching Survivor for the first time was an experience that inspired awe, its high quality and rich storytelling creating a new world that drew from familiar elements. That's how The Quest feels, and it builds in a similar way, with the context and contestants continually offering epic surprises." Geoff Berkshire of Variety commended the show for taking a risk and setting itself apart from other reality television and called it "An epic adventure." The series made numerous "Must Watch" lists including Entertainment Weekly, The Wall Street Journal, Parade Magazine, The Los Angeles Times, The New York Post, The Huffington Post, TV Guide.

=== Accolades ===
The series received a nomination for Outstanding Directorial Achievement in Reality Programs at the 2015 Directors Guild of America Awards.

=== Legacy ===
A Facebook group, known as "The Quest Army" was created by founder David Patterson as a community for discussing episodes, narratives, and topics raised by the show. In addition, he also created an online petition at change.org, calling for a renewal of the show to Robert Mills of the American Broadcasting Company.

== Reboot ==
Disney announced in January 2020 that a reboot of The Quest would be produced for its Disney+ streaming service, with van Munster and Doganieri as showrunners. van Munster had pitched the reboot to Disney after they had announced plans for the streaming service. The new version would have a similar type of narrative/reality game structure, but focus heavily on the scripted narrative, differing from the previous iteration. It would also feature primarily teenaged contestants, as van Munster stated the original show's broadcast had attracted a high teen demographic. The new version intended to film again at Burg Kreuzenstein but moved production to Castello di Amorosa in Napa Valley due to the COVID-19 pandemic. Production took place from January 2021 to March 2021.

On April 2, 2022, a trailer was released, announcing a May 11, 2022 premiere date.
