= Mark Ordesky =

American film producer

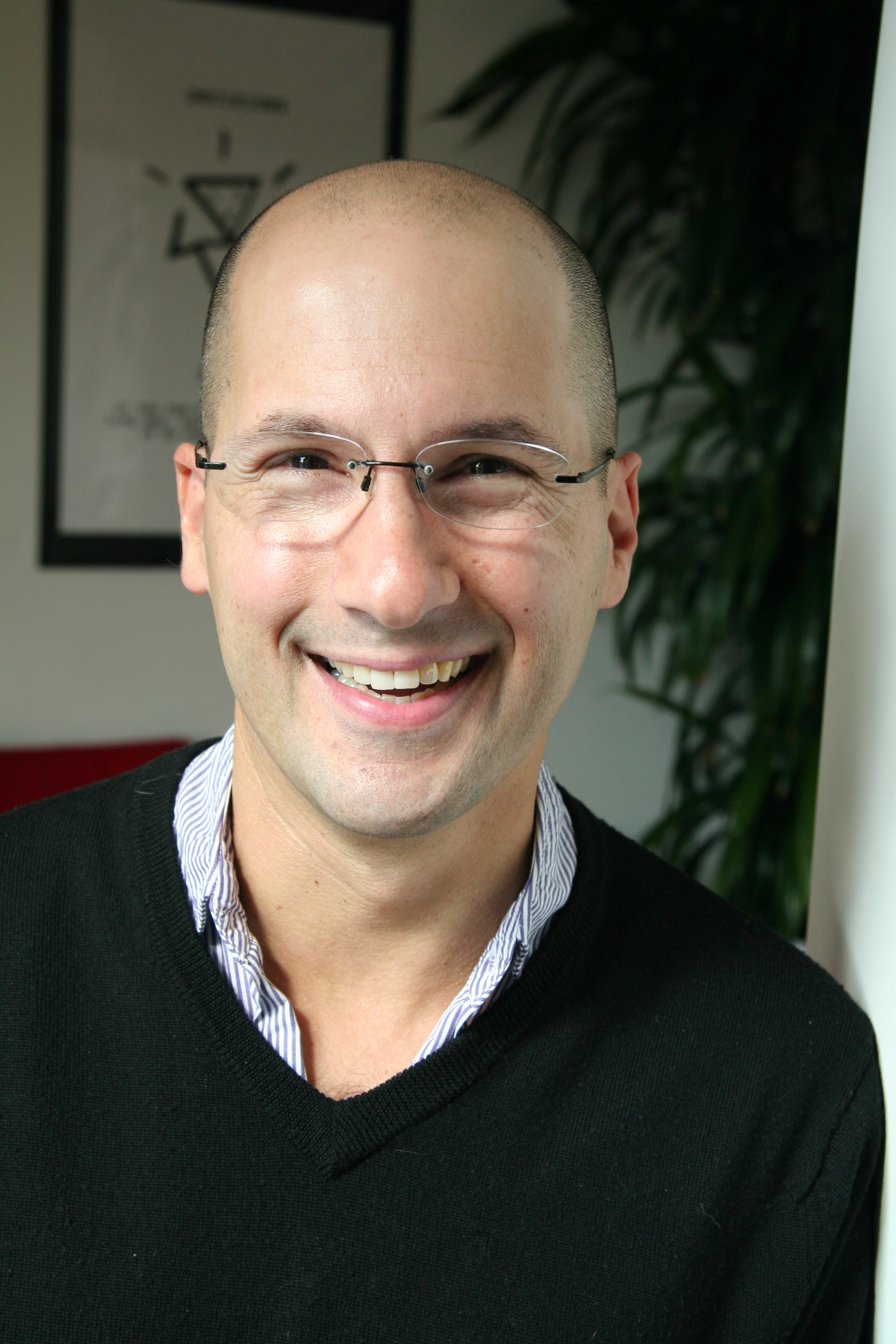
- Ordesky in 2009
- Born: Mark Lowell Ordesky; April 22, 1963 (age 62); Sacramento, California, U.S.
- Occupations: Film producer; television producer; studio executive

Mark Lowell Ordesky (born April 22, 1963) is an American film producer, television producer and studio executive. He is best known for executive producing the Oscar winning The Lord of the Rings film trilogy.

== Career ==
=== New Line Cinema ===
During 20 years at New Line Cinema (and prior to that Republic Pictures), Ordesky acquired or executive produced over 60 films, including New Line's first Best Picture Oscar nominee (Shine), its first major category Oscar winner (Geoffrey Rush, Academy Award for Best Actor, Shine), and its first Palme d'Or at the Cannes Film Festival (Lars von Trier's Dancer In The Dark).

=== The Lord of the Rings trilogy ===
While at New Line, Ordesky executive produced the entire The Lord of the Rings film trilogy. The final film of the trilogy, The Lord of the Rings: The Return of the King, made history by winning every Oscar for which it was nominated, including the Academy Award for Best Picture and Academy Award for Best Director. Collectively, the trilogy earned 17 Oscars from a total of 30 nominations, including three Best Picture nominations.

=== Fine Line Features ===
For Fine Line Features (a specialty films division of New Line), Ordesky acquired acclaimed films such as Once Were Warriors, Saving Grace, Trick, State and Main, and Ripley's Game, as well as award contenders Shine, Dancer In The Dark, Before Night Falls, Tumbleweeds, The Sweet Hereafter and American Splendor. Eight Oscar nominations and two Golden Globe nominations in total. Ordesky was Fine Line's president from 1998 to 2005.

=== Jackie Chan ===
In 1996, Ordesky helped introduce U.S. audiences to Jackie Chan with the break-out hit Rumble in the Bronx.

=== Court Five ===
Ordesky is a founding partner with former New Line Cinema executive Jane Fleming of Court Five, a media company focused on developing and converting intellectual property and brands into filmed entertainment for distribution worldwide.

== Personal life ==
Ordesky was born in Sacramento County, California. In 1985, he graduated from the USC Annenberg School for Communication with a degree in print journalism. He was editor of the university newspaper, the Daily Trojan, and joined the Chi Phi fraternity. In 2008, he was honored with Chi Phi's Walter Cronkite Congressional Award.

Ordesky supports the American Cinematheque as a board member and is also a member of the Academy of Motion Picture Arts and Sciences, Producers Guild of America, and Academy of Television Arts & Sciences.

In 2004, he married Rachel O'Connell of Wellington, New Zealand.

== Filmography ==
FILM

PRODUCER

- Critters 3 (1991): Associate producer
- Critters 4 (1991): Associate producer
- Sunset Grill (1993): Executive producer
- The Hidden II (1994): Executive producer
- Mother Night (film) (1996): Executive producer
- Mr. Nice Guy (1997): Production Executive
- Pecker (1998): Executive producer
- Roseanna's Grave (1998): Executive producer
- State and Main (2000): Co-producer
- The Lord of the Rings: The Fellowship of the Ring (2001): Executive producer
- Ripley's Game (2002): Executive producer
- The Lord of the Rings: The Two Towers (2002): Executive producer
- The Lord of the Rings: The Return of the King (2003): Executive producer
- The Sleeping Dictionary (2003): Executive producer
- A Dirty Shame (2004): Executive producer
- Birth (2004): Executive producer
- The New World (2005): Executive producer
- The Texas Chainsaw Massacre: The Beginning (2006): Executive producer
- The Golden Compass (2007): Executive producer
- Inkheart (2008): Executive producer
- Paris Connections (2010): Executive Producer
- The Long, Slow Death Of A Twenty Something (2011): Co-Executive Producer
- Tiger Eyes (film) (2012): Producer
- Lovely Molly (2012): Producer
- The Frozen Ground (2013): Producer
- Exists (film) (2014): Producer
- The Murders Of Brandywine Theater (2014): Executive Producer
- Reality High (2017): Producer
- Golden Arm (film) (2020): Executive Producer

TELEVISION

- The Quest (2014 TV series): Executive Producer
- The Quest (2022 TV series): Executive Producer

MISCELLANEOUS CREW

- Poison Ivy: The New Seduction (1997): Special thanks
- Man of the Century (1999): Thanks
- The Anniversary Party (2001): Special Thanks
- Searching For Angela Shelton (2004): Very Special Thanks
- Crystal Lake Memories: The Complete History of Friday the 13th (2013) - Starring

SECOND UNIT DIRECTING

- The Long and Short of It (2003): Second unit director
