= FreakyLinks =

- Genre: Horror; Mystery; Comedy; Science fiction
- Created by: Gregg Hale; Ricardo Festiva
- Starring: Ethan Embry
- Country of origin: United States
- Original language: English
- No. of seasons: 1
- No. of episodes: 13

Production
- Running time: 60 minutes
- Production companies: Haxan Films; Regency Television; 20th Century Fox Television

Original release
- Network: Fox
- Release: October 6, 2000 – June 22, 2001

FreakyLinks is an American science fiction series that combined elements of horror, mystery, and comedy. It was created by Gregg Hale and David S. Goyer (under the pseudonym Ricardo Festiva), and aired on Fox from October 6, 2000 until June 22, 2001, for a total run of 13 episodes. The feel of the show closely modeled that of The X-Files and other supernatural-themed shows that were popular at the time.

== Setting and plot ==
FreakyLinks centered on Derek Barnes (played by Ethan Embry), who, assisted by his friends Chloe (Lisa Sheridan) and Jason (Karim Prince), ran a website called "FreakyLinks.com" that sought out the dark and forbidden truths behind paranormal phenomena and urban legends.

Derek took over the site after his twin brother, Adam, died under mysterious circumstances. The show's episodes revolved around Derek and his friends investigating supernatural claims for the website and uncovering clues that might reveal the truth of his brother's fate.

== Cast ==
- Ethan Embry as Derek Barnes / Adam Barnes
- Lisa Sheridan as Chloe Tanner
- Karim Prince as Jason Tatum
- Lizette Carrion as Lan Williams
- Dennis Christopher as Vince J. Elsing

== Production and marketing ==
FreakyLinks, originally titled Fearsum until a few months before airing, was developed by Haxan, the creators of the film The Blair Witch Project.

Haxan decided to follow a marketing strategy similar to Blair Witch's and created a website, long before the show was set to air, called "Freakylinks.com," which was cleverly designed to look like an amateurish, home-brew website made by real-life paranormal enthusiasts.

The website was fairly successful and seemed to create some amount of "buzz," but this did not translate into high ratings when the show finally aired. The show went on hiatus for a few months before returning to the air to finish out the season, but it was not renewed for the next fall television season.

An online petition was created to ask the Fox Network to bring the show back for another season; however, this was unsuccessful.

== Legacy ==
In 2006, Lisa Sheridan reflected on the show:

“That was a blast. Probably the most fun thing about the show was that as part of the storyline, all our characters carried around video cameras wherever they went. There were portions of each script that our characters shot on video, and the show’s producers realized pretty quickly that it was far too time-consuming to have a cameraman dress up as one of us and shoot those sequences as opposed to us doing it ourselves. So little by little my fellow actors, Ethan Embry, Karim Prince, Lizette Carrion, and I wound up shooting a chunk of each episode. Funnily enough, there was a lot of improv on the show because of that. We’d be playing around with different shots and the editors would like what they saw and keep it in the show.”

Ethan Embry was also very enthusiastic about the show and said "people like it": "I had a lot of fun making it. It was the Blair Witch guys that created that show. And when we did the pilot, it was a lot darker tone-wise. It was more about suicide and the devil and the Antichrist, but when they picked it up, a new showrunner came on and they scrapped the whole devil idea and made it a little more like popcorn fare. I think that decision was fine, but they were consistently trying to figure that show out the entire time we were working on it."

== Episodes ==
No.	Title	Directed by	Written by	Original release date	Prod. code
1	"Subject: Fearsum" "Pilot"	Todd Holland	Gregg Hale & Ricardo Festiva	October 6, 2000	1AEF79
2	"Subject: Threethirteen"	Stephen Cragg	Michael R. Perry	October 13, 2000	1AEF02
3	"Subject: Edith Keeler Must Die"	David Straiton	Juan Carlos Coto	October 20, 2000	1AEF03
4	"Subject: Coelacanth This!"	Jef Levy	Russel Friend & Garrett Lerner	October 27, 2000	1AEF01
5	"Subject: Desert Squid! Myth or Legend?"	Scott Lautanen	Russel Friend & Garrett Lerner	November 3, 2000	1AEF04
6	"Subject: The Harbingers"	Jay Tobias	Juan Carlos Coto	January 5, 2001	1AEF05
7	"Subject: Still I Rise"	Joe Napolitano	Adisa Iwa	January 12, 2001	1AEF06
8	"Subject: Me and My Shadow"	Thomas Wright	Mark Verheiden	January 19, 2001	1AEF07
9	"Subject: The Stone Room"	David Grossman	Juan Carlos Coto	January 26, 2001	1AEF08
10	"Subject: Live Fast, Die Young"	David Barrett	Michael R. Perry	June 1, 2001	1AEF10
11	"Subject: Police Siren"	Randy Miller	Adisa Iwa	June 8, 2001	1AEF11
12	"Subject: Sunrise at Sunset Streams"	Bill Norton	Russel Friend & Garrett Lerner	June 15, 2001	1AEF09
13	"Subject: The Final Word"	David Straiton	Mark Verheiden	June 22, 2001	1AEF12
