= Orobas =

Goetic demon

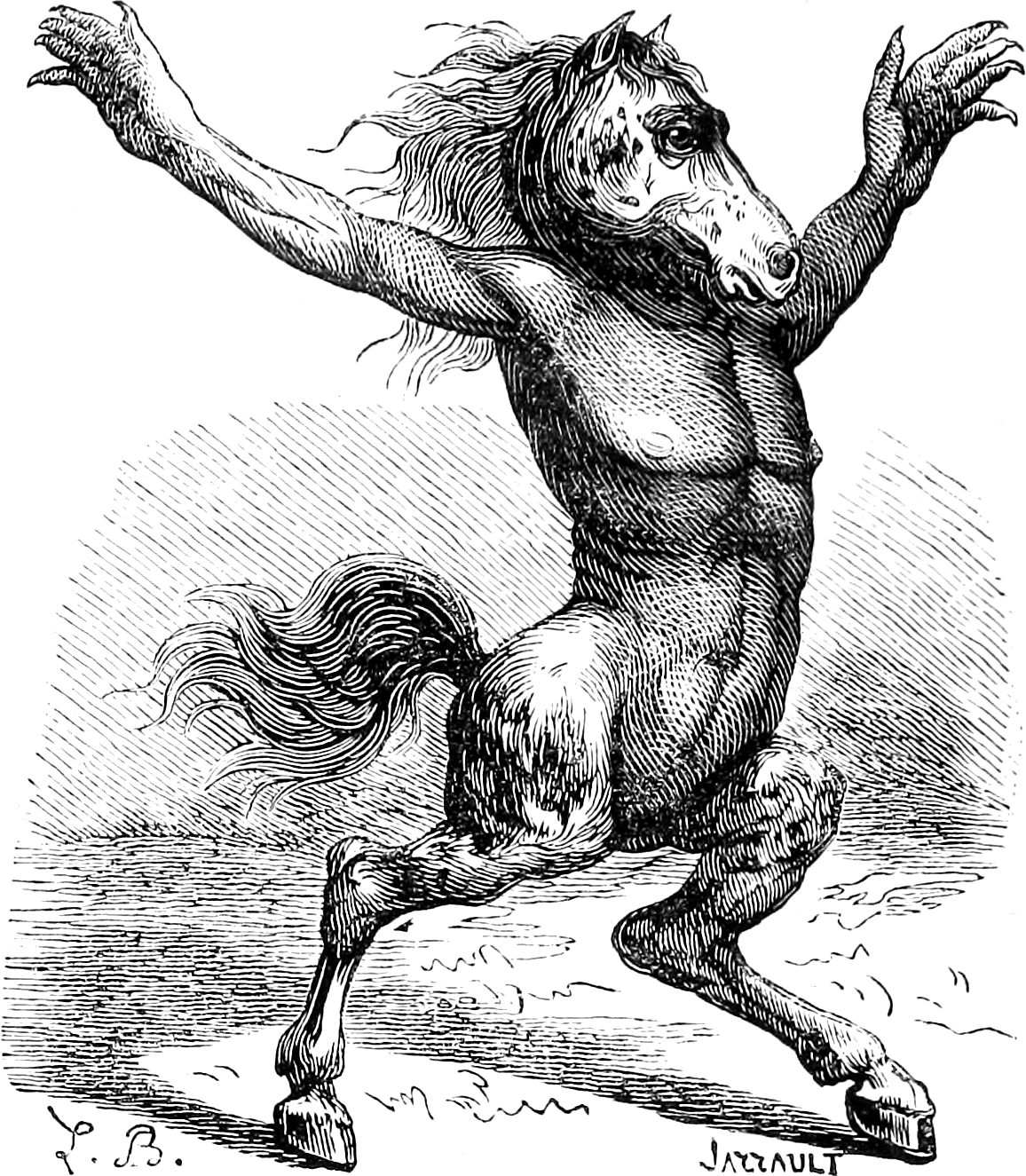
Orobas as illustrated by Louis Le Breton for Jacques Collin de Plancy's Dictionnaire Infernal (1863).

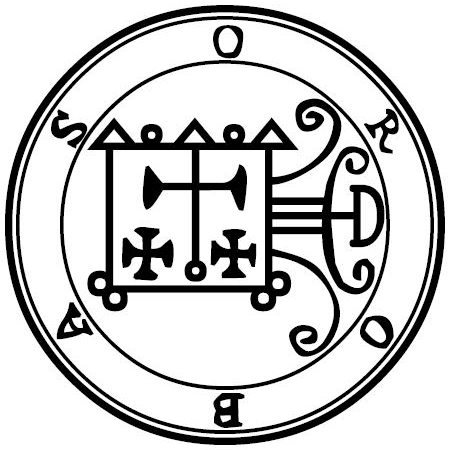
The seal of Orobas as given in the goetic tradition.

In demonology, Orobas is a figure of the Ars Goetia, the first book of the Lemegeton or Lesser Key of Solomon. In that tradition, he is described as a Great Prince of Hell commanding twenty legions of spirits. He also appears in Johann Weyer's Pseudomonarchia daemonum, indicating that the figure belongs to an earlier demonological tradition later incorporated into the goetic corpus.

== Textual tradition ==
The Lemegeton is a seventeenth-century compilation drawing on older sources, and the Ars Goetia is widely understood to depend in part on Weyer's earlier catalogue of spirits. Orobas is therefore part of a textual tradition that predates the better-known English occult editions of the twentieth century.

In the Ars Goetia, Orobas is the fifty-fifth spirit of the catalogue. He is said to appear first in the form of a horse and, at the command of the exorcist, to assume human form. The text attributes to him the power to reveal things past, present, and to come; to answer questions concerning divinity and the creation of the world; to grant dignities and prelacies; and to procure the favour of both friends and foes.

In Weyer's Pseudomonarchia daemonum, Orobas is likewise described as a great prince who appears as a horse before assuming the image of a man. There too he is associated with truthful answers, dignities and prelacies, the favour of friends and foes, and rule over twenty legions.

== Characterisation ==
Among the spirits of the Ars Goetia, Orobas is notable for the comparatively favourable way in which he is described. The grimoire tradition explicitly portrays him as truthful, faithful to the conjurer, and unwilling to permit deception or temptation by other spirits. For this reason, later occult readers have often regarded him as one of the more dependable figures in the goetic hierarchy.

== Name ==
The etymology of the name Orobas is uncertain. Some later sources connect it with the Latin term orobias, sometimes glossed as a type of incense, though this derivation is not universally established.

== Iconography ==
The early grimoire tradition describes Orobas primarily through his equine manifestation and subsequent transformation into human form. In later visual culture, however, the figure acquired a more fixed iconography. The best-known image is the nineteenth-century illustration published in Jacques Collin de Plancy's Dictionnaire Infernal (1863), engraved after designs by Louis Le Breton.

== Reception ==
Orobas has remained one of the more recognizable spirits of the goetic tradition in modern occultism, owing both to the widespread circulation of printed editions of the Goetia and to the enduring influence of the illustrated Dictionnaire Infernal.

== In popular culture ==
In Eduardo Sánchez's film Lovely Molly (2011), the demonic figure at the end of the film resembles Orobas in its horse-headed anthropomorphic form.

== See also ==
- Ars Goetia
- Lemegeton
- Pseudomonarchia daemonum
- Dictionnaire Infernal
