= The Frozen Ground =

2013 American thriller film by Scott Walker

- Release poster
- Directed by: Scott Walker
- Written by: Scott Walker
- Produced by: Curtis Jackson; Randall Emmett; George Furla; Mark Ordesky; Jane Fleming
- Starring: Nicolas Cage; John Cusack; 50 Cent; Vanessa Hudgens
- Cinematography: Patrick Murguia
- Music by: Lorne Balfe
- Production companies: Grindstone Entertainment Group; Cheetah Vision; Court Five; Emmett/Furla Films
- Distributed by: Lionsgate
- Release dates: July 19, 2013 (United Kingdom); August 23, 2013 (United States)
- Running time: 105 minutes
- Country: United States
- Language: English
- Budget: $19.2 million
- Box office: $5.6 million

The Frozen Ground is a 2013 American crime thriller film written and directed by Scott Walker, in his directorial debut, starring Nicolas Cage, John Cusack, Vanessa Hudgens, Katherine LaNasa, Radha Mitchell, and 50 Cent. Based on the crimes of the real-life Alaskan serial killer Robert Hansen, the film depicts an Alaskan State Trooper seeking to apprehend Hansen by partnering with a young woman who escaped from Hansen's clutches.

The film was released in select theaters and directly to video on demand on August 23, 2013, and received mixed reviews from critics. Cage's performance was praised.

== Plot ==
In an Anchorage motel room in 1983, 17-year-old Cindy Paulson (Vanessa Hudgens) is handcuffed and screaming for help. She is rescued by an Anchorage Police Department patrol officer. He takes Paulson to the hospital, and her clothes are kept for a rape kit. At an APD station, she explains to detectives that she was abducted and raped. Because she is a prostitute and lying about her age, the detectives do not believe her story, refusing to even look into the man whom she named as her abductor, Robert Hansen (John Cusack). They claim Hansen is an upstanding member of society, a family man who owns his own restaurant, with alibis from three people.

The APD patrol officer who rescued Paulson is outraged that the detectives refuse to pursue Hansen. He surreptitiously photocopies information about the case and sends it to the Alaska State Troopers. Meanwhile, state trooper Jack Halcombe (Nicolas Cage) has been called to investigate a female body that was found in the bush, half eaten by bears. The police connect the case to other missing girls, who have disappeared after going to what they thought were legitimate photo shoots. With secret information from the APD officer, Halcombe connects the other cases to Paulson's and begins constructing a profile of Hansen. Paulson details how Hansen kept her captive and that she escaped from his car when he tried to transfer her to his bush plane.

Meanwhile, in Anchorage, Debbie Peters gets picked up by a man in an RV for a photo shoot. Later, Hansen eats a quiet dinner at home. His wife and children are away, and Hansen relaxes in his trophy room, casually ignoring Peters who is chained to a post. She has urinated on the floor, and as she cleans up the mess with a towel, Hansen's neighbor enters the house to deliver a plate of food. Hansen warns Peters not to scream and leaves the trophy room to greet his neighbor. Hansen then takes Peters to the airport, where he orders her into his plane. After landing in a remote spot in the bush, Hansen frees Peters, letting her run in a panic through the woods before he shoots her with a .223 caliber rifle. He steals her necklace before finishing her off with a handgun.

Halcombe has a very difficult time assembling a case against Hansen. Because the evidence is circumstantial and Paulson is afraid to testify, the district attorney refuses to issue a search warrant. Paulson keeps falling back into the world of stripping and prostitution, despite Halcombe's efforts to keep her safe. At a strip club, while she is trying to sell lap dances, she notices Hansen trawling for a new victim. Their eyes meet, a chase ensues, and Paulson barely escapes. The encounter makes Hansen nervous, and he hires Carl Galenski to find and kill Paulson. Carl approaches Paulson's erstwhile pimp Clate Johnson (50 Cent) and offers to forgive his sizable debt if Clate turns Paulson over to him.

Halcombe stakes out Hansen's house, causing Hansen to panic. Hansen gathers the evidence of his crimes, including the keepsakes from his victims, and flees with his son to the airport. Despite dangerous flying conditions, he flies his plane to the bush and hides his keepsakes.

Feeling that the chance to catch Hansen is slipping away, and with the victim count now at 17 girls, Halcombe forces the DA to issue a warrant. The search of Hansen's house yields no evidence, not even in his trophy room. Hansen agrees to be interrogated without a lawyer, but he is not yielding any new evidence. Halcombe arrests Hansen, but unless the police find new evidence, they will be unable to hold him.

Halcombe orders a second search of Hansen's house, which turns up a hidden cache of guns, including the .223 caliber rifle used in many of the murders. Under police watch at a safe location, Paulson slips away and returns to her life of prostitution. Clate delivers her to Carl. When Clate attempts to rob Carl, Paulson uses the opportunity to escape, with Carl in pursuit after killing Clate. After making a call to Halcombe, Paulson is almost killed by Carl, but Halcombe rescues her just in time.

Halcombe uses a bracelet identical to one worn by one of the victims to trick Hansen into thinking the police have found the evidence he'd hidden in the bush. The bracelet, combined with the sight of Paulson in the interrogation room, enrages Hansen to the point that he incriminates himself.

The epilogue states that Hansen confessed to the murders of 17 women, and the kidnappings and rapes of another 30. He was charged with the abduction and rape of Cindy Paulson, and the murders of Joanna Messina, Sherry Morrow, Paula Goulding, and "Eklutna Annie". He was sentenced to 461 years plus life without parole.

The film ends with a dedication to and photographs of Hansen's victims.

== Cast ==
- Nicolas Cage as Jack Halcombe (inspired by Glenn Flothe)
- John Cusack as Robert Hansen
- Vanessa Hudgens as Cindy Paulson
- 50 Cent as Clate Johnson
- Radha Mitchell as Allie Halcombe (inspired by Cherry Flothe)
- Jodi Lyn O'Keefe as Chelle Ringell
- Dean Norris as Sgt. Lyle Haugsven
- Katherine LaNasa as Fran Hansen
- Matt Gerald as Ed Stauber
- Robert Forgit as Sgt. Wayne Von Clasen
- Sam Velasquez as Jimmy Garcia
- Ryan O'Nan as Gregg Baker
- Kurt Fuller as D.A. Pat Clives
- Kevin Dunn as Lt. Bob Jent
- Mark Smith as Head of Security
- Gia Mantegna as Debbie Peters
- Michael McGrady as Vice Det. John Gentile
- Brad William Henke as Carl Galenski
- Bostin Christopher as Al
- Taylor Tracy as Sandy Halcombe
- Ron Holmstrom as Attorney Mike Rule
- Jill Bess as Janet

== Production ==
The film was shot in 26 days, entirely in Alaska. Writer/director Scott Walker delayed shooting for five months so he could shoot the film on the cusp of fall into winter, so he could achieve a look and feel of the film starting with no snow and ending in the deep of winter. He has said he literally wanted the feel of the weather closing in and around the story, and freezing the case. As a result of shooting at this time of year, by the end of 26 days' filming there were 3 1/2 hours less daylight per day than when filming began.

== Release ==
=== Critical reception ===
On Rotten Tomatoes, the film holds an approval rating of 61% based on 57 reviews, with an average rating of 5.2/10. The website's critics consensus reads: "Though this by-the-numbers true procedural seems basic, The Frozen Ground presents a welcome return for Nicolas Cage in a solid performance." Metacritic assigned the film a weighted average score of 37 out of 100, based on 16 critics, indicating "generally unfavorable reviews".

=== Accolades ===
Cage won the Ischia Legend Award at Ischia Global Film & Music Festival.

=== Renewed popularity ===
In August 2020, the film was added to Netflix and quickly became the number one most streamed movie the week of September 5, 2020, joining an emerging crop of other feature films which have received lukewarm receptions upon their initial release only to garner surprising new attention when added to the streaming platform.
