= Brad William Henke =

American actor (1966–2022)

- Publicity photo of Henke
- Born: April 10, 1966; Columbus, Nebraska, U.S.
- Died: November 29, 2022 (aged 56)
- Occupations: Actor; American football player
- Years active: 1989–1994 (football); 1994–2022 (acting)
- Spouses: Katelin Chesna (m. 2001–2008): Sonja Henke
- Football career

No. 68
- Position: Defensive end

Personal information
- Listed height: 6 ft 3 in (1.91 m)
- Listed weight: 275 lb (125 kg)

Career information
- High school: Heritage (Littleton, Colorado)
- College: Arizona (1987–1988)
- NFL draft: 1989: 4th round, 105th overall pick

Career history
- New York Giants (1989)*; Denver Broncos (1989); Fort Worth Cavalry (1994)
- * Offseason or practice squad member only
- Stats at Pro Football Reference
- Stats at ArenaFan.com

Brad William Henke (April 10, 1966 – November 29, 2022) was an American actor and professional football player in the National Football League (NFL) and Arena Football League (AFL). He was best known for his role as Corrections Officer Desi Piscatella on Orange Is the New Black, for which he won the Screen Actors Guild Award for Outstanding Performance by an Ensemble in a Comedy Series in 2016.

== Early life and education ==
Henke was born in Columbus, Nebraska. He attended the University of Arizona and played football as a defensive lineman.

== Career ==
=== Football career ===
Pre-draft measurables
Height	Weight	40-yard dash	10-yard split	20-yard split	20-yard shuttle	Vertical jump
6 ft 3 1/8 in (1.91 m)	263 lb (119 kg)	4.92 s	1.69 s	2.84 s	4.31 s	32.5 in (0.83 m)
All values from NFL Combine

Henke was drafted by the New York Giants in the 1989 NFL draft but got cut during training camp. He was picked up by the Denver Broncos, and he played in Super Bowl XXIV against the San Francisco 49ers. Repeated injuries, which required six ankle surgeries, led to his retirement from professional football in 1994.

=== Acting ===
Henke began acting in 1994, starting with commercials. He appeared in October Road, Around June, The Amateurs, World Trade Center, In the Valley of Elah, Choke, Sherrybaby, Must Love Dogs and Fury.

His television career includes roles in Arliss, Criminal Minds,ER, Dexter, Lost, Justified, The Office, Orange Is the New Black, Sneaky Pete, Grimm, Big Sky, and MacGyver (2016).

Henke's breakout role was on Orange Is the New Black as Desi Piscatella, a gay corrections officer at Litchfield Federal Penitentiary. He joined OITNB in the fourth season. He was part of the cast that won the Screen Actors Guild Award for Outstanding Performance by an Ensemble in a Comedy Series for 2016.

== Personal life and death ==
Henke was married to actress Katelin Chesna from 2001 to 2008.

In an Instagram post dated May 15, 2021, Henke stated that he had a 90 percent blockage of an artery. In another post dated June 29, 2021, he stated that he had two stents put in his heart and that his spleen and half of his pancreas were removed to treat a "golf ball sized" tumor.

Henke died in his sleep on November 29, 2022, at the age of 56.

== Filmography ==
=== Film ===
Year	Title	Role	Notes
1996	Mr. Wrong	Bob	
1996	Space Jam	Stars Catcher	
1996	The Fan	Tjader	
1999	Dill Scallion	Bartender	
1999	The Thirteenth Floor	Cop #1	
2000	Gone in 60 Seconds		Uncredited
2003	Love Object	Dotson	Credited as Brad Henke
2004	The Assassination of Richard Nixon	Martin Jones	
2005	Must Love Dogs	Leo	
2005	The Amateurs	Ron	
2005	North Country	Mr. Lattavansky	
2005	Me and You and Everyone We Know	Andrew	
2006	Sherrybaby	Bobby Swanson	
2006	World Trade Center	Allison's brother	
2006	Hollywoodland	Russ Taylor	
2006	Altered	Duke	
2008	Choke	Denny	
2008	Around June	Henry	
2009	Short Term 12	Denim	Later adapted into the 2013 film
2010	The Space Between	Will	
2011	The Trouble with Bliss	Steven 'Jetski' Jouseski	Also known as East Fifth Bliss
2011	Magic Valley	Jerry Garabrant	
2012	I Am Not a Hipster	Bradley Haines	
2012	Struck by Lightning	Principal Gifford	
2013	Jobs	Paul Terrell	
2013	Pacific Rim	Construction foreman	
2013	The Frozen Ground	Carl Galenski	
2014	Draft Day	Tony 'Bagel' Bagli	
2014	Fury	Sgt. Davis	Credited as Brad Henke
2015	Pure Love	Detective Dillard	
2016	The Tank	Dane Hankeard	
2016	Pee-wee's Big Holiday	Grizzly Bear Daniels	
2016	Split	John Cooke	
2017	Bright	Dorghu	
2018	Cold Brook	Chip	
2019	Wounds	Eric	
2019	Inherit the Viper	Tedd Wallace	
2020	Arkansas	Tim	
2022	The Ray	Billings	
2022	Block Party	Buddy Frank	

=== Television ===
Year	Title	Role	Notes
1996	Chicago Hope	Freddy Lulenski	Episode: "Papa's Got a Brand New Bag"
1996	Silk Stalkings	Amos Alexander	Episode: "Loyalty"
1996–1997	Nash Bridges	P.J. Pollard / Tommy	2 episodes
1997	Arliss	Zack Bowers	Episode: "A Full Service Agency"
1997	Michael Hayes	Billy Desmore	Episode: "Heroes"
1998	ER	John	Episode: "Think Warm Thoughts"
1998	The Pretender	Jimbo	Episode: "Crazy"
1998	Sports Night	Christian Patrick	Episode: "Mary Pat Shelby"
1998	To Have & to Hold	Christopher Dimatto	Episode: "Hope You Had the Time of Your Wife"
1999	Pensacola: Wings of Gold	Wayne	Episode: "Lost"
1999	Martial Law	Buzz Tippitt	Episode: "Breakout"
2000–2001	Going to California	Henry "Hank" Ungalow	20 episodes
2000	The Michael Richards Show	Tommy	Episode: "The Identity Loan"
2002	Crossing Jordan	Andy Lebowski	Episode: "Secrets & Lies: Part 2"
2002	Providence	Luke English	Episode: "Cloak & Dagger"
2002	Judging Amy	Det. Chris Cross	2 episodes
2003	CSI: Crime Scene Investigation	George Bartell	Episode: "Fur and Loathing"
2006	Dexter	Tony Tucci	4 episodes
2007	Cold Case	Mike Chulaski	Episode: "Cargo"
2008	Law & Order	Ted Sanderson	Episode: "Strike"
2008	Life on Mars	Michael H., the Hostage Taker	Episode: "Tuesday's Dead"
2007–2008	October Road	Owen Dennis Rowan	19 episodes
2009–2010	Lost	Bram	6 episodes
2009	Trust Me	Lewis	Episode: "Odd Man Out"
2009	CSI: Miami	Arnold Hollings	Episode: "Out of Time"
2009	Solving Charlie	Tom Taylor	Television film
2010	Party Down	Travis	Episode: "Steve Guttenberg's Birthday"
2010	Royal Pains	Roy	Episode: "Whole Lotto Love"
2011	Criminal Minds	Steve	Episode: "Sense Memory"
2011	Shameless	Hal Hollander	Episode: "Daddyz Girl"
2011	Justified	Coover Bennett	9 episodes
2011	Grimm	Hap Lasser	Episode: "The Three Bad Wolves"
2011	The Chicago Code	Ernie Moosekian	3 episodes
2011	Memphis Beat	Mark Aiden	Episode: "Identity Crisis"
2012	Bones	Melvin Carville	Episode: "The Bod in the Pod"
2013	The Office	Frank	Episode: "Vandalism"
2013	Castle	Mark Heller	Episode: "Scared to Death"
2013	Longmire	Sal Vayas	Episode: "Death Came In Like Thunder"
2013–2014	The Bridge	Jim Dobbs	4 episodes
2015	Uncle	Background Singer	Episode: " I'm Back"
2015	Hawaii Five-0	Richie Malloy	Episode: "Luapo'i"
2016–2018	Orange Is the New Black	Desi Piscatella	26 episodes
2016	The Night Shift	Clayton Timmons	Episode: "Between a Rock and a Hard Place"
2017	Sneaky Pete	Brendon	6 episodes
2018	MacGyver	Jonah Walsch	Episode: "MacGyver + MacGyver"
2020	Manhunt: Deadly Games	Big John	4 episodes
2020	The Stand	Tom Cullen	6 episodes
2022	Law & Order: Special Victims Unit	Captain Don Kubiak	Episodes: "Once Upon a Time in El Barrio"
