= Charles Harpole =

- Born: Charles Henry Harpole
- Education: New York University
- Occupations: Scholar, educator, filmmaker, writer

Charles Henry Harpole is a scholar of cinema and mass communications and a filmmaker. He received his doctorate from New York University and has taught at the University of Georgia, New York University, the New School, Southern Illinois University, the University of Texas at Dallas, Ohio State University, the University of Central Florida, and Mahidol University.

He was chairperson of the Cinema and Photography Department at Ohio State University and was founding Head of the Film School at U. C. F. He was recruited to Thailand to start the film, television, and animation B.A. program at Mahidol University (co-sponsored by Kantana studios). Harpole retired from Mahidol University in September 2011.

Harpole founded and led the Cinema History Project which created a ten-volume "History of American Cinema" book series, published by Charles Scribner Sons and by the University of California Press, and held in over 600 WorldCat libraries. He is the author of Gradients of Depth in the Cinema Image, published by Arno Press, and producer, director, writer and editor of documentary videos, primarily about Tibetan Buddhism by shooting in India, Nepal, Tibet (China), Bhutan, Thailand, Laos and the USA. He has made programming for the Children's Television Workshop (Sesame Street) and has contributed to MSNBC, BBC, CNN and PBS.

His students include Frederick Marx and Steve James (Hoop Dreams), Milčo Mančevski (Before the Rain), and the creatives who made The Blair Witch Project (including Eduardo Sánchez). Harpole has taught over 11,000 students in his 30+ teaching career. His documentary and entertainment videos are on his YouTube channel, k4vud, including video testimony of Red Chinese atrocities on Tibetans.

Harpole is an amateur radio operator; his call sign is K4VUD.
