= Lovely Molly =

2011 American film

- Theatrical release poster
- Directed by: Eduardo Sánchez
- Written by: Eduardo Sánchez; Jamie Nash
- Story by: Eduardo Sánchez
- Produced by: Robin Cowie; Jane Fleming; Gregg Hale; Mark Ordesky
- Starring: Gretchen Lodge; Johnny Lewis; Alexandra Holden; Lauren Lakis
- Cinematography: John W. Rutland
- Edited by: Eduardo Sánchez
- Music by: Tortoise
- Production companies: Amber Entertainment; Haxan Films
- Distributed by: Image Entertainment
- Release date: September 14, 2011
- Running time: 100 minutes
- Country: United States
- Language: English
- Budget: $1 million
- Box office: $638,274

Lovely Molly is a 2011 American supernatural horror film directed by Eduardo Sánchez, co-written by Sánchez and Jamie Nash, and produced by Haxan Films, the production company behind The Blair Witch Project (1999). The film initially had a working title of The Possession before being retitled.

The plot follows newlyweds Molly and Tim Reynolds as they move into Molly's childhood home, where repressed memories of abuse and a malevolent demonic presence begin to unravel Molly's sanity. The film stars Gretchen Lodge in her feature film debut, alongside Johnny Lewis and Alexandra Holden.

Lovely Molly blends found footage and conventional cinematography, and its score was composed by the post-rock band Tortoise. It premiered at the Tribeca Film Festival in 2011 and was released theatrically in the United States in May 2012 by Image Entertainment. Critical reception was mixed, with a 46% rating on Rotten Tomatoes, though several critics praised Lodge's "transformative performance" and favourable comparisons were drawn to Roman Polanski's Repulsion (1965).

== Plot ==
The film opens with a video recording of Molly apologizing for her actions and attempting to slit her throat with a knife. The date is October 16, 2011, and much of the film is revealed in flashback.

Tim (Johnny Lewis) and Molly get married and move into Molly's childhood home. Strange happenings in the house soon plague the couple. Tim has to leave town for a few days, leaving Molly, a recovering heroin addict, alone. The film reveals a hidden underground shrine in the shed. In her childhood room, Molly hears crying in her closet. Upon Tim's return, he discovers Molly naked and staring blankly into a corner of the bedroom, appearing delusional.

Molly begins to record their neighbors, a little girl and her mother who live nearby. She encounters paranormal forces in the house and at work, where she hears a man singing the traditional song "Lovely Molly." The next day, Molly's boss shows her the surveillance camera footage, which shows Molly completely alone putting down her pants and jerking in a sexual manner against the wall. In reply, Molly cries out that she was in fact sexually assaulted by somebody she couldn't see as he was behind her. Molly becomes hysterical and is sent home. Her condition becomes worse as she films and talks to a dead deer, and attempts to seduce the local pastor. Fearing for her safety, Tim takes her to the doctor, but she is healthy. That night, Molly attacks Tim and bites his lips, nearly pulling them off. Terrified, Tim calls Molly's sister Hannah. In the basement, Hannah finds that Molly has been keeping a rotting deer that she stabs, screaming that their father told her Hannah killed him. Hannah says that she was protecting herself and the young Molly from their father, and asks Molly to come live with her. Molly giggles, saying that if she does, her father will kill Hannah's son Peter.

Molly continues secretly filming the neighbor. As a distraught Tim sits with the young girl's mother on the couch, it is clear they are familiar, and she performs oral sex on him. Pastor Bobby visits Molly, who emerges naked, and the two embrace. Shortly afterward, Pastor Bobby is seen in the bathtub, dead and covered in bites. Tim goes home and finds the video camera playing, showing a recording of himself with the neighbor. Molly strikes him and kills him by stabbing him in the head with a screwdriver, the same way Pastor Bobby was killed. The police are later seen in the woods digging to reveal the body of the young girl as the mother sobs. Molly leaves the site and lies naked and sobbing on the floor until her attitude abruptly changes and she smiles. She walks out naked toward a tall figure with glowing eyes, a horse head, and the body of a man (resembling the demon Orobas).

In the aftermath, the couple's house is up for sale. Time has passed with no answer as to Molly's whereabouts or her disappearance. In their old bedroom, Hannah finds the family photo album on the floor. In it, she sees that their father's face has been covered with horse heads from his frame collection. Hearing a noise from the closet, she opens it and in a trance-like state reaches towards something unseen, similar to Molly's discovery earlier.

== Production ==
=== Development ===
Lovely Molly was written and directed by Eduardo Sánchez, from a story by Jamie Nash, and produced by Haxan Films and Amber Entertainment—the same production company behind The Blair Witch Project. Producers included Robin Cowie and Gregg Hale—both veterans of The Blair Witch Project—alongside Jane Fleming and Mark Ordesky. The film's estimated budget was approximately $1,000,000.

=== Filming ===
Principal photography began in late 2010 in Hagerstown, Maryland, with Dahlgren Chapel serving as one of the key locations. Sánchez described lead actress Gretchen Lodge — making her feature film debut — as one of the bravest performers he had ever worked with, particularly given the film's numerous physically and emotionally demanding scenes.

=== Style ===
The film employs a hybrid visual approach, blending handheld found footage sequences shot by the protagonist with conventionally photographed scenes, a technique Sánchez had pioneered on The Blair Witch Project. This ambiguity between subjective and objective reality reinforces the film's central uncertainty about whether Molly's experiences are supernatural or the product of psychological trauma.

=== Release ===
The film premiered in the Midnight Madness section of the Toronto International Film Festival in September 2011, following which Content Film acquired international distribution rights. It was released theatrically in the United States in May 2012 by Image Entertainment.

== Cast ==
- Gretchen Lodge as Molly Reynolds
- Johnny Lewis as Tim Reynolds
- Alexandra Holden as Hannah
- Ken Arnold as Samuels
- Field Blauvelt as Pastor Bobby
- Kevin Murray as Ron Hensley
- Lauren Lakis as Lauren
- Daniel Ross as Victor

== Production ==
Filming for Lovely Molly began in late 2010 in Hagerstown, Maryland, with Dahlgren Chapel being one of the locations filmed.

Talking about the nude scenes, Eduardo Sánchez said Gretchen Lodge was one of the bravest actors he has ever encountered.

== Soundtrack ==
The score for Lovely Molly was composed by the Chicago-based post-rock band Tortoise and recorded at John McEntire's Soma Electronic Music Studios. The title track "Lovely Molly" is an arrangement of the folk song "Courting is a Pleasure" (Roud 454), a traditional emigration ballad that has been recorded by artists such as The Stanley Brothers (in 1961), Norma Waterson (in 1977), and Nic Jones (in 1980). The film also contains the song "Wish I May", by the American heavy metal band Breaking Benjamin.

== Reception ==
Critical reception for Lovely Molly was mixed, with the film holding a 46% "rotten" rating on Rotten Tomatoes based on 37 ratings.

Lovely Molly received positive reviews from The New York Times and the A.V. Club, with the latter praising Gretchen Lodge's performance and favorably comparing the film to Roman Polanski's Repulsion (1965). Little White Lies also praised both Lodge's "transformative performance" and Sánchez's "challengingly ambiguous" tone, while Toronto.com wrote that "there’s just enough of the right stuff in Lovely Molly – a pervasive sense of dread, an implacably evil presence and a doomed heroine – to leave a haunting and lasting impression."

The Globe and Mail panned the film, writing that "Some of the shock effects in Lovely Molly are successfully disorienting, but too many of its ideas are reductive and histrionic." The Newark Star-Ledger also criticized the film, claiming that it represented "stuff we’ve seen before." The Guardian gave the film two stars, stating that "the film presents us with too many unearned revelations, and it unravels."

According to Horror News, "Extremely impressive, 'Lovely Molly' is a hit for 2012".
