= Jane Fleming (producer) =

American film producer

Jane Harvey Fleming is an American film producer and television producer. She was born in New York City, the youngest daughter of Jane (1933–1990), a philanthropist, and Peter E. Fleming Jr. (1929–2009), a criminal-defense lawyer.

A graduate of Princeton University in 1989, Fleming's screen credits include Lovely Molly, The Frozen Ground, Exists (film) and the Disney+ television series The Quest (2022 TV series).

While at Princeton, Fleming won the 1988 National Championship for lightweight crew

Fleming began her career as a financial analyst in Mergers and Acquisitions at the investment banks Drexel Burnham Lambert and James D. Wolfensohn Incorporated. She later joined New Line Cinema, where she ultimately rose to the position of Senior Vice President, Business Development.

A long-time and passionate advocate for women's rights, Fleming is a former two-term president of Women in Film, Los Angeles (2006–2010). She currently serves as its President Emeritus and co-CFO. As part of her advocacy, she is one of fifty Hollywood leaders dedicated to tackling gender inequality as part of the ReFrame campaign. She is also a member of the Producers Guild of America and the Academy of Television Arts & Sciences.

Fleming is a founding partner with Mark Ordesky of Court Five, a multifaceted media company focused on developing and converting diverse intellectual property and brands into filmed entertainment for distribution worldwide.

== Filmography ==
=== Film ===
- Tiger Eyes (2012): Executive Producer
- Lovely Molly (2012): Producer
- The Frozen Ground (2013): Producer
- Exists (2014): Producer
- Reality High (2017): Producer

=== Television ===
- The Quest (2022): Executive Producer
- The Quest (2014): Executive Producer
