= Altered (2006 film) =

- DVD Cover
- Directed by: Eduardo Sánchez
- Screenplay by: Jamie Nash
- Story by: Eduardo Sánchez; Jamie Nash
- Produced by: Robin Cowie; Gregg Hale
- Starring: Paul McCarthy-Boyington; Brad William Henke; Adam Kaufman; Michael C. Williams; Catherine Mangan; James Gammon
- Cinematography: Steve Yedlin
- Edited by: Michael Cronin
- Music by: Tony Cora; Exiquio Talavera
- Production company: Haxan Films
- Distributed by: Rogue Pictures
- Release date: December 19, 2006 (U.S.)
- Running time: 88 minutes
- Country: United States
- Language: English

Altered is a 2006 American science fiction horror film directed by Eduardo Sánchez and written by Jamie Nash. It was Sánchez's first solo effort as director, following his co-directing of The Blair Witch Project in 1999.

The plot is an inversion of the standard alien abduction formula, as four men abduct an alien, planning to take revenge on the invading species. In its early stages, the film was titled Probed, and was intended as a comic homage to the work of Sam Raimi and Troma Entertainment.

== Plot ==
Altered is the story of four men who seek revenge on aliens, who abducted them and murdered one of their friends many years ago. As is explained via dialogue throughout the film, fifteen years before the events shown in the film, a group of five friends living in a remote American town were captured and experimented on by aliens while on a hunting trip. Only four of the friends returned alive.

The main character (Wyatt) has since distanced himself from his childhood friends and is shown to have decided to live with the past, albeit in apparent constant paranoia. Two of the remaining three characters, however, have been obsessed by revenge and have persuaded the remaining character that this is the correct course of action to take. The story opens with the tracking and subsequent capture of a lone alien—the consequences of which Wyatt and the three friends soon become deeply involved in.

== Cast ==
- Paul McCarthy-Boyington as Cody
- Brad William Henke as Duke
- Michael C. Williams as Otis
- Adam Kaufman as Wyatt
- Catherine Mangan as Hope
- James Gammon as Sheriff Tom Herderson
- Joe Unger as Mr. Towne

== Reception ==
Critical reception for Altered was mixed; Cinema Crazed gave the film a positive review, praising the "good old fashioned special effects mixed with wicked gore", while Reel Film was more ambivalent, suggesting that the film was "a little too talky for its own good, [but] practically a horror masterpiece when compared to some of its straight-to-video brethren." Roger Moore at the Orlando Sentinel was underwhelmed, reflecting that "too many of the arguments are whispered, too many settings are missing the horrific atmosphere the movie requires," and to Scott Weinberg at DVD Talk the film was "kind of a mixed bag: half chintzy and raw, half interesting and semi-creepy."
