= Castello di Amorosa =

Winery located near Calistoga, California

- Location: Calistoga, California, USA
- Coordinates: 38°33′30″N 122°32′34″W
- Appellation: Napa Valley
- Founded: 2007
- First vintage: 2001
- Key people: Dario Sattui
- Cases/yr: 16,000
- Known for: Il Barone Reserve Cabernet Sauvignon
- Varietals: Cabernet Sauvignon, Sangiovese, Pinot Noir, Chardonnay, Gewürztraminer, Pinot grigio, Pinot bianco, Muscato, Gioia- Rosato di Sangiovese, Merlot, Barbera, La Fantasia
- Distribution: On location, wine club, mail order
- Tasting: Open to the public
- Website: castellodiamorosa.com

Castello di Amorosa is a winery located near Calistoga, California. The winery opened to the public in April 2007, as the project of a fourth-generation vintner, Dario Sattui, who also owns and operates the V. Sattui Winery named after his great-grandfather, Vittorio Sattui, who originally established a winery in San Francisco in 1885 after emigrating from Italy to California.

The winery property was once part of an estate owned by Edward Turner Bale. In 1993, Sattui purchased 171 acres (69 ha) for $3.2 million, then spent another $40 million to construct the castle, outbuildings, and the winery inside the castle; construction work began in 1995.

During the Glass Fire that began on September 27, 2020, the farmhouse suffered major damage, the entire 2020 vintage of the wine Fantasia was lost, but the castle was left unharmed.

== Inspiration ==
After graduating with an MBA from the University of California, Berkeley in 1969, Dario Sattui spent two years traveling in Europe, during which time he developed an interest in medieval architecture. He took photos and made sketches of various buildings he would visit including medieval castles, monasteries, palaces, farmhouses and wineries.

== Castle ==
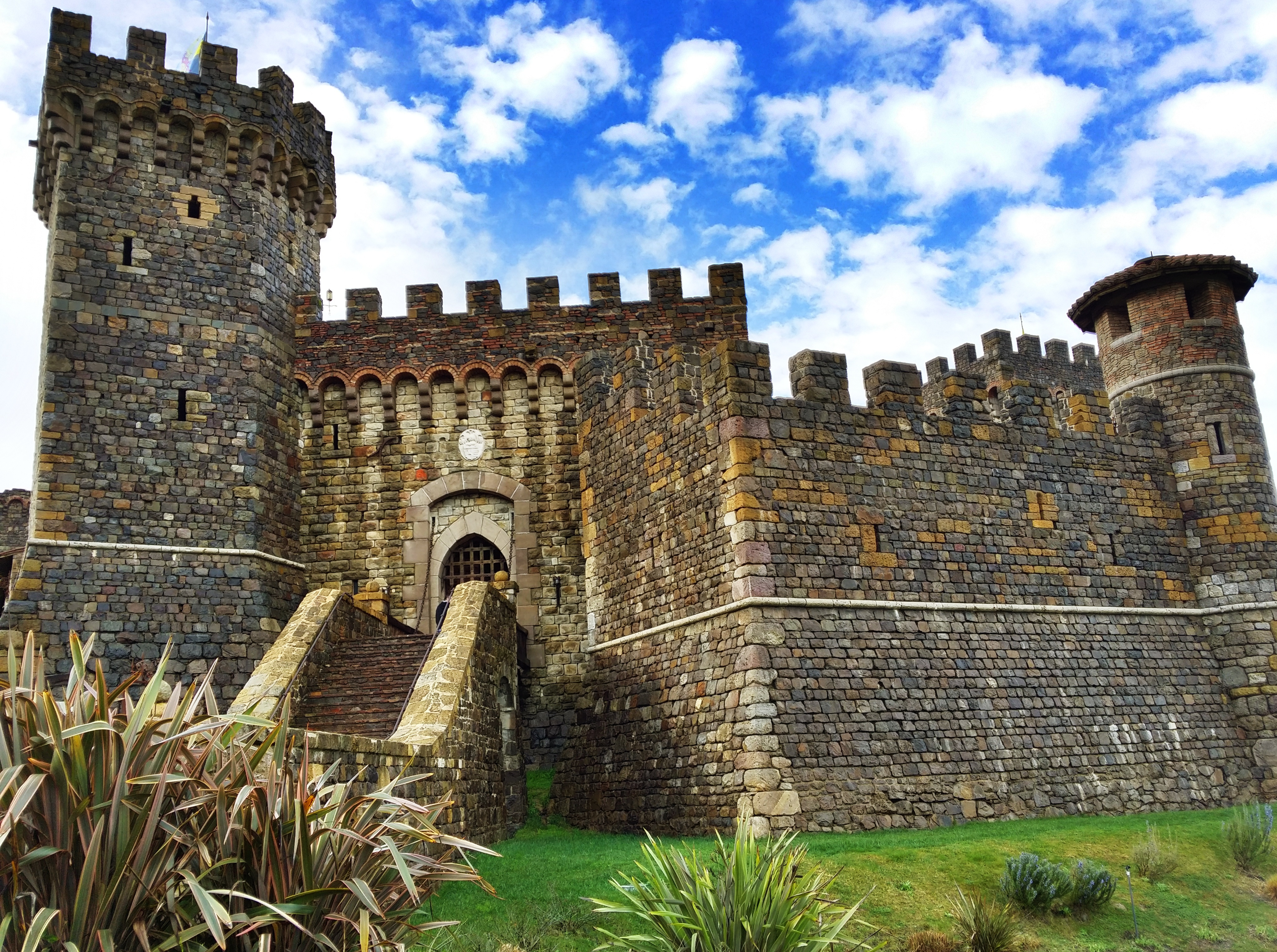
Main entrance

The castle interiors, which include 107 rooms on 8 levels above and below ground, were approximately 121,000 square feet (11,200 m^{2}) when opened in 2007; it has since been expanded to 141,000 square feet (13,100 m^{2}).

Key details and building techniques are architecturally faithful to the 12th and 13th century time period. Among many other features, it includes a moat; a drawbridge, defensive towers, an interior courtyard, a torture chamber, a chapel/church, a knights' chamber, and a 72–30 feet (21.9–9.1 m) great hall with a 22-foot (6.7 m)-high coffered ceiling.

The torture chamber has an iron maiden said to be from the late Renaissance, which Sattui states he bought for $13,000 in Pienza, Italy; a replica rack; and other torture devices. The great hall features frescoes painted by two Italian artists, who took about a year and a half to complete, and showcases a 500-year-old fireplace.

The masonry, ironwork, and woodwork were fashioned by hand using old world crafting techniques. Building materials included 8,000 tons of locally quarried stone, paving stones, terra cotta roofing tiles, and 850,000 bricks imported from Europe. Extending into the hillside adjacent to the castle is a labyrinth of caves some 900 feet (270 m) in length. Beneath the castle are a 2-acre (8,100 m^{2}) barrel cellar and tasting rooms where visitors can sample the wines, all sold only at the Castle or through the winery's wine club.

Due to Napa County restrictions, the castle and grounds cannot be rented for weddings or receptions, but are available to rent for corporate gatherings and fund raisers. In May 2012 the county ordered the winery to cease holding a weekly Catholic Mass in the chapel located on the grounds due to lack of use permits.

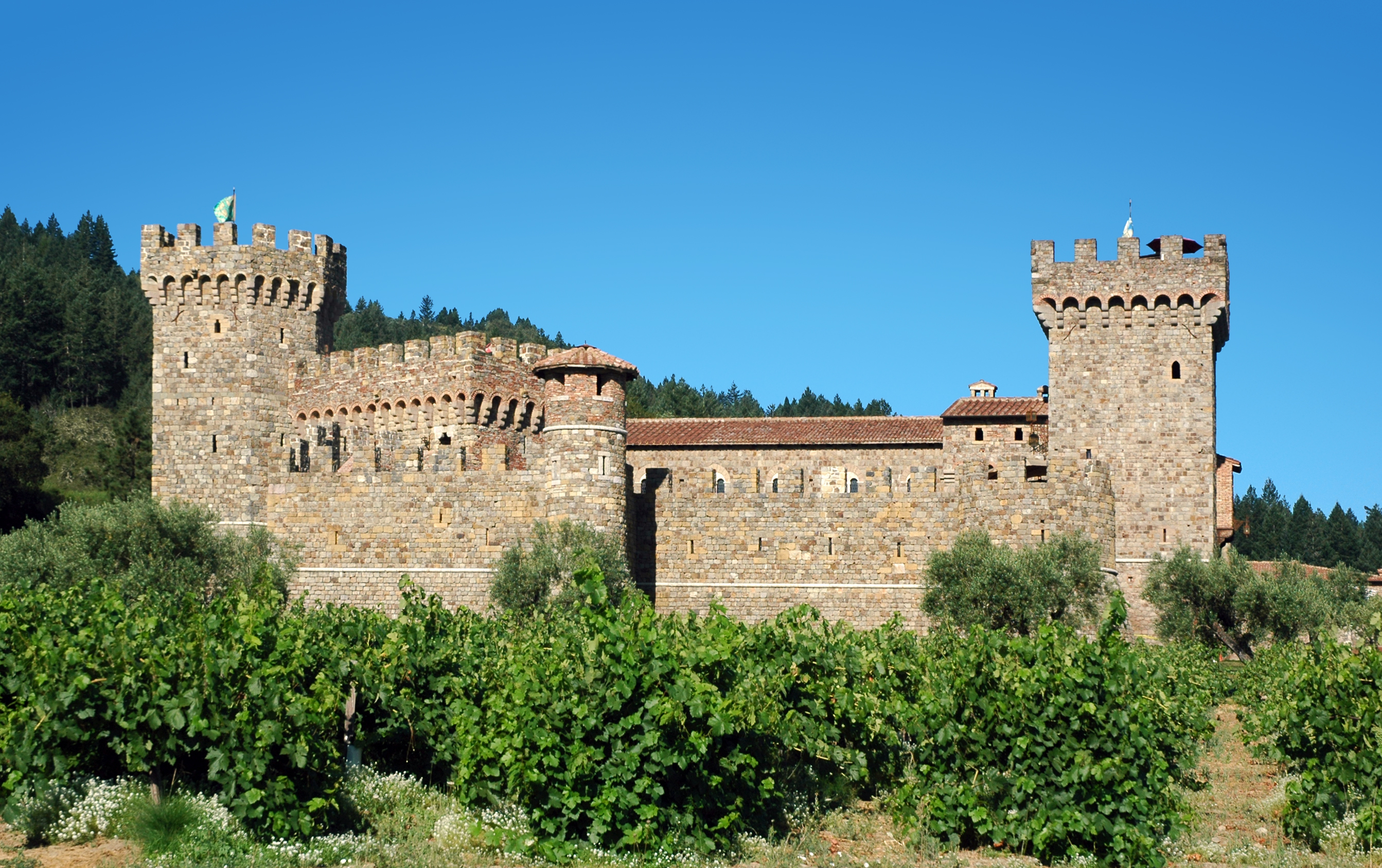
The castle as seen from the driveway

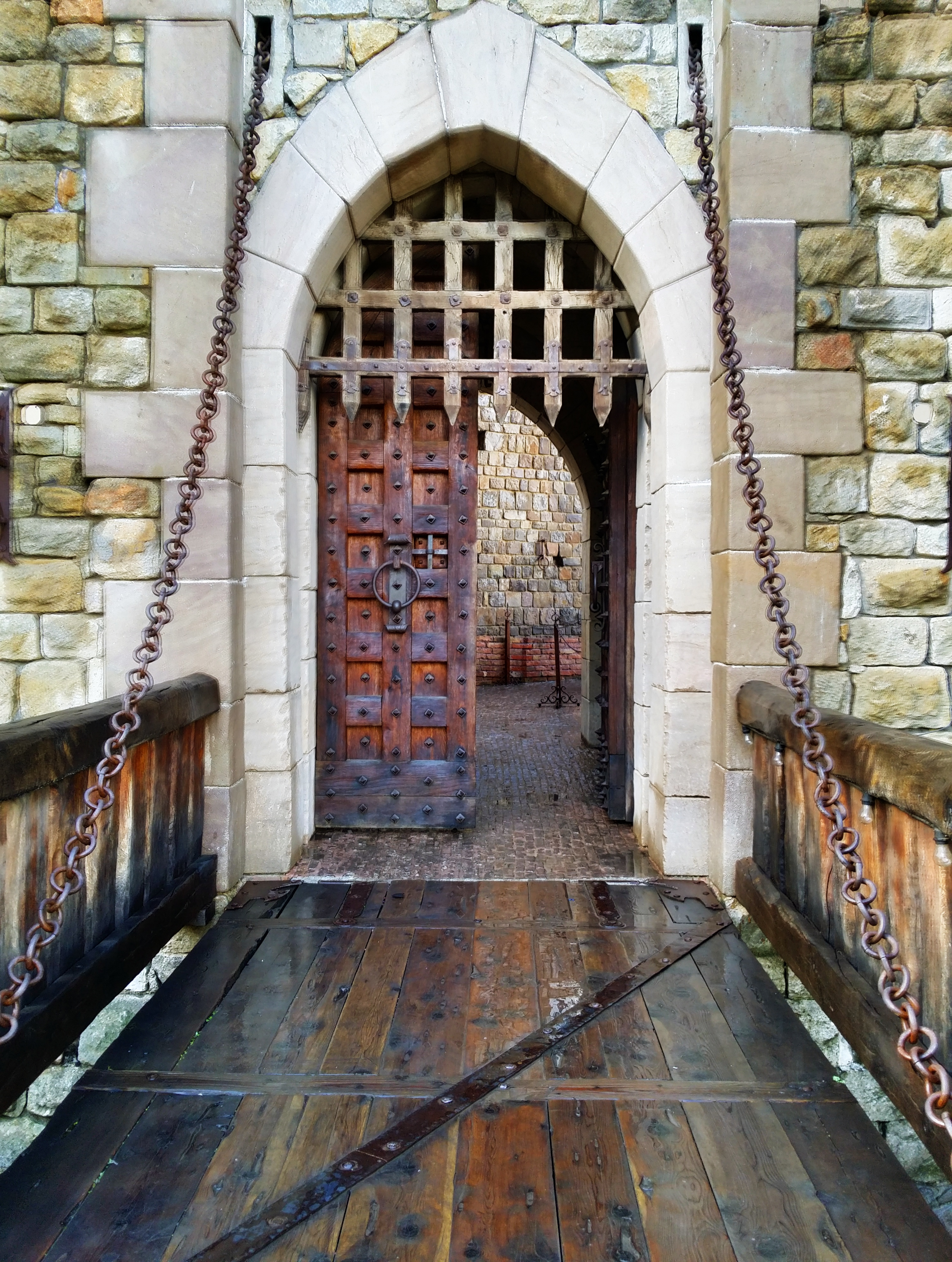
The drawbridge entrance

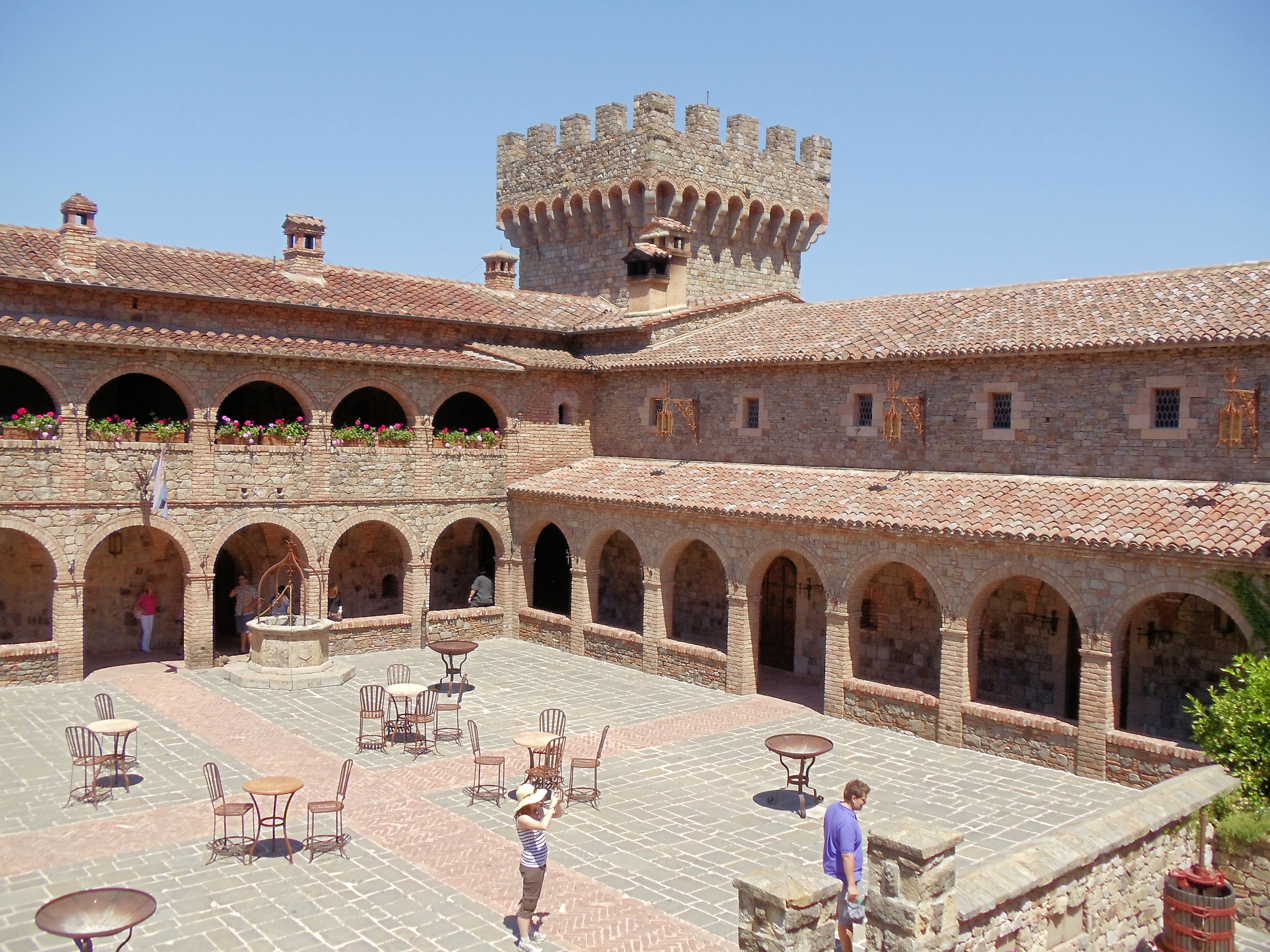
Courtyard

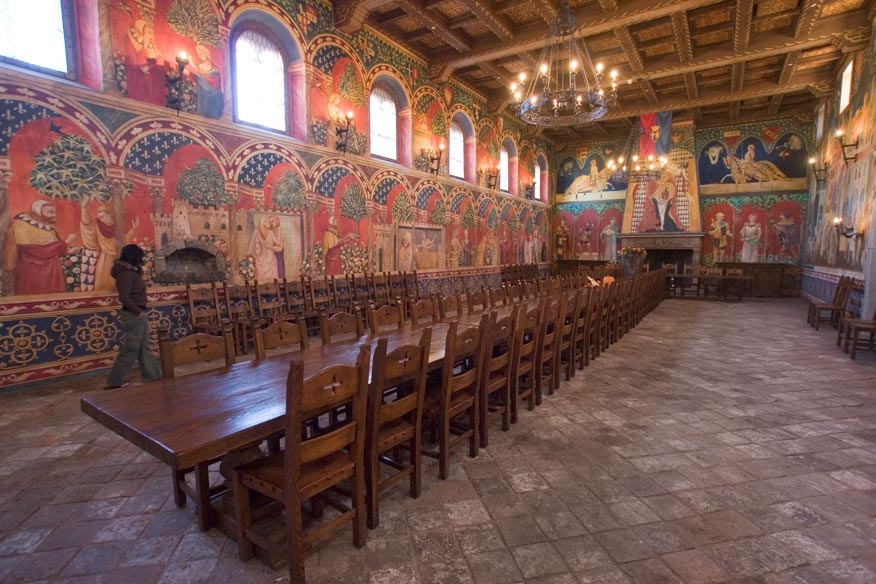
The great hall

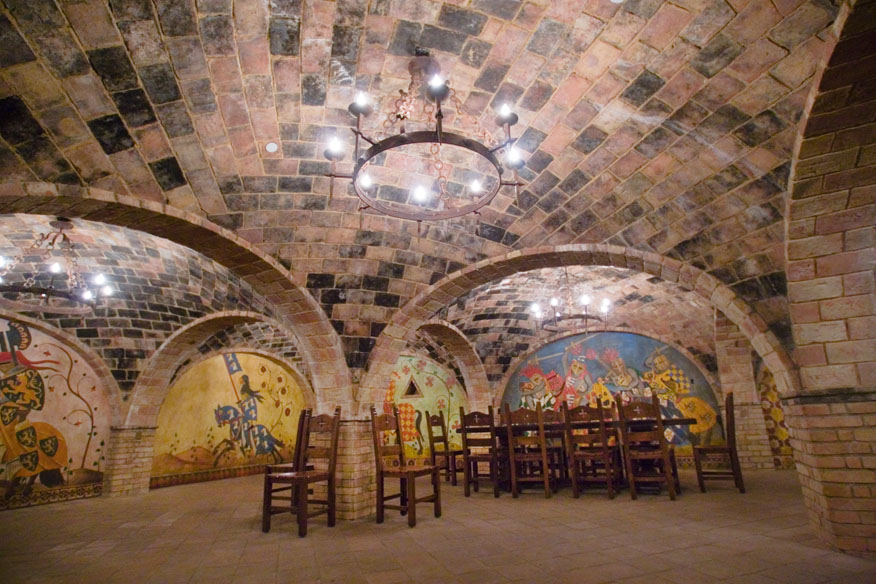
Knights' chambers

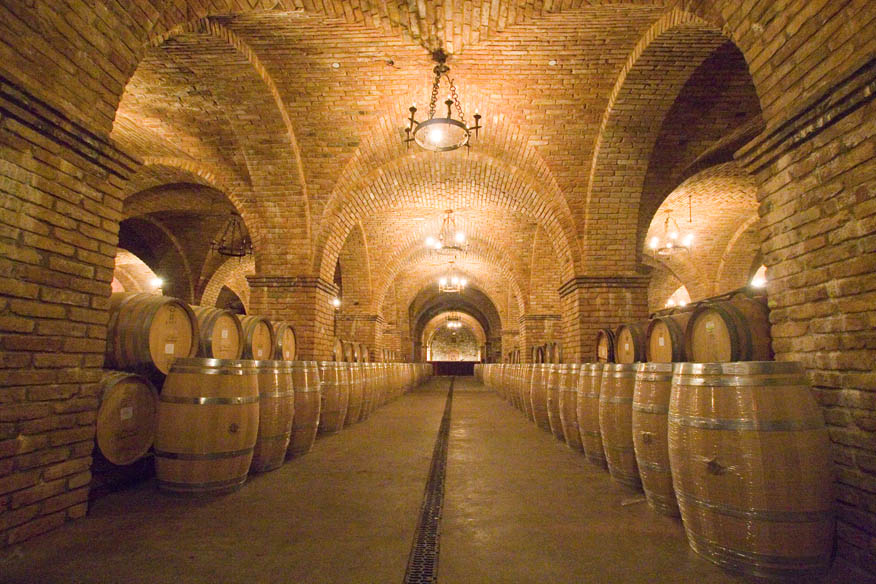
The wine cellar

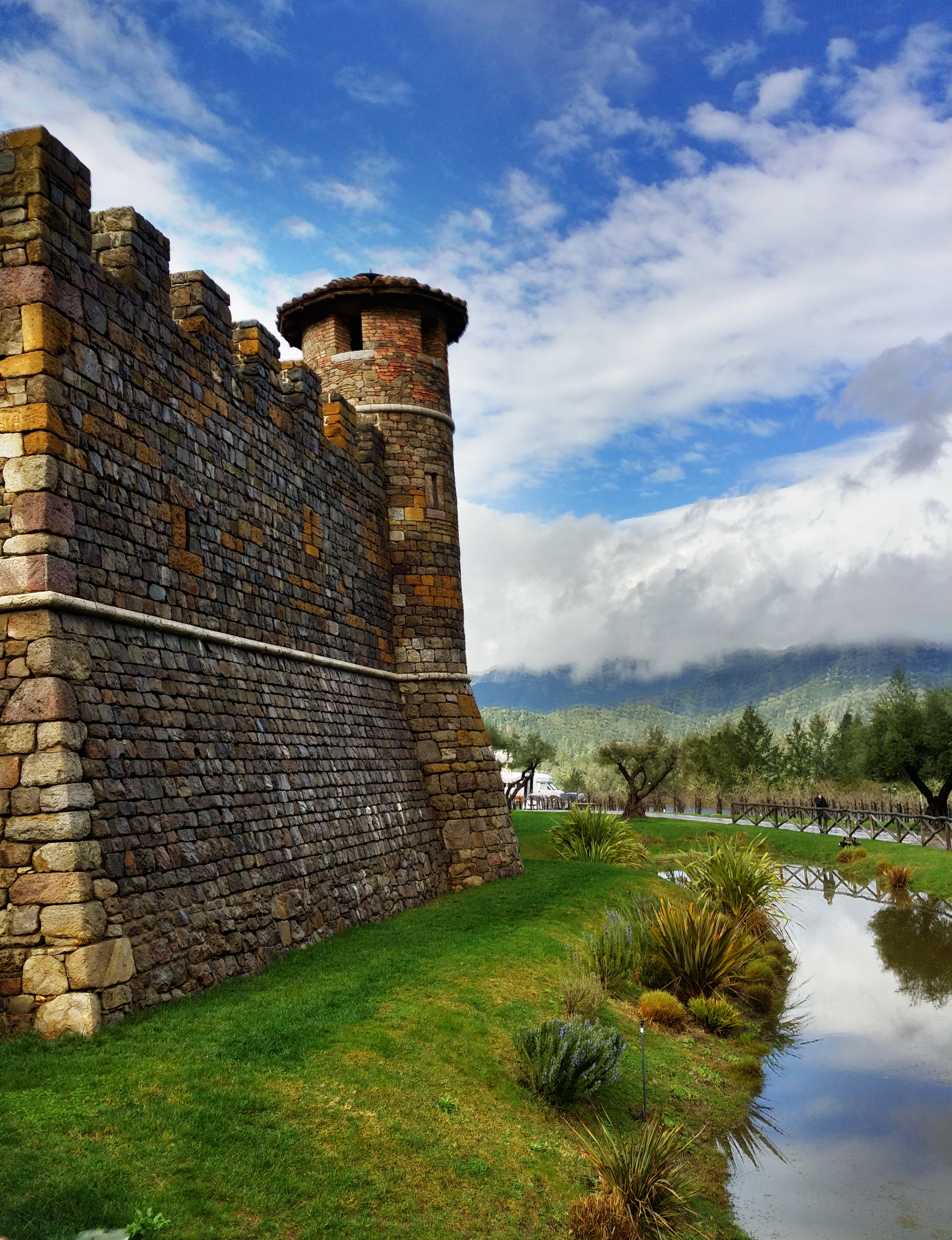
Exterior walls

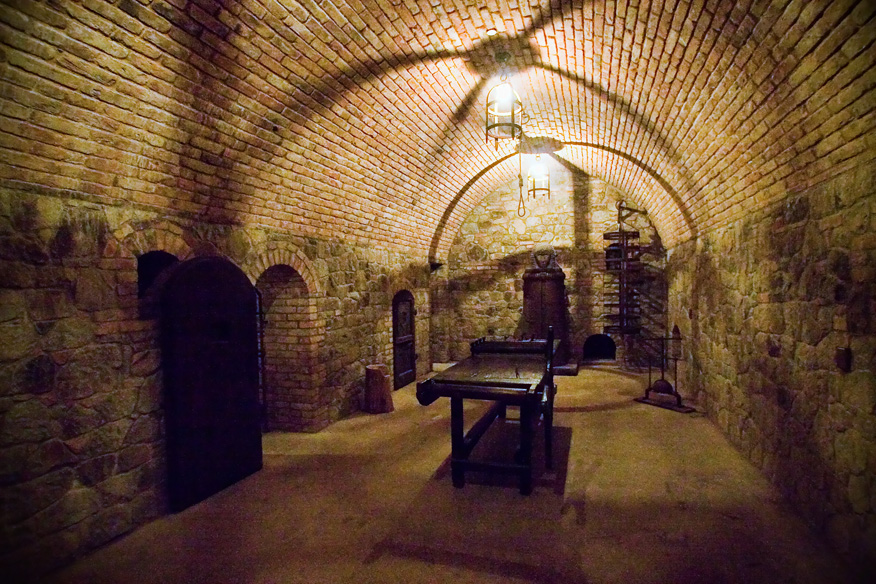
Torture chamber
