= Gregg Hale (filmmaker) =

American film producer

Gregg Hale is an American film producer, best known for producing The Blair Witch Project and starring in the documentary film of Blair Witch, The Woods Movie. He directed the segment "A Ride in the Park" in V/H/S/2.

== Early life ==
Hale was born in Selma, Alabama but considers Henderson, Kentucky his hometown. He went to Western Kentucky University for a year, before dropping out to serve for four years in the U.S. Army.

== Career ==
After leaving military service, he moved to Orlando, Florida where he went to film school at Valencia College and the University of Central Florida (class of 1995). He then worked as a set dresser and prop man on features and TV shows in Orlando and Los Angeles for ten years, before producing The Blair Witch Project.

Along with David S. Goyer (under the pseudonym Ricardo Festiva), Hale also created FreakyLinks, a science fiction series that combined elements of horror, mystery, and comedy. It aired on Fox from October 6, 2000 until June 22, 2001, for a total run of 13 episodes.

In 2002, he served as an executive producer on a revival of the In Search Of television series that investigated mysterious phenomena, airing on The Sci-Fi Channel and hosted by Mitch Pileggi. He then worked as a set dresser and prop man on features and TV shows in Orlando and Los Angeles for ten years, before producing The Blair Witch Project.

In 2024, his first novel, Emerald Anvil: Journey to Hada, was published. It was co-created with Eduardo Sánchez, one of the directors of The Blair Witch Project, and co-written with Sanchez' oldest offspring, Bianca (age 23, they/them). In an interview about creating the novel, Hale said:

"Inspired by my experience as a DnD Dungeon Master, I constructed the first draft of the novel as a literary role-playing game... then Bianca and I got on an online document and progressed through the plot in much the same way as a player would move through an RPG."

== Personal life ==
Hale currently lives in Portland, Oregon with his wife, Adrian, and two children.
