= Eduardo Sánchez (director) =

Cuban-born American film director

- Born: Eduardo Miguel Sánchez-Quiros; December 20, 1968 (age 57); Havana, Cuba
- Occupations: Director; producer; screenwriter; editor
- Spouse: Stefanie De Cassan

Eduardo Miguel Sánchez-Quirós (born December 20, 1968) is a Cuban-born American director, known for his work in the horror genre. His most famous credit is for co-directing and writing the 1999 psychological horror film The Blair Witch Project with Daniel Myrick.

== Early life and education ==
Born in 1968, Sánchez moved to Spain with his family at the age of two, before settling in the United States in 1972. His family located to Montgomery County, Maryland, where he attended Wheaton High School. He later studied television production at Montgomery College in Maryland and obtained his B.A. degree from the University of Central Florida Film Department where he studied with Mary C. Johnson and Charles Harpole. In 1999, Sánchez was joint-recipient of the inaugural Independent Spirit John Cassavetes Award.

== Filmography ==
Feature films

Year	Title	Credited as			
Year	Title	Director	Writer	Editor	Notes
1999	The Blair Witch Project	Yes	Yes	Yes	Co-directed with Daniel Myrick
2006	Altered	Yes	Story	No	
2008	Seventh Moon	Yes	Yes	No	
2011	Lovely Molly	Yes	Yes	Yes	
2014	Exists	Yes	Story	Yes	Co-edited with Andrew Eckblad and Andy Jenkins

Short films

- Curse of the Blair Witch (1999)
- Sticks and Stones: Investigating the Blair Witch (1999)
- A Ride in the Park (2013) (segment from V/H/S/2)
- The Vampire (2022) (segment from Satanic Hispanics)

Web series

- ParaAbnormal (2009)
- Four Corners of Fear (2013)

Television episodes

- Supernatural (2005–2020) (5 episodes)
- Intruders (2014) (4 episodes)
- From Dusk till Dawn: The Series (2014–2016) (4 episodes)
- 12 Deadly Days (2016) (1 episode)
- Lucifer (2016–2021) (2 episodes)
- Queen of the South (2016–2021) (8 episodes)
- Taken (2017–18) (2 episodes)
- The Passage (2019) (episode "You Are like the Sun")
- The InBetween (2019) (episode "The Devil's Refugee")
- Next (2020) (episode "File #4")
- Nancy Drew (2021) (episode "The Reunion of The Lost Souls")
- American Horror Stories (2021) (episode "Drive In")
- Yellowjackets (2022) (episode "Sic Transit Gloria Mundi")
- Charmed (2022) (episode "Truth or Dares")
- CSI: Vegas (2023) (episode "Third Time's the Charm")
- FBI (2023) (episode "Family First")
- FBI: International (2023) (episode "Jealous Mistress")
- Star Trek: Strange New Worlds (2023) (episode "Among the Lotus Eaters")
- Hysteria (2024) (episode "Speaking in Tongues")
- Goosebumps (2025) (episode "The Girl Next Door")
- Will Trent (2026) (episode "Nice to Meet You, Malcolm")

Actor

- Unknown Dimension: The Story of Paranormal Activity (2021) (Documentary film, himself)
