= 7:15 A.M. =

- Once Upon a Time episode
- Episode no.: Season 1 Episode 10
- Directed by: Ralph Hemecker
- Story by: Edward Kitsis; Adam Horowitz
- Teleplay by: Daniel T. Thomsen
- Original air date: January 22, 2012

Guest appearances
- Lee Arenberg as Grumpy; Eion Bailey as The Stranger; Alan Dale as King George; Anastasia Griffith as Kathryn Nolan; Kwesi Ameyaw as Dr. Thatcher; Geoff Gustafson as Stealthy; Meghan Ory as Red Riding Hood/Ruby

Episode chronology
← Previous "True North"	Next → "Fruit of the Poisonous Tree"
- Once Upon a Time season 1

"7:15 A.M." is the tenth episode of the American fairy tale/drama television series Once Upon a Time. The series takes place in the fictional seaside town of Storybrooke, Maine, in which the residents are actually characters from various fairy tales that were transported to the "real world" town by a powerful curse. In this episode, Emma Swan (Jennifer Morrison) and Regina Mills (Lana Parrilla) become suspicious of the Stranger (Eion Bailey) and his visit to Storybrooke, while David (Josh Dallas) and Mary Margaret's (Ginnifer Goodwin) feelings for each other grow, which parallels with Prince James' (Dallas) search for Snow (Goodwin) after he falls for her.

The episode's teleplay was written by executive story editor Daniel T. Thomsen, while co-creators Edward Kitsis and Adam Horowitz wrote the story. Ralph Hemecker directed the installment. "7:15 A.M." was filmed in November 2011 in Vancouver and surrounding areas of British Columbia, where the crew endured difficult weather conditions. It featured the first full introductions of the Stranger and Red Riding Hood (Meghan Ory).

"7:15 A.M." first aired in the United States on ABC on January 22, 2012, to an estimated 9.33 million viewers, placing second in its timeslot. Critical reception to the episode ranged from mixed to positive; most critics positively focused on Snow and Charming's storyline and praised Dallas and Goodwin for their performances and excellent chemistry. The episode was included in Reawakened: A Once Upon a Time Tale – a novelization of the first season – which was published by Hyperion Books in 2013.

== Title card ==
The cloaked figure of Snow White walks through the Enchanted Forest.

== Plot ==
=== In the characters' past ===
In the Enchanted Forest, Red Riding Hood (Meghan Ory) brings supplies and news to her friend, Snow White (Ginnifer Goodwin). Prince Charming (Josh Dallas) is set to marry Abigail (Anastasia Griffith) in two days. Snow White wishes there were a way to get Charming out of her head as she is still in love with him. Red suggests she see Rumplestiltskin (Robert Carlyle) and Snow takes her advice. Rumplestiltskin takes some water and a piece of Snow's hair to make a potion that will make her forget Charming. He warns that love is a powerful disease and the cure must be extreme.

At the palace, Charming struggles with his feelings for Snow. King George (Alan Dale) commands him to forget her because the marriage to Abigail is worth great wealth to the kingdom. Charming sends a letter by carrier pigeon to Snow begging her to come and see him so they can be together. The letter reaches her just before she can take the potion. Snow makes it to the palace but she is seized by the guards and thrown into the dungeon. There she meets a dwarf named Grumpy (Lee Arenberg), who was falsely imprisoned for stealing a diamond that he wanted to give to his girlfriend. Another dwarf, Stealthy (Geoff Gustafson), shows up to rescue Grumpy, who asks Stealthy to free Snow as well. The guards kill Stealthy as they try to escape and try to recapture Grumpy. Snow threatens to burn down the palace unless they let Grumpy go and take her in his place. King George tells Snow he will not let her interfere with the wedding. She must tell Charming she does not love him, or the King will kill him. Snow obeys because she loves Charming too much to let him die, but both are left heartbroken. Snow leaves and is soon joined by Grumpy and six other dwarfs, who offer her a place to stay. She considers the potion but Grumpy warns her that those feelings however painful, are part of her. The next morning, Charming calls off the wedding to look for Snow and the dwarves hear about it from Red Riding Hood. Grumpy joyfully tells Snow the good news, but she has forgotten about Charming. The pain was too great to bear and she drank the potion.

=== In Storybrooke ===
In Storybrooke, Henry (Jared S. Gilmore) leaves for school and notices the Stranger (Eion Bailey) fixing his motorcycle. Henry asks him about why he was in town, but the Stranger only mentions that a storm is brewing. Regina (Lana Parrilla) notices the interaction so she asks Emma Swan (Jennifer Morrison) to find out about the Stranger. Emma catches up with him at Granny's and asks him what he is doing in town, and what's in his box. He agrees to tell, on the condition he can buy Emma a drink sometime. She agrees so the Stranger reveals a typewriter. He is a writer in town for inspiration. Emma inquires about the drink, and he reminds her she agreed to "sometime."

The same day, Mary Margaret (Goodwin) rushes out the door and gives Emma an excuse that she has to make a volcano. In truth she has been going to Granny's at 7:15 every morning to see David (Dallas) getting coffee for himself and Kathryn (Griffith). Emma, who can always spot a lie, follows Mary Margaret to call out her stalking behavior and suggests she stop seeing him. Mary Margaret buys some chocolate to drown her woes and runs right into Kathryn, who is picking up a pregnancy test. Regina notices this, and warns Mary Margaret to stay away from David, and it was their personal life.

Later on in the day, Mary Margaret finds a dove in the forest trapped in some wire mesh. The town vet (Kwesi Ameyew) at the shelter where David works tells her the bird will be okay but only if she returns to her flock. David offers to help Mary Margaret return the dove but she declines. He follows her anyway and is able to save her from falling off a cliff. It starts to pour so the two take shelter in an empty cabin. David asks Mary Margaret what is wrong and she admits she still has feelings for him, and he is the reason she goes to Granny's at 7:15. David replies that he goes to Granny's to see her. They nearly kiss but Mary Margaret stops it because she knows about Kathryn's pregnancy test. David explains that his feelings for Kathryn are memories but his feelings for Mary Margaret are real. She says they have to forget each other. The next day Mary Margaret and David try to avoid seeing each other by going to Granny's at 7:45. Ultimately, they realize they cannot stay apart, and they kiss. Regina watches them from a distance.

== Production ==
The episode's teleplay was written by executive story editor Daniel T. Thomsen, while co-creators Adam Horowitz and Edward Kitsis co-wrote the story. Renegade veteran Ralph Hemecker, directed the installment in November 2011. As with the rest of the first season, all exterior shots of the town of Storybrooke were filmed in the small town of Steveston, British Columbia. Interior shots were mainly shot on sound stages in their Vancouver studio, often with green screens. Goodwin stated in the episode's DVD audio commentary that she preferred practical sets to green screens, as she found the former easier to act with. She also mentioned her hatred of her character's short hair throughout the episode, variously describing it as boyish, a mullet, and a Jewfro.

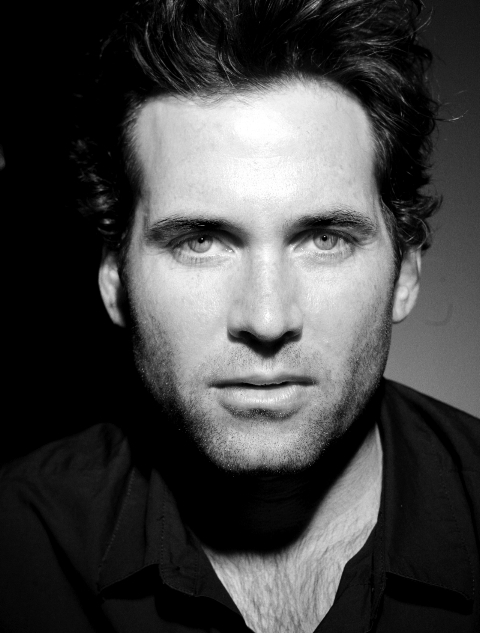
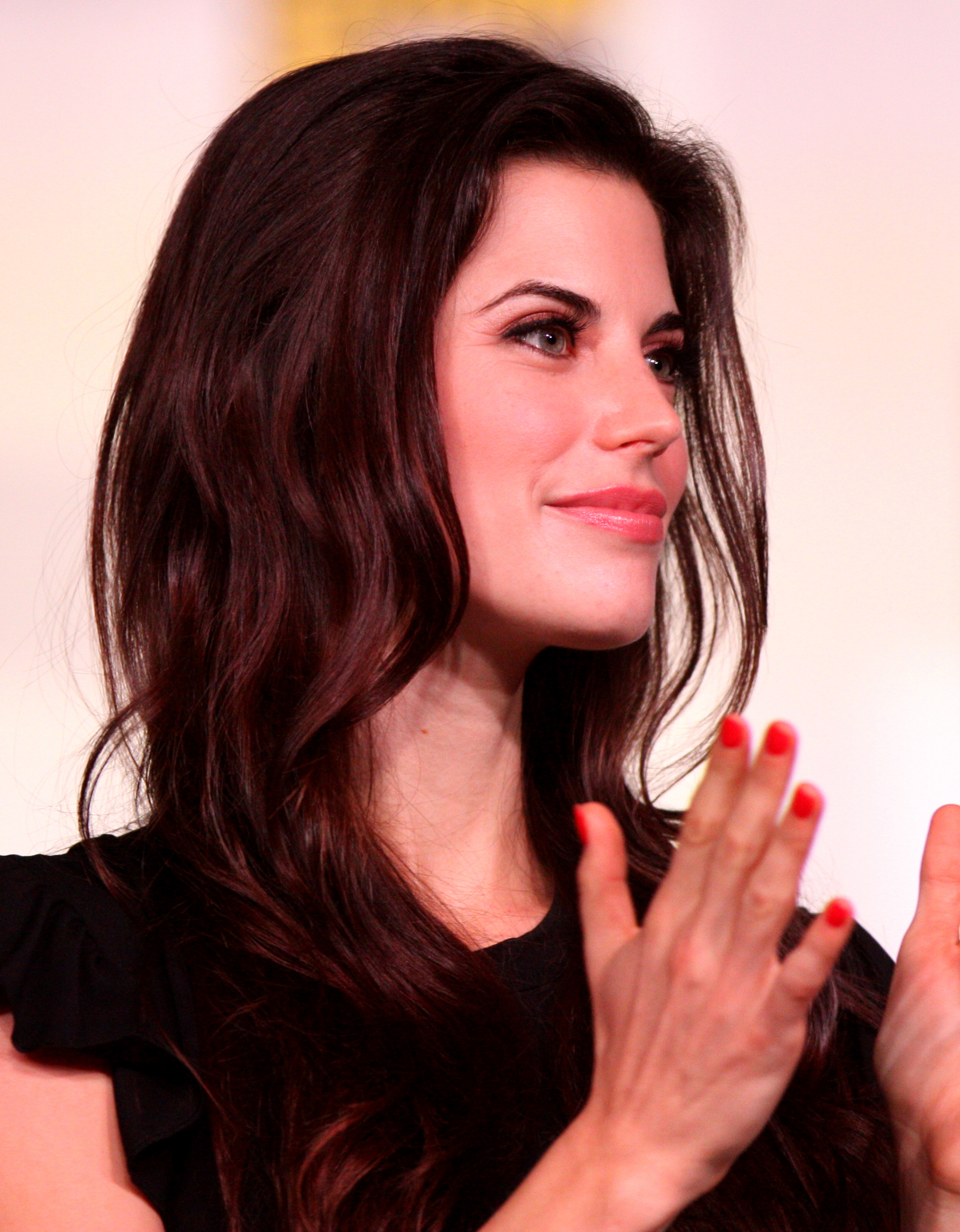
"7:15 A.M." featured the first full appearances of Eion Bailey and Meghan Ory

According to Dallas, it rained on days that were supposed to be sunny, while other days of production lacked rain when they were supposed to be rainy. Goodwin added that the scene of Snow and Charming releasing the birds was freezing because of the heavy rain. Their scene in the cabin took place on the first day of the episode's production. Her near-death scene involved a real cliff, though the height was exaggerated later using CGI and a green screen; a stunt double stood in for some of the shots.

"7:15 A.M." featured the first full introduction of Red Riding Hood (Meghan Ory) – though she appears briefly in four earlier episodes – as well as the first full appearance of the Stranger (Eion Bailey). Bailey's multi-episode casting was first announced in October 2011, and he appeared briefly during the conclusion of the previous episode. The episode was included in Reawakened: A Once Upon a Time Tale – a novelization of the first season – which was published by Hyperion Books in 2013.

== Cultural references ==
Producer Damon Lindelof had an uncredited voice cameo as the Storybrooke weatherman. Apollo bars from Lindelof's series Lost were also featured in the episode. Mary Margaret is seen reading The Mysterious Island by Jules Verne, which is a book also featured in TRON: Legacy, a film written by Horowitz and Kitsis.

== Reception ==
=== Ratings ===
"7:15 A.M." first aired on January 22, 2012, in the United States. An estimated 9.30 million viewers watched the episode, placing second in its timeslot behind a NFC Championship Game between the New York Giants and the San Francisco 49ers. The episode earned a ratings share of 3.2/7 among adults aged 18 to 49 and a 5.4/8 score overall. The episode's ratings and viewership made the series the number one non-sports program among viewers and young adults on Sunday nights.

=== Reviews ===
The episode received mixed to positive reviews from television critics.

Writing for IGN, Amy Ratcliffe gave "7:15 A.M." a score of 7 out of 10, an indication of a "good" episode. She felt that Goodwin and Dallas had good chemistry, making the audience root for them despite David's married status. Entertainment Weekly writer Hilary Busis praised Goodwin's performance, especially when her character tells Charming she no longer loves him. Tor.com's Teresa Jusino lauded the episode for containing a "beautifully-written script that focuses on two of the most intriguing and endearing characters on the show," effectively indicating to viewers "exactly why Mary Margaret and David (and Snow and James) are in love." Jusino concluded that the episode provided "a great respite from the previous week's lull, and provided not only a story that pulled viewers in, but one that provided some wonderful character detail."

"Every moment we spend with Snow and James -- or Mary Margaret and David -- raises the show to a whole new level; the longing between them is so palpable, and played so perfectly by Ginnifer Goodwin and Josh Dallas, that my heart aches for them every time they're on screen. What this pair can convey with a single, lingering look could put other actors to shame."

— The Huffington Post writer Laura Prudom

The Huffington Post's Laura Prudom applauded the differences between the characters in Storybrooke and their fairytale counterparts; she felt that this narrative device would help prevent viewers from getting frustrated if Snow and Charming grew further apart in one land but closer in the other. Prudom also enjoyed the writers' decision to make David "indecisive and, as a result, also somewhat selfish," while James is ready to leave his fiancé for Snow. Prudom concluded that the episode "expertly combined all the elements that make Once Upon a Time one of the most addictive and heartfelt new shows of the season, blending emotion, mystery and narrative thrust while giving us a deeper understanding of our favorite characters. I hope the next batch of episodes can keep up the momentum established this week."

The Wall Street Journal's Gwen Orel wrote that "maybe it's the curse wearing off, but the use of parallel worlds and stories is better and better, sometimes even gesture to gesture. It's about Snow and thwarted love this week, and that's always compelling." Oliver Sava of The A.V. Club was more critical of the episode and gave it a C+. He felt that it was "the strongest episode of the series since Rumpelstiltskin's first" flashback in "Desperate Souls" because it did a better job handling the fairytale storyline. However, Sava faulted it for containing predictable elements, having many of the characters acting stupidly, and for being "painfully obvious while trying to be clever, aiming for poignancy but getting laughs instead." Sava praised Griffiths' performance for "min[ing] her wooden dialogue for some real emotional weight."

== Cast ==
=== Starring ===
- Ginnifer Goodwin as Snow White/Mary Margaret Blanchard
- Jennifer Morrison as Emma Swan
- Lana Parrilla as Regina Mills
- Josh Dallas as Prince Charming/David Nolan
- Jared S. Gilmore as Henry Mills
- Raphael Sbarge (credit only)
- Robert Carlyle as Rumplestiltskin

=== Guest Starring ===
- Lee Arenberg as Grumpy
- Eion Bailey as Stranger
- Alan Dale as King George
- Anastasia Griffith as Kathryn Nolan
- Kwesi Ameyaw as Dr. Thatcher
- Geoff Gustafson as Stealthy
- Meghan Ory as Red Riding Hood/Ruby

=== Co-Starring ===
- Michasha Armstrong as Guard
- Michael Coleman as Happy
- Faustino di Bauda as Sleepy
- David-Paul Grove as Doc
- Jonathan Holmes as Majordomo
- Jeffrey Kaiser as Dopey
- Gabe Khouth as Sneezy/Mr. Clark
- Mig Macario as Bashful

=== Uncredited ===
- Damon Lindelof as Bill Gozen (voice)
- Unknown as Floyd
