= True North (Once Upon a Time) =

- Once Upon a Time episode
- Hansel and Gretel inside the Blind Witch's gingerbread house. The series' production designer and set decorator drew inspiration from an "inside-out cake".
- Episode no.: Season 1 Episode 9
- Directed by: Dean White
- Written by: David H. Goodman; Liz Tigelaar
- Original air date: January 15, 2012

Guest appearances
- Lee Arenberg as Grumpy; Eion Bailey as The Stranger; Emma Caulfield as The Blind Witch; Karley Scott Collins as Gretel/Ava; Nicholas Lea as The Woodcutter/Michael Tillman; Quinn Lord as Hansel/Nicholas

Episode chronology
← Previous "Desperate Souls"	Next → "7:15 A.M."
- Once Upon a Time season 1

"True North" is the ninth episode of the first season of the American fairy tale drama television series Once Upon a Time. The series takes place in the fictional seaside town of Storybrooke, Maine, in which the residents are actually characters from various fairy tales that were transported to the "real world" town by a powerful curse. In the episode, Sheriff Emma Swan (Jennifer Morrison) helps two children (Karley Scott Collins and Quinn Lord) track down their father before they are placed in a foster care system, in a parallel with the story of Hansel and Gretel. Along the way, they encounter the Evil Queen (Lana Parrilla), and the Blind Witch (Emma Caulfield).

"True North" was co-written by Liz Tigelaar and David H. Goodman, while being directed by Dean White. Co-creators Edward Kitsis and Adam Horowitz chose the story of Hansel and Gretel to help reveal Emma's difficult backstory, as the character lacked a fairytale counterpart. They cast Caulfield because they were fans of her work on the television series Buffy the Vampire Slayer. The Blind Witch's gingerbread house had a computer-generated exterior, while its interior set was based on concept art designed by production designer Michael Joy.

The episode first aired in the United States on ABC on January 15, 2012. An estimated 9.84 million viewers watched the episode on its original broadcast. It earned a Nielsen ratings share of 3.3/8 among adults, meaning that it was seen by 3.3 percent of all 18- to 49-year-olds, and 8 percent of all 18- to 49-year-olds watching television at the time of broadcast. This was a decrease of 11 percent from the previous episode. Critical reception was largely mixed to negative, with critics praising Caulfield's performance but critiquing other elements.

== Title card ==
A gingerbread house stands in the forest.

== Plot ==
=== In Storybrooke ===
In a Storybrooke drugstore, Henry (Jared S. Gilmore) meets a young girl named Ava (Karley Scott Collins). Henry is stopped by the store owner for shoplifting, which reveals Ava and her brother Nicholas (Quinn Lord) were using Henry to smuggle stolen merchandise. Regina (Lana Parrilla) and Sheriff Emma Swan (Jennifer Morrison) arrive to handle the juveniles. Emma discovers the siblings are living without parents and almost no food. In need of help, Emma resolves to find Ava and Nicholas's father (Nicholas Lea) out of a desire to keep them out of the foster system she herself was raised in. Regina calls social services, but the system would have to place the kids in two different homes in Boston. Determined to keep her promise not to separate them, Emma asks them for something that had belonged to their father. Ava provides her with a compass.

Emma asks Mr. Gold (Robert Carlyle) about the compass and he searches his records. He finds a card that supposedly says Michael Tillman purchased the compass, and gives Emma this name. The card is revealed to be blank. Michael is the garage mechanic, and tells Emma he can barely handle the garage let alone twins. Emma has no choice but to take Ava and Nicholas to Boston on Regina's orders, despite Henry's warnings that no one can leave Storybrooke. That evening as the three are leaving, the vehicle breaks down as they reach the city limits, prompting Emma to call for help. Moments later, Ava notices her compass working. Michael arrives in his tow truck, and Emma explains that he at least has to see his children, as she could not leave Henry after seeing the life he had. Seeing Ava and Nicholas face to face changes his mind, and Michael accepts them into his life. Later, Emma shares Henry's theory with Mary Margaret (Ginnifer Goodwin), that she is Snow White's daughter and Mary Margaret is Snow White. Mary finds this laughable, but seeing Emma's blanket triggers some sort of reaction from her. After a minute, however, she is quick to dismiss it as nothing.

In the meantime, Henry asks Emma about his father. Emma tells Henry that his dad was a trainee fireman who used to frequent the diner where she worked. The two of them "hung out" a few times, resulting in Emma being pregnant with Henry before she went to jail. Once there, she tried to tell him about Henry, only to discover that he had died while saving a family from a burning building. However, she later admits to Mary the story she gave Henry was a lie and he should never know the truth about his father. After Emma's reunion of the children with Michael that evening, Henry arrived with pumpkin pie to give Emma in order to thank her for explaining about his birth father. They are interrupted by a stranger (Eion Bailey) on a motorcycle with a unique box. Without giving his name, he asks Emma about finding a place to stay. After referring him to Granny's Bed & Breakfast, she reminds Henry that he said no one else ever comes to or leaves Storybrooke and Henry replies that they don't.

=== In the characters' past ===
In the Enchanted Forest, Hansel (Lord) and Gretel (Collins), are searching for kindling while their father (Lea) chops firewood. He gives Gretel a compass so they won't be separated, but when they return, he is nowhere to be found. As they search they run into The Evil Queen (Parrilla) and are captured. She tells the two that she can help find their father, on the condition that they retrieve an item belonging to her from The Blind Witch (Emma Caulfield). They must enter her gingerbread house when The Blind Witch is asleep and fetch The Evil Queen's leather satchel, but they must not eat a thing. They break in safely, but Hansel gives in to the temptation of taking a bite of a cupcake, causing The Blind Witch to wake up. While she cannot see the children, she can smell their scent. The Blind Witch locks them up and prepares the oven to roast them. The two, working together, are able to push the witch into her own oven as The Evil Queen, who is gleefully watching the events from her mirror, magically sends a bolt of fire through her mirror into the witch's oven, roasting her alive.

When the two return to The Evil Queen's palace, she opens the satchel to reveal a poisoned apple. The Evil Queen offers Hansel and Gretel a home at the palace, but they are adamant about returning to their father. She sends them back into the forest and summons her newest prisoner, Hansel and Gretel's father. The Evil Queen asks why the children turned down the luxurious life of the palace and he answers that they are family, and family finds each other. Frustrated, she sends him away to see if they indeed find each other.

== Production ==
"True North" was co-written by co-executive producers David H. Goodman and Liz Tigelaar, while being directed by The Shield veteran Dean White. In an interview with Comic Book Resources, co-creator Edward Kitsis noted that it was difficult to pick iconic stories such as Cinderella and Hansel and Gretel because "the challenge becomes revealing a piece you never knew before or putting a fun twist on it." According to actress Jennifer Morrison, they chose this particular story as a way to further reveal Emma's history, as she lacked a fairytale counterpart. Morrison explained, "They're using Hansel and Gretel as they did Cinderella to reveal some of Emma's backstory. So what Emma goes through to try to help these children ends up becoming very personal for her, as her own life [as a foster kid] is in a sense revealed."

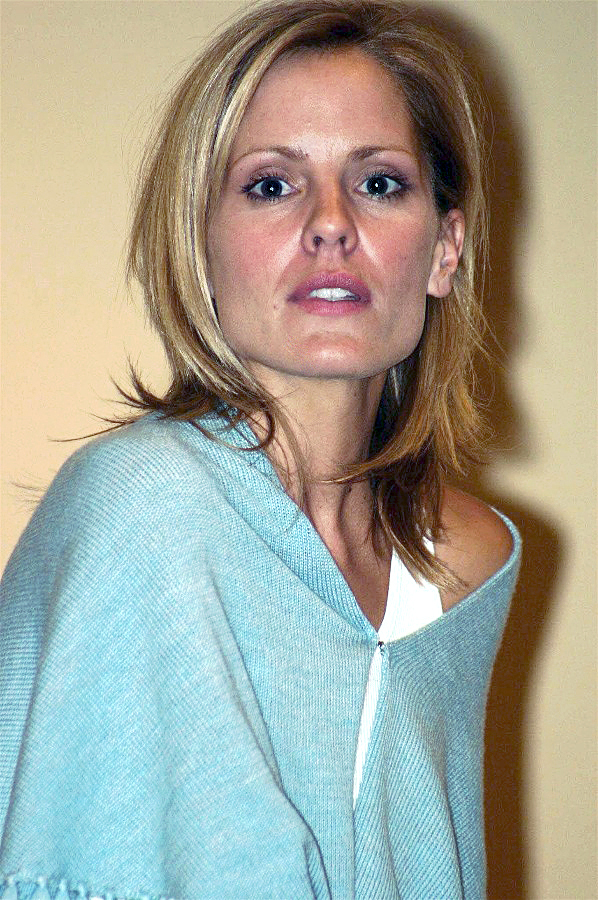
Actress Emma Caulfield guest starred in "True North" as the Blind Witch who tries to eat Hansel and Gretel.

For the Blind Witch, Kitsis and co-creator Adam Horowitz cast actress Emma Caulfield, as they had been "huge fans" of hers since she had co-starred on Buffy the Vampire Slayer. Kitsis commented, "We couldn't think of anyone better to trap two children in a house and try to eat them." Caulfield had previously worked with series writer Jane Espenson and producer Liz Tigelaar on Buffy and Life Unexpected. Morrison remarked that while viewers do not see the Blind Witch in Maine, "Everyone who is in fairytale land definitely has a Storybrooke counterpart. Whether or not we see them immediately doesn't mean they don't exist."

The exterior of the gingerbread house was based on concept art created by production designer Michael Joy. While this ended up being computer-generated, Joy and set decorator Mark Lane created a physical set for the interior using an "inside-out cake" as inspiration. The two always enjoyed adding in small details for careful viewers to notice, so in "True North" they used the cookies Hansel and Gretel baked in Storybrooke as part of the house's interior design. Joy explained, "We're always trying to find ways to link the two worlds. The audience loves that kind of stuff."

In October 2011, TV Guide reported that Eion Bailey would be joining the series in a multi-episode arc; "True North" featured his first appearance as the Stranger. Other guest stars included Quinn Lord as Nicholas/Hansel, Karley Scott Collins as Ava/Gretel, Nicholas Lea as Michael Tillman/Woodcutter, Gabe Khouth as Mr. Clark/Sneezy, and David Bloom as Mr. "K" Krzyszkowski. Lord and Collins had previously guest starred in two Fringe episodes, as younger versions of Peter Bishop and Olivia Dunham. Collins appeared in "Subject 13" alongside another actor who played Peter.

== Cultural references ==
Besides the main storyline being a retelling of the Hansel and Gretel fairytale, the episode contained a number of other cultural references. A rack full of Marvel Comics, including Ultimate Wolverine vs. Hulk, are shown in the opening scene, a double reference to both Marvel's parent company, Disney and the comic book's writer, Damon Lindelof, co-creator of Lost. An Apollo Bar was among the stolen items, and the Stranger's motorcycle license plate reads 23, both also references to Lost. Other comic books seen on the convenience store rack include various issues of Dazzler, Power Pack, West Coast Avengers, and Ka-Zar.

== Reception ==
=== Ratings ===
"True North" first aired on January 15, 2012 in the United States. It earned a Nielsen rating of 3.3/8 among adults between the ages of 18 and 49, meaning that it was seen by 3.3 percent of all 18- to 49-year-olds, and 8 percent of all 18- to 49-year-olds watching television at the time of broadcast. It was viewed by an estimated 9.84 million people, down 11 percent from the previous episode. Once Upon a Time finished fourth in its timeslot among total viewers and third among adults. It aired at the same time as the 69th Golden Globe Awards, which earned 16.8 million viewers. In Canada, the episode finished in thirteenth place for the week with an estimated 1.5 million viewers, an increase from the 1.297 million of the previous episode.

=== Reviews ===
"True North" received mixed to negative reviews from television critics.

Entertainment Weekly writer Hilary Busis wished the episode "had done more to move the show's master plot forward, especially since watching it meant missing the first hour of the Golden Globes." Busis also wished that Caulfield had received more screen time, calling her performance "superbly creepy." IGN columnist Amy Ratcliffe rated the episode 6.5/10, explaining that the tone was "over-the-top" and Emma's actions to hide the children, rather than report them, "out of character." Ratcliffe added on a more positive note that the Hansel and Gretel storyline was a "safe choice, but they made it work." Cassandra Scrimgeour of The Huffington Post found "Parrilla's emotional reaction to the children's rejection [to be] so effective that despite her evil ways, I actually felt sorry for her." Scrimgeour concluded that "the most intriguing thing to happen" in the episode was the arrival of the Stranger.

Oliver Sava of The A.V. Club was more critical of the episode, and gave it a D. He called the visual effects "hilariously bad," likening the CGI to "a '90s computer game." Sava added, "As mediocre as the series has been, it was on a bit of an upswing with the last few episodes, but 'True North' is a big step backwards... The problem isn't that these kids can't act (although that might be the problem), it's that the writing for their characters is horrible... This week's episode is straight-up children's television, and not in the way that it can be enjoyed by all ages. You need to be a child to suspend your disbelief long enough to watch 'True North.'" Despite the critique, Sava did enjoy Caulfield's scenes, as well as Emma and Mary Margaret's conversation concerning motherhood. Writing for The Wall Street Journal, Gwen Orel opined that the Hansel and Gretel "parallel is clear and rather sweet, with touches of the ongoing story of Emma and Snow White, too." Orel felt the episode seemed "like a demented episode of Chopped," and called the gingerbread house "just like it should [be], colorful and candylike."

== Cast ==
=== Starring ===
- Ginnifer Goodwin as Snow White (archive footage)/Mary Margaret Blanchard
- Jennifer Morrison as Emma Swan
- Lana Parrilla as Evil Queen/Regina Mills/Stepmother
- Josh Dallas (credit only)
- Jared S. Gilmore as Henry Mills
- Raphael Sbarge (credit only)
- Robert Carlyle as Mr. Gold

=== Guest Starring ===
- Lee Arenberg as Grumpy (archive footage)
- Eion Bailey as Stranger
- Emma Caulfield as The Blind Witch
- Karley Scott Collins as Gretel/Ava Zimmer
- Nicholas Lea as the Woodcutter/Michael Tillman
- Quinn Lord as Hansel/Nicholas Zimmer

=== Co-Starring ===
- David Bloom as Mr. Krzyszkowski
- Osmond Lloyd Bramble as Queen's Guard
- Michael Coleman as Happy (archive footage)
- Faustino di Bauda as Sleepy (archive footage)
- David-Paul Grove as Doc (archive footage)
- Jeffrey Kaiser as Dopey (archive footage)
- Gabe Khouth as Sneezy* (archive footage)/Mr. Clark
- Mig Macario as Bashful* (archive footage)
