= Once Upon a Time season 1 =

Once Upon a Time
- Season 1
- DVD cover
- Starring: Ginnifer Goodwin; Jennifer Morrison; Lana Parrilla; Josh Dallas; Jared S. Gilmore; Raphael Sbarge; Jamie Dornan; Robert Carlyle; Eion Bailey
- No. of episodes: 22

Release
- Original network: ABC
- Original release: October 23, 2011 – May 13, 2012

Season chronology
- Next → Season 2

The first season of the American ABC fantasy-drama series Once Upon a Time premiered on October 23, 2011, and concluded on May 13, 2012. Principal cast members for the season include Ginnifer Goodwin, Jennifer Morrison, Lana Parrilla, Josh Dallas, Jared S. Gilmore, Raphael Sbarge, Jamie Dornan, Robert Carlyle, and Eion Bailey. This season is the only one to feature Sbarge, Dornan, and Bailey in a regular capacity. The season centers around the Enchanted Forest and Storybrooke, and the Evil Queen (Parrilla)'s plot to destroy everyone's happiness so she can be the only one with a happy ending.

Once Upon a Time's first season received generally favorable reviews from critics who praised its cast, visuals, and twists on fairy tales, though some criticized its uneven tone. The pilot episode was watched by 12.93 million viewers and achieved an adult 18–49 rating/share of 4.0/10. Those numbers dipped late in the season to a series low of 8.36 million viewers and a 2.8/8 adult 18–49 rating/share in April 2012, but rebounded slightly for the season finale with 9.66 million viewers and a 3.3/10 adult 18–49 rating/share.

== Plot ==
All of the classic fairy tales and other stories exist together in the same continuity, though many of the events played out slightly different to how the stories are told in our world. The structure of the show cuts back and forth between the events happening in the real world and the corresponding events that happened in the fairy tale world.

On the night of her 28th birthday, bail bonds collector Emma Swan (Jennifer Morrison) is reunited with Henry Mills (Jared S. Gilmore)—the son she gave up for adoption ten years previous—who takes her back to his hometown of Storybrooke, Maine.

Henry possesses a large book of fairy tales, suspecting that Emma is the daughter of Snow White (Ginnifer Goodwin) and Prince Charming (Josh Dallas), who sent her away so she would be protected from a powerful curse enacted by the Evil Queen (Lana Parrilla), a curse in which the queen is the only one with a happy ending. Because of the curse, everyone in Storybrooke is frozen in time with no memories of their former selves—except for the Queen, who is Storybrooke's mayor and Henry's adoptive mother, Regina Mills. Emma of course considers this theory to be completely outlandish and returns Henry home, but she still decides to remain in the New England town after becoming attached to him. This action causes the hands of the clock tower to move for the first time in 28 years. Henry also tells Emma that they are the only people who can leave Storybrooke, as others who try will suffer accidents.

In the fairy tale world, it is revealed that Snow and Charming, concerned for the safety of their unborn child, went to seek advice from the imprisoned trickster Rumpelstiltskin (Robert Carlyle). In exchange for the child's name, he told them their only hope was the child, who would return on her 28th birthday and begin "The Final Battle". The child, an infant girl, is born on the day the Queen enacts her curse and is placed in a wardrobe carved out of an enchanted tree which takes the child to our world, where she grew up in the foster system, rebelled in her teen years, and ended up having Henry at 18.

In Storybrooke, Emma is soon elected as Sheriff following the sudden death of the previous Sheriff, Graham Humbert (Jamie Dornan), believed by Henry to be the Huntsman. Regina's antagonistic attitude raises Emma's suspicions and prompts her to move in with Henry's teacher Mary Margaret Blanchard, believed by Henry to be her mother, Snow White. Regina's bitter rivalry with Storybrooke's wealthiest resident, Mr. Gold, becomes heated when she learns he is still aware of his true identity as Rumplestiltskin. Mary Margaret falls in love with David Nolan, a coma patient who is really Prince Charming. David wakes up after she reads Henry's fairytale book to him as a favor to Henry. David, however, is married to Kathryn Nolan, the woman who is (in the fairy tale world) his ex-fiancée Princess Abigail, daughter of King Midas. Unable to deny their love, David and Mary Margaret soon begin a secret relationship that becomes public and upsets Kathryn.

Kathryn eventually decides to go to Boston and let David be with Mary Margaret only to disappear before leaving Storybrooke. Sometime later, an antique jewelry box that belonged to Mary Margaret when she was a child is found buried near the old toll bridge and is revealed to contain a human heart, which is proven to be Kathryn's via DNA testing. Mary Margaret is arrested for Kathryn's supposed murder and hires Mr. Gold as her attorney. As Mary Margaret is about to be prosecuted by corrupt District Attorney Albert Spencer (Alan Dale), Kathryn is found alive in an alley. It is revealed that Regina and Mr. Gold plotted to frame Mary Margaret and force her out of Storybrooke, but Mr. Gold double-crossed Regina and let Kathryn go to exonerate Mary Margaret. When Daily Mirror chief editor Sidney Glass (Giancarlo Esposito), previously the Magic Mirror, confesses to having abducted Kathryn to jump-start his career, Emma is not convinced. She concludes that Regina orchestrated the conspiracy and forced Sidney to "confess".

Emma soon discovers that writer August W. Booth (Eion Bailey), who is the first stranger ever to arrive in town after she did, is from the Enchanted Forest as well: he is Pinocchio, who was sent to our world through the same wardrobe that brought Emma to watch over her. He abandoned her out of fear and is slowly turning back into a wooden puppet as a result. Emma then attempts to take Henry out of Storybrooke forever but is then forced to reconsider when he refuses to go. She finally makes a deal with Regina, in which she agrees to leave but will still get to visit Henry on occasion.

Since Regina knows Emma's true identity, however, she retrieves her poisoned apple (the same one she used on Snow White) to use on Emma in the form of an apple turnover. Henry, desperate to prove to Emma that the curse is real, takes a bite of the turnover and collapses to the floor unconscious. Emma, who now starts to believe after seeing flashbacks of her true past, is forced to ally with Regina to save Henry and retrieve Rumplestiltskin's true love potion from Maleficent, imprisoned as a dragon underneath the Clock Tower. After slaying the dragon, Emma heads back to save Henry, but Mr. Gold intervenes and steals the potion, leaving Emma halfway up the elevator shaft and Regina tied to a chair and gagged.

When Henry is pronounced dead, Emma and Regina return to the hospital to say goodbye to his body. Emma kisses him on the forehead, causing a pulse of energy to engulf the entire town and restore everyone's true memories while freeing Henry from the effects of the poisoned apple. Snow and Charming reunite with each other, and Regina returns to her mansion alone as Emma begins to wonder why no one is returning to the Other World since the curse is broken. Rumplestiltskin reunites with his true love Belle (Emilie de Ravin) and takes her to a Wishing Well deep in the heart of the forest, a well with the power to restore that which one had lost. He takes the potion and drops it into the well, causing a purple cloud to emerge and consume Storybrooke as the clock strikes 8:15.

== Cast and characters ==
=== Main ===
- Ginnifer Goodwin as Snow White / Mary Margaret Blanchard
- Jennifer Morrison as Emma Swan
- Lana Parrilla as Regina Mills / Evil Queen
- Josh Dallas as David Nolan / Prince Charming (Note: Dallas also portrays Prince James, David's twin brother, in "The Shepherd")
- Jared S. Gilmore as Henry Mills
- Raphael Sbarge as Jiminy Cricket / Dr. Archie Hopper
- Jamie Dornan as Huntsman / Sheriff Graham Humbert (Note: Credited until "The Heart Is a Lonely Hunter" and as a guest star in "A Land Without Magic")
- Robert Carlyle as Rumplestiltskin / Mr. Gold
- Eion Bailey as Pinocchio / August Wayne Booth (Note: Credited as a recurring guest star from "True North" to "What Happened to Frederick" and later promoted to the main cast from "Dreamy")

=== Recurring ===
- Beverley Elliott as Widow Lucas / Granny
- Meghan Ory as Red Riding Hood / Ruby
- Lee Arenberg as Dreamy / Grumpy / Leroy
- Gabe Khouth as Sneezy / Tom Clark
- David Paul Grove as Doc
- Faustino Di Bauda as Sleepy / Walter
- Mig Macario as Bashful
- Michael Coleman as Happy
- Giancarlo Esposito as Genie / Magic Mirror / Sidney Glass
- Jeffrey Kasier as Dopey
- Anastasia Griffith as Princess Abigail / Kathryn Nolan
- Keegan Connor Tracy as Reul Ghorm / Blue Fairy / Mother Superior
- David Anders as Dr. Whale
- Alan Dale as King George / Albert Spencer
- Tony Perez as Henry
- Tony Amendola as Geppetto / Marco
- Emilie de Ravin as Belle / Patient
- Sebastian Stan as Jefferson / Mad Hatter

=== Guest ===
- Jakob Davies as Young Pinocchio / August Booth
- Kristin Bauer van Straten as Maleficent
- Jessy Schram as Cinderella / Ashley Boyd
- Tim Phillipps as Prince Thomas / Sean Hermann
- Dylan Schmidt as Baelfire
- Richard Schiff as King Leopold
- Barbara Hershey as Cora / Queen of Hearts (voice)
- Ingrid Torrance as Nurse Ratched
- Harry Groener as Martin
- Carolyn Hennesy as Myrna
- Gabrielle Rose as Ruth
- Jennifer Koenig as Queen of Hearts
- Alex Zahara as King Midas
- Brad Dourif as Zoso
- Karley Scott Collins as Gretel / Ava Zimmer
- Quinn Lord as Hansel / Nicholas Zimmer
- Emma Caulfield as the Blind Witch
- Geoff Gustafson as Stealthy
- Eric Keenleyside as Sir Maurice / Moe French
- Amy Acker as Nova / Sister Astrid
- Jesse Hutch as Peter
- Noah Bean as Daniel Colter
- Bailee Madison as Young Snow White
- Sage Brocklebank as Gaston
- Ted Whittall as the King
- Catherine Lough Haggquist as the Fairy Godmother

== Crew ==
Once Upon a Time is created and produced by Edward Kitsis and Adam Horowitz. In addition, Jane Espenson, Steve Pearlman, Kathy Gilroy, Damon Lindelof, and Brian Wankum are also producers. Liz Tigelaar also serve as series executive producers. Paul Kurta, Chad Oakes, Michael Frislev are producers, while Jordan Feiner and Keri Young are associate producers. Writers for season one episodes include: Kitsis, Horowitz, Espenson, Liz Tigelaar, David H. Goodman, Andrew Chambliss, and Ian Goldberg, with Daniel T. Thomsen writing an episode teleplay.

== Episodes ==
No. overall	No. in season	Title	Directed by	Written by	Original release date	US viewers (millions)
1	1	"Pilot"	Mark Mylod	Edward Kitsis & Adam Horowitz	October 23, 2011	12.94
For bail bonds collector Emma Swan, life has been anything but a happy ending. But on the night of her twenty-eighth birthday, an encounter with a child claiming to be the son she gave up for adoption ten years earlier leads her to a town shrouded in mystery where fairytales are to be believed.
2	2	"The Thing You Love Most"	Greg Beeman	Edward Kitsis & Adam Horowitz	October 30, 2011	11.74
Regina does everything in her power to force Emma out of Storybrooke and out of her and Henry's lives forever while the events surrounding the completion of the Dark Curse are revealed along with a revelation that forces the Evil Queen to choose between exacting her revenge or protecting the thing she loves most.
3	3	"Snow Falls"	Dean White	Liz Tigelaar	November 6, 2011	11.45
Emma gets a bigger reaction than she expected after convincing Mary Margaret to read to a comatose John Doe, while the events surrounding the fateful first encounter between Snow White and Prince Charming are revealed along with an enterprising quest that promises to change their lives.
4	4	"The Price of Gold"	David Solomon	David H. Goodman	November 13, 2011	11.36
Emma tries to help a young woman after learning that her unborn child is caught in the center of a dangerous transaction while a series of events are revealed in which a servant girl turned princess struggles to break an impulsive deal she made after unearthing a sinister ulterior motive.
5	5	"That Still Small Voice"	Paul Edwards	Jane Espenson	November 27, 2011	10.69
Emma settles into her new role as Deputy Sheriff only to find herself thrust to the front lines, and Henry places his life in danger after his beliefs are shattered while a series of events are revealed in which a young man is presented with a choice that could help him become the person he wants to be, but at a price that promises to haunt him forever.
6	6	"The Shepherd"	Victor Nelli	Andrew Chambliss & Ian Goldberg	December 4, 2011	9.66
David struggles with his demons as he attempts to balance his strained marriage with Kathryn and his blossoming relationship with Mary Margaret while a series of events are revealed in which a meek shepherd receives a shattering revelation that forces him to choose between living a life of royalty or forging his destiny.
7	7	"The Heart Is a Lonely Hunter"	David M. Barrett	Edward Kitsis & Adam Horowitz	December 11, 2011	8.92
Graham calls his well-being into question as the lines separating fantasy from reality suddenly start to blur while a series of events are revealed in which the Evil Queen recruits a heartless assassin to execute Snow White and sparks a chain of events that threaten to come with consequences for everyone involved.
8	8	"Desperate Souls"	Michael Waxman	Jane Espenson	January 8, 2012	10.35
Emma decides to run for a coveted Storybrooke public office following a devastating tragedy, and Regina engages in dirty politics after Gold makes a bold move while a series of events are revealed in which a cowardly spinner embarks on a quest to help his son avert the horrors of a meaningless war.
9	9	"True North"	Dean White	David H. Goodman & Liz Tigelaar	January 15, 2012	9.83
Emma reaches into her scarred past as she helps two homeless children search for their biological father while a series of events are revealed in which two children are coerced into stealing a prized artifact from a witch who is more than she appears to be.
10	10	"7:15 A.M."	Ralph Hemecker	Story by : Edward Kitsis & Adam Horowitz; Teleplay by : Daniel T. Thomsen	January 22, 2012	9.33
Mary Margaret grapples with her feelings for David and Emma grows increasingly suspicious of the Stranger while the events surrounding Prince Charming's wedding are revealed along with Snow White's struggle to ease her breaking heart and an offer that sets her on a path from which there is no coming back.
11	11	"Fruit of the Poisonous Tree"	Bryan Spicer	Ian Goldberg & Andrew Chambliss	January 29, 2012	10.91
Emma finds herself forced to work with Daily Mirror editor Sidney Glass after he offers to help her expose Regina's corruption while a series of events are revealed in which a Genie is freed from the confines of a magic oil lamp and provokes an undeniable passion that threatens to destroy his chance of finding love.
12	12	"Skin Deep"	Milan Cheylov	Jane Espenson	February 12, 2012	8.65
Emma sets out to prevent Gold from seeking vigilante justice after one of his most prized possessions is stolen, and Mary Margaret plans a Valentine's Day-themed girls' night out while a series of events are revealed in which a courageous noblewoman makes a fateful deal and forges a personal bond that blossoms into something more.
13	13	"What Happened to Frederick"	Dean White	David H. Goodman	February 19, 2012	9.84
David faces a difficult decision about his future; Regina sets a plan in motion to keep David and Mary Margaret apart; and Emma becomes more intrigued with the Stranger while the events surrounding Prince Charming's search for Snow White are revealed along with a mission to help his ex-fiancée recover something precious that was lost to her.
14	14	"Dreamy"	David Solomon	Edward Kitsis & Adam Horowitz	March 4, 2012	10.67
Mary Margaret works with resident drunk Leroy to organize the Miner's Day Festival, and Emma questions whom she can trust as she looks into Kathryn's disappearance while Grumpy's backstory is revealed along with a forbidden romance that forces him to choose between loyalty or love.
15	15	"Red-Handed"	Ron Underwood	Jane Espenson	March 11, 2012	9.29
Emma struggles to help resident party girl Ruby discover what she's good at in life while a series of events are revealed in which a young woman juggles dealing with her devoted sweetheart, her determined grandmother, and a ferocious wolf on a killing spree.
16	16	"Heart of Darkness"	Dean White	Andrew Chambliss & Ian Goldberg	March 18, 2012	8.69
Emma arrests Mary Margaret for Kathryn's suspected murder after the investigation turns into something infinitely more sinister; David questions everything and everyone he thought he could trust; and Gold convinces Mary Margaret to accept his legal services while the events surrounding Prince Charming's search for Snow White continue to be revealed along with his quest to prevent her from assassinating the Evil Queen.
17	17	"Hat Trick"	Ralph Hemecker	Vladimir Cvetko & David H. Goodman	March 25, 2012	8.82
Emma and Mary Margaret struggle to stay alive when a cartographer with an affinity for hats and a sinister ulterior motive abducts them while a series of events are revealed in which a man of magic is coerced into stealing a prized artifact from the villainous Queen of Hearts.
18	18	"The Stable Boy"	Dean White	Edward Kitsis & Adam Horowitz	April 1, 2012	8.36
Emma searches for evidence that will prove Mary Margaret's innocence, and Regina initiates the final stage of her vendetta while the events surrounding the fateful first meeting between Snow White and the Evil Queen are revealed along with a devastating betrayal that promises to define their relationship.
19	19	"The Return"	Paul Edwards	Jane Espenson	April 22, 2012	9.08
Gold sets out to learn more about August after unearthing a connection to his past; Emma confronts Regina about her involvement in Kathryn's disappearance; and David tries to reconcile with Mary Margaret while a series of events are revealed in which Rumplestiltskin agrees to help Baelfire find a way to give up his powers.
20	20	"The Stranger"	Gwyneth Horder-Payton	Ian B. Goldberg & Andrew Chambliss	April 29, 2012	9.20
August makes it his mission to help Emma break the curse while a series of events are revealed in which Geppetto agrees to help devise a plan that will protect Snow White and Prince Charming's unborn daughter from the Evil Queen's Dark Curse on the condition that his son be spared as well.
21	21	"An Apple Red as Blood"	Milan Cheylov	Jane Espenson & David H. Goodman	May 6, 2012	8.95
Henry takes drastic measures to prevent Emma from leaving Storybrooke, and Regina devises a last-minute scheme while a series of events are revealed in which Snow White spearheads a quest to save her true love and defeat the Evil Queen in one fell swoop.
22	22	"A Land Without Magic"	Dean White	Edward Kitsis & Adam Horowitz	May 13, 2012	9.67
Emma and Regina forge an alliance in an attempt to save Henry's life; Mary Margaret and David face a difficult decision about their future; and Gold makes a bold move while the events surrounding Prince Charming's search for Snow White reach a dramatic conclusion.

== Reception ==
=== Critical response ===
Rotten Tomatoes gave the season an approval rating of 80% based on 35 reviews, with an average rating of 6.06/10. The site's critical consensus reads, "Charming and fantastical, Once Upon a Time is tonally uneven but derives strength from an outstanding cast and handsome visuals."

Metacritic gave it a score of 66 out of 100 based on 26 critics, indicating "generally favorable" reviews. Washington Post's Hank Stuever called the series "a smartly-crafted reward for fans of light fantasy, with the right mix of cleverness, action and romance." Verne Gay of Newsday said the series "glows with a near-theatrical shine, challenging viewers to think about TV drama as something other than boilerplate." Several feminist outlets were pleased with the show for its feminist twist on fairy tales. Avital Norman Nathman of Bitch stated that she liked the show for "infusing a feminist sensibility" into the stories. Feministing's Genie Leslie commented that Emma was a "badass", that she liked how Emma was "very adamant that women be able to make their own decisions about their lives and their children", and how Emma was a "well-rounded" character who was "feminine, but not 'girly'". Natalie Wilson from Ms. praised the show for a strong, "kick-butt" female lead, for including multiple strong women who take turns doing the saving with the men, for subverting the fetishization of true love, and for dealing with the idea of what makes a mother in a more nuanced fashion. Wilson went on to state about the lead: "Her pursuit of a 'happy ending' is not about finding a man or going to a ball all gussied up, but about detective work, about building a relationship with her son Henry, and about seeking the 'truth' as to why time stands still in the corrupt Storybrooke world.

=== Ratings ===
Viewership and ratings per episode of Once Upon a Time season 1
No.	Title	Air date	Rating/share (18–49)	Viewers (millions)	DVR (18–49)	DVR viewers (millions)	Total (18–49)	Total viewers (millions)
1	"Pilot"	October 23, 2011	4.0	12.94	1.2	2.54	5.2	15.48
2	"The Thing You Love Most"	October 30, 2011	3.9	11.74	1.1	2.36	5.0	14.10
3	"Snow Falls"	November 6, 2011	3.8	11.45	1.0	2.62	4.8	14.07
4	"The Price of Gold"	November 13, 2011	3.8	11.36	1.1	2.54	4.9	13.90
5	"That Still Small Voice"	November 27, 2011	3.4	10.69	1.1	2.56	4.5	13.24
6	"The Shepherd"	December 4, 2011	3.2	9.66	1.0	2.43	4.2	12.08
7	"The Heart Is a Lonely Hunter"	December 11, 2011	2.9	8.91	1.2	2.72	4.1	11.64
8	"Desperate Souls"	January 8, 2012	3.7	10.35	1.3	2.86	5.0	13.21
9	"True North"	January 15, 2012	3.3	9.83	1.4	2.99	4.7	12.82
10	"7:15 A.M."	January 22, 2012	3.2	9.33	1.3	2.99	4.5	12.32
11	"Fruit of the Poisonous Tree"	January 29, 2012	3.5	10.91	1.2	2.56	4.7	13.47
12	"Skin Deep"	February 12, 2012	3.0	8.65	1.3	2.99	4.3	11.64
13	"What Happened to Frederick"	February 19, 2012	3.1	9.84	1.1	2.61	4.2	12:45
14	"Dreamy"	March 4, 2012	3.4	10.67	1.2	2.55	4.6	13.21
15	"Red-Handed"	March 11, 2012	2.9	9.29	1.1	2.63	4.0	11.92
16	"Heart of Darkness"	March 18, 2012	2.9	8.69	1.1	2.27	4.0	10.96
17	"Hat Trick"	March 25, 2012	2.9	8.82	1.1	2.38	4.0	11.20
18	"The Stable Boy"	April 1, 2012	2.8	8.36	1.0	2.31	3.8	10.67
19	"The Return"	April 22, 2012	3.0	9.08	1.0	2.51	4.0	11.59
20	"The Stranger"	April 29, 2012	3.0	9.20	0.9	2.10	3.9	11.29
21	"An Apple Red As Blood"	May 6, 2012	3.0	8.95	1.1	2.47	4.1	11.42
22	"A Land Without Magic"	May 13, 2012	3.3	9.67	1.0	2.20	4.3	11.87

== Soundtrack ==
=== Extended play ===
Once Upon a Time (Music from the TV Series)

EP / Soundtrack album by Mark Isham
- Released: February 14, 2012
- Label: ABC Studios

All tracks are written by Mark Isham.

No.	Title	Length
1.	"The Queen's Curse"	2:47
2.	"Once Upon a Time Orchestral Suite"	3:49
3.	"Belle's Story"	2:39
4.	"Things Are Changing in Storybrooke"	1:53

=== Album ===
Once Upon a Time: Original Television Soundtrack

Soundtrack album by Mark Isham
- Released: May 1, 2012
- Length: 62:54
- Label: Intrada

The album was released with five different collectible covers.

All tracks are written by Mark Isham.

No.	Title	Length
1.	"Once Upon a Time Orchestral Suite"	4:13
2.	"Henry's Proposal"	1:17
3.	"The Queen's Curse"	2:46
4.	"Jiminy Cricket"	3:11
5.	"Dealing with Rumplestiltskin"	3:26
6.	"Belle's Story"	2:37
7.	"Dwarves"	2:45
8.	"The Huntsman"	4:31
9.	"Things Are Changing in Storybrooke"	1:47
10.	"Cinderella"	1:44
11.	"Wedding Dance"	1:21
12.	"Advising Ashley"	2:26
13.	"If the Shoe Fits"	1:35
14.	"Unhappy Endings"	3:46
15.	"Emma and Henry"	1:43
16.	"The Siren"	5:07
17.	"The Man with the Wooden Box"	1:11
18.	"Hope Will Return"	1:48
19.	"Rumplestiltskin in Love"	2:19
20.	"The Genie's Wishes"	1:58
21.	"The Road to True Love"	2:50
22.	"The Family Compass"	2:00
23.	"Burn the Witch"	2:34
24.	"What the Queen Loves Most"	2:30
25.	"The Clock Moves"	1:12

== Novelization ==
Once Upon a Time debuted a fantasy novel from Disney-owned Hyperion Books. Titled Reawakened, the novel covers the first season and promises to give "fans of the show a whole new look at their favorite characters and stories". The narrative is told from the points-of-view of Emma Swan in Storybrooke and Snow White in the Enchanted Forest. Written by Odette Beane, the novel was published on April 27, 2013, in e-book format and on May 7, 2013, in paperback form.

== Home video releases ==
Once Upon a Time: Chapter 1 – The First Five Episodes
Set details	Special features	
Discs: 1; Episodes: 5	Audio Commentary; On "Pilot" by Edward Kitsis and Adam Horowitz	
DVD release dates
Region 1	Region 2	Region 4
February 14, 2012	TBA	TBA

Once Upon a Time – The Complete First Season
Set details	Special features	
Discs: 5 / 6 (R2/4 / AU); Episodes: 22	Once Upon a Time: Origins (Blu-ray only); Fairy Tales in the Modern World; Building Character; Welcome to Storybrooke; The Story I Remember...Snow White; Fairest Bloopers of Them All; Audio Commentaries; On "Pilot" by Edward Kitsis and Adam Horowitz; On "7:15 A.M."; On "Skin Deep"; On "The Stable Boy"; On "A Land Without Magic"; Deleted Scenes	
DVD release dates
Region 1	Region 2	Region 4
August 28, 2012	November 12, 2012	October 17, 2012
Blu-ray release dates
Region A		Region B
August 28, 2012		October 17, 2012 (AU) / June 17, 2013 (UK)
