= Desperate Souls =

- Once Upon a Time episode
- Episode no.: Season 1 Episode 8
- Directed by: Michael Waxman
- Written by: Jane Espenson
- Original air date: January 8, 2012

Guest appearances
- Brad Dourif as Old Beggar/Zoso/Dark One; Giancarlo Esposito as Sidney Glass; Beverley Elliott as Granny; Ty Olsson as Hordor; Meghan Ory as Ruby; Dylan Schmid as Baelfire

Episode chronology
← Previous "The Heart Is a Lonely Hunter"	Next → "True North"
- Once Upon a Time season 1

"Desperate Souls" is the eighth episode of the first season of the American Fairy Tale/Drama television series Once Upon a Time. It was written by consulting producer Jane Espenson, and was directed by Michael Waxman. Espenson wrote it to give viewers some "crucial facts" about Rumpelstiltskin's origins. Guest stars included Brad Dourif, Giancarlo Esposito, Beverley Elliott, Ty Olsson, Meghan Ory, and Dylan Schmid.

The series takes place in the fictional seaside town of Storybrooke, Maine, in which the residents are actually characters from various fairy tales that were transported to the "real world" town by a powerful curse. In this episode, Emma Swan (Jennifer Morrison) runs for Sheriff against Regina's (Lana Parrilla) candidate, Sidney Glass (Esposito). Meanwhile, in the episode's flashbacks, Rumpelstiltskin's (Robert Carlyle) backstory is revealed.

"Desperate Souls" first aired in the United States on ABC on January 8, 2012. Its broadcast was watched by an estimated 10.35 million viewers, a 29 percent increase from the previous episode. Television critics gave mostly positive reviews to the episode; most praised Carlyle's performance, but one noted that the storytelling was beginning to "feel stale."

== Title card ==
The Dark One of the Enchanted Forest walks through the trees.

== Plot ==
=== In Storybrooke ===
It has been two weeks since Sheriff Graham's (Jamie Dornan) death, and the citizens of Storybrooke continue to mourn. Mr. Gold (Robert Carlyle) convinces Emma Swan (Jennifer Morrison) she ought to be sheriff, but Regina (Lana Parrilla) has already appointed Sidney Glass (Giancarlo Esposito) for the job. Henry (Jared S. Gilmore) suspects Regina is responsible for Graham's death and starts to believe good cannot defeat evil because good plays by the rules. Gold offers Emma his support and reveals to her the town charter which states the Mayor can only choose a candidate for Sheriff and therefore an election must be held. Emma decides to run, so Regina declares Sidney Glass will as well. Henry becomes worried when he finds out Gold is Emma's benefactor, considering how dangerous it is to owe him one favor, let alone two. Regina is furious that Gold would work against her.

Gold's plan was to set a fire at the Mayor's office with Emma there, knowing her conscience would force her to save Regina and look like a hero. This goes off perfectly, making Emma the town favorite going into the debate. When she finds out that Gold did this, Emma realizes Henry might be right about evil not playing by the rules. At the debate, Sidney explains what would make him the best sheriff following Regina's script to the letter. Emma reveals to the public that Gold set the fire, demonstrating her own honesty and integrity as well as Gold's ruthlessness. Later that evening at Granny's Cafe, Emma consoles herself with liquor when Henry walks in with the walkie talkies, saying that he was proud of her and they might continue "Operation Cobra." Regina, Archie (Raphael Sbarge), Mary Margaret (Ginnifer Goodwin) and Sidney arrive to tell Emma she was elected Sheriff. Regina gives her the badge and admits they have one thing in common: their distrust of Gold. Emma receives a visit from her new ally who reveals the rest of his plan. Gold knew Emma would do the right thing and tell everyone what he did, winning her the election. He also tells her that while the town feared Regina, they feared him more. In standing up to him, Emma became even more compelling to the townsfolk than when she rescued Regina. Now that Emma is Sheriff, Gold expects to be paid back for his favors.

=== In the characters' past ===
In the Enchanted Forest, Rumpelstiltskin's (Carlyle) backstory is revealed. During the ogre wars, the children that live in the Frontlands are conscripted to military service at age 14. The Duke's men gather young soldiers with the help of "The Dark One" who possesses great magical power. Rumpelstiltskin's son, Baelfire (Dylan Schmid), will turn 14 in three days and he is desperate to keep his child out of battle. As father and son flee from the village, they are confronted by the Duke's men. They mock Rumpelstiltskin for running away when he was supposed to serve, and reveal that his cowardice caused his wife to leave him. Rumpelstiltskin begs for his son's life but he has nothing to offer but fealty. The Duke's chief soldier commands Rumpelstiltskin to kiss his boot, but when the desperate man bends down the soldier kicks him to the ground. The old beggar (Brad Dourif) by the side of the road sees this and offers the pair assistance since they spared him a coin. The beggar tells Rumpelstiltskin a secret, the Duke possesses a dagger that allows him to command The Dark One and all his power. If Rumpelstiltskin steals the dagger, he will control The Dark One himself. If he kills The Dark One with the dagger, he will possess his magic. Rumpelstiltskin sets fire to the Duke's castle (in a parallel with Mr. Gold's actions) and steals the dagger which reads the name of The Dark One, "Zoso".

Baelfire is worried about his father's plan to wield the dagger's power but Rumpelstiltskin just sends him home. Rumpelstiltskin summons Zoso and declares he is The Dark One's master. Zoso is not impressed and wonders aloud what the timid little man would have him do. Rumpelstiltskin's answer is "Die!" He kills The Dark One who reveals himself to be the beggar from before. Zoso laughs and tells Rumpelstiltskin that "All magic comes with a price." Rumpelstiltskin becomes the new Dark One and his name is now inscribed on the dagger. He returns home and uses his power to save his son from the Duke's men. Baelfire is terrified of this man who no longer seems like his father at all.

== Production ==
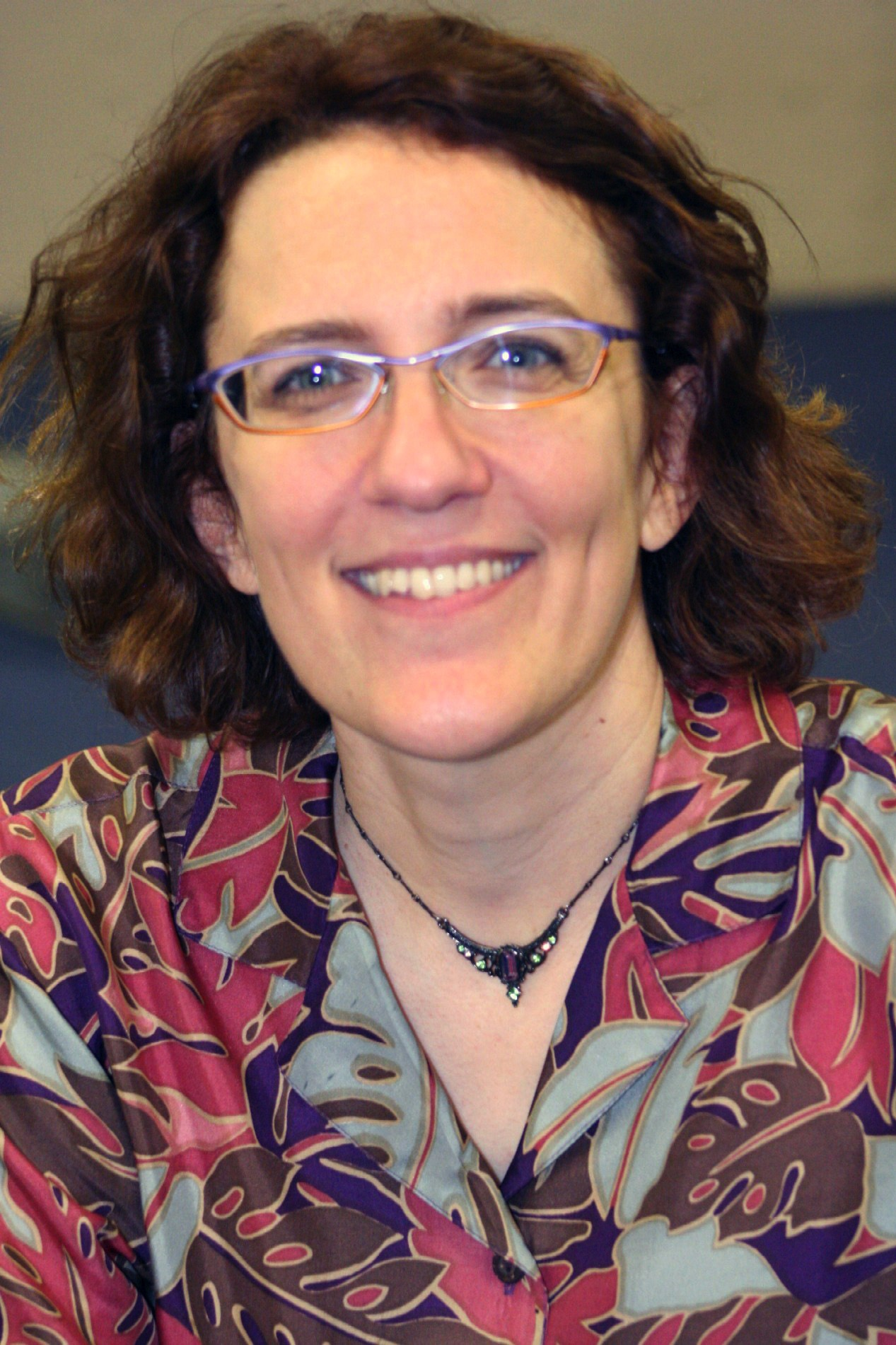
Consulting producer Jane Espenson wrote "Desperate Souls," her second such credit for the series.

"Desperate Souls" was written by consulting producer Jane Espenson, while Friday Night Lights veteran Michael Waxman served as director. The episode was Espenson's second writing credit for the series at that point. She intended the episode to reveal "some crucial facts about where Rumpel comes from," believing him to be "a wild card" whose "ulterior motives are still always very complicated."

"Desperate Souls" partly deals with the aftermath of Sheriff Graham's death from the previous episode. Though her character is associated with evil, actress Lana Parrilla attempted to keep Regina as human as possible. She clarified, "You will see how there is a genuine love and care for Graham…There was a physical connection to the character. He did become sort of a boy toy in both worlds. But, you know, at the end of the day, in Storybrooke, she’s still trying to fill this void that Maleficent warned her about." Leading up to the episode broadcast, Parrilla also gave a preview of what viewers could expect. Of the episode's plot, she explained, "We will be seeing some dirty politics between Regina and Mr. Gold. You’re going to see how threatening that is to Regina, and, as you know, she really takes on these challenges full force."

In early October 2011, TV Guide reported that actor Brad Dourif would be making a guest appearance as a "beggar who befriends evil Rumpelstiltskin." Other guest stars included Meghan Ory as Ruby, Patti Allan as Miss Ginger, Beverley Elliott as Granny, Giancarlo Esposito as Sidney, Dylan Schmid as Baelfire, Conner Dwelly as Morraine, Ty Olsson as Hordor, Michael Phenicie as The Duke (scenes deleted), C. Ernst Harth as Burly Man, David-Paul Grove as Doc, and Gabe Khouth as Mr. Clark. The episode was included in Reawakened: A Once Upon a Time Tale – a novelization of the first season – which was published by Hyperion Books in 2013.

== Cultural references ==
Morraine, Baelfire, and the Dark One are inspired by the Wheel of Time series by Robert Jordan. A large Mickey Mouse figurine and small Minnie Mouse figurine are visible during Emma's confrontation with Gold over the fire. Zoso, the name of the Dark One, is a reference to the band Led Zeppelin, as it is a nickname for the guitarist Jimmy Page.

== Reception ==
=== Ratings ===
"Desperate Souls" first aired in the United States on January 8, 2012. It earned a 3.7/8 among 18-49s and an overall 5.9/9 rating, with an estimated 10.35 million viewers. It ranked second in its timeslot, beaten by NFL Overrun on CBS but ahead of Dateline NBC and The Simpsons and The Cleveland Show on Fox. Once Upon a Time's ratings were up 28 percent compared to the last original episode. In Canada, the episode finished in eighteenth place for the week with 1.297 million viewers, a decrease from the 1.6 million of the previous episode.

=== Reviews ===
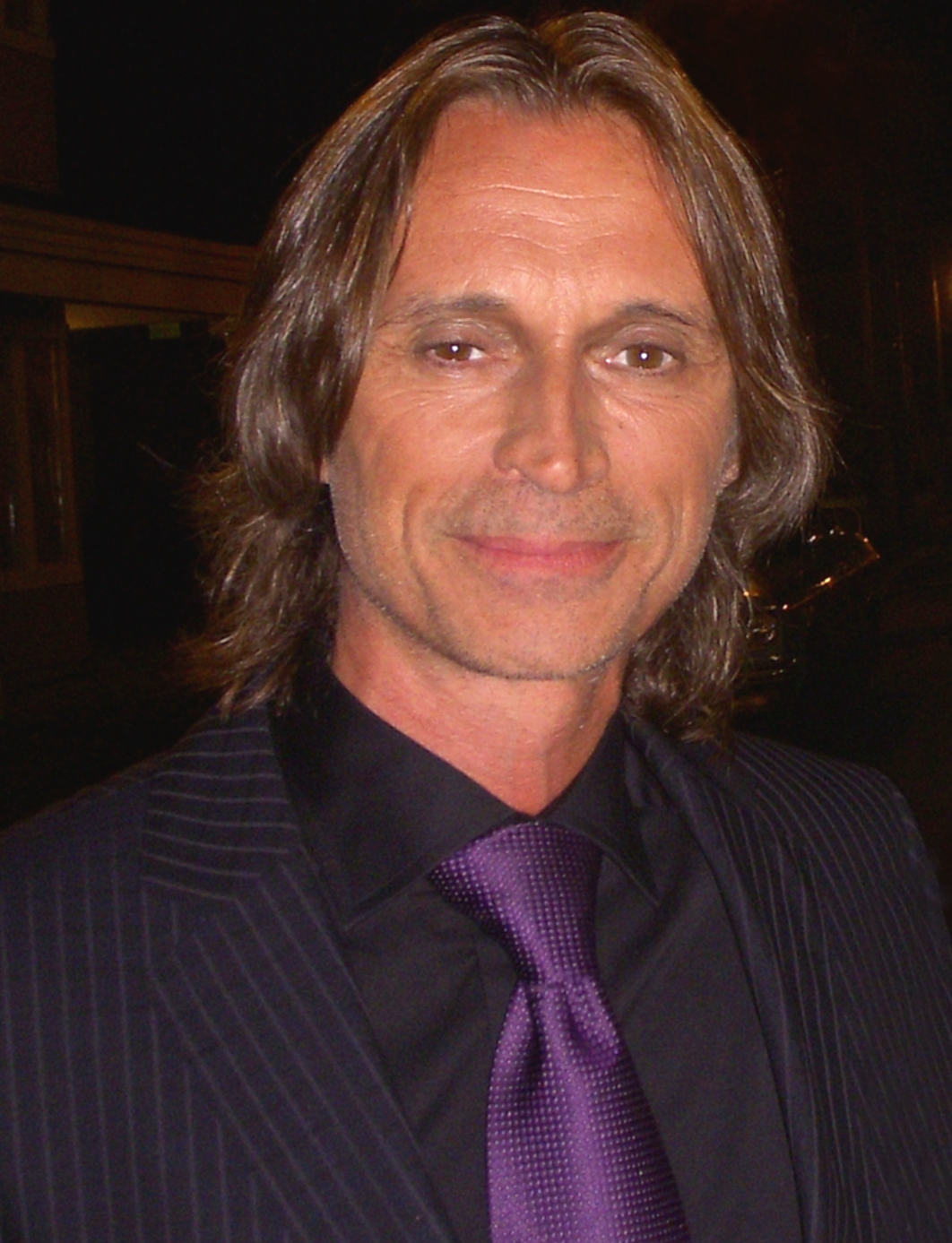
Robert Carlyle's performance was praised by critics.

"Desperate Souls" received mostly positive reviews from television critics.

In her first review of the series, Hillary Busis of Entertainment Weekly expressed her enjoyment of the episode, believing the following week would be "pretty difficult to top tonight's ep." Busis praised the final fairytale scenes as "intense, effective... [and]... awesome." IGN writer Amy Ratcliffe rated the episode 7/10, giving praise to Robert Carlyle and guest actor Brad Dourif, but criticizing Lana Parrilla's constant "dagger stares and pursed lips" to Emma. Ratcliffe did however believe Ginnifer Goodwin and Joshua Dallas had "electric chemistry," and wished viewers could see more scenes between the two. Like Ratcliffe, Digital Spy columnist Catriona Wightman lauded Parrilla and Carlyle's performances, believing the latter "continues to be one of the best things about Once Upon A Time - this completely new version of Rumpelstiltskin we saw was illuminating. Turns out he does cowardly and pathetic quite well."

The Huffington Post editor Laura Prudom and TV Fanatic's C. Orlando also highlighted Carlyle's acting and storyline. Prudom liked Dourif's casting, but singled out praise for Mary Margaret and David's poster scene, calling it "beautifully written and played, understated and filled with longing." The A.V. Club's Oliver Sava was more critical of the episode, and graded "Desperate Souls" with a C. He remarked that Once Upon a Time "lacks Lost's sophistication and insight, instead laying out plot in the plainest terms possible, no matter how tedious that may be... It hasn’t even been ten episodes, and the formula is already starting to feel stale." Despite this, Sava saw potential for the series, noting that "the writers just need to take fuller advantage of the wealth of mythology that the fairy tale stories give them."

== Cast ==
=== Starring ===
- Ginnifer Goodwin as Mary Margaret Blanchard
- Jennifer Morrison as Emma Swan
- Lana Parrilla as Regina Mills
- Josh Dallas as The "Prince"
- Jared S. Gilmore as Henry Mills
- Raphael Sbarge as Archie Hopper
- Robert Carlyle as Rumplestiltskin/Mr. Gold

=== Guest Starring ===
- Brad Dourif as Zoso/Old Beggar
- Giancarlo Esposito as Sidney Glass
- Beverley Elliott as Granny
- Ty Olsson as Hordor
- Meghan Ory as Ruby
- Dylan Schmid as Baelfire

=== Co-Starring ===
- Patti Allan as Miss Ginger
- Kate Bateman as Morraine's Mother
- Conner Dwelly as Morraine
- Mark Gash as Morraine's Father
- David-Paul Grove as Doc
- C. Ernst Harth as Burly Man
- Gabe Khouth as Mr. Clark

=== Uncredited ===
- Unknown as Floyd
