= Snow Falls (Once Upon a Time) =

- Once Upon a Time episode
- Episode no.: Season 1 Episode 3
- Directed by: Dean White
- Written by: Liz Tigelaar
- Original air date: November 6, 2011

Guest appearances
- David Anders as Dr. Whale; Lee Arenberg as Leroy; Anastasia Griffith as Abigail/Kathryn Nolan; Meghan Ory as Ruby

Episode chronology
← Previous "The Thing You Love Most"	Next → "The Price of Gold"
- Once Upon a Time season 1

"Snow Falls" is the third episode of the American fairy tale/drama television series Once Upon a Time. The series takes place in the fictional seaside town of Storybrooke, Maine, in which the residents are actually characters from various fairy tales that were transported to the "real world" town by a powerful curse. This episode centers on the first meeting of Snow White (Ginnifer Goodwin) and Prince Charming (Joshua Dallas), when the former steals his mother's ring; Charming hunts her down, but they later part amicably. Meanwhile, Snow's Storybrooke counterpart, Mary Margaret (Goodwin), develops a personal bond with a comatose John Doe (Dallas) while reading him fairy tales. During the night, he awakens and escapes the hospital; Mary Margaret locates the amnesiac man, but is dismayed to learn that he is married.

The episode was written by co-executive producer Liz Tigelaar, while being directed by Dean White. It featured the first appearance of David Anders as Dr. Whale and Anastasia Griffith in the dual role of Kathryn Nolan and Princess Abigail. "Snow Falls" serves as a prequel to the pilot episode. Goodwin injured herself during filming and received facial stitches in a local emergency room, though she and Dallas still called the episode their favorite up to that point. Starring cast members Raphael Sbarge and Robert Carlyle did not appear in the episode

It first aired in the United States on ABC on November 6, 2011. An estimated 11.4 million viewers tuned into the episode, and it placed second in its timeslot, though it garnered five percent fewer viewers than the previous episode. "Snow Falls" received generally positive reviews from television critics, with several calling it an indication that the series was improving over time. The chemistry between Goodwin and Dallas was particularly highlighted for praise. A novelization of the episode was released in 2013.

== Title card ==
A troll is in the forest.

== Plot ==
=== In the characters' past ===
In the Enchanted Forest, a guarded carriage carrying Prince Charming (Joshua Dallas) and his fiancee, Abigail (Anastasia Griffith), is halted by a roadblock. Charming notices a fallen tree is blocking the road, and that it was cut on purpose. The carriage is ambushed by a hooded vagabond, who takes Charming's bag of valuables, including a wedding ring. Charming pursues and knocks the mysterious thief off their horse. He discovers it is a woman, Snow White (Ginnifer Goodwin). Before he can get an answer as to why she stole his bag, Snow hits him with a rock, surprising and cutting him to make her escape. Charming vows that he will find her.

Later, Charming tracks Snow and nets her in a trap. Snow reluctantly agrees to show Charming where she sold his jewels. Along the way, Charming discovers a wanted poster of Snow in her bag. Snow claims the Evil Queen (Lana Parrilla) blames her for ruining her life. Charming asks if this is true and she admits it is.

As they reach a river, Snow once again tricks Charming and escapes again, only to be captured moments later by the Queen's henchmen. Their orders are to cut out Snow's heart and bring it to the Queen. Charming attacks the henchmen with his sword, killing two. One henchman gets away with Snow, and Charming quickly dispatches him with an arrow. Now that he has saved Snow, she decides to trust him, and agrees to lead him to the place where she sold the items.

They reach the dilapidated bridge where Snow sold Charming's goods to a group of trolls. When she asks the trolls if she can buy back the ring, the trolls become suspicious and discover the wanted poster of Snow, leading to a fight. Snow comes to Charming's rescue by using fairy dust to turn the trolls into bugs. Charming is surprised that Snow saved him, but she wants to repay him for saving her life. As she hands him back the items, including the wedding ring, Snow looks at the ring, then places it on her finger before handing it back to him as they go their separate ways.

=== In Storybrooke ===
In the present day, during a night out with Dr. Whale (David Anders), Mary Margaret (Goodwin) tries to make a little conversation with him; however, he is busy ogling Ruby (Meghan Ory), prompting Mary Margaret to leave the cafe by herself. As she walks back to her apartment, she notices Emma Swan (Jennifer Morrison) in her car reading a newspaper and searching for a place to stay. Mary Margaret offers Emma a spare room at her apartment. The following day, Mary Margaret notices Henry (Jared S. Gilmore) looking at the comatose John Doe (Dallas) while they are setting up decorations at the hospital. Henry believes that John Doe is Prince Charming and Mary Margaret is Snow White. Henry asks her to read to Charming from the storybook, convinced that it will wake him up. Emma persuades Mary Margaret to go along with Henry's wishes so that they can prove the stories aren't real. At the hospital, Mary Margaret reads the stories to the patient, until his hand grabs hers, shocking Mary Margaret. She tells Dr. Whale that Charming might be waking up, but the doctor does not believe her. After she leaves, Dr. Whale calls Regina (Parrilla), as he had been instructed to do should there be a change in John Doe's state, revealing that he had been lying to Mary Margaret.

The next day, Emma, Henry and Mary Margaret stop by the hospital to see him, only to discover that the patient has left on his own and might be bleeding. Regina and Sheriff Graham (Jamie Dornan) have also shown up, since Regina is the emergency contact for John Doe. She claims that she had found him on the side of the road unconscious without any memory of what or who he was. As Regina takes Henry home, Emma, Mary Margaret, and the sheriff decide to investigate what happened and visit the security room. They encounter the janitor Leroy (Lee Arenberg), and the security guard Walter, who was sleeping on the job (since he is actually Sleepy). Emma and the others discover that John Doe went out into the woods.

As Emma, Mary Margaret, and Graham search the wooded area for John Doe, they are joined by Henry. Henry believes that the patient is looking for Mary Margaret. They soon discover the patient lying near the bridge seen in the fairytale flashback, and Mary Margaret revives him. As they take him back to the hospital, Regina shows up with a woman named Kathryn (Griffith), and states that she is his wife and that the patient's name is David Nolan. This devastates Mary Margaret, as she had begun to develop feelings for the patient. Emma becomes suspicious of Regina's ability to find Nolan's wife and questions why Kathryn never bothered to search for him before. Although Regina claims that past hospital surveillance tapes had David mentioning Kathryn's name in his sleep, Emma still believes that Regina is lying. Later that evening, Emma arrives at Mary Margaret's place and agrees to take up the offer of staying with the teacher.

== Production ==
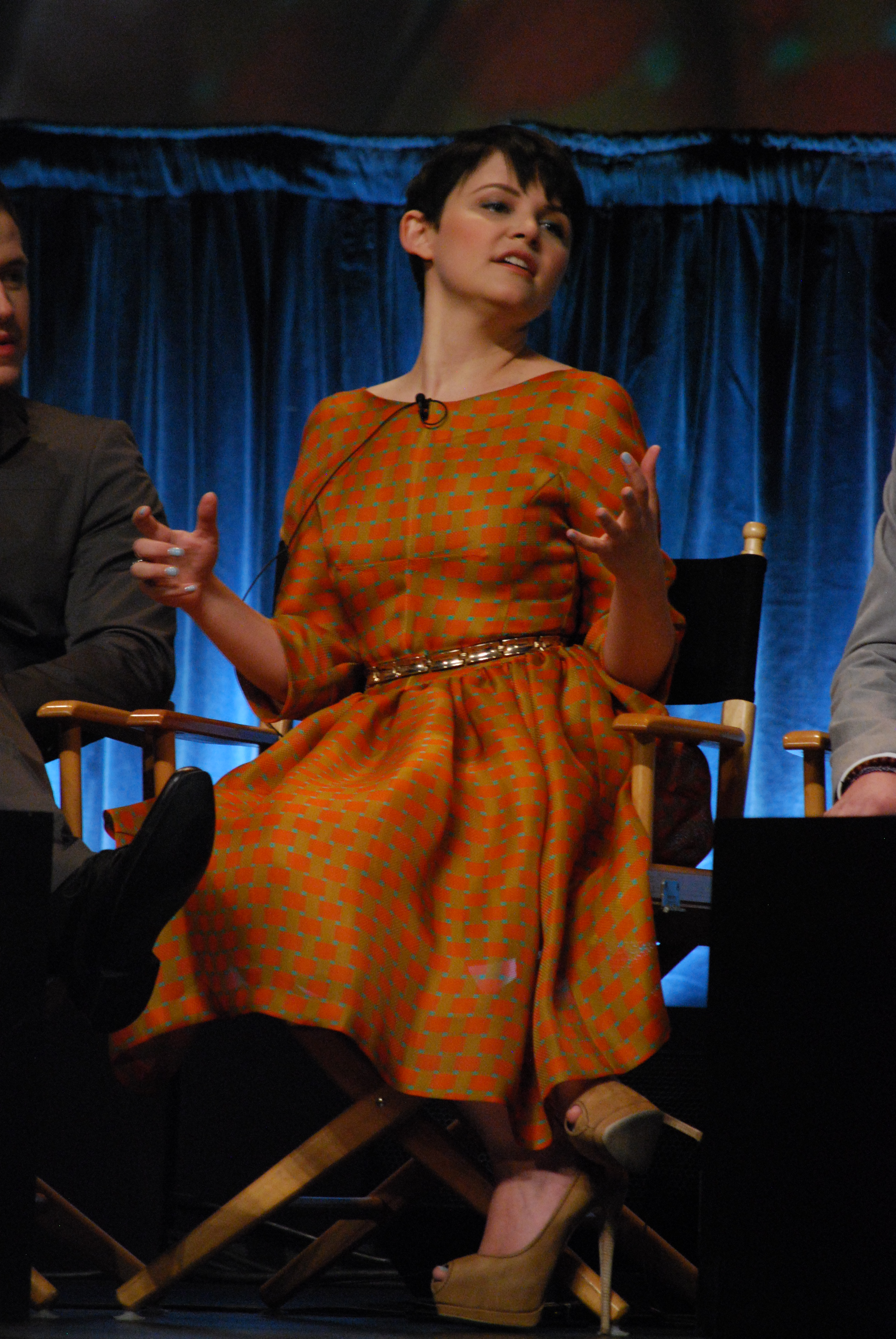
A horse injured Ginnifer Goodwin's hand and face during filming of the episode.

"Snow Falls" was written by co-executive producer Liz Tigelaar, while being directed by The Shield veteran Dean White. The episode features the first appearance of Anastasia Griffith as Abigail/Kathryn Nolan, a recurring role. Her casting was announced in early August 2011, with her character being variously described as "spoiled" and "regal". Actor David Anders also made his first appearance in this episode as Dr. Whale.

The episode serves as a prequel to the events of the pilot. In October 2011, Ginnifer Goodwin told reporters that she was excited to portray the beginning of Snow and Charming's relationship "because it is based more on animosity and manipulation and selfishness." She added that "they have a very far way to go from their moment of meeting to falling in love," making the episode "greatly challenging and fun."

In the scene in which Snow White is captured by The Queen's henchmen, Goodwin tweeted that the horse ran right into her, sending her flying and injuring her hand and face. Goodwin explained that "we go on quite an adventure and I came away with an actual, physical scar from it." The incident required that the actress' face receive stitches in a hospital emergency room. Goodwin and Joshua Dallas said that it was their favorite episode up to that point, with Dallas saying it was "lot of fun to shoot and it’s just great." In another tweet, Goodwin commented that Jennifer Morrison taught her to perform CPR during a scene with Dallas, as Morrison learned the procedure while she was a regular on House M.D.

The episode was included in Reawakened: A Once Upon a Time Tale – a novelization of the first season – which was written by Odette Beane and published by Hyperion Books in May 2013. The novel is intended to give "fans of the show a whole new look at their favorite characters and stories," and is alternately set from the perspective of Emma Swan and Snow White, who narrate events in Storybrooke and the Enchanted Forest, respectively.

== Reception ==
=== Ratings ===
"Snow Falls" first aired in the United States on November 6, 2011, earning strong ratings. It was watched by an estimated 11.4 million viewers, five percent less than the previous episode. It earned a ratings share of 3.7 among adults aged 18 to 49 and a 6.6 score among overall viewers. The episode ranked second in its timeslot behind Football Night In America on NBC but ahead of The Simpsons on the Fox network and The Amazing Race on CBS. In Canada, the episode was watched by an estimated 1.732 million viewers, a rise from the previous episode's 1.44 million. The show ranked 16th overall for the week.

=== Reviews ===
The episode was met with generally positive reviews.

Writing for Zap2it, Andrea Reiher stated that this episode was the best since the pilot, explaining that "if they continue to be this good, this show should be in for a long run." Reiher cited Goodwin's "wonderful, captivating" performance and the parallels between the Storybrooke and Enchanted Forest stories as particular highlights. In a review from TV Fanatic, writer Christine Orlando stated that the episode "had me on the edge of my seat and enjoying the ride," giving particular praise to Snow and Charming's chemistry-filled early relationship. Orlando concluded, "Snow White, the character I had the least interest in two weeks ago, held her own and then some. Heck, I was so enthralled by her story that, for the first time ever, I can't wait to learn more." Sound on Sight's Ricky D thought it wise that the episode focused on Snow and Charming, "without feeling the need to include multiple stories." He felt that Goodwin had "excellent" chemistry with Dallas and that her performance saved the "silliness of the modern day plot," especially in her developing relationship with Emma.

IGN's Amy Ratcliffe gave "Snow Falls" a score of 8 out of 10 and felt that while "everyone delivered solid performances... Goodwin stole the show" for playing a character who was "not an innocent, doe-eyed girl." Like Orlando, Ratcliffe also felt that "Goodwin and Dallas hit a perfect rhythm every time they share the screen," but expressed concern about how the series would continue cutting between both worlds. Shaunna Murphy of Entertainment Weekly cited "Snow Falls" as evidence that the show was continuing down the "fortunate path of getting better each week." Murphy was interested in Sheriff Graham, speculating that he might be the Huntsman from Snow White, which would be a "good, complicated role for him." The A.V. Club reviewer Oliver Sava was less positive, giving the episode a grade of C−. He was pleased the plot moved forward, but felt the execution did not work; he cited the "major problems" of "the lack of any sort of subtlety, nonsensical story developments, and Henry." Sava derided the "corny dialogue" and use of flashbacks, but wrote that the "best thing" about the episode was the introduction of Dr. Whale and Kathryn Nolan, and also praised the acting.

== Cast ==
=== Starring ===
- Ginnifer Goodwin as Snow White/Mary Margaret Blanchard
- Jennifer Morrison as Emma Swan
- Lana Parrilla as Evil Queen
- Josh Dallas as Prince Charming/Unconscious Man
- Jared S. Gilmore as Henry Mills
- Raphael Sbarge (credit only)
- Jamie Dornan as Sheriff Graham
- Robert Carlyle (credit only)

=== Guest Starring ===
- David Anders as Dr. Whale
- Lee Arenberg as Leroy
- Anastasia Griffith as Abigail/Kathryn Nolan
- Meghan Ory as Ruby

=== Co-Starring ===
- Faustino di Bauda as Walter
- Mark Gibbon as Head Troll
- Amos Stern as Lead Knight
- Lucas Wolf as Armed Escort

=== Uncredited ===
- Unknown as Floyd
