= Fruit of the Poisonous Tree (Once Upon a Time) =

- Once Upon a Time episode
- Episode no.: Season 1 Episode 11
- Directed by: Bryan Spicer
- Written by: Ian B. Goldberg; Andrew Chambliss
- Original air date: January 29, 2012

Guest appearances
- Eion Bailey as The Stranger; Giancarlo Esposito as Genie/The Magic Mirror/Sidney Glass; Tony Perez as Henry; Richard Schiff as King Leopold

Episode chronology
← Previous "7:15 A.M."	Next → "Skin Deep"
- Once Upon a Time season 1

"Fruit of the Poisonous Tree" is the 11th episode of the American fairy tale/drama television series Once Upon a Time, which aired in the United States on ABC on January 29, 2012.

The series takes place in the fictional seaside town of Storybrooke, Maine, in which the residents are actually characters from various fairy tales that were transported to the "real world" town by a powerful curse. In this episode, Emma Swan (Jennifer Morrison) is asked by Sidney Glass (Giancarlo Esposito) for help uncovering evidence that could expose Regina's (Lana Parrilla) corrupt ways in Storybrooke, while in the Enchanted Forest, Snow White's (Ginnifer Goodwin) father King Leopold (Richard Schiff) is granted three wishes by a Genie (Esposito), which details the back story of the Magic Mirror's origins.

It was co-written by Andrew Chambliss and Ian B. Goldberg and directed by Bryan Spicer.

== Title card ==
The Genie of the Lamp appears in the Enchanted Forest.

== Plot ==
=== In the characters' past ===
In The Enchanted Forest, King Leopold (Richard Schiff) finds a lamp and releases the Genie (Giancarlo Esposito) living inside, who grants the King three wishes. Having nothing more that he could want, the King uses his first wish to free the Genie and then uses his second wish to give away his third wish to the Genie. The King brings the Genie back to his castle and introduces him to Snow (Ginnifer Goodwin) and the Queen (Lana Parrilla). When the Genie meets the latter, he is enamored. At his birthday party, the King declares Snow the greatest gift and the fairest in the land. The Queen departs, feeling rejected, but the Genie follows her out and gives her a mirror which lets her see herself as he sees her; as the fairest of all. The King finds the mirror and the Queen's diary revealing feelings for the man who gave it to her. He commands the Genie to find this man who has stolen the Queen's heart. As the Genie wonders what to do, the Queen's father, Henry (Tony Perez), shows up and gives him a box. Henry claims the contents will free his daughter. The Genie brings the box to his beloved Queen and they find deadly snakes from the Genie's home country. The Queen wants to free herself from her loveless marriage by suicide via the snake's venom. The Genie stops her and offers an alternative, a plot to kill the King. He sets the snakes upon the King in his bed which startles him awake. As the venom takes hold, the Genie confesses to giving the Queen the mirror as a token of his love and begs forgiveness. The King responds by saying that the Genie was right, he should have never made a wish. Then, the Genie informs the Queen her husband is dead and they can be together at last. The Queen reveals it was her plan all along to have the Genie kill the King, even using snakes that would be traced to him. The Genie, stung by this betrayal, uses his wish: to stay at the Queen's side and look upon her face always. He finds himself trapped in the mirror, becoming the Magic Mirror. The Queen notes that he did get his wish.

=== In Storybrooke ===
In Storybrooke, the storm from the previous episode has wrecked Henry's (Jared S. Gilmore) castle so he checks the sand underneath to be sure his book is still there. He tells Emma Swan (Jennifer Morrison) it's their secret, but Regina Mills (Parrilla) finds him and plans to clear the castle away on the ground that it is a safety hazard. At Granny's, Sidney Glass (Esposito) approaches Emma to tell her Regina fired him from the paper and embezzled $50,000 of town funds. He needs her help to expose the mayor's corruption. When Henry discovers his book is missing after the castle is torn down, Emma agrees to help. Sidney and Emma follow Regina into the woods but Emma loses control when her brakes fail. They run into Mr. Gold (Robert Carlyle) who admits to selling Regina a plot of land. Emma and Sidney break into the mayor's house to find out what the land is for and they discover a plan for a building. Sidney also finds photos of Henry with Emma, concluding Regina had her followed. At a city council meeting, Emma shows the files to the whole town and accuses Regina of building a second home in the woods. Regina, unfazed, unveils her plans to build a new playground for Henry and all the children in Storybrooke. She goes on to warn Emma that if she continues to see Henry, she will file a restraining order. A victorious Regina congratulates her accomplice, Sidney, for convincing Emma he is an ally and for cutting her brakes. She tells Sidney she doesn't know what she'd do without him. After his book is lost in the tear down, Henry sits at Granny's and tries to write the stories down so he doesn't forget. The Stranger (Eion Bailey) questions him about what he's doing and Henry asks the same question back. Henry does not realize it is the Stranger who has his book.

== Production ==
"Fruit of the Poisonous Tree" was co-written by co-producers Ian B. Goldberg and Andrew Chambliss, while 24 veteran, Bryan Spicer, directed the installment.

== Cultural references ==
The episode contains a reference to the collection of short stories, One Thousand and One Nights, with the line, "In my time I have granted a thousand and one wishes and I have seen them end poorly a thousand and one times."

== Reception ==
=== Ratings ===
This episode saw an increase from the previous episode, scoring a 3.5/9 among 18-49s and a 5.9/10 overall, with 10.91 million viewers tuning in. It was also the most watched episode in eleven weeks. In Canada, the episode finished in ninth place for the week with an estimated 1.58 million viewers.

=== Reviews ===
Reviews for the episode were mixed.

Oliver Sava of The A.V. Club gave it a B, noting, "What sets this episode apart from the last 10 is that we finally get some real emotion and motivation from Regina. For someone that doesn’t want to be thought of as a villain, Regina is a raging bitch all of the time, but we finally see her softer side come out in the fairyback in an instance that isn’t patricide." He also praised recurring actor Giancarlo Esposito's performance, noting "Anyone who has watched the last three seasons of Breaking Bad knows what a remarkable actor Giancarlo Esposito is, so it’s not that big of a surprise that his first spotlight episode of Once Upon A Time is a highlight of the series."

IGN columnist Amy Ratcliffe reviewed the episode far less favourably, rating it a "mediocre" 5/10 and noting that "the idea that the genie fell for another man's wife and tragically became the Mirror had a lot of potential, but was torpedoed by a script that was going through the motions." Laura Prudom of The Huffington Post felt that her "main problem with this episode was that, by the end, we were right back to where we started narratively, with nothing having truly developed," a sentiment shared by Ratcliffe.

== Cast ==
=== Starring ===
- Ginnifer Goodwin as Snow White/Mary Margaret Blanchard
- Jennifer Morrison as Emma Swan
- Lana Parrilla as Evil Regina/Regina Mills
- Josh Dallas as Prince Charming/David Nolan
- Jared S. Gilmore as Henry Mills
- Raphael Sbarge (credit only)
- Robert Carlyle as Mr. Gold

=== Guest Starring ===
- Eion Bailey as Stranger
- Giancarlo Esposito as Magic Mirror/Sidney Glass/Genie
- Tony Perez as Prince Henry
- Richard Schiff as King Leopold

=== Uncredited ===
- Unknown as Floyd
