= Liz Tigelaar =

American writer

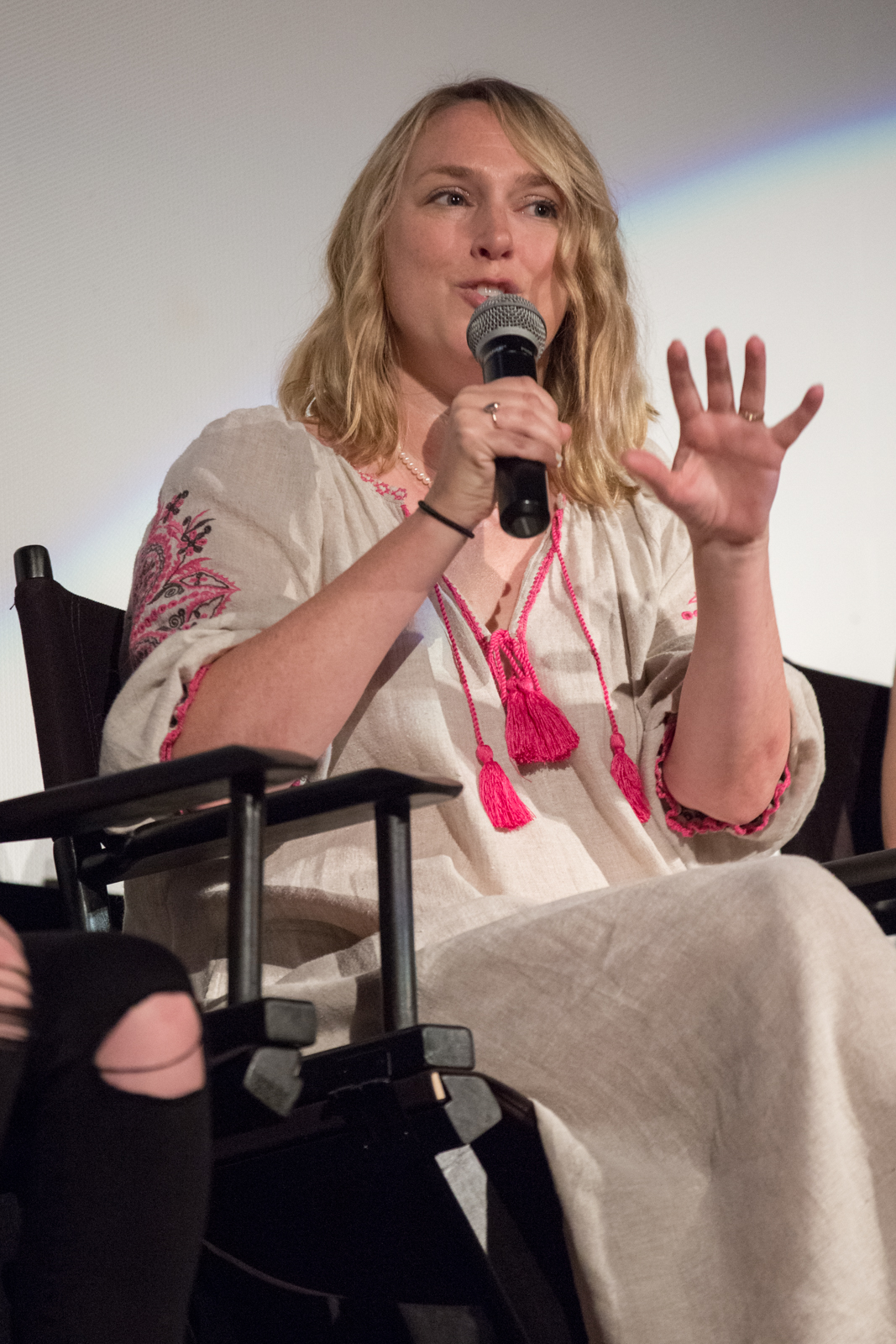
- Tigelaar in 2016
- Born: October 4, 1975 (age 51); Washington, D.C., U.S.
- Education: Ithaca College
- Occupations: Television producer; writer; author
- Years active: 2000–present

Rachel Elizabeth Tigelaar (born October 4, 1975) is an American television writer, producer, and author.

She has worked on the series Brothers & Sisters, American Dreams, Once and Again, Once Upon a Time, Revenge, Bates Motel, Casual and is well known for creating and executive producing The CW series Life Unexpected.

== Early life ==
Tigelaar was born in Washington, D.C.. She was adopted as a child, something that influenced her work on Life Unexpected. She grew up in Dallas, Texas, and Guilford, Connecticut, and graduated from Ithaca College with a degree in scriptwriting and politics.

== Career ==
=== 2000–06: Early writing ===
Tigelaar, in 2000, was an assistant on the series Dawson's Creek and co-wrote her first episode with Holly Henderson, the third-season episode, "Show Me Love". Tigelaar also co-wrote with Holly Henderson two novels in the Dawson's Creek Suspense Trilogy, a series of novels based on the characters from the television series.

From 2001 to 2002, Tigelaar was an assistant to executive producer on the series Once and Again. Tigelaar became a writer for the series, American Dreams in 2002 and wrote two books based on the series in 2004. Tigelaar also wrote three episodes of the animated television series Totally Spies! from 2001 to 2002.

=== 2006–08: Continued writing, Stick It and PrettyTOUGH novels ===
Tigelaar was an associate producer on the 2006 comedy-drama film, Stick It, about gymnasts.

Tigelaar released her first novel as a solo writer in 2007 titled, PrettyTOUGH, a novel about two very different sisters, Krista and Charlie Brown, who have to face their differences and learn to work together when they are recruited for their high school soccer team. Tigelaar released a follow-up to the first novel titled, Playing with the Boys: A PrettyTOUGH Novel in 2008.

During this time, Tigelaar wrote for many shows including, Kyle XY, What About Brian, Side Order of Life, Brothers & Sisters and Dirty Sexy Money.

=== 2009–11: Life Unexpected ===
In January 2009, it was announced that Tigelaar was developing a new drama series under the title, Light Years for The CW. According to Tigelaar, the title "tested way too sci-fi" and it was changed to LUX (the name of the shows lead character) in April. On May 22, 2009, The CW announced they had picked up the new series from Tigelaar, with shows name changed again and this time under the name Parental Discretion Advised. In June 2009, the network reverted to the name Life UneXpected, again highlighting the name of the main character in capital letters. Initial advertising for the series in fall 2009 listed it without the capitalized "X", which became the final version.

The series tells the story of teenager Lux, who had been through the foster care system for almost her whole life and decides on her 16th birthday, to become an emancipated minor, but before that occurs, she has to get signatures from her unknown birth parents. When a judge decides that Lux isn't ready for emancipation, Lux is unexpectedly granted temporary joint custody to her birth parents, Baze and Cate.

Life Unexpected premiered on The CW on January 18, 2010. The first season's 13-episode run ended on April 12, 2010. The series was picked up for a second season, which premiered on September 14, 2010. The CW declined to order more episodes for the show's second season, leaving the season's episode count at 13. On December 6, 2010, Tigelaar made the series cancellation official via Facebook. The series aired its last episode on January 18, 2011.

Tigelaar has received much praise for her work on Life Unexpected. A review in the Los Angeles Times called Tigelaar's writing smart and insightful. Similarly, Randee Dawn, from The Hollywood Reporter stated that Tigelaar "has a delicate, spot-on feel for dialogue." The Futon Critic's Brian Ford Sullivan singled out Tigelaar, as well as director Gary Fleder, in Life Unexpected for adeptly exploring Lux's perceived lack of love in her life.

Tigelaar was also a consulting producer on the 2009 series of Melrose Place, an updated version of the 1990s Fox prime time drama of the same name and wrote the series' second episode, "Nightingale".

In 2010, the first novel of Tigelaar's book series, PrettyTOUGH, was developed into a webseries by Vuguru.

=== 2011–present: ABC Studios deal and The Joneses ===
==== The Joneses ====
In June 2011, Tigelaar began a development deal with ABC Studios and stated that she already had some things in mind. It was announced on August 19, 2011, that Tigelaar was reteaming with former Life Unexpected executive producers Gary Fleder and Mary Beth Basile on The Joneses, a drama series in development for ABC. It is based on the 2009 film of the same name that originally starred Demi Moore and David Duchovny.

In July 2012, after ABC had passed on the project, it was reported that cable channel Bravo had picked the series up to development.

==== Once Upon a Time ====
In May 2011, Tigelaar joined the crew of the ABC fantasy series Once Upon a Time, as a writer and co-executive producer. She departed the show to pursue greater involvement on Revenge. Episodes she contributed to included:

- "Snow Falls" 01.03
- "True North" 01.09 (co-written by co-executive producer David H. Goodman)

==== Revenge ====
In fall 2011, Tigelaar signed on to the ABC drama series Revenge as a writer and consulting producer. After the completion of the first season, Tigelaar left the show. Episodes she contributed to included:

- "Commitment" 01.13 (co-written with co-executive producer Mark B. Perry)
- "Justice" 01.18 (co-written with executive story editor Sallie Patrick)

==== Nashville ====
In summer 2012, Tigelaar joined the first season of the ABC musical/drama Nashville, as a writer.

==== Little Fires Everywhere ====
She served as developer and showrunner on the miniseries Little Fires Everywhere that was released by Hulu in March 2020 and produced by ABC Signature.

=== Future projects ===
In 2026, she moved to Paramount Television Studios and CBS Studios in an overall deal.
