= Seven Dwarfs =

Fictional characters in the fairy tale "Snow White"

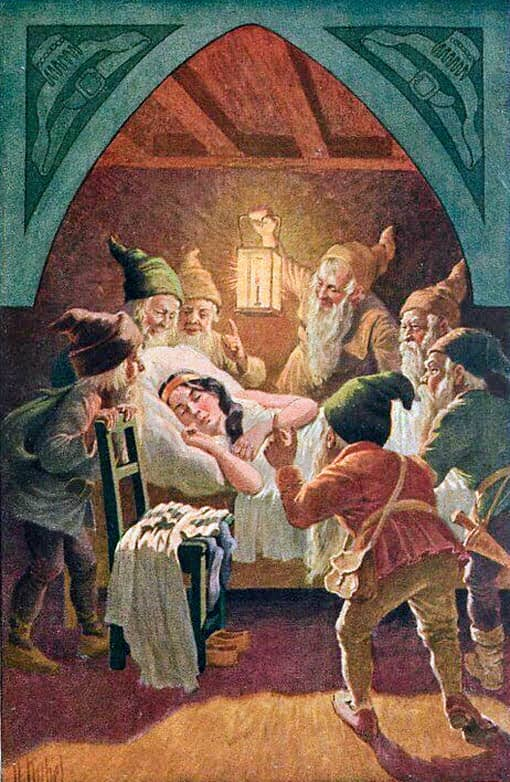
1930 illustration by Otto Kubel depicting the Seven Dwarfs finding Snow White asleep

The Seven Dwarfs are fictional dwarfs in the 1812 fairy tale "Snow White" by the Brothers Grimm and other renditions and adaptations.

== History ==
The Seven Dwarfs live in a tiny cottage and work in the nearby mines. Snow White stumbles upon their house after being told by the Huntsman to flee from the Queen's kingdom.

The Seven Dwarfs return home and immediately notice someone has sneaked in, because the house has been cleaned. During their loud discussion, they discover the sleeping Snow White. She wakes up and explains to them what happened. The Dwarfs take pity on her, saying: "If you will keep house for us, and cook, make the beds, wash, sew, and knit, and keep everything clean and orderly, then you can stay with us, and you shall have everything that you want." They warn her to be careful when alone at home, and to not let anyone in while they are working in the mountains.

When the Queen, disguised as an old peddler woman, ties a colorful silk bodice onto Snow White, it causes her to faint. The Seven Dwarfs return just in time and Snow White is saved when the Dwarfs cut the lace.

The Queen comes once again, this time dressed as a comb seller. She gives Snow White a poisoned comb, but the Seven Dwarfs save her again.

The Queen then appears disguised as a farmer's wife and gives Snow White a poisoned apple. Snow White bites into it and falls to the ground, apparently dead. This time, the Seven Dwarfs are unable to revive the girl, because they cannot determine Snow White's physical state and, assuming that she is dead, place her in a glass coffin. After some time, a Prince traveling through the land sees Snow White. He walks up to her coffin and, enchanted by her beauty, instantly falls in love with her. As the Prince transports her body back to his castle, her coffin is hit hard and a large piece of apple in her throat is dislodged, thus reviving her. The prince then marries Snow White and they "live happily ever after."

== Appearances in modern media ==
=== Disney Dwarfs ===
The Seven Disney Dwarfs
- Snow White and the Seven Dwarfs characters
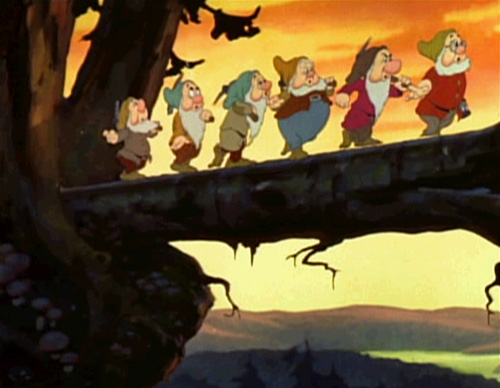
- Six out of the seven Disney dwarfs (left to right: Sneezy, Bashful, Sleepy, Happy, Grumpy, Doc) – all but Dopey, who is just off-screen – walking on a log and singing "Heigh-Ho"
- First appearance: Snow White and the Seven Dwarfs; December 21, 1937
- Created by: Walt Disney; Fred Moore; Bill Tytla; Ward Kimball; Frank Thomas; Les Clark

In-universe information
- Species: Human
- Gender: Male

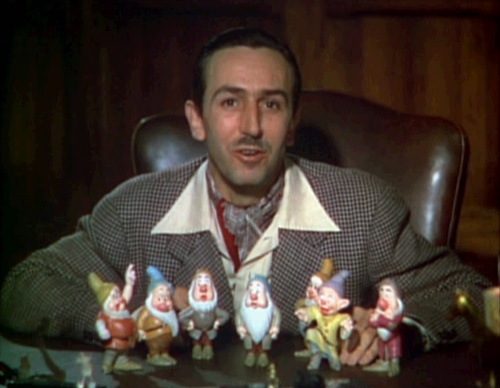
Walt Disney introducing his design of the dwarfs in the trailer of Snow White and the Seven Dwarfs

A Disney version of the Seven Dwarfs appeared in the 1937 animated film Snow White and the Seven Dwarfs:

- Doc (voiced by Roy Atwell in the film, Jim Cummings and André Sogliuzzo in later projects, and Bill Farmer in The Lion King 1½) – The leader of the seven dwarfs, Doc wears glasses and often mixes up his words.
- Grumpy (voiced by Pinto Colvig in the film, Corey Burton in later projects, Dan Castellaneta in Plusaversary, and Josh Robert Thompson on Once Upon a Studio) – Grumpy initially opposes Snow White's presence in the dwarfs' home, but later warns her of the threat posed by the Queen and eagerly rushes to her aid upon realizing that she is in danger, leading the charge himself. He has the biggest nose of the dwarfs, and is frequently seen with one eye shut or with a frown until the film's finale.
- Happy (voiced by Otis Harlan in the film, Kevin Schon and Stephen Stanton in later projects, and Dan Castellaneta in Plusaversary) – Happy is the jovial dwarf and is usually portrayed laughing. While the other dwarfs have thin black eyebrows inspired by Walt Disney's eyebrows, his eyebrows are white and thicker.
- Sleepy (voiced by Pinto Colvig in the film, Bill Farmer in later projects) – Sleepy is always tired and appears lethargic in most situations.
- Bashful (voiced by Scotty Mattraw in the film, Jeff Bennett in later projects) – Bashful is very shy and kind-hearted. He is also described as cute and romantic, with a crush on Snow White. He often blushes when embarrassed or at the center of attention.
- Sneezy (voiced by Billy Gilbert in the film, Bob Joles in later projects) – Sneezy's name is earned by his extraordinarily powerful sneezes (caused by hay fever), which are seen blowing even the heaviest of objects across a room.
- Dopey (vocal effects provided by Eddie Collins in the film) – Dopey is the youngest dwarf, being the only one who does not have a beard and is bald, with the largest ears of the dwarfs. He is accident-prone and mute, with Happy explaining that he has simply "never tried" to speak. Furthermore, he shares his name with another Disney character, one of the Dumbo crow characters, "Dopey", also known as "Straw Hat".

The Seven Dwarfs also appeared in other animated projects like Seven Wise Dwarfs, All Together, The Winged Scourge, House of Mouse, The Lion King 1½, and Once Upon a Studio. They also appear in video games like Kingdom Hearts Birth by Sleep and its prequel Kingdom Hearts χ, and Disney Magic Kingdoms.

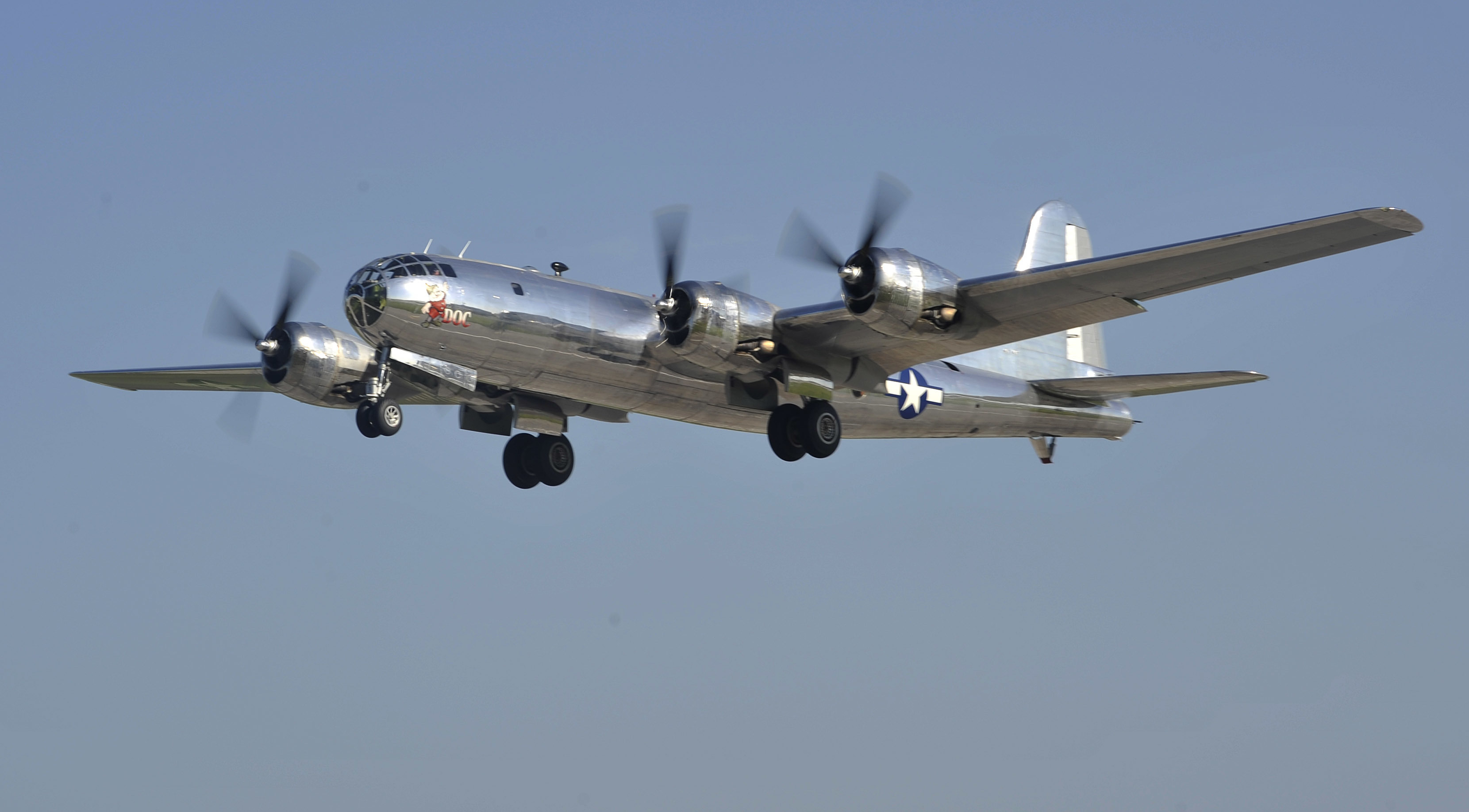
Built during World War II, Doc, a Boeing B-29 Superfortress, was named after one of the Seven Disney Dwarfs.

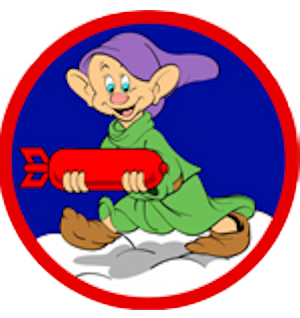
Dopey on the emblem for the 341st Bombardment Squadron during World War II

In the early 2000s, DisneyToon Studios (DTS) joined Disney Consumer Products (DCP) as their internal Disney conglomerate video partner in developing the new Disney franchises. While DCP eyed other potential franchises, DisneyToon looked to the Seven Dwarfs for a male-centric franchise to counterbalance the female-centric Disney Fairies. By 2005, The Seven Dwarfs animated sequel to Snow White was officially underway. Paul and Gaëtan Brizzi was one team that was given an attempt at a movie pitch, which was to follow the Dwarfs in which they trap the villain in the magic mirror and setting it up for Snow White movie. Given the possible demand, Buena Vista Games brought in Obsidian Entertainment, a game developer, who pitched a video game focusing on the Dwarfs' similar ancestors. DTS executives were not feeling that the two franchise launching projects were coming together well enough that they turned to Mike Disa, who worked on the Tinker Bell story. Disa and Evan Spiliotopoulos pitched a The Lord of the Rings-style epic for the dwarfs while "connecting seamlessly" with the original film, which was given permission to move forward. With interfering managers wanting a tragic back story for Dopey, Disa decided that he could not go forward. Walt Disney Animation Studios chief creative officer John Lasseter about two month later ended production on the film.

The 7D is an American animated television series produced by Disney Television Animation based on Snow White and the Seven Dwarfs. It is a re-imagining of the title characters from the 1937 film and their adventures prior to the introduction of Snow White. The TV series details the 7D working for Queen Delightful where they protect Jollywood from the Glooms and other threats. For this version of the characters, Doc is voiced by Bill Farmer (reprising his role from The Lion King 1½), Grumpy is voiced by Maurice LaMarche, Happy is voiced by Kevin Michael Richardson, Sleepy is voiced by Stephen Stanton, Bashful is voiced by Billy West, and Sneezy is voiced by Scott Menville while Dopey's vocal effects are provided by Dee Bradley Baker.

The Seven Dwarfs were given a new theme park attraction called the Seven Dwarfs Mine Train coaster.

In the original Descendants trilogy, Dopey is shown to have a son named Doug (portrayed by Zachary Gibson) who can talk and becomes smitten by Evil Queen's daughter Evie. In the first Descendants novel The Isle of the Lost, Doc is shown to be sympathetic towards the Goblins that operate on the Isle of the Lost's Goblin Wharf where they want amnesty for their involvement with Maleficent. In the books and short series School of Secrets, the other six dwarfs also have sons, and Happy is mentioned to have one in Descendants 2 who's his opposite (Doug says he's kind of a dark streak).

Grumpy makes a cameo appearance in the 2018 film Ralph Breaks the Internet, where he yelled at Vanellope for entering the Oh My Disney's cast members-only area.

Sneezy is among the bootlegged toons in the 2022 live-action/animated film adaptation of Chip 'n Dale: Rescue Rangers.

The guns of the British battleship HMS Nelson, officially known as "Right, Centre or Left" gun in "A", "B" or "X" turret, were unofficially named by the crew, "Mickey", "Minnie", "Grumpy", "Sneezy", "Dopey", "Bashful", "Happy", "Sleepy" and "Doc".

In the 2023 Disney film Wish, the main character Asha's seven friends are inspired by the seven dwarfs, both in personality and in sharing the initial of their names: Dahlia (Doc), Gabo (Grumpy), Hal (Happy), Simon (Sleepy), Safi (Sneezy), Bazeema (Bashful), and Dario (Dopey).

In the 2025 live-action adaptation of the original film, the Seven Dwarfs appear in CGI form and are performed through a combination of motion-capture, puppetry, and voice-acting with Doc being motion-captured/performed by Jonathan Bourne and voiced by Jeremy Swift, Grumpy being motion-captured/performed by Omari Bernard and voiced by Martin Klebba, Happy being motion-captured/performed by David Birch and voiced by George Salazar, Sleepy being motion-captured/performed by Sandy Foster and voiced by Andy Grotelueschen, Bashful being motion-captured/performed by Leah Haile and voiced by Tituss Burgess, Sneezy being motion-captured/performed by Dominic Owen and voiced by Jason Kravits, and Dopey being motion-captured/performed by Jaih Betote and voiced by Andrew Barth Feldman. In this film, the Seven Dwarfs are reimagined as "seven magical creatures" instead as The Walt Disney Company did not want to reinforce any stereotypes associated with the original film as they were also not referred to as the Seven Dwarfs in promotional material. In addition, all of them have a full head of hair. Unlike the original film after Snow White was freed from the Sleeping Death, the seven magical creatures join Snow White and Jonathan's bandits in preparing to confront the Evil Queen as Dopey finally speaks for the first time. The seven magical creatures and Jonathan's bandits join Snow White in confronting the Evil Queen as the Huntsman, the royal guards, and the rest of the kingdom side with Snow White. The end of the film revealed that Dopey was the narrator. The seven magical creatures later celebrate Snow White becoming the new queen of the kingdom. This reimagining was heavily criticized and ridiculed, earning the Seven Dwarfs two Golden Raspberry Awards, Worst Supporting Actor and Worst Screen Combo.

=== Sesame Street ===
In Sesame Street, there were different versions of the Seven Dwarfs where each of them was made from Anything Muppets.

- The Six Dwarfs seen in episode 279 consisted of Sparky (performed by Jerry Nelson), Snooky (performed by Jerry Nelson), Pokey (performed by Jim Henson), Flakey (performed by Jim Henson), Drippy (performed by Jerry Nelson), and Sneaky (performed by Jim Henson). Snow White visited their house instead of the Seven Dwarf by mistake and was able to see the difference.
- In a Sesame Street News Flash that was seen in episode 2787, the Seven Emotional Dwarfs appear where they were interviewed by Kermit the Frog. Their names are Cheerful (performed by Richard Hunt), Sad (performed by Kevin Clash), Angry (performed by Jerry Nelson), Proud (performed by Martin P. Robinson), Fearful (performed by David Rudman), Lovey (performed by James Kroupa), and Surprised (performed by Jim Martin).
- In episode 4114, the Seven Dwarfs appear opposite Snow White (portrayed by Amy Sedaris). The Seven Dwarfs consist of Clumsy (performed by Joey Mazzarino), Vertigo (performed by Fran Brill), Gassy (performed by Matt Vogel), Itchy (performed by Carmen Osbahr), Smelly (performed by Martin P. Robinson), Sensitive-Nose (performed by Ryan Dillon), and Hammy (performed by Eric Jacobson).

=== The Goodies ===
In the first episode of the final series of The Goodies (which was filmed at ITV), The Goodies did a story set in a fairy tale world where they replaced three of the Seven Dwarfs (two of them died of exposure and another one was eaten by a gold fish). But they are later found out because of their height. The dwarfs take their names from the Disney film (Sleepy, Happy, and Grumpy) while Graeme and Bill renamed themselves to fit in (Soppy and Gwotty). Only Tim kept his name.

=== Grimm's Fairy Tale Classics ===
In the "Snow White" episode of Grimm's Fairy Tale Classics, the Seven Dwarfs are named Sunday (voiced by Clifton Wells in the English dub), Monday (voiced by Kerrigan Mahan in the English dub), Tuesday, Wednesday (voiced by Tom Wyner in the English dub), Thursday, Friday (voiced by Michael Sorich in the English dub), and Saturday (voiced by Edward Mannix in the English dub) and are shown to be allied with a pack of wolves.

=== Snow White (1990) ===
The Seven Dwarves appear in the 1990 Snow White film voiced by Jim Cummings and Rob Paulsen.

=== Happily Ever After ===
In Happily Ever After, it was mentioned that the Seven Dwarfs have opened up a mine in the next kingdom. In their place is the Seven Dwarfelles (their female cousins) who have received a power based on nature to help out their boss Mother Nature.

The Dwarfelles consisted of:

- Muddy (voiced by Carol Channing) – A Dwarfelle who has power over the earth, and as such performs such tricks as causing minor tremors and such. She feels most comfortable playing in the mud.
- Sunburn (voiced by Sally Kellerman) – A Dwarfelle who has power over sunlight, and is able to focus sun rays in any area and to whatever extremity she so wishes. She uses her power in the film to clear away clouds and summon down a beam of light to illuminate a dark cave. She has a New Yorker accent and attitude and her catchphrase is "This really BURNS me up!".
- Blossom (voiced by Zsa Zsa Gabor) – A Dwarfelle who has power over plants and flowers, and is seen throughout the animation zapping the ground and having flowers spring up. It becomes apparent that her flora powers are less effective if the area is less natural or adaptable, as in the Realm of Doom. Blossom is very reminiscent of her voice actress with Gabor's mannerisms, penchant for the beautiful and fashionable, and even her signature accent.
- Marina (voiced by Linda Gary) – A Dwarfelle who has power over all lakes and rivers, but the only example of her powers in the film is being able to breathe underwater. Marina carries herself as a gentlewoman and has a British accent.
- Critterina (voiced by Linda Gary) – A Dwarfelle who has power of all animals who are created by Mother Nature. She is able to communicate with all animals, regardless of their creators, but does not have control over animals who are not Mother Nature's work like Lord Maliss' one-horned wolves. Although the other Dwarfelles are human in appearance, Critterina looks anthropomorphic. She aptly has a cowgirl mentality and a Texan accent.
- Moonbeam (voiced by Tracey Ullman) – A Dwarfelle is never seen using her powers, but has the distinct characteristic of being in a deep slumber and sleepwalking in the day, and only awaking at night.
- Thunderella (voiced by Tracey Ullman) – The seventh and youngest Dwarfelle, and is considered the "black sheep" of the seven because of her inability to control her powers. She has power over weather, and always seems to mess her attempts at creating storms. She ends up saving the day by hitting Lord Maliss with a bolt of lightning she creates from her fingertip.

The Dwarfelles helped Snow White on her quest to rescue the Prince from the Queen's sorcerer brother Lord Maliss.

=== Happily Ever After: Fairy Tales for Every Child ===
In Happily Ever After: Fairy Tales for Every Child, the show's adaptation of "Snow White" that takes place in the American southwest depicts the Seven Dwarves as seven mystical little men who came from the north to mine turquoise. They consist of:

- Bright Silver (voiced by Pato Hoffmann) – The leader of the seven little men.
- Fool's Gold (voiced by Burr DeBenning) – The clumsiest little man.
- Smelly Sulfur (voiced by Burr DeBenning) – The smelliest little man.
- Hard Jade (voiced by Tim Sampson) – The strongest little man.
- Rough Copper (voiced by Jim Great Elk Waters) – Named for his temper, but is also quick-witted.
- Sharp Flint (voiced by Michael Horse) – Named for his sharp tongue.
- Heavy Metal (voiced by Sonny Skyhawk/Sonny Roubideaux) – The hungriest little man.

=== Shrek ===
The Seven Dwarfs appear in the Shrek series.

In Shrek, the Seven Dwarfs appear in the first film carrying Snow White's coffin. When Shrek objects to them putting Snow White's coffin on the table, one of the Seven Dwarfs quotes "Where are we supposed to put her? The bed's taken!" Shrek then finds the Big Bad Wolf in his bed.

They are seen again at the start of Shrek 2, giving Shrek a ring engraved with "I love you" in flaming letters for Fiona (in an allusion to the One Ring from The Lord of the Rings).

In Shrek the Third, one of them is given to Fiona as a wedding present (as a babysitter) from Snow White who says she has six more at home.

The Seven Dwarfs are seen at the end of Scared Shrekless when Shrek and Fiona celebrate the night of scares by egging them.

In Shrek The Musical, one of the dwarfs, based on Disney's Grumpy, is written as Farquaad's father who says he abandoned him in the woods as a child after his wife (from The Princess and the Pea) falls out of 25 mattresses. However, when the fairy tale freaks brought Grumpy to Farquaad's wedding, he reveals that he kicked Farquaad out because he was twenty-eight years old and living in his basement.

=== Mirror Mirror ===
In the 2012 film Mirror Mirror, the Seven Dwarfs work as highwaymen and rob from anyone that comes down their way by wearing boots with retractable stilts that make them look taller. The Seven Dwarfs consist of:

- Will Grimm (portrayed by Danny Woodburn) – The leader of the Seven Dwarfs. He is named after the Brothers Grimm.
- Butcher (portrayed by Martin Klebba) – A Dwarf that used to work as a butcher.
- Wolf (portrayed by Sebastian Saraceno) – A Dwarf in a wolf cape who can also howl.
- Napoleon (portrayed by Jordan Prentice) – A Dwarf that wears a hat similar to Napoleon Bonaparte.
- Half Pint (portrayed by Mark Povinelli) – A Dwarf who has a crush on Snow White.
- Grub (portrayed by Joe Gnoffo) – A Dwarf who is always eating.
- Chuck (portrayed by Ronald Lee Clark) – A Dwarf who chuckles a lot.

The Seven Dwarfs help Snow White to form a resistance against Queen Clementianna.

=== Princesses ===
In the Princesses series by Jim C. Hines, the dwarfs are actually anthropomorphic elemental personifications, summoned by Snow to aid her based on a spell from one of her mother's books. The Seven Dwarfs represent Earth, Air, Fire, Water, Light, Shadow, and Magic, although the 'Magic' dwarf is essentially a spirit that just inhabits Snow and enhances her power rather than appearing on its own, with the others appearing in some form to represent their element. Although powerful fighters that will serve Snow loyally, the consequences of summoning them is that Snow must 'pay' the spirits with seven years of her life, with the result that she appears to be in her mid-thirties when she is really only in her early twenties. As a result, she has only summoned the dwarves twice, initially calling on their aid to help her defeat her mother before the series began, and summoning them again to help her and her allies defeat her mother's spirit in the first book in the series (she contemplated summoning them against to deal with the ruthless Wild Hunt in Red Riding's Revenge, but was advised against it as the spiritual nature of the hunt meant that nobody could be sure if the dwarves could do anything against them).

=== Snow White and the Huntsman ===
In Snow White and the Huntsman (2012), the Seven Dwarfs started out as eight dwarfs when they are encountered by Snow White and Eric the Huntsman while fleeing Queen Ravenna. The Eight Dwarfs are:

- Beith (portrayed by Ian McShane) – The leader of the Seven Dwarfs. His name is the name of the first letter ("B") in the Ogham alphabet.
- Muir (portrayed by Bob Hoskins) – The blind elder dwarf who possesses the powers of premonition and is the father of Quert. His name echoes muin, the name of "M" in the Ogham alphabet.
- Quert (portrayed by Johnny Harris) – The son of Muir. His name echoes ceirt, the name of "Q" in the Ogham alphabet.
- Coll (portrayed by Toby Jones) – The brother of Duir. His name is the name of "C" in the Ogham alphabet.
- Duir (portrayed by Eddie Marsan) – The brother of Coll. His name is the name of "D" in the Ogham alphabet.
- Gort (portrayed by Ray Winstone) – An ill-tempered dwarf. His name is the name of "G" in the Ogham alphabet.
- Nion (portrayed by Nick Frost) – Beith's right-hand dwarf. His name is the name of "N" in the Ogham alphabet (sometimes given as nuin).
- Gus (portrayed by Brian Gleeson) – A dwarf who develops a bond with Snow White. He is killed during an attack by Queen Ravenna's men where he sacrifices his life to protect Snow White. His name does not correspond to an Ogham letter.

The Dwarfs were played by actors without dwarfism who had their faces digitally transmuted onto small bodies, prompting a protest from the Little People of America.

In The Huntsman: Winter's War, Nion returns where he aids Eric the Huntsman in retrieving the Magic Mirror which was stolen before it can be sealed away. They are aided by Nion's half-brother Gryff (portrayed by Rob Brydon) who is a debt collector.

=== Once Upon a Time ===
In Once Upon a Time, the Seven Dwarfs (who started out as eight) are on the side of Snow White and go by their Disney names.

- Grumpy (portrayed by Lee Arenberg) is one of eight Dwarf brothers who hatched from their eggs at the same time. Like all dwarfs, he is immediately sent to work in the mines and is given a pickax, which names him Dreamy. Because his egg was accidentally sprinkled with fairy dust by the fairy Nova, he dreams about her and falls in love with her. Later, he meets her and the pair make plans to buy a boat and see the world. However, the Blue Fairy tells him that if he and Nova run away together, she will lose her wings and she will never be truly happy. To prevent this, Dreamy ends their relationship and breaks her heart. He returns to the mines the next day and breaks his pickax mining; when he is given another, it renames him Grumpy. He is later caught possessing a stolen diamond, which he did not know was stolen, and is seen in King George's dungeon in a cell next to Snow White's. He is freed by Stealthy, one of his brothers, and he in turn frees Snow. As he and Stealthy escape, they are discovered by George and his guards and Stealthy is killed. Before the guards can kill Grumpy, Snow goes with George in exchange for Grumpy's life. Grumpy and the remaining six dwarfs run into Snow outside the castle. Grumpy tells her that she must live with the pain of a lost love to grow as a person and does not allow her to drink a potion that makes her forget about her love for Prince James. The seven dwarfs then allow her to live with them. Later, Grumpy goes to tell her that James called off his wedding, but he discovers that she drank the potion. He and his brothers try to confront Snow about her new, mean-spirited behavior, but they drive her to try and kill the Evil Queen instead. He takes her to see Rumplestiltskin, who gave her the potion, but he advises her on the best way to kill the Queen instead. Eventually, Snow regains her memory and apologizes to the dwarfs for her behavior. She decides to rescue James, who was captured by George, and Grumpy and his brothers go with her. Grumpy is later seen discussing the best course of action against the Evil Queen and her curse, calling for war. He is also seen as a guard looking out for the curse in a watchtower of Snow's and James's castle. In Storybrooke, he is Leroy, a janitor at the hospital and the "town drunk." He, like the rest of Storybrooke, is hostile toward Mary Margaret, who is Snow White, after learning about her affair with David Nolan, who is Prince James. He meets Sister Astrid, who is Nova, and decides to help Mary Margaret sell candles for the nunnery and raise money for the nunnery's rent so that he can be near Astrid. When he and Mary Margaret fail to sell enough candles, he lies about the number they sold because he is unable to disappoint Astrid. He tries to sell his boat to Mr. Gold in the hopes that he will forgive the rent. Mr. Gold refuses. Astrid later learns about the candles and is upset that he lied. That night, Leroy causes a blackout, forcing the residents to buy candles. The candles sell out and the nunnery is able to pay its rent. Leroy then offers the grateful Astrid the opportunity to be the first passenger on his boat. Leroy's memories as Grumpy are restored when the curse is broken, and he hugs Snow when he next sees her. He wishes for Regina to be killed by the mob led by Dr. Whale, though he decides against it at Snow's insistence. He unites the Dwarfs together and they begin to mine for fairy dust again.
- Sleepy (portrayed by Faustino Di Bauda) – Sleepy is a sleepy dwarf who is one of the Seven Dwarfs. In Storybrooke, he is Walter, a security guard that works at Storybrooke Hospital who occasionally dozes off on the job.
- Sneezy (portrayed by Gabe Khouth) – Sneezy is a dwarf who often sneezes and is one of the Seven Dwarfs. In Storybrooke, he is Tom Clark, the owner of the Dark Star pharmacy where several characters are seen purchasing different products throughout the show. In Season 2, Sneezy joined the other dwarfs in an experiment that involved why the fairy tale characters cannot leave Storybrooke. Upon drawing the shortest straw, Sneezy crossed the border out of Storybrooke and lost his memories of his past life in Fairy Tale Land once again.
- Doc (portrayed by David Paul Grove) – Doc is a dwarf who is one of the Seven Dwarfs. In Storybrooke, he still has his name but his occupation is unknown.
- Bashful (portrayed by Mig Micario) – Bashful is a dwarf who is one of the Seven Dwarfs. In Storybrooke, his human form is not named.
- Dopey (portrayed by Jeffrey Kaiser) – Dopey is a dwarf who is one of the Seven Dwarfs and has never spoken. In Storybrooke, his human form is not named.
- Happy (portrayed by Michael Coleman) – Happy is a dwarf who is one of the Seven Dwarfs. In Storybrooke, his human form is not named.

There were some other dwarfs that were associated with the Seven Dwarfs:

- Stealthy (portrayed by Geoff Gustafson) was a dwarf who used to be part of the Seven Dwarfs' group, originally being eight members. He received his name from his pickaxe like the other dwarfs because of his skillful infiltration abilities. He once tried to break Grumpy and Snow White out of his prison cell in King George's castle, but was killed during their escape. Grumpy would later comment, "I miss Stealthy", when trying to sneak into an enemy lair. He later ended up in the Underworld and after Henry gives him his unfinished business being his resentment towards Bashful, he is able to move and ask Henry to tell his brother he misses them. In the Wish Realm, Stealthy is seen to be alive after Queen Snow and King David defeated the Evil Queen.
- Bossy (portrayed by Ken Kramer) is a dwarf who is also the leader of the other dwarfs.
- Watchy (portrayed by Richard Ian Cox) is a dwarf who watches over the dwarf eggs until they hatch.

=== Seven and Me ===
The Italian-French TV series Seven and Me, the seven dwarfs appear as the guardians of Snow, a modern-days girl who is a descendant of Snow White.

These dwarfs consist of:

- Brainio, a wise teacher
- Ingenio, an inventor
- Gulpo, who loves food
- Mysterio, an alchemist
- Beefio, the work-out guy
- Deco, a fashionista
- Cuddlio, who is sensitive, sweet and loves to give hugs

=== Additional appearances ===
The following is a list of names of the Seven Dwarfs from various adaptations of the Snow White story. Some adaptations do not name the dwarfs, have seven non-dwarfs (such as the seven Leafe Knights in the anime Prétear - The New Legend of Snow White) or omit them altogether (as in the 1998 opera Schneewittchen).

Title of work	Date and type of work	Names of the seven dwarfs
Snow White and the Seven Dwarfs	1912 play	Blick, Flick, Glick, Snick, Plick, Whick, Quee
Mr. Magoo's Little Snow White	1965 TV episode of The Famous Adventures of Mr. Magoo	Axlerod, Bartholomew, Cornelius, Dexter, Eustace, Ferdinand, George
Faerie Tale Theatre	1984 TV series	Bertram, Bubba, Barnaby, Bernard, Boniface, Bruno, Baldwin
Snow White	1987 Cannon Movie Tales film	Biddy, Diddy, Fiddy, Giddy, Iddy, Kiddy, Liddy
The Legend of Snow White	1994 anime	Boss, Gourmet, Woody, Goldie, Chamomile, Vet, Jolly
Snow White	1994 GoodTimes Entertainment video movie	Sunbeam, Toadstool, Fawn, Hedgehog, Robin, Cricket, Tadpole
Snow White: The Fairest of Them All	2001 TV movie	Monday, Tuesday, Wednesday, Thursday, Friday, Saturday, Sunday
7 Dwarves – Men Alone in the Wood	2004 German comedy film	Brummboss, Sunny, Cloudy, Tschakko, Cookie, Bubi, Speedy
7 Dwarves: The Forest Is Not Enough	2006 German comedy film	Brummboss, Sunny, Cloudy, Tschakko, Cookie, Bubi, Speedy
Sydney White	2007 film	Terrence, Gurkin, Spanky, Embele, Jeremy, Lenny, George
Schneewittchen	2009 TV movie	Gorm, Knirps, Niffel, Quarx, Querx, Schrat, Wichtel
My Fair Godmother	2009 novel	Reginald, Percival, Cedric, Edgar, Cuthbert, Ethelred, Edwin

=== Modern music ===
David Bowie's "Little Wonder" on the Earthling (1997) album lists the individual names of the dwarves.

The music video for the 2001 single "Sonne" by German rock band Rammstein is a parody of Snow White and the Seven Dwarfs, depicting the band members as the Seven Dwarfs mining gold for Snow White.

Taylor Swift mentions both Snow White and the Seven Dwarfs in her song "The Best Day", a track about her mother.

== Response from people with dwarfism ==
As a prominent cultural portrayal, the Seven Dwarfs have been controversial among people with dwarfism. Critical scholar Keri Watson said Disney "followed the conventions of the freak show and perpetuated contemporary prejudices in their constructions of people with dwarfism," portraying them as "incapable, humorous, weird, childlike," and "overly naïve, perhaps even dim-witted."

In 2022, actor Peter Dinklage criticized Disney's planned live-action remake of Snow White and the Seven Dwarfs as being responsible for "renewing damaging stereotypes" saying "You're progressive in one way, but you're still making that fucking backward story of seven dwarves living in the cave. What the fuck are you doing, man?" The Seven Dwarfs actually work as miners in a cave and live in a cottage in the forest. There is also a difference between people with dwarfism and Dwarfs as mythical and fantastical creatures from the European culture, folklore, fantasy and mythology. Some people criticized Dinklage's words either as a good faith misdirection or mistake and as a form of malicious activism or virtue signalling. Others in the dwarfism community like Jeff Brooks and Katrina Kemp expressed different views. Professional wrestler Dylan Postl, better known by his ring persona Hornswoggle, voiced his disagreement with Dinklage's condemnation of the Seven Dwarfs' portrayal, saying that Disney's replacement of them with anonymous "magical creatures," portrayed by voice actors, would have deprived dwarf actors of a possible starring role in a film based on an established property. Comedian Brad Williams also expressed a similar sentiment stating that while he agreed that the portrayal was "mildly offensive," there are ways to work around the issue by depicting the Dwarfs as a potential love interest for Snow White and de-emphasizing the prince's role in the story, also complimenting the positive aspects of the characters: "I mean, they have jobs, you know? They got good friends. They got a house. They like to protect her [Snow White]. They're diamond miners, so they're rich. They're self-made, wealthy."

== See also ==
- Gustaf Tenggren (1936), hired by Walt Disney Productions, to work as a chief illustrator with Snow White and the Seven Dwarfs.
