= Jared S. Gilmore =

American actor

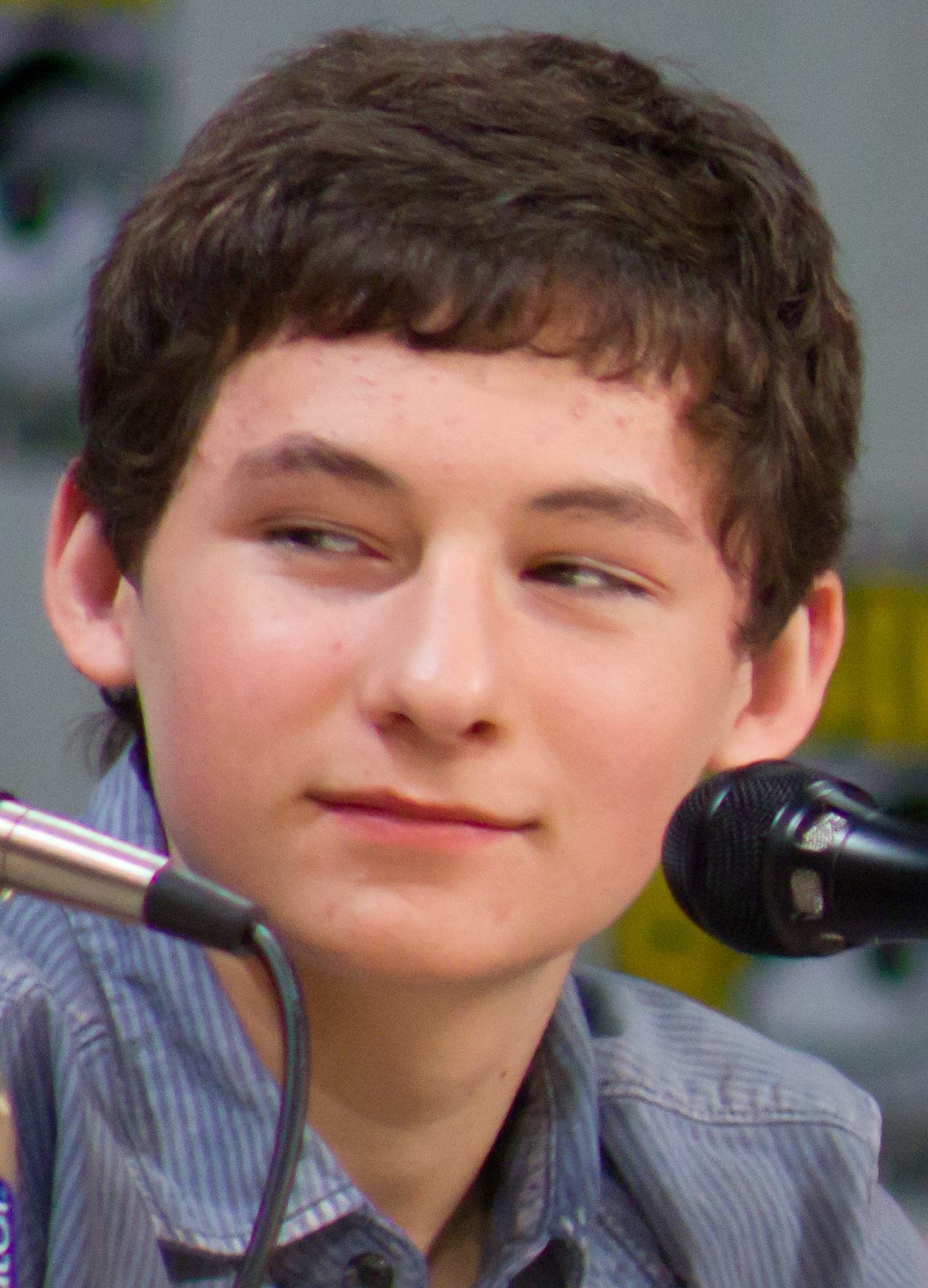
- Gilmore at the 2014 Comic-Con International
- Born: Jared Scott Gilmore; May 30, 2000 (age 26); San Diego, California, U.S.
- Occupations: Actor; streamer
- Years active: 2008–2019

Jared Scott Gilmore (born May 30, 2000) is an American former actor and Twitch streamer. He is best known for his role in the series Once Upon a Time (2011–2018) as Henry Mills.

== Early life ==
Gilmore was born on May 30, 2000, in San Diego, California. For two years, he attended John Robert Powers San Diego, a training school for actors, models, and singers. According to Variety, Gilmore unintentionally began his acting career after running into talent representatives who were interested in his twin sister, Taylor. After many auditions, he acquired his first jobs through modeling T-shirts and acting in commercials. In an interview with the Los Angeles Times, Gilmore said, “Entering the film industry at a young age gave me a chance to mature and get a level of professionalism that is extremely helpful in our world. It's an amazing experience being in the entertainment industry. I'm given a chance to influence people and help people in any way, shape, or form and it's incredible.”

== Career ==
=== Acting ===
Before being cast as Henry Mills in Once Upon a Time, Gilmore held minor roles in Roommates, Wilfred, Without a Trace, Eleventh Hour, The Back-up Plan, and Hawthorne. In 2009, he was cast as Bobby Draper in Mad Men. He was the third actor to play the character, after Maxwell Huckabee and Aaron Hart.

In 2011, Gilmore left Mad Men and was cast in Once Upon a Time as Henry Mills, the adopted son of Regina Mills and biological son of Emma Swan. Series creators Adam Horowitz and Edward Kitsis stated of the role, "One of our emotional centers was an 11-year-old boy who had to be precocious and vulnerable at the same time." Kitsis believed that Gilmore "naturally brought [these characteristics] out... We just knew he had to be our Henry!" Gilmore commented, "I relate to Henry, because I'm 11 and also have a very good imagination. I enjoy making up and playing games in worlds with alternate realities myself."

At the 33rd Young Artist Awards, he won the Award for Best Performance in a TV Series – Leading Young Actor. The following year, at the 34th Young Artist Awards, he was nominated for Best Performance in a TV Series – Leading Young Actor. He was also included among the cast of Mad Men when it won the Screen Actors Guild Award for Outstanding Performance by an Ensemble in a Drama Series in 2010 for season 3. Since the conclusion of Once Upon a Time in 2018, Gilmore has retreated from acting. His last known role was a voice role as the character Shalio in the English dub of Code Geass Lelouch of the Re;surrection, which was released in 2019.

=== Streaming ===
In March 2019, Gilmore was signed to the Overwatch League team Atlanta Reign as a streamer, under the handle "CowboyBeBAMF". After leaving Atlanta Reign, Gilmore was signed to the Overwatch Contenders team Skyfoxes in February 2020. He then began streaming on Twitch under the handle "Nightingale_Styx".

== Personal life ==
In November 2023, Gilmore announced his engagement to his girlfriend Jessica after four years of dating.

== Filmography ==
=== Film ===
Year	Title	Role	Notes	Source
2009	Opposite Day	Baby Bailiff		
2010	The Back-up Plan	Mona's Kid (6 years)		
2010	A Nanny for Christmas	Jonas Ryland		
2012	Overnight	Kyle		
2019	Code Geass Lelouch of the Re;surrection	Shalio	Voice, English dub	

=== Television ===
Year	Title	Role	Notes
2008	Without a Trace	Matthew	Episode: "Driven"
2008	Eleventh Hour	Owen	Episode: "Titans"
2008–09	Talkshow with Spike Feresten	Little Bill O'Reilly	9 episodes
2009	Roommates	Graham	Episode: "The Trash 'N Treasures"
2009–10	Mad Men	Bobby Draper	19 episodes
2010	Hawthorne	Justin Adams	3 episodes
2010	Men of a Certain Age	Kenneth	Episode: "Cold Calls"
2011	Wilfred	Young Ryan	Episode: "Anger"
2011–18	Once Upon a Time	Henry Mills / Sir Henry	Series regular (season 1–6); recurring (season 7); 132 episodes

== Awards and nominations ==
Year	Award	Category	Work	Result
2009	Screen Actors Guild	Outstanding Performance by an Ensemble in a Drama Series	Mad Men	Won
2012	Young Artist Award	Best Performance in a TV Series – Leading Young Actor	Once Upon a Time	Won
2013	Young Artist Award	Best Performance in a TV Series – Leading Young Actor	Once Upon a Time	Nominated
2013	Saturn Awards	Best Performance by a Younger Actor in a Television Series	Once Upon a Time	Nominated
