= David Paul Grove =

Canadian television, film and voice actor

- Born: Calgary, Alberta, Canada
- Other names: Buck, David Grove, Paul David Grove, David Avalon, Daevyd Avalon
- Occupation: Actor
- Years active: 1985–present

David Paul Grove is a Canadian actor.

== Career ==
Grove has voiced Jonny 2x4 in Ed, Edd n Eddy and played one of the Dwarfs, Doc, in Once Upon a Time. He has appeared in several Christmas films like Elf and The Santa Clause. Grove sometimes goes by his nickname "Buck", as is shown in several of the credits of his film and television appearances.

== Filmography ==
=== Film ===
Year	Title	Role	Notes
1994	The Santa Clause	Waiter	
1997	Masterminds	Ferret	
2003	Elf	Pom Pom	
2009	Ed, Edd n Eddy's Big Picture Show	Jonny 2x4	(TV movie)
2012	Down River	Murray	

=== Television ===
Year	Title	Role	Notes
1996	Profit	Edgar	Episode: "Sykes"
1999	The New Addams Family	Death	Episode: "Death Visits the Addams Family"
1998–1999	RoboCop: Alpha Commando	Various voices	
1999–2009	Ed, Edd n Eddy	Jonny 2x4	Series regular
2003	Peacemakers	Telegraph Operator	Episodes: "Legend of the Gun" "A Town Without Pity"
2005–2006	Krypto the Superdog	Robbie the Robin	
2006	Men in Trees	Handsome Man	Episode: "For What It's Worth"
2008	Stargate: Atlantis	Motel Manager	Episode: "Vegas"
2011–2018	Once Upon a Time	Doc	Recurring role
2014	SheZow	Luke Budsen / Masterico	
2016	Beat Bugs	Morgs	Recurring role

=== Video games ===
Year	Title	Role
2005	Ed, Edd n Eddy: The Mis-Edventures	Jonny 2x4
