= Glenn Close on screen and stage =

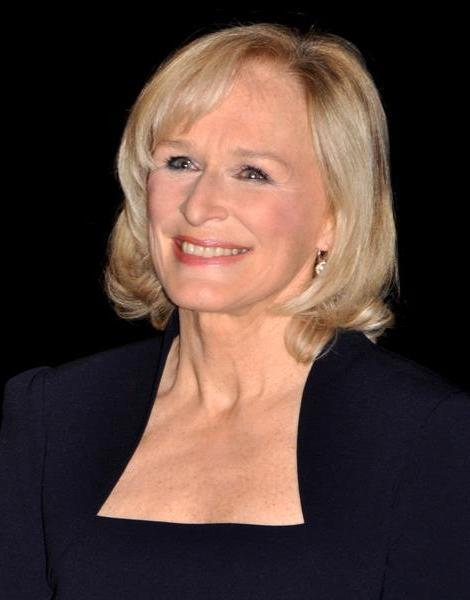
Close at the French premiere of Albert Nobbs in 2012

Glenn Close is an American actress, screenwriter and film producer with an extensive career in film, television, and stage work. She began her professional career in 1974 with a role in the stage play Love for Love and was mostly a stage actress in New York until the early 1980s. Her work included Broadway productions of Barnum in 1980 and The Real Thing in 1983, for which she won the Tony Award for Best Actress in a Play.

Her film debut came in The World According to Garp (1982), which was followed by supporting roles in the films The Big Chill (1983) and The Natural (1984); all three earned her nominations for the Academy Award for Best Supporting Actress. Close went on to establish herself as a Hollywood leading lady with roles in Fatal Attraction (1987) and Dangerous Liaisons (1988), both of which earned her nominations for the Academy Award for Best Actress.

Close won two more Tony Awards for Death and the Maiden in 1992 and Sunset Boulevard in 1995. She won her first Primetime Emmy Award for the 1995 television drama film Serving in Silence: The Margarethe Cammermeyer Story, and she continued a successful film career with starring roles in Reversal of Fortune (1990) and Air Force One (1997), among others, and became even more widely known as a result of her portrayal as the villainous Cruella de Vil in 101 Dalmatians (1996) and its sequel 102 Dalmatians (2000). In 2003, Close portrayed Eleanor of Aquitaine in the television film The Lion in Winter, which earned her a Golden Globe Award. From 2007 to 2012 she starred as Patty Hewes in the television drama series Damages, which won her a Golden Globe Award and two Primetime Emmy Awards. In 2014, she returned to the Broadway stage, appearing in a revival of A Delicate Balance. During this period, she received two additional Best Actress Academy Award nominations for Albert Nobbs (2011) and The Wife (2017). She also won her third Golden Globe for her performance in The Wife. In 2020, she starred in Hillbilly Elegy, earning her a fourth Academy Award nomination for Best Supporting Actress (her eighth nomination in any category), making her one of the five most-nominated actresses in Academy history.

== Filmography ==
Key
†	Denotes works that have not yet been released

=== Film ===
Year	Title	Role	Notes
1982	The World According to Garp	Jenny Fields	
1983	The Big Chill	Sarah Cooper	
1984	The Natural	Iris Gaines	
1984	The Stone Boy	Ruth Hillerman	
1984	Greystoke: The Legend of Tarzan, Lord of the Apes	Jane Porter	Voice, uncredited
1985	Jagged Edge	Theodosia "Teddy" Barnes	
1985	Maxie	Jan Cheyney / Maxie Malone	
1987	Fatal Attraction	Alexandra "Alex" Forrest	
1988	Dangerous Liaisons	Marquise Isabelle de Merteuil	
1988	Light Years	Queen Ambisextra	Voice, English dub of French film
1989	Immediate Family	Linda Spector	
1990	Reversal of Fortune	Sunny von Bülow	
1990	Hamlet	Queen Gertrude	
1991	Hook	Gutless	Cameo
1991	Meeting Venus	Karin Anderson	
1993	The House of the Spirits	Ferula Trueba	
1994	The Paper	Alicia Clark	
1996	Mary Reilly	Mrs. Farraday	
1996	101 Dalmatians	Cruella de Vil	
1996	Mars Attacks!	First Lady Marsha Dale	
1997	Paradise Road	Adrienne Pargiter	
1997	Air Force One	Vice President Kathryn Bennett	
1997	In & Out	Herself	Cameo
1998	Welcome to Hollywood	Herself	Cameo
1999	Cookie's Fortune	Camille Dixon	
1999	Tarzan	Kala	Voice, Reprised role in 2002 DVD Read-Along
2000	102 Dalmatians	Cruella de Vil	
2000	Things You Can Tell Just by Looking at Her	Dr. Elaine Keener	
2001	The Safety of Objects	Esther Gold	
2003	Le Divorce	Olivia Pace	
2003	Pinocchio	The Blue Fairy	Voice
2004	The Stepford Wives	Claire Wellington	
2005	Heights	Diana	
2005	Tarzan II	Kala	Voice, direct-to-DVD
2005	The Chumscrubber	Carrie Johnson	
2005	Nine Lives	Maggie	
2006	Hoodwinked!	Granny Puckett	Voice
2007	Evening	Mrs. Wittenborn	
2011	Hoodwinked Too! Hood vs. Evil	Granny Puckett	Voice
2011	Albert Nobbs	Albert Nobbs	Also writer and producer
2011	Touch of Evil	The Vamp	Short from A Video Gallery of Cinematic Villainy
2014	Low Down	Gram	
2014	Guardians of the Galaxy	Nova Prime Irani Rael	
2015	5 to 7	Arlene	
2015	Anesthesia	Marcia Zarrow	
2015	The Great Gilly Hopkins	Nonnie Hopkins	
2016	Warcraft	Alodi	Uncredited cameo
2016	The Girl with All the Gifts	Dr. Caroline Caldwell	
2017	What Happened to Monday	Nicolette Cayman	
2017	The Wilde Wedding	Eve Wilde	Also executive producer
2017	The Wife	Joan Castleman	
2017	Crooked House	Lady Edith	
2017	Father Figures	Helen Baxter	
2020	Four Good Days	Deb Wheeler	
2020	Hillbilly Elegy	Bonnie "Mamaw" Vance	
2021	Cruella	—N/a	Executive producer
2021	Swan Song	Dr. Scott	
2023	Heart of Stone	King of Diamonds	Cameo
2024	The Deliverance	Alberta Jackson	
2024	Brothers	Cath Munger	
2024	The Summer Book	Grandmother	
2025	Back in Action	Ginny Curtis	
2025	Animal Farm	Freida Pilkington	Voice
2025	Wake Up Dead Man	Martha Delacroix	
2026	La bola negra	Isabelle Durand	
2026	The Hunger Games: Sunrise on the Reaping	Drusilla Sickle	

=== Television ===
Year	Title	Role	Notes
1975	Great Performances	Neighbor	Episode: "The Rules of the Game"
1979	Too Far to Go	Rebecca Kuehn	Television film
1979	Orphan Train	Jessica	Television film
1982	The Elephant Man	Princess Alexandra	Television film
1984	Something About Amelia	Gail Bennett	Television film
1987–1988	Rabbit Ears Storybook Classics	Narrator	Episodes: "The Emperor and the Nightingale, "The Legend of Sleepy Hollow"
1988	Stones for Ibarra	Sara Everton	Television film
1989–1992	Saturday Night Live	Herself (host)	2 episodes
1990	The Tracey Ullman Show	Virginia	Episode: "Creative Differences"
1991	Sarah, Plain and Tall	Sarah Wheaton	Television film, also executive producer
1992	Lincoln	Mary Todd Lincoln (voice)	Television film
1993	Skylark	Sarah Witting	Television film, also executive producer
1995	Serving in Silence	Margarethe Cammermeyer	Television film
1995	Inside the Actors Studio	Herself	Season 2, episode 4
1995–2024	The Simpsons	Mona Simpson (voice)	12 episodes
1996–1998	The Little Lulu Show	Mrs. Van Snobbe / Mrs. Hoggenswallow	Voice; 9 episodes
1997	In the Gloaming	Janet	Television film
1998	Ellen	Herself	Episode: Ellen: A Hollywood Tribute: Part 1
1999	Sarah, Plain and Tall: Winter's End	Sarah Witting	Television film, also executive producer
2000	Baby	Adult Sophie (voice)	Television film, narrator, also executive producer
2001	The Ballad of Lucy Whipple	Arvella Whipple	Television film, also executive producer
2001	South Pacific	Nellie Forbush	Television film, also executive producer
2002	Will & Grace	Fanny Lieber	Episode: "Hocus Focus"
2003	Brush with Fate	Cornelia Engelbrecht	Television film
2003	The Lion in Winter	Eleanor of Aquitaine	Television film
2003	Freedom: A History of US	Eliza Andrews, Mary Antin	PBS Documentary
2004	The West Wing	Evelyn Baker Lang	Episode: "The Supremes"
2004	Strip Search	Karen Moore	Television film
2005	The Shield	Captain Monica Rawling	Main role; 13 episodes (season 4)
2007–2012	Damages	Patricia "Patty" Hewes	Main role; 59 episodes
2015	Louie	Woman	Episode: "Sleepover"
2016	Family Guy	Herself (voice)	Episode: "A Lot Going on Upstairs"
2017	Sea Oak	Aunt Bernie	Pilot; also executive producer
2018–2019	3Below: Tales of Arcadia	Mothership (voice)	22 episodes
2020	Jeopardy! The Greatest of All Time	Herself - Clue Giver / Video Clue Presenter	2 episodes
2022	The Woman in the House Across the Street from the Girl in the Window	Woman in the seat 2A	Episode: "Episode 8"; Cameo
2022	Tehran	Marjan Montazami	Main role (season 2)
2024	The New Look	Carmel Snow	3 episodes
2025–present	All's Fair	Dina Standish	Main role; also executive producer
2026	Hollywood Squares	Self	Panelist; 2 episodes
2026	Up to No Good †	Maud Oldcastle	Main role; upcoming series Also executive producer
TBA	Standing By †	TBA	Upcoming series

=== Documentaries ===
Year	Title	Role
1988	American Experience	Executive producer
1990	Divine Garbo	Host
1992	Broken Hearts, Broken Homes	Executive producer
1999	The Lady with the Torch	Host
2003	In Search of the Jaguar	Narrator
2003	What I Want My Words to Do to You	Narrator
2003	A Closer Walk	Narrator
2007	Gabon: The Last Eden	Narrator
2009	Home	Narrator
2010	Pax	Executive producer and director
2011	Not My Life	Narrator
2012	Love, Marilyn	Narrator
2012	Casting By	Herself
2015	Mind/Game: The Unquiet Journey of Chamique Holdsclaw	Narrator
2016	Broadway: Beyond the Golden Age	Herself
2021	The Me You Can't See	Herself

== Stage ==
Year	Title	Role(s)	Notes
1974	Love for Love	Angelica	Broadway play (New Phoenix Rep at Helen Hayes Theatre)
1974	The Rules of the Game	Neighbour	Broadway play (New Phoenix Rep at Helen Hayes Theatre)
1974	Rex	Princess Mary	Broadway play (New Phoenix Rep at Helen Hayes Theatre)
1974	The Member of the Wedding	Janice	Broadway play (New Phoenix Rep at Helen Hayes Theatre)
1975	King Lear	Cordelia	Milwaukee Repertory Theatre
1976	A Streetcar Named Desire	Stella Kowalski	McCarter Theatre
1977	The Crazy Locomotive	Sophia Tenser / Jeanne Cackleson	Off-Broadway (Chelsea Theater Center)
1977	Uncommon Women and Others	Leilah	Off-Broadway (Phoenix Theatre)
1978	The Crucifer of Blood	Irene St. Claire	Helen Hayes Theatre
1979	Wine Untouched		Off-Broadway (Clurman Theater) (Marymount Manhattan Theatre)
1979	The Winter Dancers	Kettle	Off-Broadway (Clurman Theater) (Marymount Manhattan Theatre)
1980	Barnum	Chairy Barnum	St. James Theatre
1981	Uncle Vanya	Elena	Yale Repertory Theatre
1982	The Singular Life of Albert Nobbs	Albert Nobbs	Off-Broadway (Manhattan Theater Club)
1983	The Real Thing	Annie	Plymouth Theatre
1985	For No Good Reason/Childhood		Off-Broadway (Samuel Beckett Theatre)
1985	Joan of Arc at the Stake		Concert (Theatre of the Church of the Heavenly Rest)
1985	Benefactors	Jane	Brooks Atkinson Theatre
1991	Brooklyn Laundry		Los Angeles (Coronet Theatre)
1992	Death and the Maiden	Paulina Salas	Brooks Atkinson Theatre
1993	Sunset Boulevard	Norma Desmond	Shubert Theatre
1994	Sunset Boulevard	Norma Desmond	Minskoff Theatre
2002	A Streetcar Named Desire	Blanche DuBois	National Theatre
2003	The Play What I Wrote	Mystery Guest Star	Lyceum Theatre
2006	Busker Alley	Dame Libby St. Albans	Off-Broadway musical at the Kaye Playhouse Theater at Hunter College (one-performance benefit concert)
2010	The Normal Heart	Dr. Emma Brookner	Walter Kerr Theatre (one-performance benefit concert)
2012	Into the Woods	The Giant (pre-recorded voice)	Delacorte Theater
2013	The Pirates of Penzance	Ruth	Delacorte Theater
2014	A Delicate Balance	Agnes	John Golden Theatre
2016	Sunset Boulevard	Norma Desmond	London Coliseum
2017	Sunset Boulevard	Norma Desmond	Palace Theatre
2018	Mother of the Maid	Isabelle Romée	The Public Theater

== Commercials ==
Year	Organization	Title	Ref.
2024	Booking.com	Tina Fey Books Whoever She Wants to Be	

== Video game ==
Year	Title	Role	Notes
2002	Quest for the Code	Chalktisha	Voice

== Theme park attractions ==
Year	Title	Role	Venue
2022	Guardians of the Galaxy: Cosmic Rewind	Nova Prime Irani Rael	Epcot

== See also ==
- List of awards and nominations received by Glenn Close
