= List of awards and nominations received by Glenn Close =

Glenn Close awards and nominations
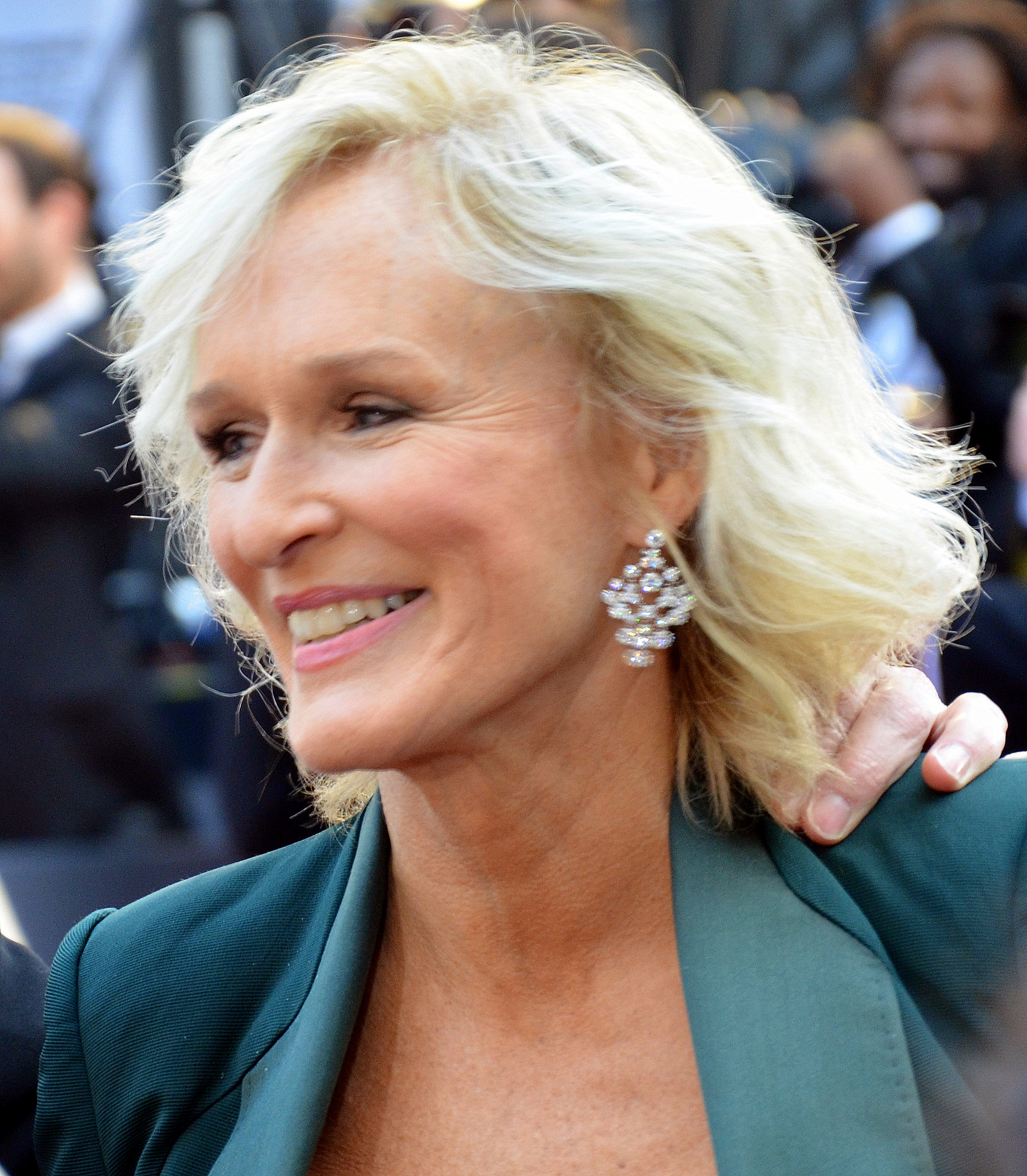
- Close at the 84th Academy Awards in 2012
Totals
Award	Wins	Nominations
Academy Awards	0	8
Actor Awards	2	10
British Academy Film Awards	0	2
Golden Globe Awards	3	16
Grammy Awards	0	3
Primetime Emmy Awards	3	14
Satellite Awards	2	7
Tony Awards	3	4
Other awards	34	58
Wins	48
Nominations	119

Glenn Close is an American actress known for her extensive roles on stage and screen. Over her lengthy prolific career she has received numerous accolades for acting including three Primetime Emmy Awards, three Tony Awards, three Golden Globe Awards, and two Actor Awards as well as nominations for two BAFTA Awards, three Grammy Awards and a Laurence Olivier Award. Additionally, she has been nominated eight times for a competitive Academy Award, holding the record for the most Oscar nominations in an acting category without a win (tied with Peter O'Toole). She has been honored with the Academy Honorary Award in 2026.

Close is one of the seven most-nominated actresses in Academy history. She is tied with Judi Dench and Geraldine Page for fifth place with eight nominations. She has received Academy Award nominations for her roles as feminist mother in The World According to Garp (1982), a baby boomer in The Big Chill (1983), the romantic interest in The Natural (1984), a psychotic ex-lover in Fatal Attraction (1987), noblewoman in Dangerous Liaisons (1988), an English butler in Albert Nobbs (2011), the titular wife in The Wife (2018), and JD Vance's maternal grandmother Bonnie in Hillbilly Elegy (2020). She won the Golden Globe and an Actor Award for Best Actress for The Wife (2018).

For her performances on television she received three Primetime Emmy Awards, her first for the Outstanding Lead Actress in a Limited or Anthology Series or Movie for playing Colonel Margarethe Cammermeyer in the NBC film Serving in Silence: The Margarethe Cammermeyer Story (1995), followed by two consecutive wins for Outstanding Lead Actress in a Drama Series for her role as a brilliant and ruthless lawyer Patty Hewes in the FX legal drama series Damages (2007–2010). She won the Golden Globe Award for Best Actress – Miniseries or Television Film and an Actor Award for Outstanding Actress in a Miniseries or Movie for playing Eleanor of Aquitaine in the Showtime film The Lion in Winter (2003).

On stage, Close won three Tony Awards for her roles on Broadway, two for Best Actress in a Play for playing a woman engaging in an affair in the Tom Stoppard play The Real Thing (1984) and a former political prisoner in the Ariel Dorfman play Death and the Maiden (1992) with her latest win for Best Actress in a Musical portraying the fictional former silent-film star Norma Desmond in the Andrew Lloyd Webber musical Sunset Boulevard (1995). She reprised the role on the West End stage earning a nomination for the Laurence Olivier Award for Best Actress in a Musical in 2017.

== Major associations ==
=== Academy Awards ===
Actor Awards
Year	Category	Nominated work	Result	Ref.
1983	Best Supporting Actress	The World According to Garp	Nominated	
1984	Best Supporting Actress	The Big Chill	Nominated	
1985	Best Supporting Actress	The Natural	Nominated	
1988	Best Actress	Fatal Attraction	Nominated	
1989	Best Actress	Dangerous Liaisons	Nominated	
2012	Best Actress	Albert Nobbs	Nominated	
2019	Best Actress	The Wife	Nominated	
2021	Best Supporting Actress	Hillbilly Elegy	Nominated	
2027	Academy Honorary Award	—N/a	Honored	

=== Actor Awards ===
Actor Awards
Year	Category	Nominated work	Result	Ref.
1996	Outstanding Actress in a Miniseries or TV Movie	Serving in Silence: The Margarethe Cammermeyer Story	Nominated	
1998	Outstanding Actress in a Miniseries or TV Movie	In the Gloaming	Nominated	
2005	Outstanding Actress in a Miniseries or TV Movie	The Lion in Winter	Won	
2008	Outstanding Actress in a Drama Series	Damages (season one)	Nominated	
2010	Outstanding Actress in a Drama Series	Damages (season two)	Nominated	
2011	Outstanding Actress in a Drama Series	Damages (season three)	Nominated	
2012	Outstanding Actress in a Drama Series	Damages (season four)	Nominated	
2012	Outstanding Actress in a Leading Role	Albert Nobbs	Nominated	
2019	Outstanding Actress in a Leading Role	The Wife	Won	
2021	Outstanding Actress in a Supporting Role	Hillbilly Elegy	Nominated	

=== BAFTA Awards ===
British Academy Film Awards
Year	Category	Nominated work	Result	Ref.
1990	Best Actress in a Leading Role	Dangerous Liaisons (Note: Dangerous Liaisons was released in the UK in 1989 (1988 in US).)	Nominated	
2019	Best Actress in a Leading Role	The Wife	Nominated	

=== Emmy Awards ===
Primetime Emmy Awards
Year	Category	Nominated work	Result	Ref.
1984	Outstanding Lead Actress in a Limited Series or Movie	Something About Amelia	Nominated	
1991	Outstanding Limited Series (as executive producer)	Sarah, Plain and Tall	Nominated	
1991	Outstanding Lead Actress in a Limited Series or Movie	Sarah, Plain and Tall	Nominated	
1993	Outstanding Lead Actress in a Limited Series or Movie	Skylark	Nominated	
1995	Outstanding Lead Actress in a Limited Series or Movie	Serving in Silence: The Margarethe Cammermeyer Story	Won	
1995	Outstanding Television Movie (as executive producer)	Serving in Silence: The Margarethe Cammermeyer Story	Nominated	
1997	Outstanding Lead Actress in a Limited Series or Movie	In the Gloaming	Nominated	
2002	Outstanding Guest Actress in a Comedy Series	Will and Grace (episode: "Hocus Focus")	Nominated	
2004	Outstanding Lead Actress in a Limited Series or Movie	The Lion in Winter	Nominated	
2005	Outstanding Lead Actress in a Drama Series	The Shield (episode: "Hurt")	Nominated	
2008	Outstanding Lead Actress in a Drama Series	Damages (episode: "Get Me a Lawyer")	Won	
2009	Outstanding Lead Actress in a Drama Series	Damages (episode: "Trust Me")	Won	
2010	Outstanding Lead Actress in a Drama Series	Damages (episode: "Your Secrets Are Safe")	Nominated	
2012	Outstanding Lead Actress in a Drama Series	Damages (episode: "I've Done Way Too Much for This Girl")	Nominated	

=== Golden Globe Awards ===
Golden Globe Awards
Year	Category	Nominated work	Result	Ref.
1985	Best Actress in a Miniseries or TV Movie	Something About Amelia	Nominated	
1986	Best Actress – Motion Picture Musical or Comedy	Maxie	Nominated	
1988	Best Actress – Motion Picture Drama	Fatal Attraction	Nominated	
1992	Best Actress in a Miniseries or TV Movie	Sarah, Plain and Tall	Nominated	
1996	Best Actress in a Miniseries or TV Movie	Serving in Silence: The Margarethe Cammermeyer Story	Nominated	
1996	Best Miniseries or Television Film (executive producer)	Serving in Silence: The Margarethe Cammermeyer Story	Nominated	
1997	Best Actress – Motion Picture Musical or Comedy	101 Dalmatians	Nominated	
2005	Best Actress in a Miniseries or TV Movie	The Lion in Winter	Won	
2006	Best Actress in a TV Drama Series	The Shield	Nominated	
2008	Best Actress in a TV Drama Series	Damages	Won	
2010	Best Actress in a TV Drama Series	Damages	Nominated	
2012	Best Actress – Motion Picture Drama	Albert Nobbs	Nominated	
2012	Best Original Song	"Lay Your Head Down" (from Albert Nobbs)	Nominated	
2013	Best Actress in a TV Drama Series	Damages	Nominated	
2019	Best Actress – Motion Picture Drama	The Wife	Won	
2021	Best Supporting Actress – Motion Picture	Hillbilly Elegy	Nominated	

=== Grammy Awards ===
Grammy Awards
Year	Category	Nominated work	Result	Ref.
1985	Best Spoken Word Album	The Real Thing (with Jeremy Irons)	Nominated	
1988	Best Recording for Children (Note: Credited as narrator.)	The Emperor and the Nightingale	Nominated	
1989	Best Recording for Children	The Legend of Sleepy Hollow	Nominated	

=== Laurence Olivier Awards ===
Laurence Olivier Awards
Year	Category	Nominated work	Result	Ref.
2017	Best Actress in a Musical	Sunset Boulevard	Nominated	

=== Tony Awards ===
Tony Awards
Year	Category	Nominated work	Result	Ref.
1980	Best Featured Actress in a Musical	Barnum	Nominated	
1984	Best Actress in a Play	The Real Thing	Won	
1992	Best Actress in a Play	Death and the Maiden	Won	
1995	Best Actress in a Musical	Sunset Boulevard	Won	

== Other theatre awards ==
Organizations	Year	Category	Work	Result	Ref.
Drama Desk Awards	1992	Outstanding Actress in a Play	Death and the Maiden	Nominated	
Drama Desk Awards	1995	Outstanding Actress in a Musical	Sunset Boulevard	Won	
Drama League Awards	1992	Distinguished Performance	Death and the Maiden	Won	
Evening Standard Awards	2016	Best Musical Performance	Sunset Boulevard	Won	
Obie Awards	1982	Best Actress in a Play	The Singular Life of Albert Nobbs	Won	

== Miscellaneous awards ==
Year	Association	Category	Project	Result	Ref.
1982	Los Angeles Film Critics Association	Best Supporting Actress	The World According to Garp	Won	
1982	National Board of Review	Best Supporting Actress	The World According to Garp	Won	
1982	National Society of Film Critics	Best Supporting Actress	The World According to Garp	Runner-up	
1982	New York Film Critics Circle	Best Supporting Actress	The World According to Garp	Runner-up	
1985	Saturn Award	Best Actress	Maxie	Nominated	
1987	Goldene Kamera Award	Best Actress	Fatal Attraction	Won	
1987	David di Donatello – Award	Best Foreign Actress	Fatal Attraction	Nominated	
1987	People's Choice Award	Favorite Motion Picture Actress	Fatal Attraction	Won	
1988	Chicago Film Critics Association	Best Actress	Dangerous Liaisons	Nominated	
1988	Goldene Kamera Award	Best Actress	Dangerous Liaisons	Won	
1990	David di Donatello Award	Best Foreign Actress	Hamlet	Nominated	
1991	Venice Film Festival	Best Actress - Golden Ciak	Meeting Venus	Won	
1996	BE Award	Favorite Actor/Actress – Family Film	101 Dalmatians	Won	
1996	Satellite Award	Best Actress – Motion Picture Musical or Comedy	101 Dalmatians	Nominated	
1996	Saturn Award	Best Supporting Actress	101 Dalmatians	Nominated	
1996	Online Film and Television Award	Best Comedy Musical Actress	101 Dalmatians	Nominated	
1997	BE Award	Favorite Supporting Actress Action/Adventure Film	Air Force One	Won	
1997	CableACE Award	Guest Actress in a Dramatic Special/Series	In the Gloaming	Won	
1997	Online Film and Television Award	Best Actress in a Motion Picture or Miniseries (Note: Shared)	In the Gloaming	Won	
1997	Online Film and Television Award	Best Sci-fi/Fantasy/Horror Actress	Mars Attacks!	Nominated	
1997	Satellite Award	Best Actress in a Musical or Comedy	101 Dalmatians	Nominated	
1998	Satellite Award	Best Actress – Miniseries or Television Film	In the Gloaming	Nominated	
2000	Satellite Award	Best Actress in a Musical or Comedy	102 Dalmatians	Nominated	
2002	Online Film and Television Award	Best Guest Actress in a Comedy Series	Will & Grace	Nominated	
2004	Online Film and Television Award	Best Actress in a Motion Picture or Miniseries	The Lion in Winter	Won	
2004	Online Film and Television Award	Online Film and Television Award	The West Wing	Won	
2005	Online Film and Television Award	Best Actress in a Drama Series	The Shield	Nominated	
2005	Locarno IFF	Bronze Leopard Award for Best Actress	Nine Lives	Won	
2005	Gotham Independent Film Award	Best Ensemble Cast	Nine Lives	Nominated	
2008	Online Film and Television Award	Best Actress in a Drama Series	Damages	Nominated	
2008	Television Critics Association	Individual Achievement in Drama	Damages	Nominated	
2009	Television Critics Association	Individual Achievement in Drama	Damages	Nominated	
2009	Online Film and Television Award	Best Actress in a Drama Series	Damages	Nominated	
2010	Online Film and Television Award	Best Actress in a Drama Series	Damages	Nominated	
2010	Gracie Award	Outstanding Female Lead in a Drama Series	Damages	Won	
2011	AACTA International Award	Best Actress	Albert Nobbs	Nominated	
2011	Houston Film Critics Society	Best Original Song	Albert Nobbs	Nominated	
2011	Irish Film & Television Award	Best International Actress	Albert Nobbs	Won	
2011	Irish Film & Television Award	Best Film (Note: Credited as producer)	Albert Nobbs	Nominated	
2011	Irish Film & Television Award	Best Script for Film (Note: Shared with John Banville)	Albert Nobbs	Nominated	
2011	Phoenix Film Society Award	Best Actress	Albert Nobbs	Nominated	
2011	Tokyo International Film Festival Award	Best Actress	Albert Nobbs	Won	
2011	Women Film Critics Circle Award	Courage in Acting	Albert Nobbs	Won	
2011	Satellite Award	Best Actress	Albert Nobbs	Nominated	
2011	Satellite Award	Best Adapted Screenplay (shared with John Banville)	Albert Nobbs	Nominated	
2011	Satellite Award	Best Original Song	"Lay Your Head Down" (from Albert Nobbs)	Won	
2013	Online Film and Television Award	Best Actress in a Drama Series	Damages	Nominated	
2014	Phoenix Film Society Award	Best Ensemble Acting	Guardians of the Galaxy	Nominated	
2018	AARP Movies for Grownups Award	Best Actress	The Wife	Won	
2018	Critics' Choice Movie Award	Best Actress (Note: Tied with Lady Gaga for A Star Is Born)	The Wife	Won	
2018	Gotham Independent Film Award	Best Actress	The Wife	Nominated	
2018	Hollywood Film Award	Best Actress	The Wife	Won	
2018	Independent Spirit Award	Best Female Lead	The Wife	Won	
2018	Palm Springs International Film Festival	Icon Award	The Wife	Won	
2018	San Diego Film Critics Society Award	Best Actress	The Wife	Won	
2018	Satellite Award	Best Actress Motion Picture – Drama	The Wife	Won	
2020	AARP Movies for Grownups Awards	Best Supporting Actress	Hillbilly Elegy	Nominated	
2020	Critics' Choice Movie Award	Best Supporting Actress	Hillbilly Elegy	Nominated	
2020	Hollywood Critics Association Awards	Best Supporting Actress	Hillbilly Elegy	Nominated	
2020	Music City Film Critics' Association Awards	Best Supporting Actress	Hillbilly Elegy	Nominated	
2020	Nevada Film Critics Society Awards	Best Supporting Actress	Hillbilly Elegy	Won	
2020	San Francisco International Film Festival	Acting Award	Hillbilly Elegy	Won	
2020	Sunset Circle Awards	Best Actress	Hillbilly Elegy	Runner-up	
2020	Sunset Circle Awards	Best Ensemble	Hillbilly Elegy	Runner-up	
2020	Golden Raspberry Awards	Worst Supporting Actress	Hillbilly Elegy	Nominated	
2025	AACTA International Awards	Best Supporting Actress	Wake Up Dead Man	Nominated	
2025	Astra Film Awards	Best Supporting Actress – Comedy or Musical	Wake Up Dead Man	Nominated	
2025	Kansas City Film Critics Circle	Best Supporting Actress	Wake Up Dead Man	Nominated	
2025	New York Film Critics Online	Best Supporting Actress	Wake Up Dead Man	Nominated	
2025	St. Louis Film Critics Association	Best Supporting Actress	Wake Up Dead Man	Nominated	
2026	Jussi Awards	Best Ensemble (with Emily Matthews)	The Summer Book	Nominated	

== Honorary awards ==
Organizations	Year	Award	Result	Ref.
New York Women in Film & TV	1989	Muse Award	Honored	
Sho/West Convention USA	1989	Female Star of the Year	Honored	
Hasty Pudding Theatricals	1990	Hasty Pudding Woman of the Year	Honored	
Women in Film	2001	Crystal Award	Honored	
GLAAD	2002	GLAAD Excellence in Media Award	Honored	
Gotham Award	2003	Tribute Award	Honored	
Common Wealth Award	2008	Outstanding Achievement in the Dramatic Arts	Honored	
Hollywood Walk of Fame	2009	Motion Picture Star	Honored	
Mill Valley Film Festival	2011	Tribute Award	Honored	
San Sebastián IFF	2011	Donostia Award	Honored	
Hollywood Film Awards	2011	Career Achievement Award	Honored	
Chase Community Giving	2012	American Giving Award	Honored	
New York Women in Communications	2012	Matrix Award	Honored	
Palm Springs IFF	2012	Career Achievement Award	Honored	
Sundance Film Festival	2014	Vanguard Leadership Award	Honored	
American Theater Hall of Fame	2016	Inductee	Honored	
Zurich Film Festival	2017	Golden Icon Award	Honored	
Santa Barbara International Film Festival	2019	Maltin Modern Master Award	Honored	
Variety Creative Impact Awards	2021	Creative Impact in Acting Award	Honored	

== Academic honors ==
Organizations	Year	Award	Result	Ref.
Choate Rosemary Hall	1982	Rosemary Hall Alumnae Award	Honored	
College of William and Mary	1989	Honorary Doctor of Arts	Honored	
Mount Holyoke College	1989	Honorary Doctor of Humane Letters	Honored	
Queen's University	2013	Honorary Doctor of Laws Degree	Honored	
Bates College	2014	Honorary Doctor of Fine Arts	Honored	
