= List of awards and nominations received by Damages =

List of awards won by Damages
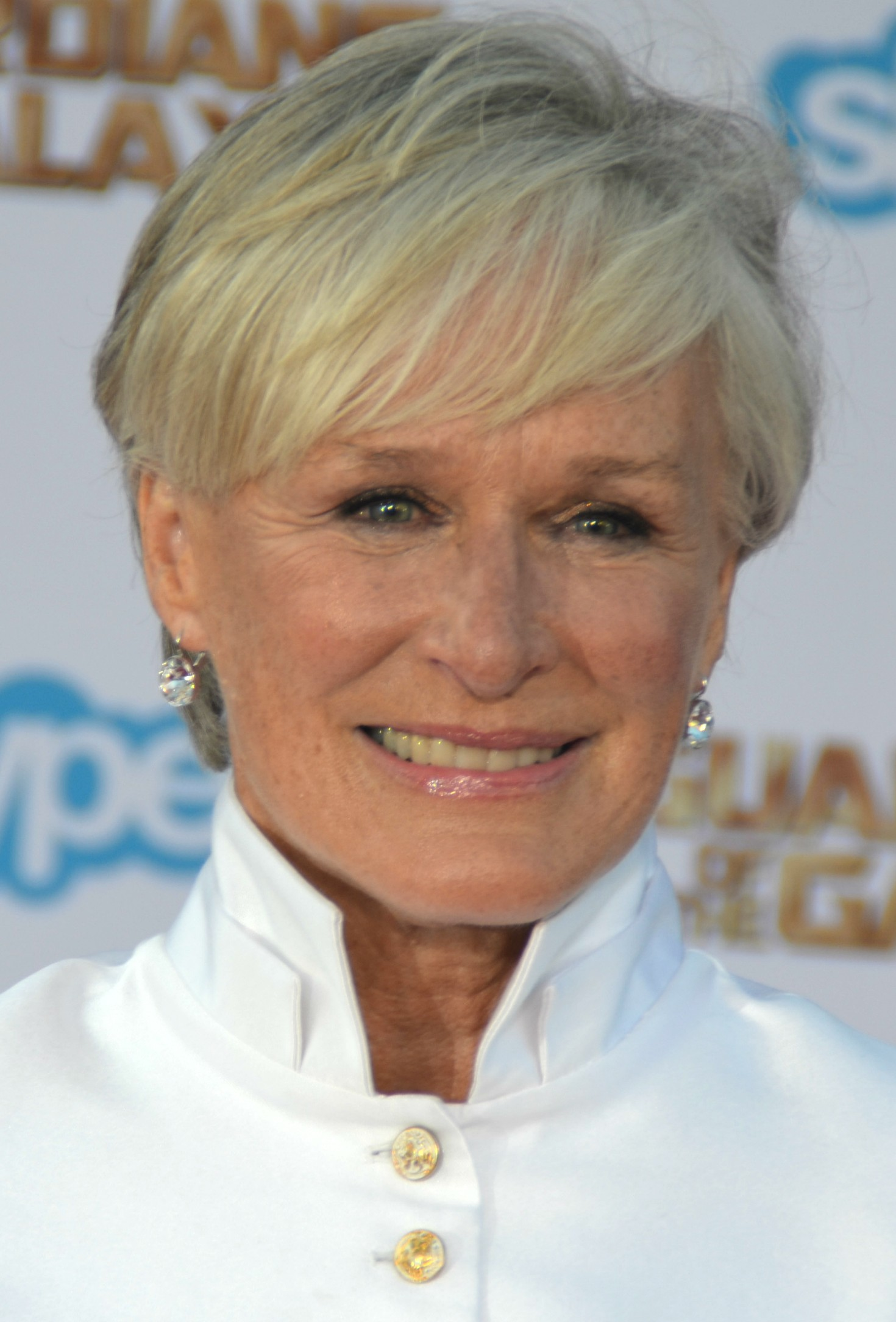
- Glenn Close won many awards for her performance as Patty Hewes.
Awards and nominations
Award	Won	Nominated
American Cinema Editors Awards	0	1
Australian Film Institute Awards	1	2
Artios Awards	1	4
Biarritz International Festival of Audiovisual Programming	0	1
Crime Thriller Awards	0	2
Critics' Choice Television Awards	0	1
Dorian Awards	0	2
Edgar Allan Poe Awards	0	2
Emmy Awards	4	20
Geneva International Film Festival Tous Ecrans	0	1
Golden Globe Awards	1	9
Golden Reel Awards	0	5
Gracie Awards	1	1
IGN Summer Movie Awards	0	2
Producers Guild of America Awards	0	1
Satellite Awards	1	7
Screen Actors Guild Awards	0	4
TCA Awards	0	4
Women's Image Network Awards	1	1
Writers Guild of America Award	0	1
- Total number of wins and nominations
Totals	11	70
- References

Damages is an American legal thriller television series created by Todd A. Kessler, Glenn Kessler and Daniel Zelman and produced by KZK Productions, Sony Pictures Television, FX Productions, Bluebush Productions and Gotham Music Placement. The series chronicles the relationship between Patty Hewes (Glenn Close), a high powered attorney, and her protégée Ellen Parsons (Rose Byrne) as well as the major case they take on each season. Damages aired on FX from July 24, 2007 to September 12, 2012, broadcasting 59 episodes over five seasons during its initial run.

During the series' run, Damages received nominations for a variety of different awards, including 20 Emmy awards (with 4 wins), eight Golden Globe Awards (with one win), four Screen Actors Guild Awards, and 4 TCA Awards. Glenn Close, for her portrayal of Patty Hewes, received the most individual awards and nominations, winning 2 Emmy awards, a Golden Globe award and a Satellite award.

== Awards and nominations ==
=== Emmy Awards ===
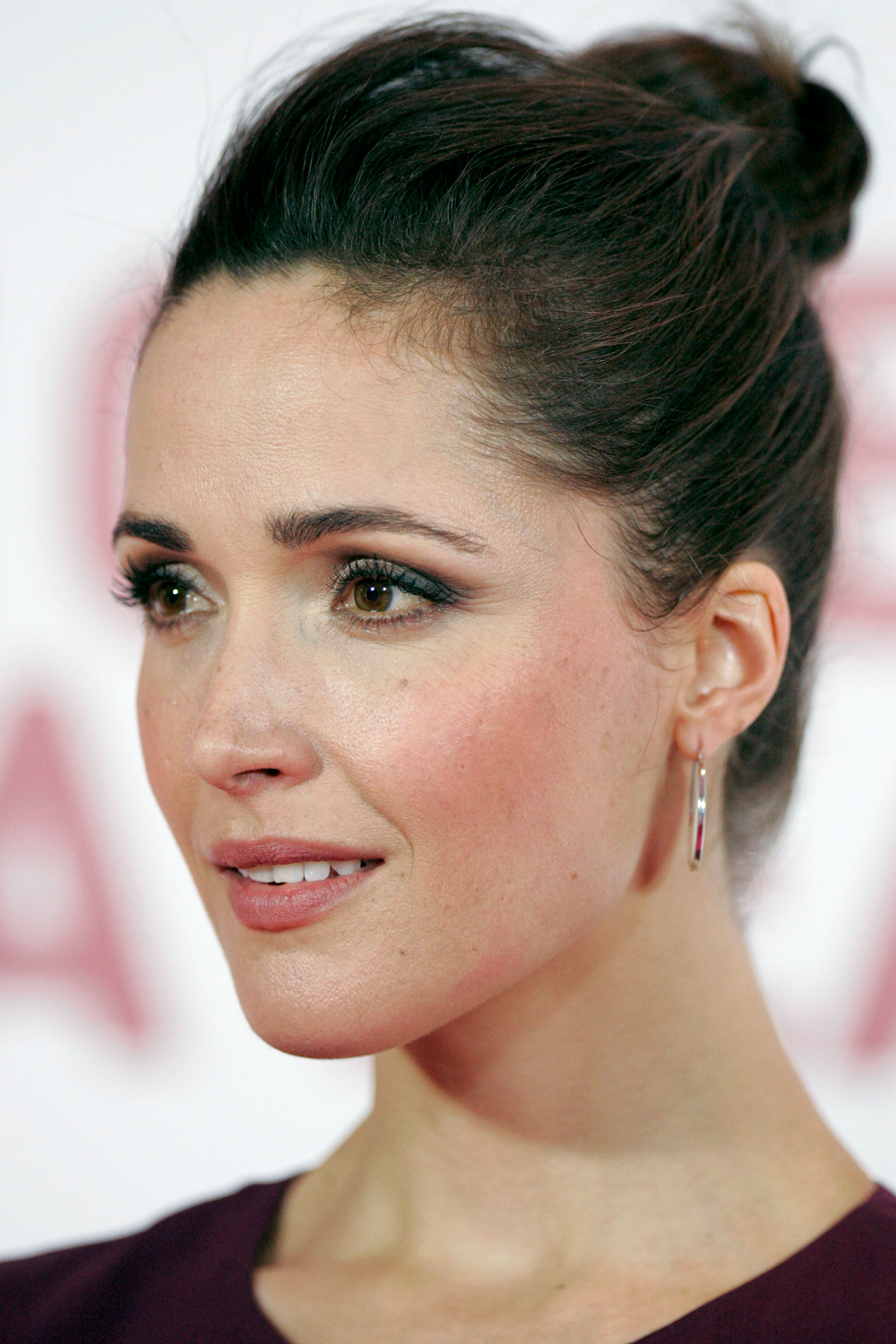
Rose Byrne received two Emmy nominations for her role as Ellen Parsons.

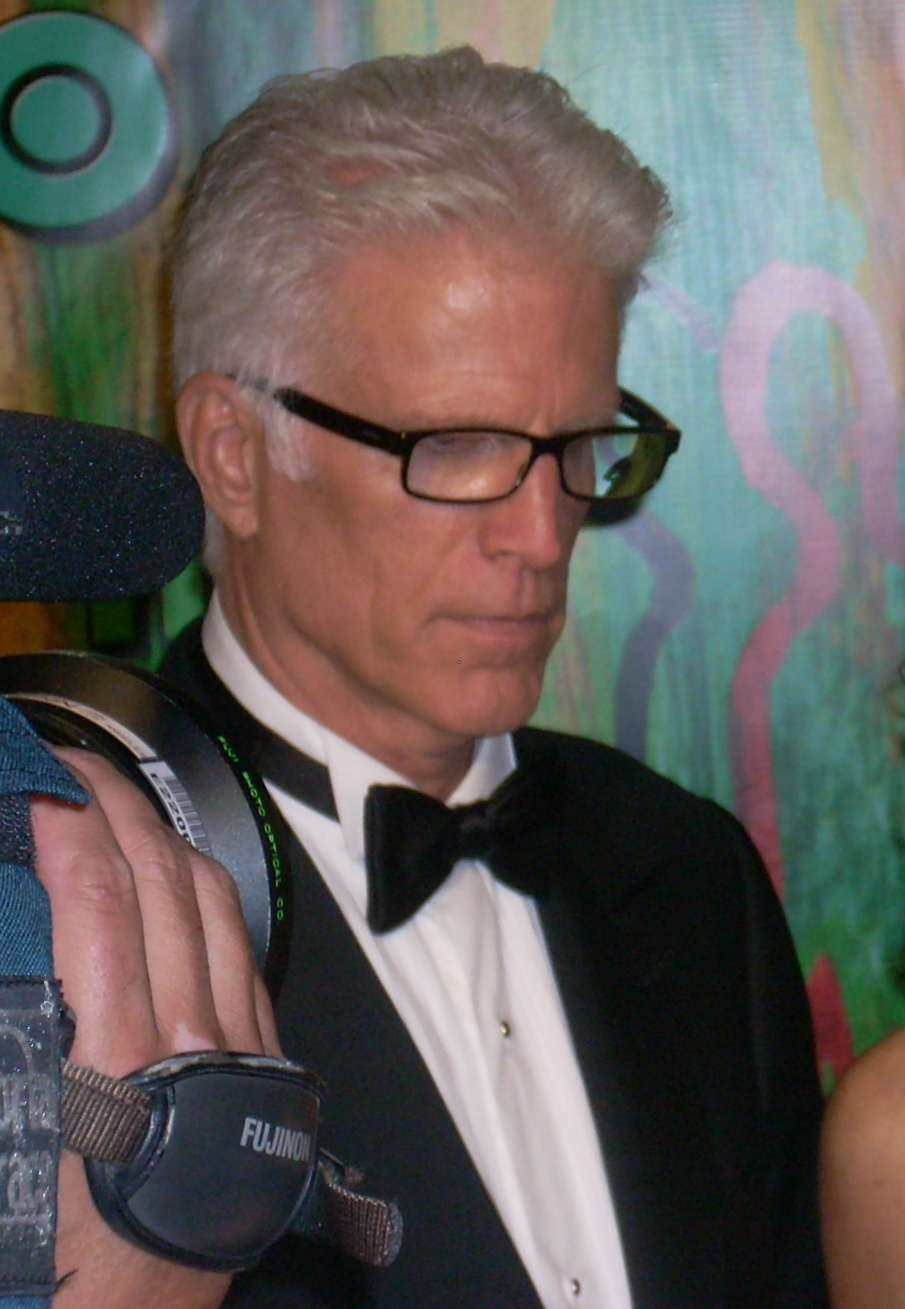
Ted Danson received three Emmy nominations for his performance in the series.

Damages received 20 Primetime Emmy Award nominations, with four wins — three Primetime and one Creative Arts. The series received two nominations for the award for Outstanding Drama Series in 2008 and 2009. Glenn Close won the award for Outstanding Lead Actress in a Drama Series in 2008 and 2009, and received a nomination for the award in 2010 and 2012. The series received nominations for Outstanding Supporting Actor in a Drama Series four times, with Željko Ivanek receiving the award in 2008. The series won a Creative Arts Emmy Award for Outstanding Casting for a Drama Series in 2008.

==== Primetime Emmy Awards ====
Year	Category	Nominee(s)	Episodes(s)	Result	Ref
2008	Outstanding Drama Series	Mark A. Baker, Todd A. Kessler, Glenn Kessler and Daniel Zelman		Nominated	
2008	Outstanding Lead Actress in a Drama Series	Glenn Close as Patty Hewes	for "Get Me a Lawyer"	Won	
2008	Outstanding Supporting Actor in a Drama Series	Ted Danson as Arthur Frobisher	for "Jesus, Mary, and Joe Cocker"	Nominated	
2008	Outstanding Supporting Actor in a Drama Series	Željko Ivanek as Ray Fiske	for "I Hate These People"	Won	
2008	Outstanding Directing for a Drama Series	Allen Coulter	for "Get Me a Lawyer"	Nominated	
2008	Outstanding Writing for a Drama Series	Glenn Kessler, Todd A. Kessler, and Daniel Zelman	for "Get Me a Lawyer"	Nominated	
2009	Outstanding Drama Series	Mark A. Baker, Todd A. Kessler, Glenn Kessler, Daniel Zelman, and Aaron Zelman		Nominated	
2009	Outstanding Lead Actress in a Drama Series	Glenn Close as Patty Hewes	for "Trust Me"	Won	
2009	Outstanding Supporting Actor in a Drama Series	William Hurt as Daniel Purcell	for "Hey! Mr. Pibb!"	Nominated	
2009	Outstanding Supporting Actress in a Drama Series	Rose Byrne as Ellen Parsons	for "Trust Me"	Nominated	
2009	Outstanding Guest Actor in a Drama Series	Ted Danson as Arthur Frobisher	for "They Had to Tweeze That Out of My Kidney"	Nominated	
2009	Outstanding Directing for a Drama Series	Todd A. Kessler	for "Trust Me"	Nominated	
2010	Outstanding Lead Actress in a Drama Series	Glenn Close as Patty Hewes	for "Your Secrets Are Safe"	Nominated	
2010	Outstanding Supporting Actor in a Drama Series	Martin Short as Leonard Winstone	for "You Haven't Replaced Me"	Nominated	
2010	Outstanding Supporting Actress in a Drama Series	Rose Byrne as Ellen Parsons	for "Your Secrets are Safe"	Nominated	
2010	Outstanding Guest Actor in a Drama Series	Ted Danson as Arthur Frobisher	for "The Next One’s Gonna Go in Your Throat"	Nominated	
2010	Outstanding Guest Actress in a Drama Series	Lily Tomlin as Marilyn Tobin	for "Your Secrets are Safe"	Nominated	
2012	Outstanding Lead Actress in a Drama Series	Glenn Close as Patty Hewes	for "I've Done Way Too Much for This Girl"	Nominated	

==== Creative Arts Emmy Awards ====
Year	Category	Nominee(s)	Result	Ref
2008	Outstanding Casting for a Drama Series	Avy Kaufman, Ross Meyerson and Julie Tucker	Won	
2009	Outstanding Casting for a Drama Series	Ross Meyerson and Julie Tucker	Nominated	

=== Golden Globe Awards ===
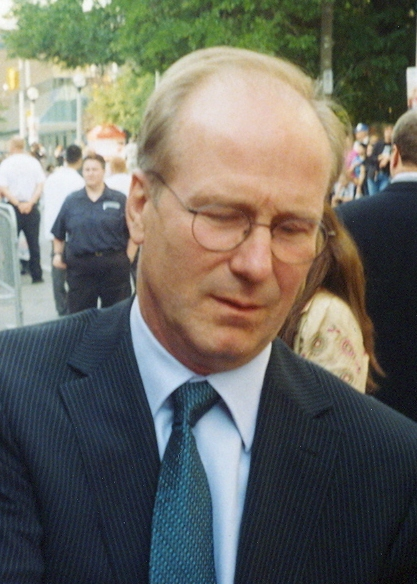
William Hurt was nominated for a Golden Globe Award for his performance as Daniel Purcell.

Damages received eight Golden Globe Award nominations during its tenure, with one win for Best Actress – Television Series Drama for Glenn Close.

Year	Category	Nominee(s)	Result	Ref
2007	Best Television Series – Drama		Nominated	
2007	Best Actress – Television Series Drama	Glenn Close as Patty Hewes	Won	
2007	Best Supporting Actress – Series, Miniseries or Television Film	Rose Byrne as Ellen Parsons	Nominated	
2007	Best Supporting Actor – Series, Miniseries or Television Film	Ted Danson as Arthur Frobisher	Nominated	
2009	Best Actress – Television Series Drama	Glenn Close as Patty Hewes	Nominated	
2009	Best Supporting Actress – Series, Miniseries or Television Film	Rose Byrne as Ellen Parsons	Nominated	
2009	Best Supporting Actor – Series, Miniseries or Television Film	William Hurt as Daniel Purcell	Nominated	
2012	Best Actress – Television Series Drama	Glenn Close as Patty Hewes	Nominated	

=== Golden Reel Awards ===
Year	Category	Nominee(s)	Episode(s)	Result	Ref
2008	Best Sound Editing - Music for Short Form Television	Robert Cotnoir	for "Tastes Like a Ho Ho"	Nominated	
2010	Best Sound Editing - Long Form Music in Television	Robert Cotnoir	for "Trust Me"	Nominated	
2010	Best Sound Editing - Long Form Dialogue and ADR in Television	Fred Rosenberg, David Ellinwood, Louis Bertini, Eliza Paley, and Lidia Tamplenizza	for "Trust Me"	Nominated	
2012	Best Sound Editing - Short Form Music in Television	Robert Cotnoir	for "Failure Is Lonely"	Nominated	
2013	Best Sound Editing - Long Form Music in Television	Robert Cotnoir	for "But You Don't Do That Anymore"	Nominated	

=== Satellite Awards ===
Year	Category	Nominee(s)	Result	Ref
2007	Best Actress – Television Series Drama	Glenn Close as Patty Hewes	Nominated	
2008	Best Actress – Television Series Drama	Glenn Close as Patty Hewes	Nominated	
2008	Best Supporting Actor – Series, Miniseries or Television Film	Željko Ivanek as Ray Fiske	Nominated	
2009	Best Television Series – Drama		Nominated	
2009	Best Actress – Television Series Drama	Glenn Close as Patty Hewes	Won	
2010	Best Supporting Actor – Series, Miniseries or Television Film	Martin Short as Leonard Winstone	Nominated	
2010	Best Supporting Actress – Series, Miniseries or Television Film	Rose Byrne as Ellen Parsons	Nominated	

=== Screen Actors Guild Awards ===
Damages received four Screen Actors Guild Award nominations, all for Outstanding Performance by a Female Actor in a Drama Series for Glenn Close.

Year	Category	Nominee(s)	Result	Ref
2007	Outstanding Performance by a Female Actor in a Drama Series	Glenn Close as Patty Hewes	Nominated	
2009	Outstanding Performance by a Female Actor in a Drama Series	Glenn Close as Patty Hewes	Nominated	
2010	Outstanding Performance by a Female Actor in a Drama Series	Glenn Close as Patty Hewes	Nominated	
2011	Outstanding Performance by a Female Actor in a Drama Series	Glenn Close as Patty Hewes	Nominated	

=== Television Critics Association Awards ===
During its tenure, Damages received four TCA Award nominations - two for the series and two individual awards for Glenn Close.

Year	Category	Nominee(s)	Result	Ref
2008	Outstanding Achievement in Drama		Nominated	
2008	Outstanding New Program		Nominated	
2008	Individual Achievement in Drama	Glenn Close	Nominated	
2009	Individual Achievement in Drama	Glenn Close	Nominated	

=== Other awards ===
Award	Date of ceremony	Category	Nominee(s)	Result	Ref
ACE Eddie Awards	2007	Best Edited One-Hour TV Series - Commercial Television	Malcolm Jamieson for "Get Me a Lawyer"	Nominated	
AFI Awards	2007	International Award for Best Actress	Rose Byrne	Won	
AFI Awards	2009	International Award for Best Actress	Rose Byrne	Nominated	
Artios Awards	2008	Outstanding Achievement in Casting - Television Series - Drama	Julie Tucker	Won	
Artios Awards	2008	Outstanding Achievement in Casting - Television Pilot - Drama	Avy Kaufman and Julie Tucker	Nominated	
Artios Awards	2009	Outstanding Achievement in Casting - Television Series - Drama	Ross Meyerson and Julie Tucker	Nominated	
Artios Awards	2010	Outstanding Achievement in Casting - Television Series - Drama	Ross Meyerson and Julie Tucker	Nominated	
Biarritz International Festival of Audiovisual Programming	2007	Golden FIPA for TV Series and Serial	Mark A. Baker, Todd A. Kessler, Glenn Kessler and Daniel Zelman	Nominated	
Crime Thriller Awards	2010	Best International TV Drama		Nominated	
Crime Thriller Awards	2010	Best Leading Actress	Glenn Close	Nominated	
Edgar Allan Poe Award	2010	Best Television Episode Teleplay	Todd A. Kessler, Glenn Kessler and Daniel Zelman for "Look What He Dug Up This Time"	Nominated	
Edgar Allan Poe Award	2011	Best Television Episode Teleplay	Todd A. Kessler, Glenn Kessler and Daniel Zelman for "The Next One's Gonna Go In Your Throat"	Nominated	
Dorian Awards	2010	TV Drama Performance of the Year	Glenn Close	Nominated	
Dorian Awards	2011	TV Drama of the Year		Nominated	
Geneva International Film Festival Tous Ecrans	2007	Best International Series	Allen Coulter, Todd A. Kessler, Glenn Kessler, and Daniel Zelman	Nominated	
Gracie Awards	2010	Outstanding Female Actor in a Leading Role in a Drama Series or Special	Glenn Close	Won	
IGN Summer Movie Awards	2010	Best TV Actress	Rose Byrne	Won	
IGN Summer Movie Awards	2010	Best TV Actress	Glenn Close	Nominated	
Producers Guild of America Awards	2008	Best Episodic Drama	Mark A. Baker, Glenn Kessler, Todd A. Kessler and Daniel Zelman	Nominated	
Women's Image Network Awards	2009	Outstanding Actress Drama Series	Glenn Close	Won	
Writers Guild of America Awards	2007	Television: New Series	Jeremy Doner, Mark Fish, Davey Holmes, Glenn Kessler, Todd A. Kessler, Willie Reale, Adam Stein, Aaron Zelman, Daniel Zelman	Nominated	
