= Get Me a Lawyer =

Pilot episode of Damages

- Damages episode
- Ellen (right) runs through Manhattan, bloody and half-naked.
- Episode no.: Season 1 Episode 1
- Directed by: Allen Coulter
- Written by: Todd A. Kessler; Glenn Kessler; Daniel Zelman
- Original air date: July 24, 2007
- Running time: 55 minutes

Guest appearances
- Tom Aldredge; Robin Thomas; Victor Arnold; Donnie Keshawarz; Marlyne Afflack; Maya Days; Casey Siemaszko; Michael Nouri; Greta Van Susteren; Audrey Moore

Episode chronology
| ← Previous — | Next → "Jesus, Mary, and Joe Cocker" |

"Get Me a Lawyer" (also known as "Pilot") is the pilot episode of the legal drama series Damages, which first aired on July 24, 2007 on FX in the United States. It was written by series creators/executive producers Todd A. Kessler, Glenn Kessler, and Daniel Zelman, and was directed by producer Allen Coulter. In the episode, recent law school graduate Ellen Parsons (Rose Byrne) is recruited to Hewes and Associates, a law firm headed by Patty Hewes (Glenn Close), where she is assigned to the "Frobisher case". Billionaire Arthur Frobisher (Ted Danson) is being sued by his former employees, whom he advised to invest in his company while unloading his own stock, and while Frobisher's attorney Ray Fiske (Željko Ivanek) pleads for a settlement price, Patty insists on taking the case to court.

When the Kesslers and Zelman devised the series, they did not specifically intend for Patty and Ellen to be lawyers, wanting primarily to explore the power structures between two strong women—Patty and her protégée Ellen—and choosing a profession afterwards. Close agreed to play Patty so long as the series was filmed in New York City, where she resides. To prepare for their roles, Close, Byrne and Tate Donovan met with corporate lawyers, while Danson met with the CEOs of Fortune 500 companies. The pilot was filmed in February and FX placed a 13-episode order for the series in March. Its American airing brought in 3.7 million viewers and it was reviewed positively by most critics. It received two Emmy Award nominations for writing and directing and one win for Close for Outstanding Lead Actress in a Drama Series. It was also nominated for an American Cinema Editors Award.

== Plot ==
A young woman steps out of an elevator, bloody and half-naked. She leaves the building and runs down a busy street. She is taken to a police station, where two detectives, Dan Williams (Casey Siemaszko) and Rosario Ortiz (Maya Days), find in her pocket a business card for Hollis M. Nye.

In an extended flashback to six months earlier, the woman is revealed to be Ellen Parsons, a recent law school graduate. She turns down a generous salary from Nye's firm to meet with Patty Hewes, head of Hewes and Associates. Later at a bar, Ellen meets Nye (Philip Bosco), who cautions that Patty is dangerous and has her sign a card reading "I was warned." Ellen finds out that her interview with Patty is on the day of her sister's wedding. She declines the interview but Patty, intrigued to have been turned down, finds Ellen at the wedding and hires her.

Patty is the lead attorney in a high-profile litigation, representing the bankrupted workers of a large company run by Frobisher, who allegedly advised his employees to invest in the company while selling his own stock. Patty insists on taking the case to trial rather than accepting a settlement, but on Ellen's first day it is revealed that the prosecution cannot yet link Frobisher to his stockbroker—though both were in Palm Beach, Florida over the same weekend—and thus cannot disprove that the selling of his stock was not pre-arranged. When Ellen returns home, her boyfriend David Connor (Noah Bean) proposes to her and she accepts.

Frobisher's attorney Ray Fiske visits David's sister Katie (Anastasia Griffith), who is opening a restaurant in which Frobisher is investing, and asks her to sign a confidentiality agreement. Frobisher meets with his former custodian Larry Popler (Victor Arnold), who names a settlement price of $100 million, which Ray returns to Patty. Patty persuades her clients to decline the offer, but Larry mentions a previous agreement to accept any offer of $100 million. Patty suspects that her advisor Tom (Tate Donovan) had known about the agreement and fires him. Katie, meanwhile, thinks that she is being watched, and tells Ellen and David that she had catered a function for Frobisher in Florida and that afterwards he had offered to help her open a restaurant. Ellen realizes that Patty hired her to get to Katie, a potential witness. Though Katie is initially hesitant to testify, she finds her dog Saffron dead in her apartment with a note reading "Quiet" pinned to a wall. Assuming that Frobisher is responsible, she agrees to meet with Patty to help bring Frobisher down. Tom meets with Patty, who had only pretended to fire him, and gives her Saffron's collar, which she throws into the ocean.

Returning to the present, the two detectives seek Nye out and he identifies Ellen. They visit Ellen and David's apartment and find David dead in the bathtub. Ortiz tells Ellen to explain what had happened, and Ellen's only response is "Get me a lawyer."

== Production ==
Brothers Glenn and Todd Kessler decided to work with Daniel Zelman because "we have a third brother, but Daniel is kind of like our fourth brother that we've known for over 20 years." When the Kesslers and Zelman devised the series, they did not specifically intend for Patty and Ellen to be lawyers. They wanted to explore the power structures in two strong women—feeling that the male power dynamics had been seen before—and considered a number of professions, including entertainment and pharmaceuticals, before deciding on law. Zelman said that the writers' main motivation to write about the law "was our interest in power dynamics, the dynamics of power in society. We're very much interested in the ambiguity of it. We're just interested in seeing how far we can push these characters." According to Kessler, "One thing that's crucial is that Patty Hewes is on one end of the spectrum and Ellen Parsons is on the other." The relationship the writers were most interested in showing was that between a mentor and a mentee, which is represented by Patty and her protégée Ellen. Todd Kessler called the real life Enron case "a big part" of the inspiration for Patty's main case involving Arthur Frobisher, though Zelman claims that Enron was not used as a basis in particular: "It was more just the culture of all those corporate scandals at the time. There seemed to be one after the other of them, and we became very interested in sort of the characters who were a part of those scandals."

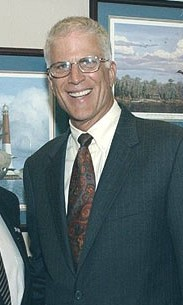
Ted Danson met with powerful CEOs to prepare for his role.

After co-starring on 2004's fourth season of The Shield on cable network FX, Close told network president John Landgraf that she would be open to star in another series, suggesting a spin-off for her Shield character, Captain Monica Rawling. Landgraf pitched Damages to Close, who agreed to play Patty so long as the series was shot in New York City, where she resides. To prepare for her role, Close met New York attorney Mary Jo White and her partner Lorna Scoffield, as well as litigator Patricia Hines, from whom Close learned "some extraordinary things". The producers sought after Byrne to play Ellen, but she was unavailable during the first round of auditions as she was filming 28 Weeks Later. She says the opportunity "came up again, so I went in, auditioned, and got the role". Like Close, Byrne spent time with a female lawyer in New York and read books written by litigators Alan Dershowitz and David DuBois, while Donovan talked to his uncle, a New York corporate lawyer. He visited Manhattan's Centre Street courts, where he "followed the most intense murder trial". Ivanek was so eager to work on the series that he auditioned for two different roles, and was cast as Ray. Todd Kessler said that Danson's 1979 film The Onion Field was "a huge influence on Glenn, Daniel and myself, and that was something that had always stuck in our minds. And when we sought out to cast this role of Arthur Frobisher, Ted kind of came into focus." In preparation for his role, the producers asked Danson to meet with CEOs of Fortune 500 corporations and watch documentaries such as Enron: The Smartest Guys in the Room, which examines the collapse of Enron. They also suggested that Danson meet with Close's acting coach Harold Guskin. The producers said that David and Katie were the hardest characters to cast. Noah Bean, who felt that he gave "an awful first audition" for the role of David, was called in for a second reading as he was waiting for an elevator to leave the building, and was ultimately cast. British actress Anastasia Griffith's agent informed her of the audition for the role of Katie only two hours before it began. When she met the producers, they were initially concerned about a Brit playing an American, especially since Australian Byrne had already signed on. "To put their fears at rest", Griffith addressed the producers in an American accent from beginning to end of the audition. After being cast, Griffith and Byrne visited New York University dialect coach Deborah Hecht to perfect their accents.

The episode was shot in February and edited in March 2007. Filming took place on location at various sites around Manhattan; after the first season had been greenlit, sets were built at New York's Steiner Studios. Byrne said that filming the opening scene on a winter's morning in only underwear and a coat was "very traumatic" and "very hard". The series remained untitled during casting and filming, and was named Damages after FX had greenlit the pilot and placed a 13-episode order for the first season in March.

== Reception ==
As the most-watched basic cable show of the night, "Get Me a Lawyer" drew 3.7 million viewers on its initial commercial-free airing, with a total of 5.1 million including the viewers of repeat airings later in the night. 1.2 million people fell into the target demographic of adults aged 18–49, while 1.5 million fell into the 25–54 age bracket. FX president John Landgraf deemed the pilot's ratings "middling" by the network's standards. The Australian premiere on the Nine Network brought in 999,000 viewers, making Damages the thirteenth most-watched show of the night. In Britain, BBC One's airing of the episode was seen by 1.9 million people with a share of 11%.

Most critics reviewed "Get Me a Lawyer" positively. The New York Times' Alessandra Stanley praised FX for choosing another series that "keep[s] the light focused on the dark side of its main characters". Stanley wrote that "Damages is yet another show that requires viewers to tune in to every episode to follow the plot, but it is the most grown-up thriller in the pack [of serialized drama series]." Tim Goodman of the San Francisco Chronicle wrote that, in the episode, "All the drama is in the writing and the acting." He complimented the "strong cast", stating that "it's Close who makes Damages a series to contend with". Writing for The Age, Robin Oliver called the pilot "terrific-going-on-sensational". She praised Close and Byrne's performances, but also highlighted Danson's role as "a particularly fine piece of casting". Oliver's Age colleague Melinda Houston called Close "delicious – and convincing" as Patty and thought that the script was "fabulous". S. P. Miskowski of the Seattle Post-Intelligencer remarked, "For my money, this is what a 'thriller' is all about." TV Squad's Jonathan Toomey enjoyed the episode's flashbacks, saying that the style of the show "works and it works well". Matt Mitovich claimed in a TV Guide recap of the episode, "What a pilot it was!" He praised the acting from Close, Danson and Byrne, while he felt that "the supporting cast is excellent as well". Stuart Levine, writing for Variety, called the pilot his favorite episode of the first season.

Other critics, however, did not respond well to the episode. Andrew Billen of The Times thought that the episode was "not as stylish, intelligent or classy as it hopes" and "about as subtle as Times Square". He called Close's performance "not remotely credible but impressive in a Norma Desmond way" and labeled Byrne as "particularly unstriking". Brian Lowry gave the pilot a lukewarm review for Variety. He praised the "solid cast" and "smart dialogue", but felt that "the template feels a little too familiar ... moreover, it's fuzzy how long the show's mystery will persist". Entertainment Weekly's Gillian Flynn graded the episode as a C−, criticizing the characters' lack of logic and the "many ludicrous scenes". She thought the storylines to be overcomplicated and called Byrne "bland" and "inexpressive".

"Get Me a Lawyer" received two Primetime Emmy Award nominations: Allen Coulter was nominated for Outstanding Directing for a Drama Series, and Glenn Kessler, Todd A. Kessler, and Daniel Zelman were nominated for Outstanding Writing for a Drama Series. The pilot episode was submitted to the Primetime Emmys judging panel for determining the nominees for Outstanding Drama Series; Damages was nominated but did not win the award. Close chose the episode as her Outstanding Lead Actress in a Drama Series submission; she was nominated and went on to win the award. Editor Malcolm Jamieson was nominated for an American Cinema Editors Award for his work on this episode in the "Best Edited One-Hour TV Series (Commercial Television)" category.
