= Harold Guskin =

American acting coach (1941–2018)

- Born: Harold Saul Guskin; May 25, 1941; New York City
- Died: May 10, 2018 (aged 76); Park Ridge, New Jersey
- Occupations: Actor, acting coach
- Partner: Sandra Jennings

Harold Saul Guskin (May 25, 1941 – May 10, 2018) was an American actor and acting coach. He coached Glenn Close, James Gandolfini and Gabriel Macht.

He also coached BAFTA winning Robert Downey Jr at the beginning of RDJ's career.

== Early life ==
He learned playing the trombone in high school but replaced it with theatre, then he started attending acting classes and did bachelor's degree in drama at Rutgers University, then earned a master's from Indiana University Bloomington.

== Career ==
In 1970, Guskin began teaching at Illinois Wesleyan University in Bloomington, then moved to the New York University Tisch School of the Arts, where he was not happy with academic world. In the 1980 he joined the Public Theater for three years where he did workshops to introduce his acting techniques.

He published a book "How to Stop Acting" (2003) a book about acting techniques.

== Death ==
On May 10, 2018, he died in Park Ridge, New Jersey. His wife reported the cause of death as a pulmonary embolism. He had contracted primary progressive aphasia, a rare form of dementia, over a decade before his death.
