= Glenn Close =

American actress (born 1947)

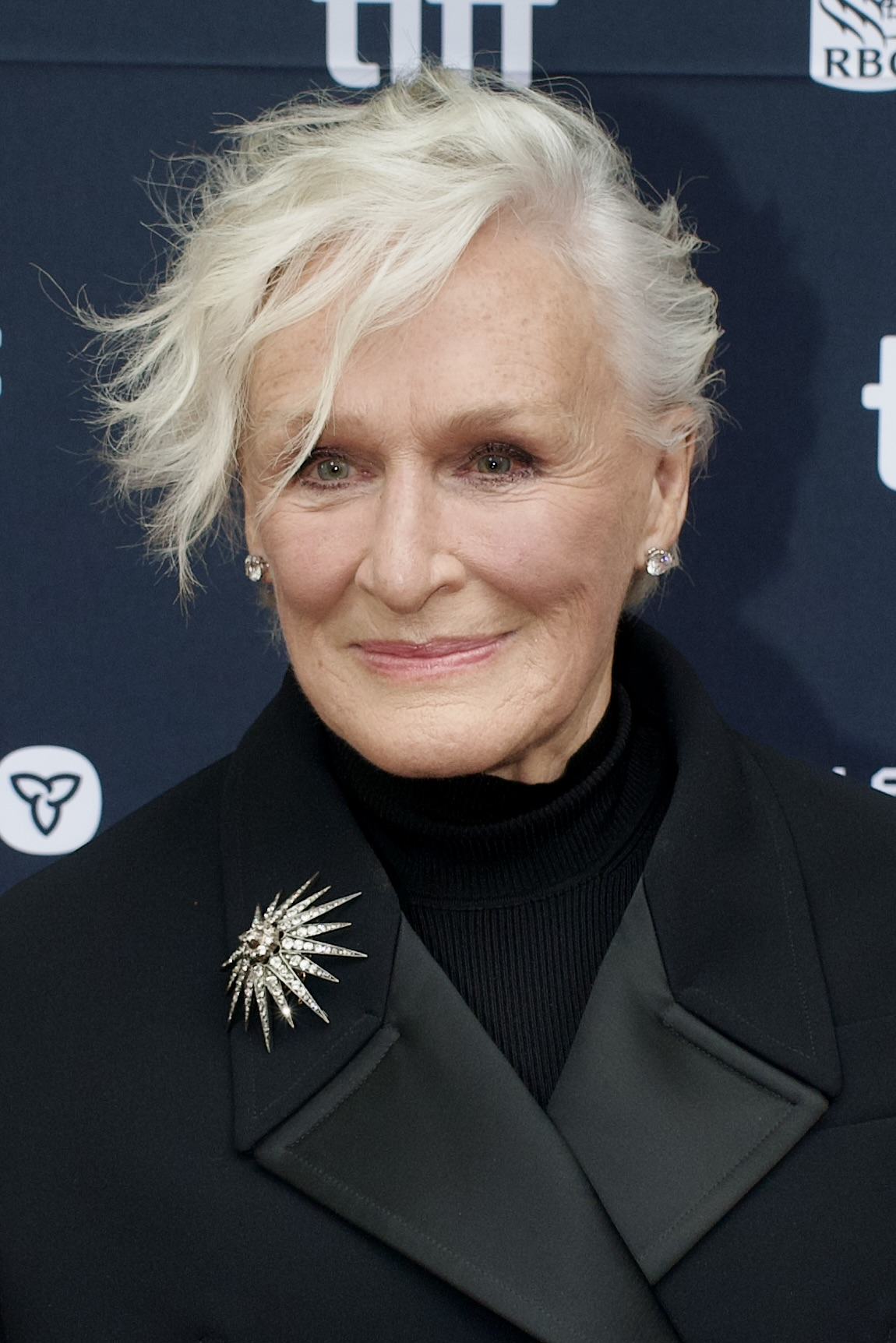
- Close in 2025
- Born: March 19, 1947 (age 79); Greenwich, Connecticut, U.S.
- Education: College of William & Mary (BFA)
- Occupations: Actress; singer
- Years active: 1974–present
- Works: Full list
- Spouses: Cabot Wade (m. 1969; div. 1971); James Marlas (m. 1984; div. 1987); David Shaw (m. 2006; div. 2015)
- Partner: Len Cariou (1979–1983)
- Children: Annie Starke
- Father: William Close
- Awards: Full list

Glenn Close (born March 19, 1947) is an American actress and singer. Regarded as one of the greatest and most versatile actresses of her generation with a career spanning five decades on screen and stage, she has received numerous accolades, including three Primetime Emmy Awards, three Golden Globe Awards, three Tony Awards in addition to nominations for eight Academy Awards, (Note: Tied with Peter O'Toole, Close holds the record as the most nominated actor without a competitive win at the Oscars, though both O'Toole and Close were recipients of Academy Honorary Awards.) three Grammy Awards, two British Academy Film Awards, and a Laurence Olivier Award. She was named by Time as one of the 100 most influential people in the world in 2019, and was the recipient of an Academy Honorary Award in 2026.

Close gained early recognition for her work on the stage, with her Broadway debut in the play Love for Love (1974), before going on to win three Tony Awards, two for Best Actress in a Play for her roles in the plays The Real Thing (1983) and Death and the Maiden (1992), and one for Best Actress in a Musical, the musical Sunset Boulevard (1995). She received her first Academy Award nomination for her film debut in The World According to Garp (1982), and her first Emmy nomination in 1984 for the television film Something About Amelia. Close's career further progressed throughout the 1980s and 1990s with a number of acclaimed film performances, including The Big Chill (1983), The Natural (1984), Fatal Attraction (1987), Dangerous Liaisons (1988), Reversal of Fortune (1990), The Paper (1994), Mars Attacks! (1996), and Air Force One (1997). During this period, she also portrayed Cruella de Vil in 101 Dalmatians (1996) and its 2000 sequel 102 Dalmatians, and voiced Kala in Tarzan (1999).

Close won the Primetime Emmy Award for Outstanding Lead Actress in a Limited Series or Movie for her portrayal of Colonel Margarethe Cammermeyer in Serving in Silence: The Margarethe Cammermeyer Story (1995), followed by two consecutive Primetime Emmy Awards for Outstanding Lead Actress in a Drama Series for playing Patty Hewes in Damages (2007–2012). In film, Close gained continued recognition in the 21st century for her roles in Albert Nobbs (2011), The Wife (2017), Hillbilly Elegy (2020), and Wake Up Dead Man (2025).

Close is the president of Trillium Productions and co-founder of the website FetchDog. She has made political donations in support of Democratic politicians and is vocal on issues such as women's rights, same-sex marriage, and mental health. Married three times, she has one daughter, Annie Starke, from her relationship with producer John Starke.

== Early life and background ==
Glenn Close was born on March 19, 1947, in Greenwich, Connecticut, to socialite Elizabeth Mary Hester "Bettine" (née Moore) and William Taliaferro Close, a doctor who later operated a clinic in the Belgian Congo and served as a personal physician to Congolese dictator Mobutu Sese Seko. She has two sisters, Tina and Jessie, and two brothers, Alexander (nicknamed Sandy) and Tambu Misoki, whom Close's parents adopted while living in Congo. Despite claims stating her birth name is "Glenda Veronica Close", Close has confirmed that her birth name is "Glenn Close".

During her childhood, Close lived with her parents in a stone cottage on her maternal grandfather's estate in Greenwich. She began honing her acting abilities in her early years, "I have no doubt that the days I spent running free in the evocative Connecticut countryside with an unfettered imagination, playing whatever character our games demanded, is one of the reasons that acting has always seemed so natural to me." Although Close has an affluent background, she has stated that her family chose not to participate in WASP society. She would also avoid mentioning her birthplace, the wealthy town Greenwich, whenever asked because she did not want people to think she was a "dilettante who didn't have to work."

When Close was seven years old, her parents joined the Moral Re-Armament (MRA), a movement in which her family was involved for 15 years. During this period, Close's family lived in communal centers. She has described MRA as a "cult" that dictated every aspect of her life, from the clothes that had to be worn to what she was allowed to say. Close also spent time in Switzerland when studying at St. George's School, and attended Rosemary Hall (now Choate Rosemary Hall), graduating in 1965. She traveled for several years in the mid-to-late 1960s with the nonprofit encouragement singing group Up With People. During her time in Up With People, Close organized a small singing group called the Green Glenn Singers, consisting of herself, Kathe Green, Jennie Dorn, and Vee Entwistle. The group's stated mission was "to write and sing songs which would give people a purpose and inspire them to live the way they were meant to live".

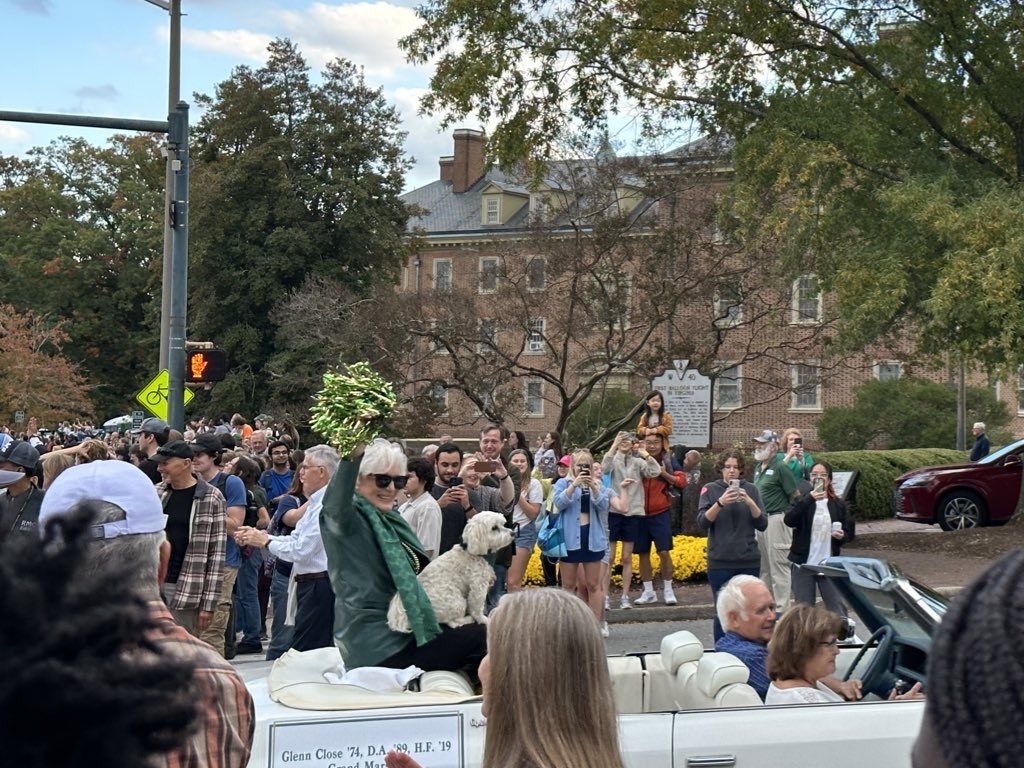
Close (seated with her dog) leading the College of William & Mary's 2023 homecoming parade

When she was 22, Close broke away from MRA. She once stated that her desire to become an actress allowed her to leave the group, adding, "I have long forgiven my parents for any of this. They had their reasons for doing what they did, and I understand them. It had terrible effects on their kids, but that's the way it is. We all try to survive, right? And I think what actually saved me more than anything was my desire to be an actress." She attended The College of William & Mary, double majoring in theater and anthropology. During her senior year of college, Close became inspired to pursue a career in acting after watching an interview of Katharine Hepburn on The Dick Cavett Show. It was in the college's theater department that Close began to train as a serious actor under Howard Scammon, William and Mary's long-time professor of theater. During her years at school in Williamsburg, she also starred in the summer-time outdoor drama, The Common Glory, written by Pulitzer Prize author Paul Green. She was elected to membership in the honor society of Phi Beta Kappa. Through the years, Close has returned to William & Mary to lecture and to visit the theater department.

Through her appearance on the first episode of the seventh season of Finding Your Roots, she came to find out that she is related to Diana, Princess of Wales through her seven times great-grandparents, is also distantly related to fellow actor Clint Eastwood, and that some of her ancestors were slaveholders. She also has a tangential connection to Marjorie Post who was once married to her grandfather, Edward Bennett Close.

== Career ==
=== 1970s: Early work ===
Close started her professional career on the stage in 1974 at age 27. In her senior year of college, she called her school's theater department to be nominated for a series of auditions through the University Resident Theatre Association and TCG. Eventually, she was given a callback and hired for one season to do three plays at the Helen Hayes Theatre, one of those plays being Love for Love directed by Hal Prince. She made her television debut in 1975 with a small role in the anthology series Great Performances. In 1975, Close also appeared as Cordelia in King Lear at the Milwaukee Repertory Theater. In 1976, she played Mary I in the short-lived Broadway musical Rex, with a score by Richard Rodgers and Sheldon Harnick.

From September 1978 to April 1979, Glenn appeared on Broadway in The Crucifer of Blood playing the part of Irene St. Claire, with Paxton Whitehead and Dwight Schultz. In 1979, she filmed the television movies Orphan Train and Too Far to Go. The latter film included Blythe Danner and Michael Moriarty in the cast, and Close played Moriarty's lover. Her last major stage role before beginning her motion picture career was playing Chairy, the female lead in the Broadway musical Barnum, from April 1980 to March 1981.

=== 1980s: Breakthrough and rise to prominence ===
The 1980s proved to be Close's breakthrough in Hollywood. In 1980, director George Roy Hill discovered Close on Broadway and asked her to audition with Robin Williams for a role in The World According to Garp, which would become her first film role, as well as her first Academy Award nominated performance. She played Williams's feminist mother, despite being just four years older. The following year she played Sarah Cooper in The Big Chill, a character that director Lawrence Kasdan said he specifically wrote for her. The movie received positive reviews and was a financial success. Close became the third actor to receive a Tony, Emmy, and Oscar (Academy Award) nomination all in the same calendar year after the release of The Big Chill (also in 1980, she received her first Tony Award nomination for her performance in the musical Barnum).

In 1984, Close was given a part in Robert Redford's baseball drama The Natural, and although it was a small supporting role, she earned a third consecutive Oscar nomination. Close, to this day, credits her nomination to cinematographer Caleb Deschanel, stating "That hat was designed so the sunlight would come through. We waited for a certain time of day, so the sun was shining through the back of the stadium. And he had a lens that muted the people around me. It was an incredibly well thought-out shot. And I honestly think that's the reason I got nominated." Close also starred opposite Robert Duvall in the drama The Stone Boy (1984), a film about a family coping after their youngest child accidentally kills his older brother in a hunting accident. She continued to appear in television films in the following years, beginning with The Elephant Man, and in 1984, she starred in the critically acclaimed drama Something About Amelia, a television film about a family destroyed by sexual abuse. She won her first Tony Award in 1984 for her performance as Annie in Tom Stoppard's The Real Thing, directed by Mike Nichols.

Eventually, Close began to seek different roles to play because she did not want to be typecast as a motherly figure. She starred in the 1985 romantic comedy Maxie, alongside Mandy Patinkin. Close was given favorable reviews and even received her second Golden Globe Award nomination, but the movie was critically panned and under-performed at the box office. In 1985, Close starred in the legal thriller Jagged Edge, opposite Jeff Bridges. Initially, Jane Fonda was attached to the role, but was replaced with Close when she requested changes in the script. Producer Martin Ransohoff was against the casting of Close because he said she was "too ugly" for the part. Close eventually heard about this and said she didn't want Ransohoff on set while she was making her scenes. Director Richard Marquand stood by her side and sent Ransohoff away. Infuriated, Ransohoff went to the studio heads trying to get Close and Marquand fired from the picture. The studio refused, stating they were pleased with their work in the film. Jagged Edge received positive reviews and grossed $40-million on a $15-million budget.

In 1987, Close played the disturbed book editor Alex Forrest in the psychological thriller Fatal Attraction. The film became a huge box-office success, the highest-grossing film worldwide of that year. The film propelled Close to international stardom and the character of Alex Forrest is considered one of her most iconic roles; the phrase "bunny boiler" has even been added to the dictionary, referring to a scene from the movie. During the re-shoot of the ending, Close suffered a concussion from one of the takes when her head smashed against a mirror. After being rushed to the hospital, she discovered, much to her horror, that she was actually a few weeks pregnant with her daughter. Close stated in an interview that, "Fatal Attraction was really the first part that took me away from the Jenny Fields, Sarah Coopers—good, nurturing women roles. I did more preparation for that film than I've ever done." Close received her fourth Oscar nomination for this role, her first in the leading role and also won the People's Choice Award for Favorite Motion Picture Actress.

She played scheming aristocrat Marquise de Merteuil in 1988's period romantic drama Dangerous Liaisons. Close earned stellar reviews for this performance, and received her fifth Oscar nomination and her first BAFTA nomination. Also in 1988, she appeared alongside Keith Carradine in Stones for Ibarra, a television film adapted from the book written by Harriet Doerr and produced by the Hallmark Channel. Close's final film role of the decade was Immediate Family (1989), a drama about a married couple seeking to adopt a child. Producer Lawrence Kasdan had Close star in the film, as he directed her previously in The Big Chill.

=== 1990s: Established actress ===
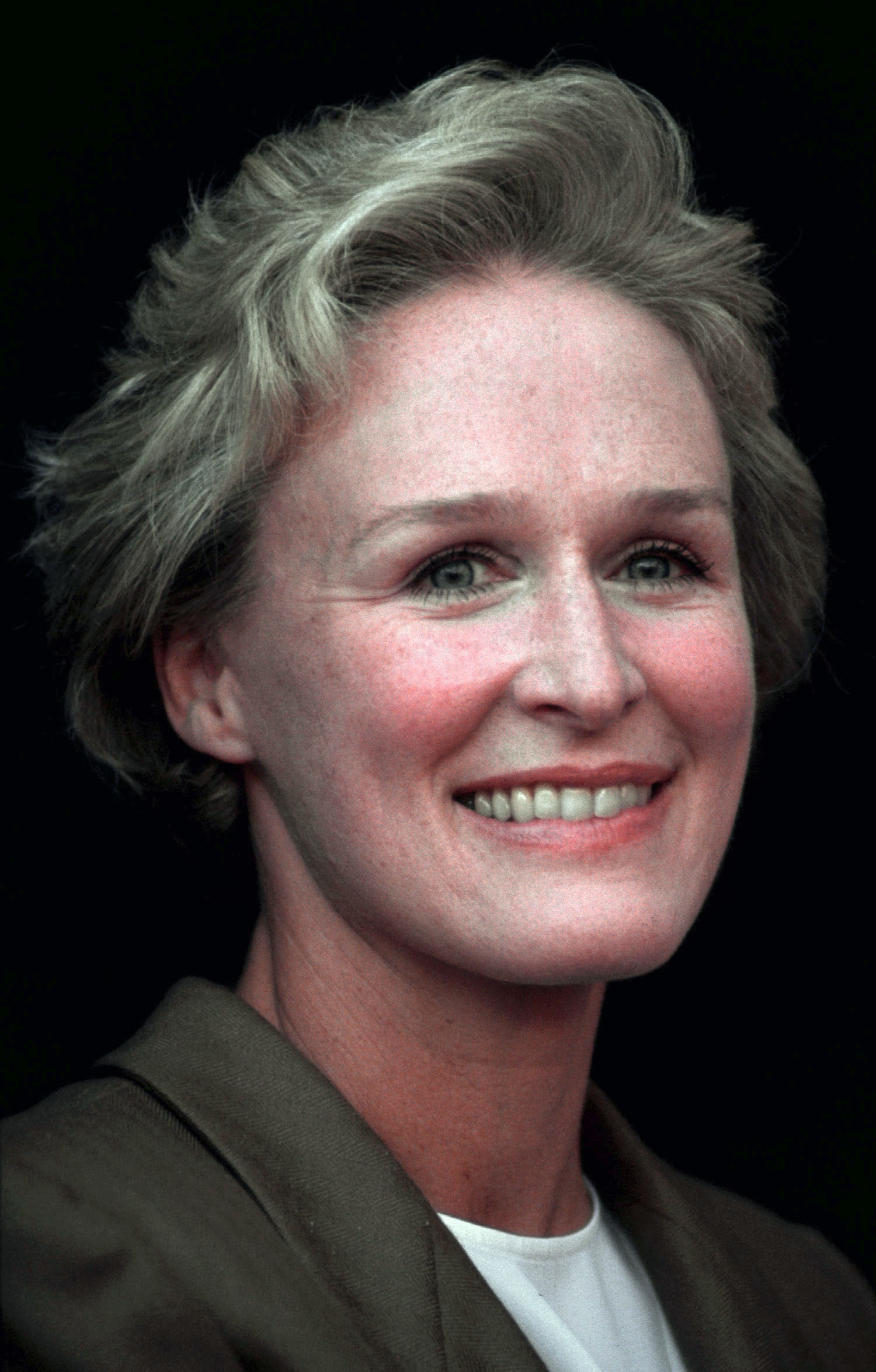
Close at the 1992 Venice Film Festival

In 1990, Close went on to play the role of Sunny von Bülow opposite Jeremy Irons in Reversal of Fortune to critical acclaim. The film drew some controversy since it dealt with the Claus von Bülow murder trial, while the real Sunny von Bülow was still in a vegetative state. Sunny's children publicly criticized the movie. In the same year, Close played Gertrude in Franco Zeffirelli's film adaption of Hamlet. It was the first Shakespeare role that Close had ever attempted on screen (she appeared in 1975 in a stage production of King Lear in Milwaukee). Close would later go on to join the cast of The House of the Spirits, reuniting her with Jeremy Irons. She also had a cameo appearance in Steven Spielberg's Hook (1991) as a pirate. In 1991, she starred in the highly rated Hallmark Hall of Fame television movie Sarah, Plain and Tall, as well as its two sequels.

In 1992, Close starred in Meeting Venus for which she received critical acclaim and won Best Actress (Golden Ciak) at the Venice Film Festival. In the same year, Close became a trustee emeritus of The Sundance Institute. She also portrayed the title subject of the fact-based made-for-TV movie Serving in Silence: The Margarethe Cammermeyer Story in 1995, for which she won her first Primetime Emmy Award. Additionally, she has also provided the voice of Mona Simpson, from The Simpsons, since 1995. Entertainment Weekly named Close one of the 16 best Simpsons guest stars. Close has also hosted Saturday Night Live twice, in 1989 and in 1992. In 1992, she won her second Tony Award for Death and the Maiden.

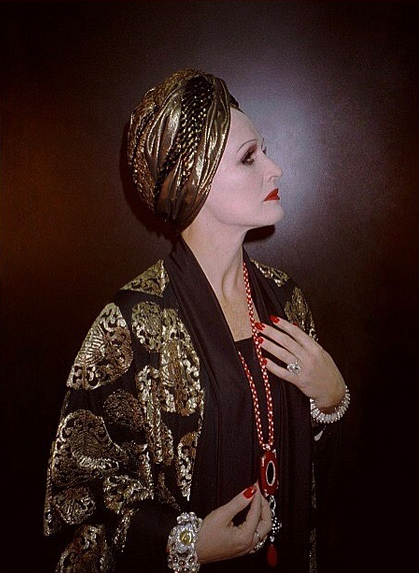
Close as Norma Desmond for the musical Sunset Boulevard in 1995

One of her most notable roles on stage was as the faded film star Norma Desmond in the Andrew Lloyd Webber production of Sunset Boulevard, for which Close won her third Tony Award, playing the role on Broadway in 1993–94. For her role, Close was met with critical acclaim. David Richards of The New York Times wrote in 1994 that "Glenn is giving one of those legendary performances people will be talking about years from now. The actress takes breathtaking risks, venturing so far out on a limb at times that you fear it will snap. It doesn't." She would later re-team with the show's director, Trevor Nunn, in London for his Royal National Theatre revival of A Streetcar Named Desire in 2002.

Close appeared in the newsroom comedy-drama The Paper (1994), directed by her good friend Ron Howard and in 1996, she acted alongside the cast of Tim Burton's alien invasion satire Mars Attacks! (1996), playing First Lady Marsha Dale. That same year, she portrayed Cruella de Vil in Stephen Herek's 101 Dalmatians, a live-action adaptation of Disney's 1967 animated film. Her role as Cruella de Vil was universally praised and earned her a nomination for Golden Globe Award for Best Actress – Motion Picture Comedy or Musical. The film was also a commercial success, grossing $320.6 million in theaters against a $75 million budget. Per Close's contract, she was allowed to keep any costumes from her films. The producers attempted to make copies of Close's wardrobe due to the expensive materials being used, but, to their dismay, she rejected their suggestion and kept the originals. The following year, Close appeared in another box office hit with Air Force One (1997), playing the trustworthy vice president to Harrison Ford's president. Ford stated in an interview that the role of the vice president was already written for a woman and that he personally chose Close for the role after meeting her at a birthday party for then-president Bill Clinton. Close would later star in the war film Paradise Road (1997) as a choir conductor of the women imprisoned by the Japanese in World War II. In 1999, Close provided the voice of Kala in Disney's animated film Tarzan. She later went on to receive great reviews for her comedic role as Camille Dixon in Cookie's Fortune (1999).

=== 2000s: Focus on television ===
Close began to appear in television movies rather than doing theatrical films in the early 2000s. She returned as Cruella de Vil in 102 Dalmatians (2000). Although the film received mixed reviews, it performed well at the box office. Close later filmed The Safety of Objects which premiered in 2001, a movie about four suburban families dealing with maladies. This was Kristen Stewart's first film role, and Close and Stewart would later reunite in the 2015 film Anesthesia. Close starred in Things You Can Tell Just by Looking at Her in the same year, this would be one of many future collaborations with director Rodrigo Garcia. In 2004, she played Claire Wellington, an uptight socialite in the comedy The Stepford Wives opposite Nicole Kidman and Christopher Walken. She provided the voice of the Blue Fairy in the English version of Pinocchio (2002) and Granny in the animated film Hoodwinked (2005). Close continued to do smaller films like Le Divorce (2003) and The Chumscrubber (2005). In 2005, she reunited with director Rodrigo Garcia to do Nine Lives; he would later direct Close in the film Albert Nobbs (2011). In the same year, she starred in the film Heights (2005), an independent drama centered on the lives of five New Yorkers. Close's performance was lauded by critics.

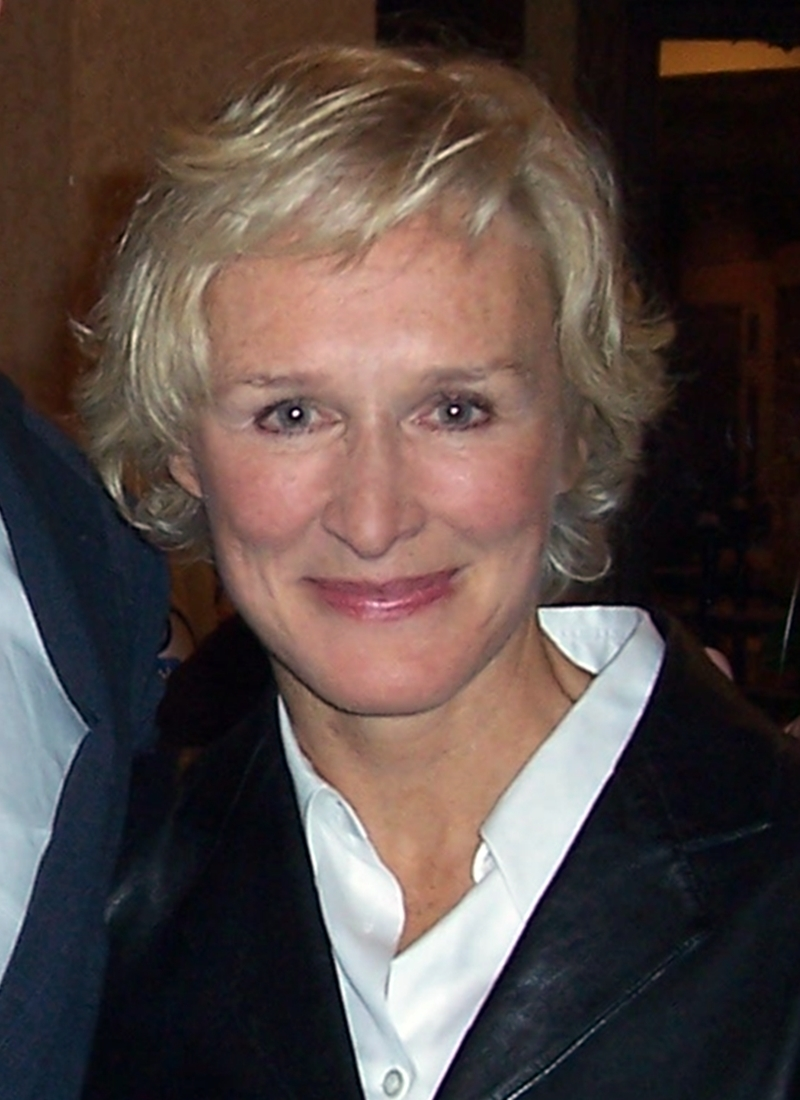
Close at an event for The Shield in 2005

In 2001, she starred in a production of Rodgers and Hammerstein's classic musical South Pacific as Nellie Forbush on ABC. She guest-starred on Will and Grace in 2002, portraying a satirical version of Annie Leibovitz, which earned her an Emmy nomination for Guest Actress in a Comedy Series. In 2003, Close played Eleanor of Aquitaine in the Showtime-produced film The Lion in Winter. Close won a Golden Globe Award and Screen Actors Guild Award for her performance. In 2005, Close joined the FX crime series The Shield, in which she played Monica Rawling, a no-nonsense precinct captain, which became her first TV role in a series. Close stated that she made the right move because television was in a "golden era" and the quality of some programs had already risen to the standards of film. John Landgraf, CEO of FX, stated that network was the "first to bring a female movie star of Glenn Close's stature to television." He also credits her collaboration with the network with promoting roles for women on television, as well as influencing other film actors to switch to the small screen.

In 2007, she appeared in the same film as her previous co-star Meryl Streep in the ensemble drama Evening. This would be Close's final theatrical film role of the decade, since she began to star in her own television series, Damages (2007). Close was asked about her contributions to independent films, to which she responded "I love the casts that gather around a good piece of writing certainly not for the money but because it is good and challenging. Sometimes I've taken a role for one scene that I thought was phenomenal. Also my presence can help them get money, so it's I think a way for me to give back." Shortly after her stint on The Shield, Close was approached by FX executives who pitched a television series for her to star in. Also in 2007, Close began a five-season run playing the ruthless and brilliant lawyer Patty Hewes on Damages. Her portrayal of this character was met with rave reviews and a plethora of award nominations, in addition she went on to win two consecutive Emmy Awards for Outstanding Lead Actress in a Drama Series. Close's win also made her the first Best Actress winner in a drama series at the Emmy's for a cable show. Throughout the show's run, she became one of the highest-paid actresses on cable, earning $200,000 per episode. Close stated that her role of Patty Hewes was the role of her life. She also kept in contact with her co-star Rose Byrne, and the two have become friends. After the series ended, Close stated that she would not return to television in a regular role, but that she was open to do a miniseries or guest spot. In 2008, Close performed at Carnegie Hall, narrating the violin concerto The Runaway Bunny, a concerto for reader, violin and orchestra, composed and conducted by Glen Roven.

=== 2010s: Return to film and stage ===
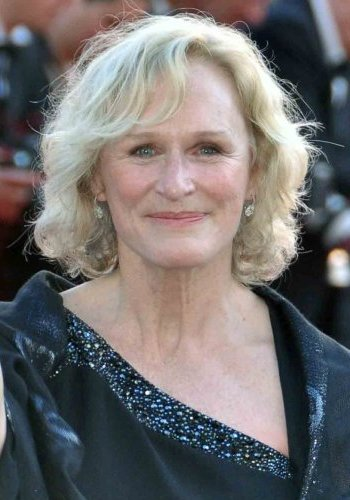
Close at the 2010 Cannes Film Festival

In December 2010, Close began filming Albert Nobbs in Dublin. She had previously won an Obie in 1982 for her role in the play on stage. She had been working on the project, in which she appeared alongside 101 Dalmatians co-star Mark Williams, for almost twenty years, and aside from starring in it, she co-wrote the script and produced the film. Close stated it became more important for her to make the film in order to stimulate discussion on transgender issues, commenting, "There came a point where I asked, 'Am I willing to live the rest of my life having given up on this?' And I said, 'No I won't.' Some people will change their point of view, and those who are either too old, or too blinkered, to accept the beauty of difference will just have to 'die off'." In the film, Close played the title role of Albert Nobbs, a woman living as a man in 19th century Ireland after being sexually assaulted as a young girl.

While the film overall received mixed reviews, Close's performance received critical acclaim, as it was noted for being the most subtle and introverted of her career to that point and a departure from her previous roles. When asked during the film's awards campaign about the fact of not having an Oscar, Close said: "I remember being astounded that I met some people who were really kind of almost hyper-ventilating as to whether they were going to win or not, and I have never understood that. Because if you just do the simple math, the amount of people who are in our two unions, the amount of people who in our profession are out of work at any given time, the amount of movies that are made every year, and then you're one of five [nominees]. How could you possibly think of yourself as a loser?"

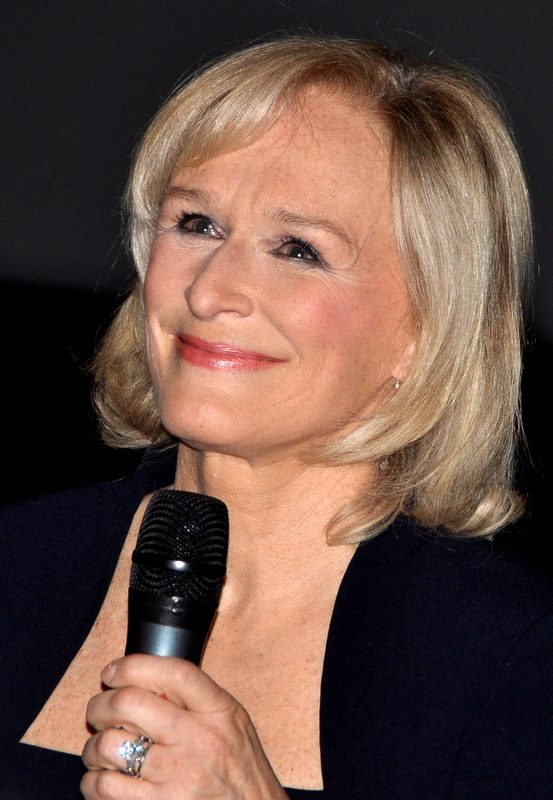
Close at the French premiere of Albert Nobbs in 2012

She provided the voice of The Giant in the Summer 2012 production of the musical Into the Woods at the Delacorte Theater in Central Park. The production also featured Amy Adams as The Baker's Wife and Donna Murphy as The Witch. In 2014, she starred in a production of the Pirates of Penzance for the Public Theater in New York, playing the role of Ruth. This production featured Kevin Kline, Martin Short and Anika Noni Rose. In October 2014, Close returned to Broadway in the starring role of Agnes in Pam MacKinnon's revival of Edward Albee's A Delicate Balance at the John Golden Theatre. Her co-stars were John Lithgow as Tobias, Martha Plimpton as Julia and Lindsay Duncan as Claire. The production grossed $884,596 over eight preview performances during the week ending October 25, setting a new house record at the Golden Theatre. The production received mixed reviews, although the cast was praised. After her television series Damages ended, Close returned to film in 2014, in which she played Irani Rael / Nova Prime in the Marvel Cinematic Universe film Guardians of the Galaxy, directed by James Gunn. She also appeared in the independent movies 5 to 7 (2014) and Low Down (2014). In 2015, Close made a cameo on Louis C.K.'s Louie on FX, in the season five episode "Sleepover" alongside John Lithgow, Michael Cera, and Matthew Broderick.

In 2016, she appeared in The Great Gilly Hopkins and starred in the British horror drama The Girl with All the Gifts (2016) as Dr. Caldwell, a scientist researching a cure to save humanity. In April 2016, she returned as Norma Desmond in the musical Sunset Boulevard in an English National Opera production in London. Close was met with rave reviews after returning to this same role twenty-three years later. Both The Times and The Daily Telegraph gave the production five stars and praised her performance. During the production Close was forced to cancel three shows due to a chest infection. She was hospitalized but later recovered and finished the remaining shows. Close won the Evening Standard Theatre Award for Best Musical Performance, and was nominated for her first Olivier Award for Best Actress in a Musical. That same year, she was inducted into American Theater Hall of Fame for her work on the stage.

The ENO London production of Sunset Boulevard transferred to the Palace Theatre on Broadway, with Close reprising her role. It opened on February 9, 2017, in a limited run, selling tickets through June 25, 2017. The production featured a 40-piece orchestra, the largest in Broadway history. Close in particular was lauded by critics for her new incarnation of Norma Desmond. As The New York Times called it "one of the great stage performances of this century." Variety, Parade, The Guardian and Entertainment Weekly also gave the new production positive reviews. That same year, Close starred in a half hour comedy pilot for Amazon, titled Sea Oak. The pilot premiered online with viewers voting to choose if it wanted Amazon to produce the series. Although it received favorable reviews it was not picked up. Also in 2017, she was honored with the Lifetime Achievement Award at the Theatre World Awards. In 2017, Close appeared alongside Noomi Rapace and Willem Dafoe in What Happened to Monday, a science fiction thriller produced by Netflix. Also that year, she was reunited with actors John Malkovich (her co-star in Dangerous Liaisons) and Patrick Stewart (co-star in The Lion in Winter) in the romantic comedy The Wilde Wedding, and co-starred in Crooked House, a film adaptation of the novel by Agatha Christie.

Close garnered widespread critical acclaim for her performance in the 2018 drama The Wife, which had first premiered at the 2017 Toronto International Film Festival. An adaptation of Meg Wolitzer's novel of the same name, the film stars Close as Joan Castleman, who questions her life choices as she travels with her husband to Stockholm, where he is set to receive the Nobel Prize in Literature. The film also features Close's daughter, Annie Starke, as a younger version of Castleman. Close won the Golden Globe Award for Best Actress in a Motion Picture – Drama, the Screen Actors Guild Award for Outstanding Performance by a Female Actor in a Leading Role, and the Critics' Choice Movie Award for Best Actress. She received her seventh Academy Award nomination, her fourth nomination in the Best Actress category, which has made her the most nominated actress without a win. She was widely considered to be the frontrunner to win the Oscar—which would be the first of her career—but ultimately lost to Olivia Colman for The Favourite. In addition, Close received a nomination, her second overall, for the BAFTA Award for Best Actress in a Leading Role, which she also lost to Colman. Also in 2018, Close made a return to the stage, where, from September to December, she featured in the Off-Broadway play, Mother of the Maid, at the Public Theater in New York City.

=== 2020s: Continued film work and further acclaim ===
In 2020, Close starred in Netflix's film adaptation of Hillbilly Elegy, reuniting with Ron Howard and starring alongside Amy Adams. Close played the Mamaw of future Vice President JD Vance. While the film, which was released for streaming on Netflix on November 24, 2020, received generally negative critical reviews, Close received acclaim for her performance. Richard Roeper praised Close for her "masterful, screen-commanding, pitch-perfect performance", while Peter Travers at ABC News called her "simply sensational" and Owen Gleiberman at Variety wrote that "as long as Close is acting up an award-worthy storm (her performance is actually quite meticulous), Hillbilly Elegy is never less than alive". For the role, she received the San Francisco International Film Festival's Award for Acting along with Academy Award, Golden Globe, and SAG Award nominations for Best Supporting Actress. Close also received a Razzie Award nomination for Worst Supporting Actress for Hillbilly Elegy, making her the third performer—after James Coco for Only When I Laugh and Amy Irving for Yentl—to receive both an Oscar nomination and a Razzie nomination for the same performance.

Also in 2020, Close co-starred with Mila Kunis in the drama Four Good Days, directed by Rodrigo García and presented at the Sundance Film Festival. In 2021, Close served as an executive producer alongside Emma Stone for Cruella, a Disney live-action spin-off/prequel of One Hundred and One Dalmatians, directed by Craig Gillespie. Stone plays the younger version of Cruella de Vil (the titular character whom Close portrayed in the 1996 live-action adaptation and its 2000 sequel). The same year, Close appeared opposite Mahershala Ali in the Apple TV+ drama film Swan Song. In 2022, she starred in season two of the Apple TV+ thriller series Tehran. Close learned Persian for her role in Tehran. She also portrayed former Harper's Bazaar editor Carmel Snow in the Apple TV+ series The New Look, reuniting her with Damages creator Todd A. Kessler.

In 2022, it was announced that Close would star alongside Andra Day and Mo'Nique in the exorcism drama The Deliverance directed by Lee Daniels for Netflix. The film was released in August 2024. She also stars alongside Josh Brolin and Peter Dinklage in the Amazon MGM Studios film Brothers, which was released theatrically on October 10, 2024.

In March 2023, it was announced that Close would star in the upcoming film The Summer Book, based on the novel by Tove Jansson. The film, directed by Charlie McDowell, was released in 2024.

Close was cast alongside Jamie Foxx, Cameron Diaz, and Kyle Chandler in the action-comedy Back in Action, for Netflix. The film was released on Netflix globally on January 17, 2025.

Close starred as devout church lady Martha Delacroix of Wake Up Dead Man (2025), the sequel to Knives Out (2019) and Glass Onion: A Knives Out Mystery (2022). Other cast members for the film include Daniel Craig, Jeremy Renner, Andrew Scott, Cailee Spaeny, Josh O'Connor, and Kerry Washington. During filming, Close's participation in the filming, which by that point in time had only occurred for two days, was delayed, with Close revealing she got "really hit hard" with both COVID-19 and respiratory syncytial virus (RSV). Wake Up Dead Man was released on Netflix on December 12, 2025 to highly positive reviews.

In May 2026, as part of the TCM Classic Film Festival, Close was honored with a Hand & Footprint Ceremony at the TCL Chinese Theatre in Hollywood. She would also present Dangerous Liaisons (1988) at the festival.

In October 2025, Close was reported to have joined the cast of Javier Calvo and Javier Ambrossi's drama film La bola negra, which premiered at the 2026 Cannes Film Festival. She showed interest in the filmmakers after watching the miniseries La mesías, and they find her a role originally devised to be played by a man in the film. She set as a condition to perform in Spanish, and subsequently learn how to deliver her Spanish-language lines during the filming of The Hunger Games: Sunrise on the Reaping with help from an Instituto Cervantes teacher. Her role was Isabelle Durand, an American scholar devoted to Lorquian research.

==== Upcoming projects ====
Close is set to reprise her stage role of Norma Desmond in a film adaptation of the musical Sunset Boulevard, though the film remains in development. In May 2024, it was announced that Close was reuniting with her Reversal of Fortune costar Jeremy Irons in the upcoming Simon Curtis-directed retirement home comedy Encores, with Henry Winkler and Don Johnson also co-starring. Close is also attached to star alongside Melissa McCarthy in a remake of the 2004 Argentine film Cama adentro to be directed by Pamela Adlon.

In June 2025, it was announced that Close would be undertaking the role of Drusilla Sickle in the upcoming film adaptation of The Hunger Games: Sunrise on the Reaping. Sunrise on the Reaping is set to release on November 20, 2026.

In August 2025, it was announced that Close would star in the six-part Channel 4 British crime drama Up to No Good, based on the short story collections "An Elderly Lady Is Up to No Good" and "An Elderly Lady Must Not Be Crossed" by Swedish crime writer Helene Tursten.

== Reception, acting style, and legacy ==
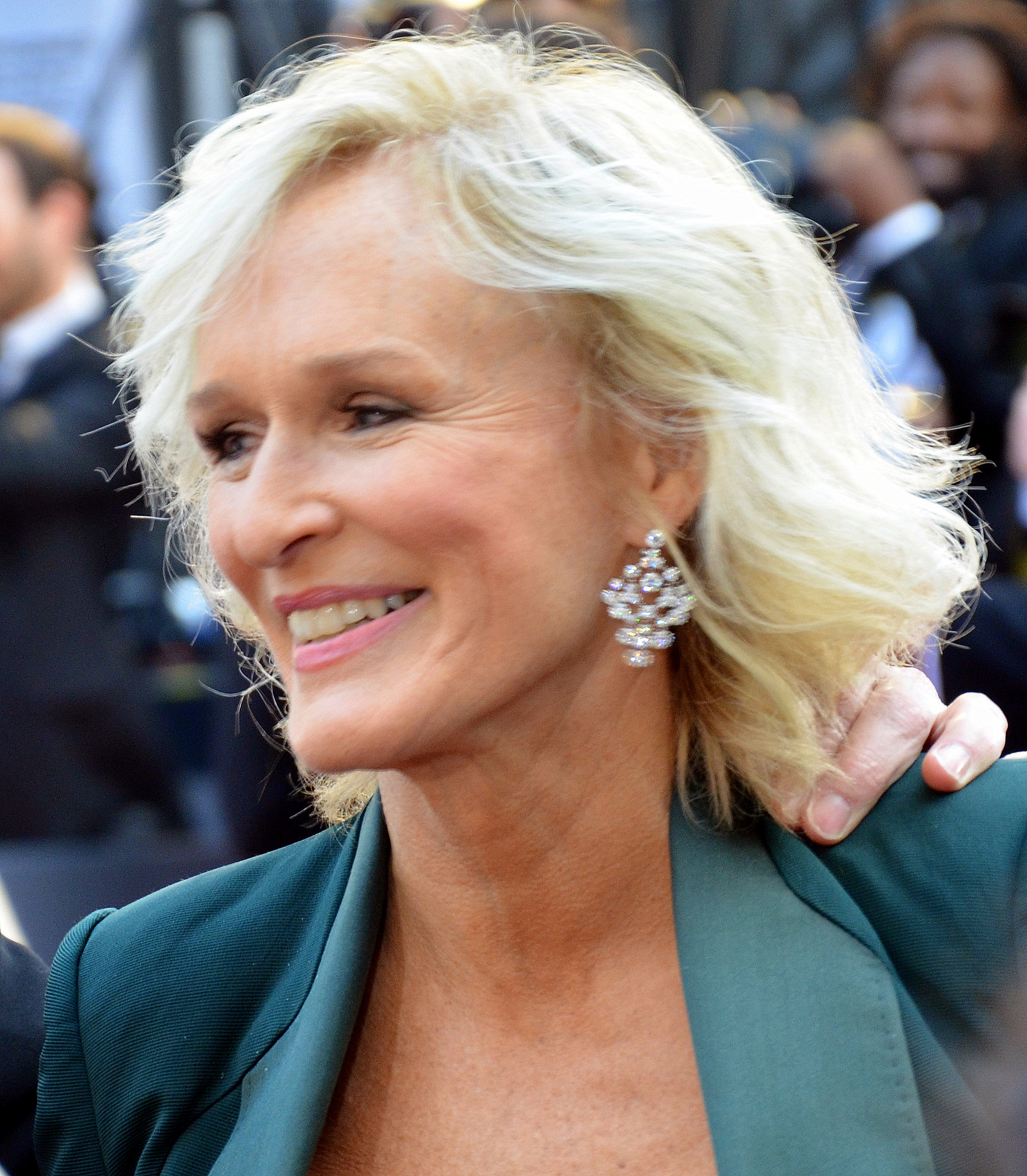
Close at the 84th Academy Awards in 2012

Close is regarded as an extraordinarily versatile actress with an immersive acting style and a considerable range. Vanity Fair remarked how Close is "long considered one of the great actresses of our time." James Lipton described her as an actor who "can find an outstanding number of layers in a role or a single moment; she is a supple actor who performs subtle feats." Close was also professionally trained by acting coach Harold Guskin, who also mentored Kevin Kline, Bridget Fonda, and James Gandolfini. Working with Guskin, Close learned several important lessons, which she said she's applied to her career as well as her life. One such lesson, she claims, was to "read the lines off the page" and remembering to breathe. Close states, "You have to maintain a certain openness, and if you don't maintain that, you lose something vital as an actor. It's how we're wired, and it's not a bad thing." Close says that she went to every rehearsal in order to master her acting skills.

"I love the chemistry that can be created onstage between the actors and the audience. It's molecular even, the energies that can go back and forth. I started in theater, and when I first went into movies, I felt that my energy was going to blow out the camera."

— Close on acting

On method acting, Close claims that while she found it an interesting technique, it was not her preferred style. Although Close does extensive research and preparation for her roles, she also relies less on the technicality of a performance saying, "Good acting I think is like being a magician, in that you make people believe; because it's only when they believe that they are moved. And I want people to get emotionally involved. I think technique is important but it isn't everything. You can have a great technical actor who'll leave people cold. That's not my idea of great acting. As audience, I don't want to be aware of acting." Longtime collaborator and playwright Christopher Hampton describes Close as an actress who can very easily convey "a sense of strength and intelligence." Hampton worked on Sunset Boulevard and the stage production of Dangerous Liaisons, later casting Close in the movie version of the latter production. "Glenn is often described as having a glacial or distant quality about her, but in person she's the absolute opposite: warm and intimate," says actor Iain Glen, who co-starred with her in the 2002 stage production of A Streetcar Named Desire. "She was able to bring strength to the role, she was able to completely access that vulnerability. There was a real softness to her."

However, Close is consistently praised for her roles as the villain or antagonist in her performances. Her character in Fatal Attraction was ranked number 7 on AFI's 100 years...100 heroes and villains list. Regarding her role in the series Damages, The New York Times remarked, "There is no actor dead or alive as scary as a smiling Glenn Close." Journalist Christopher Hooton also praised her, saying, "Christopher Walken, Glenn Close, Al Pacino, and many others have a surprising danger in them. They're a little scary to be around, because you feel they might jump you or blow up at you at any time. They are ticking time bombs." Film historian Cari Beauchamp has stated, "When you look at the top 10 actresses of the past 80 years, since sound came in, first you have Bette Davis, Katharine Hepburn and Meryl Streep – but I think Glenn Close is definitely in that list. It's a combination of her guts, in the roles she chooses, and her perseverance. We're talking about 30 years of nominated performances."

On January 12, 2009, Close was honored with a star on the Hollywood Walk of Fame at 7000 Hollywood Boulevard, in front of the Roosevelt Hotel. As of 2018, films featuring Close have grossed over $1.3 billion in North America. She is also regarded as a gay icon, after having played numerous campy roles on screen and stage. She was named one of the most influential people in the world by Time magazine in 2019.

In 1989, Close was the commencement speaker at William & Mary and received an honorary doctor of arts degree. In 2023, she returned to the college to serve as the grand marshal of their annual homecoming event. She also helped dedicate William & Mary's newly renovated Phi Beta Kappa Memorial Hall, whose main stage theater was named the Glenn Close Theatre in her honor. It was announced in 2026 that she was selected to receive the Academy Honorary Award for Lifetime Achievement.

== Personal life ==
=== Relationships and family ===
Close has been married three times, with each marriage ending in divorce. Her first marriage at age 22 — which Close has described as "kind of an arranged marriage" — ended before she attended college. This marriage (from 1969 to 1971) was to Cabot Wade, a guitarist and songwriter with whom she had performed during her time at Up with People. From 1979 to 1983, she lived with actor Len Cariou. She was married to grocery heir James Marlas from 1984 to 1987. Later, Close began a relationship with producer John Starke, whom she had met on the set of The World According to Garp. Their daughter, Annie Starke, was born in 1988 and is an actress. Close and Starke separated in 1991. In 1991, Close had a five-month relationship with Woody Harrelson. In 1995, Close was engaged to carpenter Steve Beers, who had worked on Sunset Boulevard; the two never married, and their relationship ended in 1999. In February 2006, Close married executive and venture capitalist David Evans Shaw in Maine, but they divorced in August 2015. Her first grandchild was born in February 2025.

=== Business ventures and assets ===
As of 2016, Close primarily resides in Bedford Hills, New York, and also owns a condo in the West Village. She also owns properties in Wellington, Florida, and Bozeman, Montana. In the early 1990s she owned a coffee shop in Bozeman but sold it in 2006. In 2011 Close sold her apartment in The Beresford for $10.2 million. She also runs a 1,000-acre (400 ha) ranch in Wyoming.

Close is the president of Trillium Productions Inc. Her company has produced films like Albert Nobbs, Sarah, Plain and Tall, and South Pacific. With Barbra Streisand she produced the TV film Serving in Silence (1995), for which both were nominated for an Emmy for Outstanding Television Movie.

In 2007 she co-founded FetchDog, a dog accessories catalog and Internet site. Part of her work was publishing blogs in which she interviewed other celebrities about their relationships with their dogs. She sold the business in 2012.

=== Interests and views ===
Close was born into a Democratic family. Her political donations have mostly been made in support of Democratic politicians, including Hillary Clinton, Howard Dean, John Edwards, Angus King, and Barack Obama. Close also spoke at the 2004 Democratic National Convention. She voted for Obama in the 2008 presidential election and attended his inauguration. In a 2016 interview with Andrew Marr for the BBC, Close criticized then-presidential candidate Donald Trump, calling his campaign "terribly frightening." She reiterated her sentiments about Trump in 2017, stating that "he doesn't stand for anything I believe in."

Close kept all of her costumes after completing films and rented them out to exhibits. She lent one of the dresses she wore in Dangerous Liaisons to Madonna for her 1990 VMA performance of "Vogue". However, in 2017, she donated her entire costume collection to Indiana University Bloomington.

Close is a New York Mets fan, and has sung the national anthem at Shea Stadium and Citi Field numerous times since 1986.

Due to her upbringing, Close has stated that she is a spiritual but irreligious person.

== Activism ==
=== Philanthropy ===
Close has campaigned for several issues such as women's rights, same-sex marriage, and mental health. In 1989 she attended pro-choice marches in Washington, D.C., with Gloria Steinem and Jane Fonda. In 1998, Close was a part of a star-studded cast that performed The Vagina Monologues at a benefit. It raised $250,000 in a single evening with proceeds going to the effort to stop violence against women. She was honored with a GLAAD Media Award in 2002 for promoting equal rights among the LGBT community. She volunteered and produced a documentary for "Puppies Behind Bars", an organization that provides service dogs for wounded war veterans.

Close is also a trustee of The Wildlife Conservation Society and volunteers at Fountain House in New York City, a facility dedicated to the recovery of those suffering from mental illness. She is a founding member of the Panthera Conservation Advisory Committee. Panthera is an international nonprofit whose sole mission is conservation of the world's 36 species of wild cats. Close has also been a longtime supporter of late friend Christopher Reeve's foundation. She is also a member of the CuriosityStream Advisory Board.

=== Mental health initiatives ===
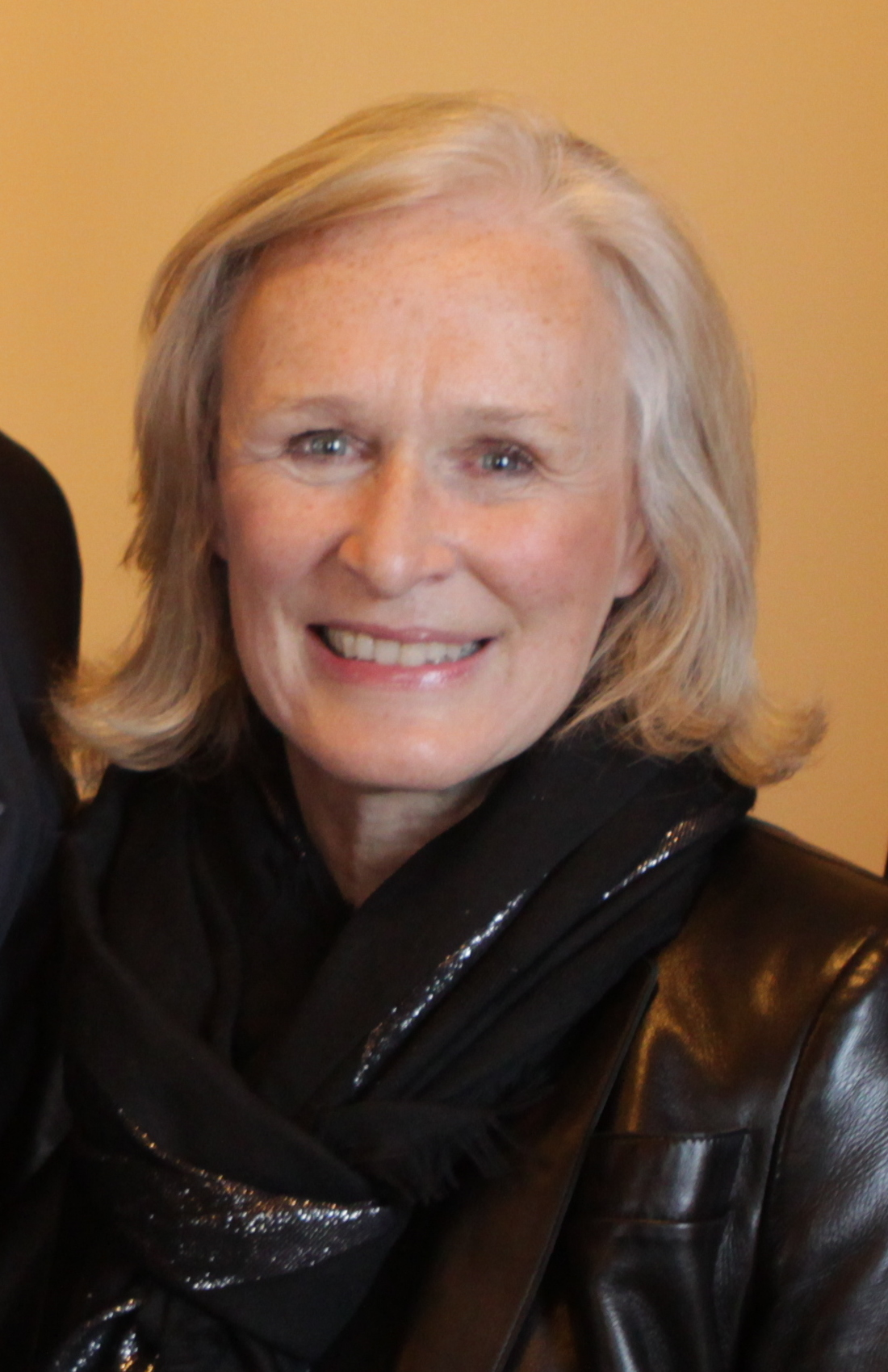
Close attending a mental health advocacy meeting at the office of U.S. Senator Debbie Stabenow in 2013

Close was a founder and is chairperson of Bring Change to Mind, a US campaign to eradicate the stigma and discrimination surrounding mental illness, supporting her sister Jessie who has bipolar disorder. She contributed chapters to her sister's 2015 book about mental illness, Resilience: Two Sisters and a Story of Mental Illness. In 2010, Close announced to the public that she had her DNA sequenced in order to publicize her family's history of mental illness. During the month of July 2013, Close put over 380 designer items up for auction on eBay from the wardrobe of her Damages character Patty Hewes. All proceeds were raised to go to her charity Bring Change to Mind. Close had director and friend Ron Howard direct the foundation's first PSA. John Mayer also lent his song "Say" for the advert.

In 2013, Close delivered an address at the White House urging passage of the Excellence in Mental-Health Act, which was written to expand treatment for the mentally ill and to provide access to mental-health services. The bill was signed into law by President Barack Obama in April 2014, and will provide $1.1 billion in funding to help strengthen the mental-health-care system in the US. She was awarded the WebMD Health Hero award in 2015 for her contributions to mental-health initiatives. On June 16, 2016, Close donated $75,000 to the Mental-Health Association of Central Florida in order to fund counseling and other assistance to victims of the Orlando nightclub shooting. She frequently promotes her charitable causes on her Instagram account.

== Acting credits and awards ==
She is one of the few performers to be nominated for the Triple Crown of Acting and EGOT (Emmy, Grammy, Oscar, Tony). Among her numerous accolades for her acting work, Close has earned three Primetime Emmy Awards, three Golden Globe Awards, two Screen Actors Guild Awards, and three Tony Awards as well as nominations for eight Academy Awards, two BAFTA Awards, three Grammy Awards, and a Laurence Olivier Award. In 2026, she was announced as the recipient of an Academy Honorary Award.

Over her distinguished career she has been recognized by the Academy of Motion Picture Arts and Sciences for the following performances:

- 55th Academy Awards: Best Actress in a Supporting Role, nomination, for The World According to Garp (1982)
- 56th Academy Awards: Best Actress in a Supporting Role, nomination, for The Big Chill (1983)
- 57th Academy Awards: Best Actress in a Supporting Role, nomination, for The Natural (1984)
- 60th Academy Awards: Best Actress in a Leading Role, nomination, for Fatal Attraction (1987)
- 61st Academy Awards: Best Actress in a Leading Role, nomination, for Dangerous Liaisons (1988)
- 84th Academy Awards: Best Actress in a Leading Role, nomination, for Albert Nobbs (2011)
- 91st Academy Awards: Best Actress in a Leading Role, nomination, for The Wife (2018)
- 93rd Academy Awards: Best Actress in a Supporting Role, nomination, for Hillbilly Elegy (2020)
