= Serving in Silence: The Margarethe Cammermeyer Story =

1995 American television film

- Genre: Biography; Drama
- Written by: Alison Cross
- Directed by: Jeff Bleckner
- Starring: Glenn Close; Judy Davis; Jan Rubeš; Wendy Makkena; Susan Barnes
- Theme music composer: David Shire
- Country of origin: United States
- Original language: English

Production
- Executive producers: Glenn Close; Cis Corman; Neil Meron; Barbra Streisand; Craig Zadan
- Producer: Richard Heus
- Production location: Vancouver
- Cinematography: Glen MacPherson
- Editor: Geoffrey Rowland
- Running time: 91 minutes
- Production companies: Barwood Films; Storyline Productions; Trillium Productions; TriStar Television

Original release
- Network: NBC
- Release: February 6, 1995

Serving in Silence: The Margarethe Cammermeyer Story is a 1995 American television film directed by Jeff Bleckner. It aired on NBC on February 6, 1995, and stars Glenn Close, Judy Davis, Jan Rubeš, and Wendy Makkena. The film won several awards in 1995, such as three Primetime Emmy Awards and a Peabody Award, and later received a GLAAD Media Award in 1996.

== Plot summary ==
The film recounts the events in the life of Colonel Margarethe Cammermeyer which led to her retirement from the Washington National Guard under the U.S. military's gay exclusion policy. It begins in 1988, when Cammermeyer, a decorated nurse and officer, meets painter Diane Divelbess and accepts her lesbian identity. After she discloses this during a security clearance interview, the Army starts discharge proceedings. The film shows her legal challenge and the support she receives from family and colleagues under the pre‑"Don’t Ask, Don’t Tell" policy.

== Cast and crew ==
Name	Role/Credit
Glenn Close	as Colonel Margarethe Cammermeyer / Executive producer
Judy Davis	as Diane Divelbess
Jan Rubeš	as Far
Wendy Makkena	as Mary Newcombe
Susan Barnes	as Captain Kern
Eric Dane	as Matt
Ryan Reynolds	as Andy
Molly Parker	as Lynette
Jim Byrnes	as Vet
Alison Cross	Writer
Jeff Bleckner	Director
David Shire	Theme music composer
Glen MacPherson	Cinematography
Geoffrey Rowland	Editor
Richard Heus	Producer
Cis Corman	Executive producer
Neil Meron	Executive producer
Barbra Streisand	Executive producer
Craig Zadan	Executive producer

== Background ==
In 1989, Army nurse Margarethe Cammermeyer disclosed her homosexuality during a security clearance interview and was discharged under military regulations. She became the highest‑ranking officer removed for sexual orientation. In 1993, President Bill Clinton introduced the "don't ask, don't tell" policy, and in 1994 a federal judge in Seattle ordered her reinstatement. Her case and its public attention led to the production of the television film.

== Production ==
The film was produced in 1995 for NBC by Barbra Streisand in her television producing debut, with Glenn Close, Cis Corman, Neil Meron, and Craig Zadan as executive producers. Alison Cross wrote the script after meeting Cammermeyer and her family in Seattle, and Jeff Bleckner directed. Filming took place in Vancouver, with Cammermeyer visiting the set to advise Close on military detail.

== Release ==
Serving in Silence: The Margarethe Cammermeyer Story premiered on NBC on February 6, 1995.

== Reception ==
Howard Rosenberg of the Los Angeles Times called the film "tedious" and lacking dramatic tension, while reader Dave Hutchinson, in a letter to the editor, noted Glenn Close’s performance and described Cammermeyer as a role model rather than a stereotype.

The New York Times critic John J. O'Connor wrote that, despite the limits of the television movie format, Serving in Silence featured strong performances by Glenn Close and Judy Davis. He described Close’s performance as showing "unwavering integrity" and Davis as giving Diane a "hard‑as‑nails vulnerability."

Jonathan Taylor of Variety described Serving in Silence as an issue‑oriented television movie that, despite strong lead performances by Glenn Close and Judy Davis, was "safe" and "staid" and lacked passion.

== Legacy ==
Margarethe Cammermeyer, according to The Seattle Times, earned a Ph.D. in nursing from the University of Washington in 1991, serves on Whidbey’s hospital commission, and was inducted into the Washington State Nurses’ Association Hall of Fame in 2014.

== Source material ==
The film is based on Cammermeyer’s memoir Serving in Silence (Viking Books, 1994), co‑written with Chris Fisher. Publishers Weekly described it as "one of the finest military coming‑out books published so far." ISBN 978-0-670-85167-6.

== Awards and nominations ==
Year	Award	Category	Nominee(s)	Result	Ref.
1995	Artios Awards	Best Casting for TV Movie of the Week	Valorie Massalas	Won	
1995	Peabody Awards		NBC, Barwood Films Ltd., Story Line Productions Inc., and Trillium Productions Inc., in association with TriStar Television	Won	
1995	Primetime Emmy Awards	Outstanding Made for Television Movie	Barbra Streisand, Glenn Close, Craig Zadan, Neil Meron, Cis Corman, and Richard Heus	Nominated	
1995	Primetime Emmy Awards	Outstanding Lead Actress in a Miniseries or a Special	Glenn Close	Won	
1995	Primetime Emmy Awards	Outstanding Supporting Actress in a Miniseries or a Special	Judy Davis	Won (Note: Tied with Shirley Knight for Indictment: The McMartin Trial.)	
1995	Primetime Emmy Awards	Outstanding Individual Achievement in Directing for a Miniseries or a Special	Jeff Bleckner	Nominated	
1995	Primetime Emmy Awards	Outstanding Writing for a Miniseries or a Special	Alison Cross	Won	
1995	Primetime Emmy Awards	Outstanding Individual Achievement in Editing for a Miniseries or a Special – Single Camera Production	Geoffrey Rowland	Nominated	
1996	GLAAD Media Awards	Outstanding Television Movie		Won	
1996	Golden Globe Awards	Best Miniseries or Motion Picture Made for Television		Nominated	
1996	Golden Globe Awards	Best Actress in a Miniseries or Motion Picture Made for Television	Glenn Close	Nominated	
1996	Golden Globe Awards	Best Supporting Actress in a Series, Miniseries or Motion Picture Made for Television	Judy Davis	Nominated	
1996	Screen Actors Guild Awards	Outstanding Performance by a Female Actor in a Miniseries or Television Movie	Glenn Close	Nominated	
1996	Writers Guild of America Awards	Original Long Form	Alison Cross	Nominated	
