= Margarethe Cammermeyer =

American LGBTQ rights activist and soldier

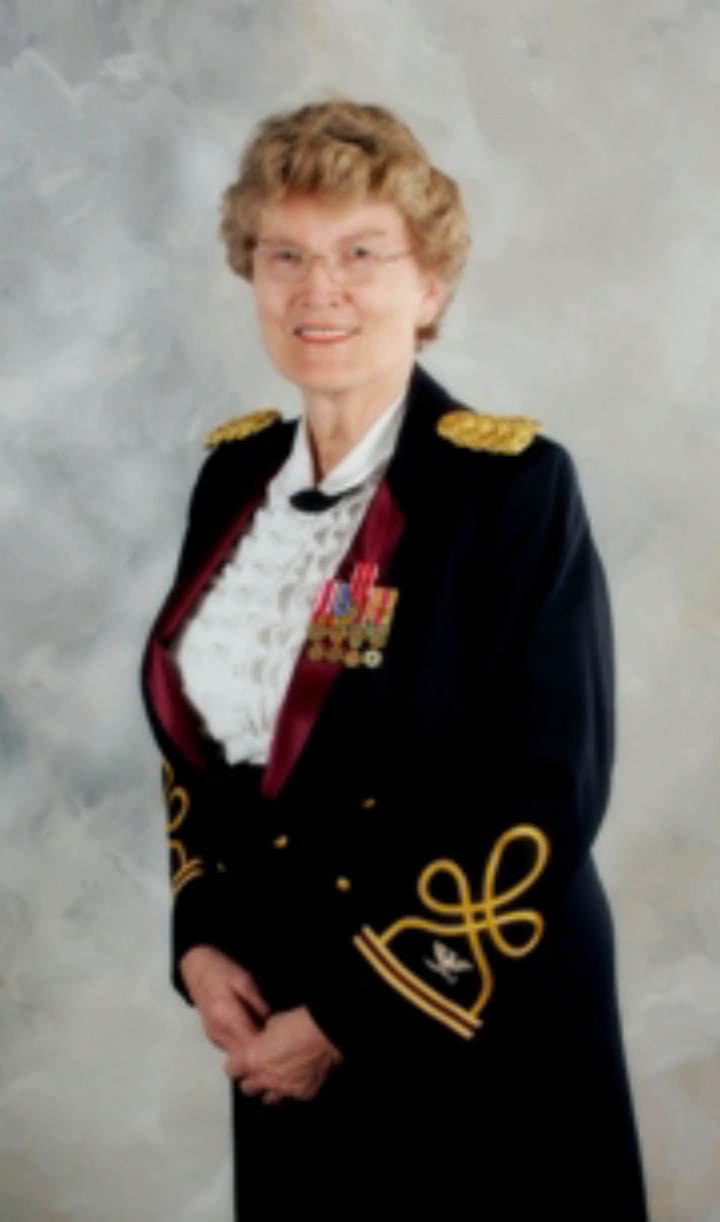
- Born: March 24, 1942 (age 84); Oslo, Norway
- Citizenship: Norway and U.S.
- Education: University of Maryland, Baltimore (BS); University of Washington (MS, PhD)
- Known for: LGBT rights activism

Margarethe "Grethe" Cammermeyer (born March 24, 1942) is a Norwegian-American former military officer. She served as a colonel in the Washington National Guard and became a gay rights activist.

== Early life and education ==
Born in Oslo, Norway, she became a United States citizen in 1960. In 1961 she joined the Army Nurse Corps as a student. She received a B.S. in nursing in 1963 from the University of Maryland. At the University of Washington School of Nursing, she earned a master's degree in 1976 and a Ph.D. in 1991.

== Career and activism ==
She had a 15-year marriage to Harvey Hawken and they had four sons. She divorced in 1980. In 1988, when she was 46, she met the woman who later became her wife, Diane Divelbess.

In 1989, responding to a question during a routine security clearance interview, she disclosed that she was a lesbian. The National Guard began military discharge proceedings against her. On June 11, 1992, she was honorably discharged. Cammermeyer filed a lawsuit against the decision in civil court. In June 1994, Judge Thomas Zilly of the United States District Court for the Western District of Washington ruled that her discharge and the ban on gays and lesbians serving in the military were unconstitutional. She returned to the National Guard and served as one of the few openly gay or lesbian people in the U.S. military while the "don't ask don't tell" policy was in effect, until her retirement in 1997.

A television movie about Cammermeyer's story, Serving in Silence, was made in 1995, with Glenn Close starring as Cammermeyer. Its content was largely taken from Cammermeyer's autobiography of the same name.

After retirement, Cammermeyer ran for the United States Congress in Washington's 2nd congressional district in 1998. She won the Democratic primary, but lost in the general election to Republican incumbent Jack Metcalf.

In June 2010, she was appointed to the Defense Advisory Committee on Women in the Services, a committee which is appointed by the United States Secretary of Defense and which reports to the United States Department of Defense.

The Point Foundation announced plans to honor Cammermeyer with its Point Legend Award in April 2011.

In 2012, after same-sex marriage was legalized in Washington state, Cammermeyer and her wife Diane Divelbess became the first same-sex couple to get a license in Island County.

== See also ==
- Sexual orientation and the United States military
