= List of awards and nominations received by Ted Danson =

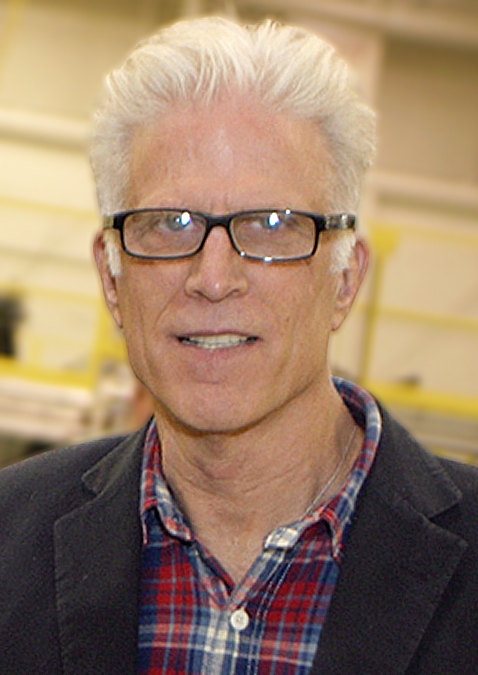
Danson in 2010

This article is a list of awards and nominations received by Ted Danson.

Ted Danson is an American actor known for his extensive roles in television. He started his career playing Sam Malone in the NBC sitcom Cheers (1982–1993) for which he received two Primetime Emmy Awards for Outstanding Lead Actor in a Comedy Series and two Golden Globe Awards for Best Actor – Television Series Musical or Comedy. He was also Emmy-nominated for playing an abusive father in the ABC television film Something About Amelia (1984), Arthur Frobisher in the FX legal thriller Damages (2007–2010), and Michael, a demon in the NBC sitcom The Good Place (2016–2020).

== Major associations ==
=== Emmy Awards ===
Primetime Emmy Awards
Year	Category	Nominated work	Result	Ref.
1983	Outstanding Lead Actor in a Comedy Series	Cheers (season one)	Nominated	
1984	Outstanding Lead Actor in a Comedy Series	Cheers (season two)	Nominated	
1984	Outstanding Lead Actor in a Miniseries or a Movie	Something About Amelia	Nominated	
1985	Outstanding Lead Actor in a Comedy Series	Cheers (season three)	Nominated	
1986	Outstanding Lead Actor in a Comedy Series	Cheers (season four)	Nominated	
1987	Outstanding Lead Actor in a Comedy Series	Cheers (episode: "Diamond Sam")	Nominated	
1988	Outstanding Lead Actor in a Comedy Series	Cheers (episode: "Home is the Sailor")	Nominated	
1989	Outstanding Lead Actor in a Comedy Series	Cheers (episode: "Swear to God")	Nominated	
1990	Outstanding Lead Actor in a Comedy Series	Cheers (episode: "Cry Harder, Part II")	Won	
1991	Outstanding Lead Actor in a Comedy Series	Cheers (episode: "Bad Neighbor Sam")	Nominated	
1992	Outstanding Lead Actor in a Comedy Series	Cheers (episode: "Go Make")	Nominated	
1993	Outstanding Lead Actor in a Comedy Series	Cheers (episode: "The Guy Can't Help It")	Won	
2008	Outstanding Supporting Actor in a Drama Series	Damages (episode: "Jesus, Mary and Joe C-cker")	Nominated	
2009	Outstanding Guest Actor in a Drama Series	Damages (episode: "They Had to Tweeze That Out of My Kidney")	Nominated	
2010	Outstanding Guest Actor in a Drama Series	Damages (episode: "The Next One's Gonna Go in Your Throat")	Nominated	
2018	Outstanding Lead Actor in a Comedy Series	The Good Place (episode: "Dance Dance Resolution")	Nominated	
2019	Outstanding Lead Actor in a Comedy Series	The Good Place (episode: "The Worst Possible Use of Free Will")	Nominated	
2020	Outstanding Lead Actor in a Comedy Series	The Good Place (episode: "Whenever You're Ready")	Nominated	
2025	Bob Hope Humanitarian Award		Honored	

=== Golden Globe Awards ===
Year	Category	Nominated work	Result	Ref.
1983	Best Actor – Television Series Musical or Comedy	Cheers	Nominated	
1984	Best Actor – Miniseries or Television Film	Something About Amelia	Won	
1985	Best Actor – Television Series Musical or Comedy	Cheers	Nominated	
1986	Best Actor – Television Series Musical or Comedy	Cheers	Nominated	
1988	Best Actor – Television Series Musical or Comedy	Cheers	Nominated	
1989	Best Actor – Television Series Musical or Comedy	Cheers	Won	
1990	Best Actor – Television Series Musical or Comedy	Cheers	Won	
1991	Best Actor – Television Series Musical or Comedy	Cheers	Nominated	
1992	Best Actor – Television Series Musical or Comedy	Cheers	Nominated	
2000	Best Actor – Television Series Musical or Comedy	Becker	Nominated	
2007	Best Supporting Actor – Television	Damages	Nominated	
2025	Best Actor – Television Series Musical or Comedy	A Man on the Inside	Nominated	
2025	Carol Burnett Award		Honored	

=== Actor Awards ===
Year	Category	Nominated work	Result	Ref.
2006	Outstanding Actor in a Miniseries or Television Movie	Knights of the South Bronx	Nominated	
2018	Outstanding Ensemble in a Comedy Series	Curb Your Enthusiasm	Nominated	
2025	Outstanding Actor in a Comedy Series	A Man on the Inside	Nominated	
2026	Outstanding Actor in a Comedy Series	A Man on the Inside	Nominated	

== Miscellaneous awards ==
=== American Comedy Awards ===
Year	Category	Nominated work	Result	Ref.
1989	Funniest Male Performer in a Television Series	Cheers	Nominated	
1990	Funniest Male Performer in a Television Series	Cheers	Nominated	
1990	Funniest Supporting Actor in a Motion Picture	Dad	Nominated	
1991	Funniest Male Performer in a Television Series	Cheers	Won	

=== Critics' Choice Awards ===
Year	Category	Nominated work	Result	Ref.
Critics' Choice Television Awards
2017	Best Actor in a Comedy Series	The Good Place	Won	
2018	Best Actor in a Comedy Series	The Good Place	Nominated	
2019	Best Actor in a Comedy Series	The Good Place	Nominated	
2026	Best Actor in a Comedy Series	A Man on the Inside	Nominated	

=== People's Choice Awards ===
Year	Category	Nominated work	Result	Ref.
1985	Favorite Male TV Performer	Cheers	Nominated	
1988	Favorite Male TV Performer	Cheers	Nominated	
1989	Favorite Male TV Performer	Cheers	Nominated	
1990	Favorite Male TV Performer	Cheers	Nominated	
1991	Favorite Male TV Performer	Cheers	Nominated	
1992	Favorite Male TV Performer	Cheers	Nominated	
1993	Favorite Male TV Performer	Cheers	Nominated	

=== Satellite Awards ===
Year	Category	Nominated work	Result	Ref.
1997	Best Actor – Miniseries or Television Film	Gulliver's Travels	Nominated	
2000	Best Actor – Television Series Musical or Comedy	Becker	Nominated	
2003	Best Actor – Miniseries or Television Film	Living with the Dead	Nominated	
2005	Best Actor – Miniseries or Television Film	Our Fathers	Nominated	
2006	Best Actor – Television Series Musical or Comedy	Help Me Help You	Nominated	

=== TCA Awards ===
Year	Category	Nominated work	Result	Ref.
2018	Individual Achievement in Comedy	The Good Place	Nominated	
2022	Career Achievement Award		Honored	

=== Viewers for Quality Television ===
Year	Category	Nominated work	Result	Ref.
1990	Best Actor in a Quality Comedy Series	Cheers	Nominated	
1991	Best Actor in a Quality Comedy Series	Cheers	Nominated	

== Honorary degrees ==
Year	University	Degree	Result	Ref.
2018	Carnegie Mellon University	Honorary Doctorate Degree	Honored	
