= Damages season 1 =

Damages
- Season 1
- Region 1 DVD artwork
- No. of episodes: 13

Release
- Original network: FX
- Original release: July 24 – October 23, 2007

Season chronology
- Next → Season 2

The first season of the FX legal drama series Damages premiered on July 24, 2007, and concluded on October 23, 2007. It consisted of thirteen episodes. Damages was created by brothers Todd and Glenn Kessler along with Daniel Zelman, each of whom served as executive producers and contributed seven scripts for the season, including the premiere and the finale.

Most of the season follows two different timelines. The primary timeline begins with Ellen Parsons' (Rose Byrne) recruitment by Patty Hewes (Glenn Close) to "Hewes & Associates" and follows proceedings of a class action lawsuit against Arthur Frobisher (Ted Danson) by his former employees, whom Patty represents. The initial episodes follow Patty's attempts to capture potential witness Gregory Malina (Peter Facinelli) through Katie Connor (Anastasia Griffith). The arc further details Malina's involvement with Frobisher's lawyer Ray Fiske (Željko Ivanek) and the pressure Patty brings to bear on Fiske on Malina's subsequent death.

The narrative includes multiple flashforwards of the other timeline, set approximately six months after Ellen's appointment, until both timelines converge in the penultimate episode of the season. The alternative timeline details the attack on Ellen, her arrest for the murder of her fiancé David Connor (Noah Bean), and the subsequent murder investigation.

== Cast and characters ==
=== Main cast ===
- Glenn Close as Patty Hewes
- Rose Byrne as Ellen Parsons
- Željko Ivanek as Ray Fiske
- Noah Bean as David Connor
- Tate Donovan as Thomas Shayes
- Ted Danson as Arthur Frobisher

=== Recurring cast ===
- Philip Bosco as Hollis Nye
- Anastasia Griffith as Katie Connor
- Peter Riegert as George Moore
- Marlyne Barrett as Felicia Marquand
- Maya Days as Detective Rosario Ortiz
- Peter Facinelli as Gregory Malina
- Donnie Keshawarz as Andrew Vida
- Michael Nouri as Phil Grey
- Casey Siemaszko as Detective Dan Williams
- Zachary Booth as Michael Hewes
- David Costabile as Bearded Man/Detective Rick Messer
- Carmen Goodine as Lila DiMeo
- Tom Aldredge as Uncle Pete
- Victor Arnold as Larry Popler
- Todd A. Kessler as Perry the Doorman
- Elliot Korte as Owen Frobisher
- Garret Dillahunt as Marshall Phillips
- Robin Thomas as Martin Cutler
- Glenn Kessler as Agent L.J. Werner
- Debra Monk as Denise Parsons
- Jennifer Roszell as Deb Shayes
- Francie Swift as Holly Frobisher
- Mario Van Peebles as Agent Randall Harrison

== Episodes ==
No. overall	No. in season	Title	Directed by	Written by	Original release date	US viewers (millions)
1	1	"Get Me a Lawyer"	Allen Coulter	Todd A. Kessler & Glenn Kessler & Daniel Zelman	July 24, 2007	3.66
Patty hires Ellen despite Ellen's having missed the interview. Ellen is assigned to the Arthur Frobisher case. Frobisher offers a settlement of $100 million with the help of one of the foremen of the employees, Larry Popler (Victor Arnold). When the employees reveal that they had earlier decided to accept such an offer, Patty pretends to fire her second-in-command, Tom Shayes (Tate Donovan), for not having known about it. David proposes to Ellen. David's sister, Katie, reveals to Ellen that her upcoming restaurant is being financed by Frobisher. Ellen wonders if Patty hired her simply because of her relationship with Katie. Patty intimidates Katie, making her believe Frobisher is after her. In the future timeline, Ellen is found covered in blood. On inspecting her apartment, the police find the dead body of David Connor.
2	2	"Jesus, Mary and Joe Cocker"	Greg Yaitanes	Todd A. Kessler & Glenn Kessler & Daniel Zelman	July 31, 2007	2.93
At Ellen's birthday party, Katie gifts her a pair of Statue of Liberty bookends. In the light of Katie's appearance as a potential witness, Patty asks her clients to reject the settlement for the moment. Patty asks Katie to give her a complete and accurate account of her time in Florida. Still intimidated by Frobisher's people, and upon Patty's advice, Katie signs a confidentiality agreement with Frobisher. Katie finally admits to Patty that she lied earlier, and confides she had one night stand with Gregory Malina while in Florida. Patty offers Ellen a new apartment. In the future timeline, the police collect one of the bookends as the murder weapon, and Ellen is shown handling it.
3	3	"And My Paralyzing Fear of Death"	John David Coles	Todd A. Kessler & Glenn Kessler & Daniel Zelman	August 7, 2007	2.06
When Patty and Ray Fiske are called by the judge about the Frobisher case, Patty is tasked to provide, by Friday, a brief documenting a substantial reason to continue with the litigation. Patty receives a hand grenade mailed to her office. Seeing this as possible death threat, Patty takes 24-hour protection. Patty has Tom investigate Gregory Malina. Patty's husband Phil (Michael Nouri) has an accident when he finds another hand grenade in his car. Ellen has to skip her engagement party when she is stuck delivering the brief to the judge. Patty's son Michael (Zachary Booth) tells his school counselor about Patty's dream (in which she is assassinated) as if it were his. Patty has him transferred to a reform academy when she discovers he planted the grenades. In the future timeline, Ellen says that she didn't kill David and that someone tried to kill her.
4	4	"Tastes Like a Ho-Ho"	Larry Trilling	Mark Fish	August 14, 2007	2.12
Katie perjures herself during deposition after Gregory intentionally provides her with incorrect information. Patty, knowing all along that Katie was never a viable witness, lets this happen so that Frobisher will withdraw his settlement offer. Patty also discovers that Gregory owned shares of Frobisher's company in 2002, and sold them on the same day Frobisher sold his. David tries to fend off advances from Lila (Carmen Goodine), his patient's granddaughter. Tom explores alternative job opportunities. In the future timeline, Katie is shown David's body, sees Ellen through the interrogation window, and is told her brother and Ellen had broken their engagement weeks before.
5	5	"A Regular Earl Anthony"	Jean DeSegonzac	Todd A. Kessler & Glenn Kessler & Daniel Zelman & Mark Fish	August 21, 2007	2.15
Patty's clients, disappointed by Frobisher's withdrawal of his settlement and the discrediting of Katie as a witness, decide to fire Patty and hire Tom as their attorney. Using the clients as leverage, Tom finally succeeds in negotiating a partnership with Patty. Katie reveals that she has been in contact with Gregory Malina after their first encounter in Florida. In the future timeline, Ellen claims that someone tried to kill her in Patty's apartment.
6	6	"She Spat at Me"	Mario Van Peebles	Mark Fish	September 4, 2007	3.55
Ellen contacts Gregory and tries to make him cooperate with the Frobisher case. Gregory tells Ellen that Frobisher's Florida meeting was not with his broker. Frobisher plans to have his biography written in order to clean up his image, but ends up getting drunk and physically assaulting the writer. Lila asks for David's help at her home and steals his keys. In the future timeline, the police cannot verify Ellen's claims about the attack on her. Lila tells the police about her relationship with David, which she proves through the stolen keys, and plays them a recording of Ellen's threat to harm her.
7	7	"We Are Not Animals"	Dan Attias	Aaron Zelman	September 11, 2007	N/A
Patty's firm subpoena's Gregory Malina in the Frobisher case. Fiske's failed attempt to cancel the subpoena causes him to advise Gregory to leave the city, and Gregory flees, despite Patty's attempt to convince him to appear at the deposition. Tom and Ellen think Patty suspects that Tom tried to hire Ellen while he was planning to start his own law firm. Patty offers her son Michael emancipation papers when he refuses to come home from reform academy. In the future timeline, Tom meets Ellen in the police holding cell. Ellen asks Hollis Nye (Philip Bosco) to follow Tom, who will lead them to Patty.
8	8	"Blame the Victim"	Guy Ferland	Willie Reale and Davey Holmes	September 18, 2007	1.70
Patty confronts Larry Popler, one of the client representatives, after she discovers he is leaking information to Frobisher. Larry agrees to help Patty from thereon. Frobisher confirms to Larry that Gregory Malina is still alive. Tom and Ellen meet George Moore (Peter Riegert), an SEC official involved in Frobisher's investigation. Ellen tries to help her father with an accident case he was involved in. In the future timeline, Ellen faces a preliminary hearing for a murder charge and has the bail set for $1.5 million.
9	9	"Do You Regret What We Did?"	Thomas Carter	Todd A. Kessler & Glenn Kessler & Daniel Zelman	September 25, 2007	1.17
George Moore provides Ellen with information about Frobisher's past criminal case in order to force Frobisher to settle the class action suit. Gregory visits Katie and explains why he provided her false information; he also makes a videotape confessing his relationship with Ray Fiske and Moore's involvement in Frobisher scandal. He is hit and killed by a car outside Katie's house, on Moore's instructions. Lila DiMeo harasses both David and Ellen. In the future timeline, Ellen, still in jail, urges Tom to locate Patty. Patty has a breakdown at her beach house and is shown driving away from New York State.
10	10	"Sort of Like a Family"	Timothy Busfield	Mark Fish & Jeremy Doner	October 2, 2007	N/A
After Frobisher quashes Patty's only lead against him ahead of the deposition, Ellen proposes to contact Moore again for further information, but Patty forbids her to do that. Ellen pursues Moore anyway and discovers that he hindered the SEC investigation. Patty fires Ellen for insubordination. Frobisher's wife files for divorce, and Patty uses this against him in the deposition. In the future timeline, Tom discovers evidence of a possible cover-up at Patty's apartment. Ellen tells Tom that Patty tried to have her killed.
11	11	"I Hate These People"	Ed Bianchi	Adam Stein	October 9, 2007	N/A
Patty offers Ellen her job back. Ellen declines but volunteers to keep helping Patty with the Frobisher case. Lila is back and bringing more havoc into David and Ellen's lives. Patty uses the newly acquired evidence to blackmail Ray Fiske but offers him an ultimatum.
12	12	"There's No 'We' Anymore"	Mario Van Peebles	Todd A. Kessler & Glenn Kessler & Daniel Zelman	October 16, 2007	1.38
Patty finally posts bail for Ellen as Frobisher learns about a tape made by Gregory Malina that could ruin him.
13	13	"Because I Know Patty"	Todd A. Kessler	Todd A. Kessler & Glenn Kessler & Daniel Zelman	October 23, 2007	1.69
As the first season ends, Ellen is cleared of murder charges; Frobisher agrees to settle with his former employees; a surprising flashback reveals why Patty went to the cemetery; at David's burial Ellen and Katie talk; and Hollis Nye plays a role in Ellen's returning to work for Patty.

== Reception ==
=== Awards and nominations ===
For its first season, Damages was nominated for Outstanding Drama Series at the 2008 Primetime Emmy Awards, along with six other nominations. Co-creators Todd A. Kessler, Glenn Kessler, and Daniel Zelman were nominated for writing and Allen Coulter for directing the pilot episode ("Get Me a Lawyer"). Glenn Close received a nomination for Outstanding Lead Actress in a Drama Series, with co-stars Ted Danson and Željko Ivanek nominated for Outstanding Supporting Actor in a Drama Series. Close and Ivanek won in their respective categories, with the series also receiving a Creative Arts Emmy for Outstanding Casting for a Drama Series. The series earned four nominations at the 65th Golden Globe Awards, including Best Television Series – Drama, Close for Best Actress, and Rose Byrne and Ted Danson for their supporting roles. Close won the award in her category.

=== Critical reviews ===
The first season of Damages was met with mostly high praise, and it earned 75 out of 100 based on 27 reviews on the aggregate review website Metacritic. This qualifies as "generally favorable" reviews. On Rotten Tomatoes, the season has an approval rating of 83% with an average score of 8 out of 10 based on 24 reviews. The website's critical consensus reads, "Damages injects a high dosage of quality storytelling into a familiar genre with terrific performances and some amusing psychological unrest."

=== Ratings ===
The series premiere on July 24, 2007 drew 3.7 million viewers, with total of 5.1 million viewers including re-airing on the same night, becoming the most watched cable television program for the night. However, the viewership declined over the first season, partially due to the story's serialized approach, with the season finale drawing 1.4 million viewers.
