= The Shepherd (Once Upon a Time) =

- Once Upon a Time episode
- King George (Dale) speaks with Prince Charming (Dallas)
- Episode no.: Season 1 Episode 6
- Directed by: Victor Nelli
- Written by: Ian B. Goldberg; Andrew Chambliss
- Original air date: December 4, 2011

Guest appearances
- David Anders as Dr. Whale; Alan Dale as King George; Anastasia Griffith as Abigail/Kathryn Nolan; Josh Dallas as Prince James (guest appearance); Gabrielle Rose as Ruth; Alex Zahara as King Midas

Episode chronology
← Previous "That Still Small Voice"	Next → "The Heart Is a Lonely Hunter"
- Once Upon a Time season 1

"The Shepherd" is the sixth episode of the American Fairy Tale/Drama television series Once Upon a Time. The series takes place in the fictional seaside town of Storybrooke, Maine, in which the residents are actually characters from various fairy tales that were transported to the "real world" town by a powerful curse. This episode revolves around David's (Josh Dallas) increasing attraction to Mary Margaret (Ginnifer Goodwin), the back story behind Prince Charming's (Dallas) past, and Sheriff Graham (Jamie Dornan) getting caught lying.

It was co-written by Ian B. Goldberg and Andrew Chambliss, while being directed by Victor Nelli. The episode first aired in the United States on ABC on December 4, 2011.

== Title card ==
A flaming dragon is in the forest.

== Plot ==
=== In Storybrooke ===
In Storybrooke, Kathryn (Anastasia Griffith) brings David (Josh Dallas) home for a party in an attempt to bring back his memory. Henry (Jared S. Gilmore) tells Emma Swan (Jennifer Morrison) that his amnesia is keeping the curse out, which is why the fake memories have not set in. Later that evening, David tells Mary Margaret (Ginnifer Goodwin) he did not choose Kathryn, and tells Mary Margaret that he loves her instead. That night, Emma tells Mary to do what she feels is right and let David "figure out his life."

Later at the café, Regina (Lana Parrilla) tells Mary Margaret to stay away from David, who has left Kathryn. Hours later at the school, David shows up to see Mary Margaret, but before she can tell him to leave, David tells her that he has made up his mind and to meet him at the toll bridge where she found him the night he awoke. While en route later that evening, David becomes lost and is given false directions from Regina, leading him to Mr. Gold's (Robert Carlyle) Pawn Shop. David becomes fixated on a small windmill that he claims once belonged to him and regains his memories. Moments later at the toll bridge, David tells Mary Margaret that he remembers his life with Kathryn and wants to try again with his wife. A heartbroken Mary Margaret leaves and takes solace at the café, where Dr. Whale (David Anders) joins her and offers a drink. David, on the other hand, returns home to work things out with Kathryn.

Between these events, Emma agrees to cover the night shift at the Sheriff's department so Sheriff Graham can volunteer at the animal shelter. While on patrol, Emma sees a person climbing out of the Mayor's home. As she stops to capture the individual, she is shocked to see that it is none other than Sheriff Graham himself and realizes he is having an affair with Regina. Disgusted, Emma storms off and tells the Sheriff he can finish her shift.

=== In the characters' past ===
Meanwhile, in the Enchanted Forest, Prince James (Dallas) competes in a battle against a challenger, preparing for his acceptance from King Midas (Alex Zahara) to slay a dragon as part of a deal between him and James' father, King George (Alan Dale). However, after celebrating the deal, James is stabbed to death by the nearly dead challenger. This makes King George worried about his future and his kingdom, until Rumpelstiltskin (Carlyle) shows up to pay him a visit. Rumpelstiltskin tells him that James has a twin brother, as it appears that the king adopted James through Rumpelstiltskin in order to save the kingdom. He then tells the King that he can bring the twin to the castle to have him pose as James.

At a nearby valley, a young goat herder (despite the episode's title), James' twin brother, is tending his flock. As his mother (Gabrielle Rose) arrives home from the market, she mentions the prospect of an arranged marriage, but the shepherd is not prepared to marry for the sake of a dowry, even though the farm is in trouble. Rumpelstiltskin appears and tells the shepherd the truth about his twin brother being traded to save the farm, and George's offer. The shepherd reluctantly accepts, even as he forgives his mother.

While on their mission, the dragon kills the leading guards, prompting the shepherd to jump into action and trap and kill the dragon with the use of the wit he gained by tending the goats. After returning the dragon's head to King Midas, King George and the shepherd, who now takes his late brother James' name, receive a more surprising offer that will unite the two kingdoms: the hand of Midas's daughter Abigail (Griffith) in marriage. But just as the shepherd is about to turn down the offer, King George pulls him aside and whispers in his ear that he is to accept the deal or he will kill him and his mother and take away their land. The shepherd has no choice but to go along with the deal.

As the shepherd returns to his home, he tells his mother that he will not be staying and he can never see her again, in order to maintain his cover as James. However, she gives him a ring that she hopes will be worn by the one that he'll fall in love with. The shepherd returns to the kingdom to thank King George and King Midas, then takes his new bride-to-be Abigail to their destined location, where along the way they're about to encounter a road block that was put in place by a hooded vagabond named Snow White (Goodwin) (This alludes to the fact that King George just said "You are on your way to true love").

== Production ==
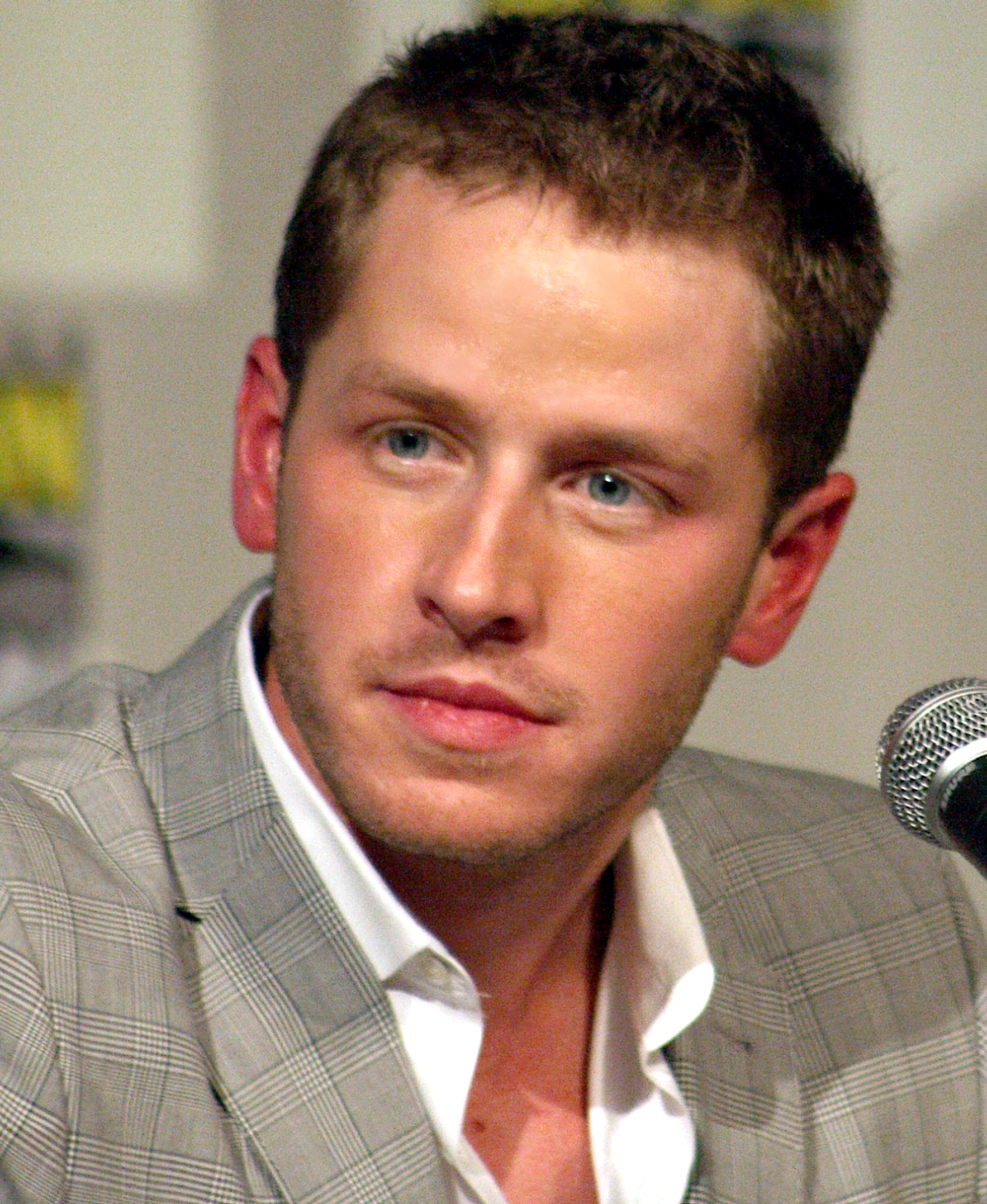
Prince Charming (Josh Dallas, pictured) was the focus of this episode.

The episode was co-written by co-producers Andrew Chambliss and Ian B. Goldberg, while being directed by Ugly Betty veteran Victor Nelli. Co-creators Edward Kitsis and Adam Horowitz wanted to make the series' version of Prince Charming different from traditional interpretations, and decided to mirror the story of The Prince and the Pauper. "What if he was a regular person like us?," Kitsis recalled. As a result, Joshua Dallas tried to bring a "rural" feel to the character and make him accessible to viewers.

In August 2011, TVLine reported that Lost actor Alan Dale would be playing the father of Prince Charming for one episode, with the potential for him to return for more. Series co-creator Adam Horowitz called it "a really pivotal role, and a pivotal part of the Snow White (Ginnifer Goodwin) and Prince Charming story that we don’t think has been told yet." In addition to Dale, the episode featured guest actors David Anders as Dr. Whale, Anastasia Griffith as Abigail/Kathryn Nolan, Gabrielle Rose as Ruth, and Alex Zahara as King Midas.

"The Shepherd" was included in Reawakened: A Once Upon a Time Tale – a novelization of the first season – which was published by Hyperion Books in 2013.

== Cultural references ==
In addition to being inspired by The Prince and the Pauper, another series of allusions were referenced in this episode. Both the clock moving from 8:23 to 8:42 and a bottle of McCutcheon Scotch are references to the television series Lost. Oliver Sava of The A.V. Club and Cindy McLennan of Television Without Pity also observed two other similarities: that Dale was playing an evil father, and the repeated use of the word "shepherd".

== Reception ==
=== Ratings ===
"The Shepherd" first aired on December 4, 2011, when it was watched by an estimated 9.66 million viewers and earned a 5.6/8 ratings share for overall viewers. Among adults aged 18 to 49, the episode had a ratings share of 3.2/7, a decrease of 9 percent from the previous episode. It ranked third in its timeslot, being beaten by Football Night In America on NBC and The Amazing Race on CBS but ahead of The Simpsons on the Fox network. In Canada, the episode finished in fifteenth place for the week, garnering an estimated 1.55 million viewers, an increase from the 1.43 million viewers of the previous episode.

=== Reviews ===
The episode was met with positive reviews.

IGN writer Eric Goldman gave it a rating of 7.5 out of 10, an indication of a "good" episode. He thought Charming's fight with the dragon was a "well done sequence" and praised Goodwin and Carlyle's performances, though at times he felt the latter actor delved into campiness. In an article from Zap2It, reviewer Andrea Reiher noted that the episode made "us love Josh Dallas and Ginnifer Goodwin even more, which we didn't think was possible," and also praised the characterization of its female friendships. Oliver Sava of The A.V. Club found similarities between the forward momentum of "The Shepherd" and the television series The Vampire Diaries, attributing this to Chambliss and his other job working as that series' story editor. Sava felt that the episode's "saving grace" was Dallas, lauding his performance and chemistry with Goodwin. However, Sava criticized the episode's special effects, especially the emphasis on green screen.

Laura Prudom, writing for AOLTV, was pleased to see more of Snow and Charming's story from the episode "Snow Falls", writing that Goodwin and Dallas do "an outstanding job portraying the starcrossed lovers, and their longing [is] palpable." Consequently, Prudom found it "heartbreaking to see Mary Margaret wrestling with the morality of stealing a married man from his wife," especially when he gains back his memories as David. Teresa Jusino of Tor.com found Charming's backstory fascinating, writing that he "is a wonderful character not just because of the way he’s written, but because of Dallas’ grounded performance... his best work so far." Jusino also praised the writing of the female characters, opining that "Mary Margaret, Emma, and Regina offer very different versions of what a woman can be, and while we might individually prefer one or the other, they are all complex and realistic."

== Cast ==
=== Starring ===
- Ginnifer Goodwin as Snow White/Mary Margaret Blanchard
- Jennifer Morrison as Emma Swan
- Lana Parrilla as Regina Mills
- Josh Dallas as "Prince" Charming
- Jared S. Gilmore as Henry Mills
- Raphael Sbarge (credit only)
- Jamie Dornan as Sheriff Graham
- Robert Carlyle as Rumplestiltskin/Mr. Gold

=== Guest Starring ===
- David Anders as Dr. Whale
- Alan Dale as King George
- Anastasia Griffith as Abigail/Kathryn Nolan
- Gabrielle Rose as Ruth
- Alex Zahara as King Midas

=== Co-Starring ===
- Ian Butcher as Burly Knight
- Demord Dann as Aide
- Matthew MacCaull as Knight #1
- Robert Maillet as Behemoth

=== Uncredited ===
- Josh Dallas as Prince James
- Unknown as Ellen
- Unknown as Gene
- Lucas Wolf as Armed Escort (archive footage)
- Unknown as Floyd
