= Damages season 2 =

Damages
- Season 2
- Region 1 DVD artwork
- No. of episodes: 13

Release
- Original network: FX
- Original release: January 7 – April 1, 2009

Season chronology
- ← Previous; Season 1 Next → Season 3

The second season of the FX legal drama series Damages premiered on January 7, 2009, and concluded on April 1, 2009. It consisted of thirteen episodes, bringing the series total to 26. Damages was created by brothers Todd and Glenn Kessler along with Daniel Zelman, each of whom served as executive producers and contributed seven scripts for the season, including the premiere and the finale.

The second season, like the first, follows two different timelines. The primary timeline follows Patty, Ellen, and Tom as the firm goes up against an energy company who have engaged in unethical practices. A former lover of Patty's, Daniel Purcell (William Hurt), brings the matter to her attention, but then inexplicably backs out, leaving Patty up against UNR CEO Walter Kendrick (John Doman) and his fierce lawyer Claire Maddox (Marcia Gay Harden). Meanwhile, Ellen works with the FBI to bring down Patty, while also seeking revenge on Arthur Frobisher for his presumed role in her fiance's death. Ellen is unaware that Patty is suspicious of her, and that Frobisher's criminal connections appear to extend to her new friend Wes (Timothy Olyphant).

A second timeline takes place six months later, when Ellen meets with an unknown person in a hotel room, and subsequently appears to shoot the person.

== Cast and characters ==
=== Main cast ===
- Glenn Close as Patty Hewes
- Rose Byrne as Ellen Parsons
- Tate Donovan as Thomas Shayes
- Anastasia Griffith as Katie Connor
- Marcia Gay Harden as Claire Maddox
- Timothy Olyphant as Wes Krulik
- Ted Danson as Arthur Frobisher
- William Hurt as Daniel Purcell

=== Recurring cast ===
- Glenn Kessler as Agent L.J. Werner
- Zachary Booth as Michael Hewes
- John Doman as Walter Kendrick
- David Costabile as Bearded Man/Detective Rick Messer
- Michael Nouri as Phil Grey
- Mario Van Peebles as Agent Randall Harrison
- Clarke Peters as Dave Pell
- Darrell Hammond as The Deacon
- Tom Aldredge as Uncle Pete
- Brett Cullen as Wayne Sutry
- Paige Turco as Christine Purcell
- Kevin Corrigan as Finn Garrity
- Michael Pemberton as Malcolm
- Lynn Cohen as Stefania McKee
- Wendy Moniz as Jill Burnham
- Tom Noonan as Detective Victor Huntley
- Željko Ivanek as Ray Fiske
- Matthew Davis as Josh Reston
- Noah Bean as David Connor
- Philip Bosco as Hollis Nye
- Michael Gaston as Roger Kastle
- Todd A. Kessler as Perry the Doorman
- Debra Monk as Denise Parsons
- Jennifer Roszell as Deb Shayes

== Episodes ==
No. overall	No. in season	Title	Directed by	Written by	Original release date	US viewers (millions)
14	1	"I Lied, Too"	Todd A. Kessler	Todd A. Kessler & Glenn Kessler & Daniel Zelman	January 7, 2009	1.72
Patty is putting efforts into her new charitable foundation when she is approached by Daniel Purcell, a man from her past, who requests her to represent him. Working for two FBI agents (Mario Van Peebles and Glenn Kessler) now, Ellen encounters Wes Krulik at a group therapy meeting. She also visits Frobisher, who survived the attack on his life and is recovering under strong security. Patty tells Ellen about her still-born daughter Julia. Patty is called to Purcell's home when his wife (Paige Turco) is found dead. In the future timeline, Ellen is shown shooting at an unknown character.
15	2	"Burn It, Shred It, I Don't Care"	Jean de Segonzac	Todd A. Kessler & Glenn Kessler & Daniel Zelman	January 14, 2009	1.14
Patty takes Purcell's case. He tells her about a toxicity study of a chemical compound he conducted which yielded very negative results, which were suppressed by his firm. Patty initially transfers the infant-mortality case to Tom but then asks him to reject the case to help her in the Purcell case. Ellen tells Wes about her visit to Frobisher, upon which he advises her to stay clear of Frobisher. Wes is revealed to be following the Frobisher case very closely, including David's murder. Patty deliberately leaks information from her office to find out that Ultima National Resources is behind creation of toxic compound. In the future timeline, Ellen has a liaison with Wes Krulick, following which she meets Tom who gives her a handgun.
16	3	"I Knew Your Pig"	Constantine Makris	Todd A. Kessler & Glenn Kessler & Daniel Zelman	January 21, 2009	0.76
FBI detectives ask Ellen to back off her investigation but she nonetheless decides to find how Purcell and Patty are related in the past. She uncovers that Purcell served as expert witness in two past trials of Patty, the first one seventeen years ago. Patty tells Ellen she had a liaison with Purcell on their first meeting. Ellen correctly deduces that Purcell is father of Patty's son Michael. Patty asks Purcell to undergo a polygraph test after his wife's murder investigation reveals a case of domestic violence. She has Purcell arrested in order to force him to retain her as his lawyer. Ellen gets a call from Katie who would like to meet her and her new boyfriend. In the meantime, two men working for Kendrick raid a reporter in West Virginia (Matthew Davis) who is investigating water toxicity for Purcell and take away his camera and cell phone. A man is shown pawning the ruby ring that belonged to Purcell's wife.
17	4	"Hey! Mr. Pibb!"	Mario Van Peebles	Aaron Zelman	January 28, 2009	1.03
While Patty works to clear Daniel Purcell of his wife's murder, Ellen and Tom head to West Virginia to gather information in the case against Ultima National Resources. Ellen and Tom locate a reporter that Daniel Purcell was in contact with, and the reporter gives them a sample of the water taken from Ultima's plant. Patty gives the sample to Daniel, who promises to test it and also testify against UNR. At a preliminary hearing, Daniel surprisingly changes his testimony when Patty puts him on the witness stand. Daniel is later revealed to have poured the sample water into the lake after accepting a bribe from Ultima.
18	5	"I Agree, It Wasn't Funny"	Tate Donovan	Mark Fish	February 4, 2009	0.85
Ellen returns to Patty's apartment for a party to celebrate Tom's tenth anniversary at the firm. Patty and her son Michael argue over the fact that Michael writes about his father, Daniel Purcell, in his college application essay. Ultima announces a proposed merger—Patty tries to get an environmental officer to delay the merger (by showing him Daniel Purcell's original report). Patty's husband Phil is revealed to be having an affair. Phil assists Patty by looking through Ultima's proposed merger and realizes that Ultima is actually over-paying for this acquisition, thus leading Patty to suspect that Ultima is after something else. The FBI and Ellen hatch a plan to make Patty trust Ellen even more. In the future timeline, Ellen is shown meeting with Wes, who before ordered someone to follow Ellen and having connections with Ellen's late fiancé's killer.
19	6	"A Pretty Girl in a Leotard"	Greg Yaitanes	Adam Stein	February 11, 2009	0.94
Patty wages a media war against Walter Kendrick, whom she believes to be responsible for Christine Purcell's murder. Kendrick wages war with his lawyer, Claire Maddox, and his sternest advisor Dave (Clarke Peters). Meanwhile, Ellen gets a step closer to tying Frobisher to David's murder.
20	7	"New York Sucks"	Matthew Penn	Jeremy Doner	February 18, 2009	0.86
Furious at Patty for the new alliance with Arthur Frobisher, Ellen gives the FBI a new lead that could bring Patty down. In the process, however, loyal Uncle Pete (Tom Aldredge) ends up taking the fall.
21	8	"They Had to Tweeze That Out of My Kidney"	Michael Pressman	Aaron Zelman	February 25, 2009	0.89
As she copes with Uncle Pete's overdose, Patty begins to unravel Walter Kendrick's energy scheme. Ellen finally deals with her grief over David. And Arthur Frobisher's past comes back to haunt him.
22	9	"You Got Your Prom Date Pregnant"	Ed Bianchi	Mark Fish	March 4, 2009	0.97
Patty goes on the offensive against the FBI, while Ellen receives troubling news about the investigation. Meanwhile, Patty's husband gets an intriguing offer.
23	10	"Uh Oh, Out Come the Skeletons"	Tate Donovan	Todd A. Kessler & Glenn Kessler & Daniel Zelman	March 11, 2009	0.70
As Patty ramps up the pressure on UNR, her foes start to crack. Meanwhile, Wes and Ellen's relationship takes a new turn, and the FBI investigation of Patty takes a shocking twist.
24	11	"London. Of Course"	Andy Wolk	Todd A. Kessler & Daniel Zelman	March 18, 2009	0.63
While Claire Maddox risks everything to oust Kendrick, Ellen discovers a dark secret about Patty's personal life.
25	12	"Look What He Dug Up This Time"	Matthew Penn	Daniel Zelman & Glenn Kessler	March 25, 2009	0.89
Ellen convinces the FBI to radically change their approach in the investigation. Meanwhile, Daniel Purcell reenters Patty's life and becomes critical to her case against UNR.
26	13	"Trust Me"	Todd A. Kessler	Glenn Kessler & Todd A. Kessler	April 1, 2009	1.05
Patty goes to extremes to win her case against UNR, as Ellen's season long quest for revenge builds to an explosive conclusion. Patty discovers that Ellen has been working with the FBI to build a case against her—and she decides to frame Ellen for bribing a judge. The recurring images of Ellen shooting Patty are finally clarified.

== Production ==
FX renewed the series for a second season that began airing in January 2009. It was originally scheduled to begin airing during summer 2008, but due to the Writer's Guild Strike, it was pushed back, resulting with the production for season 2 starting exactly 11 months after the series premiered on FX.

== Reception ==
=== Awards and nominations ===
For its second season, Damages was nominated for seven Primetime Emmy nominations at the 2009 Primetime Emmy Awards, with Glenn Close receiving her second Emmy nomination for Outstanding Lead Actress in a Drama Series. Ted Danson also received another nomination, for Outstanding Guest Actor in a Drama Series. Rose Byrne earned her first Emmy nomination for Outstanding Supporting Actress in a Drama Series and William Hurt was nominated for Outstanding Supporting Actor in a Drama Series. The series again was nominated for direction and the show itself was nominated again for Outstanding Drama Series. On September 20, 2009, the show won its fourth Emmy Award when Glenn Close won the Emmy for Outstanding Lead Actress in a Drama Series.

The series earned three nominations at the 67th Golden Globe Awards, including Close for Best Actress, and Byrne and Hurt for their supporting roles.

=== Critical reviews ===
The second season of Damages was met with mostly high praise, and it earned 81 out of 100 based on 18 reviews on the aggregate review website Metacritic, which qualifies as "universal acclaim". On Rotten Tomatoes, the season has an approval rating of 90% with an average score of 8.7 out of 10 based on 21 reviews. The website's critical consensus reads, "Thrilling and captivating, Damages is the epitome of a well-made melodramatic crime thriller, with addictive storylines and an enthralling performance by Glenn Close."
