= Chris Terrio =

American film director and screenwriter

- Born: December 31, 1976 (age 49); New York City, New York, U.S.
- Education: Harvard University; University of Cambridge; USC School of Cinematic Arts
- Occupations: Screenwriter; film director
- Years active: 2000–present

Chris Terrio (born December 31, 1976) is an American screenwriter and film director. He is best known for writing the screenplay for the 2012 film Argo, for which he won the Academy Award for Best Adapted Screenplay. Terrio also won the Writers Guild Award for Best Adapted Screenplay of 2012 and was nominated for Golden Globe Award for Best Screenplay, a BAFTA, and the 2013 Los Angeles Film Critics Award for Best Adapted Screenplay for this work.

Terrio wrote the screenplay for Batman v Superman: Dawn of Justice, the follow-up to Zack Snyder's Man of Steel, based on an earlier draft by David S. Goyer, and is credited as co-writer for the 2017 film Justice League, alongside Joss Whedon for the theatrical cut and Zack Snyder and Will Beall for the 2021 director's cut for Warner Bros. He completed another screenplay, A Foreigner, based on an article by the journalist David Grann. Terrio also co-wrote the script for Star Wars: The Rise of Skywalker with director J. J. Abrams.

== Early life and education ==
Terrio was raised in a Catholic family in Staten Island, and graduated from St. Joseph by the Sea High School. He is of Italian, Irish, and Acadian descent. He graduated in 1997 from Harvard University, where he studied English literature and German phenomenology, lived in Adams House, and participated in the Harvard Radcliffe Dramatic Club and the Hasty Pudding Theatricals.

Terrio attended University of Cambridge for his MLitt, but eventually decided to enroll in film school. He received his master's degree from the USC School of Cinematic Arts in 2002.

== Career ==
=== Directing ===
At age 26, Terrio directed the feature film Heights (Sony Pictures Classics, 2005), which premiered at the Sundance Film Festival. It follows a pivotal twenty-four hours in the interconnected lives of five New Yorkers. It stars Glenn Close, Elizabeth Banks, James Marsden and Jesse Bradford, and features Isabella Rossellini, George Segal and Rufus Wainwright in small roles. It was one of the final films produced by Ismail Merchant and Richard Hawley. The film won a "Best Independent Feature Film Casting" award from the Casting Society of America, USA in 2005.

In 2010, he directed the episode "I Look Like Frankenstein", which was Episode 8 in Season 3 of Damages on FX.

In 2002, he directed, wrote and produced a short film titled Book of Kings, which starred Aasif Mandvi among others. It premiered at the first annual Tribeca Film Festival in 2002.

=== Screenwriting ===
Terrio wrote the script for Argo, winning the Academy Award for Best Adapted Screenplay for the screenplay, and the Writers Guild of America Award for Best Adapted Screenplay. His screenplay was also nominated for Best Screenplay awards from the Golden Globes and the BAFTA Awards. For the Argo screenplay, he also won Best Screenplay or Best Adapted Screenplay honors from the Los Angeles Film Critics Association Awards, the Online Film Critics Society Awards, the Austin Film Critics Association, the Phoenix Film Critics Society Awards, the San Diego Film Critics Society Awards, the Southeastern Film Critics Association Awards, the 2013 University of Southern California (USC) Scripter Award, and the Kansas City Film Critics Circle Awards. He loosely adapted the screenplay based on a Wired article by Joshuah Bearman titled "The Great Escape" and the memoir of Tony Mendez, The Master of Disguise, supplementing that material with extensive research of his own.

Terrio recalls the experience of writing a dialogue-intensive scene for Argo:

Scene 58--nine men sitting in a conference room talking through scenarios for cover stories to get Americans out of Iran--was difficult. There's nothing to cut to except the actors' faces. The tension has to come from the subtle shifts of power. CIA and State Department officials debate ideas, each worse than the last. I knew the crucial beat would come when our hero, Tony Mendez, speaks up. He couldn't seem disrespectful, yet he had to make his case. I settled on the idea that Mendez would throw a spitball into the conversation with a joke about giving the bicycle escapees Gatorade. The table would go silent. The attention of the room would shift to the court jester. I also had to determine whether Gatorade was on the market and a commonly recognized brand in December 1979. I celebrated when I found a magazine from the year before featuring a dehydrated athlete with a Village People moustache: 'Gatorade: When You're Thirsty to Win.'

Terrio also had previously written the screenplays for two films he directed: the feature film Heights, which screened at the Sundance Film Festival, and the award-winning short film Book of Kings.

Terrio re-wrote David S. Goyer's script for Warner Bros.' Batman v Superman: Dawn of Justice (2016), and also wrote the screenplay for the ensemble film Justice League (2017). On January 30, 2017, it was announced that Terrio had performed a re-write on Ben Affleck's script for an untitled Batman movie, which Affleck co-wrote with DCEU co-runner and producer Geoff Johns.

Terrio has also been hired by Paramount Pictures and Indian Paintbrush to write the script for the drama A Murder Foretold, based on an article in The New Yorker by David Grann related to a number of high-profile murders in Guatemala. Terrio hopes to direct his own screenplay.

Terrio has completed the adaptation of Harlan Coben's novel Tell No One for Warner Bros., with Ben Affleck being attached to direct. Guillaume Canet has already directed a French film in an independent adaptation of this novel.

In addition, Terrio wrote a screenplay for a film adaptation of Richard II, which director James Ivory intends to film in 3D.

On September 12, 2017, it was announced that Terrio would be co-writing the script for Star Wars: The Rise of Skywalker with director J. J. Abrams. The film was released on December 20, 2019.

On May 20, 2020, it was announced that Zack Snyder's Justice League would be released on HBO Max in 2021. Terrio is credited with the screenplay and story.

== Other work ==
Terrio has also edited the documentary short First Out.

He worked on the Ivory–Merchant films (directed by James Ivory) Le Divorce and The Golden Bowl. He was also previously an assistant to Ivory.

Terrio also served as an assistant director on the short film Equation, directed by Anuj Majumdar, and was also a grip on the short film Awake, directed by Lori Lovoy-Goran. She won a DGA Student Film Award and a SXSW Competition Award for her documentary short film In Between Days.

== Filmography ==
Year	Title	Director	Writer	Producer	Notes
2002	Book of Kings	Yes	Yes	Yes	Short film; also editor
2005	Heights	Yes	Additional	No	Directorial debut
2010	Damages	Yes	No	No	Television series (episode "I Look Like Frankenstein")
2012	Argo	No	Yes	No	Academy Award for Best Adapted Screenplay; Nominated - BAFTA Award for Best Adapted Screenplay; Nominated - Golden Globe Award for Best Screenplay
2016	Batman v Superman: Dawn of Justice	No	Yes	No	
2017	Justice League	No	Yes	Executive	
2019	Star Wars: The Rise of Skywalker	No	Yes	No	Also voice cameo as "Aftab Ackbar"
2021	Zack Snyder's Justice League	No	Yes	Executive	Director's cut of Justice League

Other credits

Year	Title	Role	Notes
2000	The Golden Bowl	Assistant to James Ivory	
2002	Equation	Assistant director	Short film
2003	Le Divorce	Electronic press kit	
2004	Awake	Grip	Short film
2006	First Out	Editor (segment "Meet Joe Gay")	Documentary
