= Dirty Filthy Love =

2004 British TV drama film

- Written by: Jeff Pope; Ian Puleston-Davies
- Directed by: Adrian Shergold
- Starring: Michael Sheen; Shirley Henderson; Anastasia Griffith; Adrian Bower; Claudie Blakley
- Theme music composer: Martin Phipps
- Country of origin: United Kingdom
- Original language: English

Production
- Producers: Granada Television; Christine Langan
- Running time: 93 minutes

Original release
- Network: ITV
- Release: 26 September 2004

Dirty Filthy Love is a British single television drama starring Michael Sheen as an architect living with obsessive–compulsive disorder (OCD) and Tourette syndrome.

Directed by Adrian Shergold, the film was first broadcast by ITV on 26 September 2004. It was written by Jeff Pope and Ian Puleston-Davies, who has OCD himself. In addition to Michael Sheen, the cast features Shirley Henderson, Anastasia Griffith, Adrian Bower and Claudie Blakley.

Sheen's performance was recognised with a Best Actor nomination at the 2005 British Academy Television Awards and both he and Henderson were nominees for 2005 Royal Television Society Awards. Dirty Filthy Love won the Best Single Drama category at the RTS Awards. It was released on DVD in the United States in 2005 by Hart Sharp Video in association with The Sundance Channel.

== Plot ==
Mark Furness (Sheen), once a successful architect, finds it increasingly difficult to control his "bad habits", such as climbing stairs in a strange sequence, swearing involuntarily and washing himself compulsively. His wife, Stevie (Griffith) asks him to leave their home, so he seeks solace with his best friends Nathan (Bower) and Kathy (Blakley), who take him under their wing.

His life gets even worse when, at a meeting with his employers, he finds himself swearing uncontrollably and loses his job. Accepting that he is unwell, Mark visits a doctor, already convinced he is suffering from a brain tumour or meningitis. In the doctor's waiting room, another patient, Charlotte (Henderson), recognizes Mark's "habits" as symptoms of obsessive–compulsive disorder and Tourette syndrome, and invites him to a local self-help group she runs. Mark finds it comforting that others share his disorder and with Charlotte's help, hopes to face his problems and win his wife back.

Mark tries to beat his disease and begins to make some progress despite the news that his wife is petitioning him for divorce. While meeting her to discuss terms – after covering himself in chocolate powder to combat his obsessive cleanliness – Mark and Stevie have sex. Mark interprets this as a sign that they will be reunited, but Charlotte warns it is nothing but "sympathy sex", leading to an argument between the friends. Mark storms off to see Stevie, but realizes Charlotte was right when Stevie refuses to see him and noticing she is with another man in their marital house.

This plunges Mark into depression. His disorders deteriorate and, cutting contact with his friends completely, he moves into a rundown bedsit. His situation gets worse still when (now with unkempt hair, matted beard and shabby clothes) he begins to stalk Stevie, convinced she has begun a relationship with another man. Almost unrecognizable, he even attacks his friend Nathan on the street thinking that Stevie is having an affair with him after seeing them hug. Nathan restrains Mark and tells him that she only asked to see him that very day, and that She wants Mark to stop phoning and stalking her otherwise she will call the police on him.

Nathan contacts Charlotte and tells her of Mark's current state and she goes to see Mark and offer him comfort. Then helps clean up his new home and his appearance. She then suggests they go for a drive to the seaside and Mark has her drive to the beach where Stevie's parents live in an attempt to try and find Stevie and the man she has seeing. But Charlotte scolds Mark insisting that Stevie is nothing but an "obsession" and that he has to move on. Mark shows Charlotte a piece of architecture he admires and she reveals her talent for playing violin. The two share a kiss but Mark runs back to Stevie's parents home, upsetting Charlotte.

Despite being ejected by Stevie's dad, Mark sneaks into the back garden where a party is going on. Seeing Stevie with her new partner Gareth, the man who took over Mark's office job. He demands to know why Stevie did not tell him. A disgusted Stevie requests his removal, Gareth tries to lead Mark away but Mark head-butts Gareth into the pool. Stevie yells at Mark causing him to collapse in a state on the floor. Charlotte arrives to comfort Mark and tries talk sense to Stevie, who just ignores all Charlotte's explanations and rudely orders them to leave. Charlotte slaps Stevie for her cruelty to Mark, in retaliation Stevie pulls Charlotte's long hair, which is really a wig worn to disguise her hair loss from trichotillomania; she runs off in tears.

Mark, finally seeing sense, takes back the wig and asks Stevie why she came to him the afternoon they had sex. Stevie calmly tells him that she only wanted things to go back to normal and have "her Mark" back. Mark declares that he had always had OCD and always will, and bids Stevie farewell. He finds a tearful Charlotte on the beach and, recognizing her true worth, they begin a romantic relationship themselves.

== Cast ==
- Michael Sheen as Mark
- Shirley Henderson as Charlotte
- Adrian Bower as Nathan
- Claudie Blakley as Kathy
- Anastasia Griffith as Stevie
- Katie McGuinness as Alison
- Anton Lesser as Charles
- Ebe Sievwright as Tom
- Elliot Cowan as Gareth
- Rupert Young as Josh
- John O'Mahony as Dr. Dunphy
- Daniel Kruyer as Cabbie
- Stewart Wright as Rhori
- Bhasker Patel as Hasim
- Kika Markham as Geraldine
- Mercedes Grower as Gemma
- Tim Stern as Kenneth
