= The Quatermass Experiment (film) =

2005 live remake of the 1953 TV series

- Genre: Science fiction thriller
- Created by: Nigel Kneale
- Written by: Richard Fell
- Directed by: Sam Miller
- Starring: Jason Flemyng; Adrian Dunbar; David Tennant; Indira Varma; Mark Gatiss
- Composer: Tim Atack
- Country of origin: United Kingdom
- Original language: English

Production
- Executive producer: Richard Fell
- Producers: Bill Boyes; Alison Willett
- Cinematography: Alan Stewart
- Running time: 97 minutes

Original release
- Network: BBC Four
- Release: 2 April 2005

Related
- The Quatermass Experiment

The Quatermass Experiment is a 2005 live television film remake of the 1953 television series of the same title by Nigel Kneale.

== Casting ==
Jason Flemyng was cast as Quatermass, with long-time Kneale admirer Mark Gatiss as Paterson, Andrew Tiernan as Carroon, Indira Varma as his wife Judith, David Tennant as Briscoe, Adrian Bower as Fullalove and Adrian Dunbar as Lomax—as a Ministry of Defence official rather than a policeman. Isla Blair was cast as Home Secretary Margaret Blaker, a combination of parts of Lomax's character and two officials from the original serial, and she brought to rehearsals a photograph of her husband Julian Glover on the set of the 1967 film version of Quatermass and the Pit. Blair said that she was delighted to be joining "the Quatermass club".

Original 1953 cast member Moray Watson, who had played Marsh, one of Quatermass's colleagues, visited the set during rehearsals. The 76-year-old was invited to make a cameo appearance in the live broadcast, but was not available that evening. It was during the rehearsals for The Quatermass Experiment that David Tennant was offered the role of the Tenth Doctor in Doctor Who. This casting was not announced to the public until later in April, but his fellow castmembers and crew became aware of the speculation surrounding Tennant; in the live broadcast Jason Flemyng changed Quatermass's first line to Tennant's Dr Briscoe from "Good to have you back, Gordon" to "Good to have you back, Doctor" as a deliberate reference.

== Production ==
The remake was commissioned as part of a "TV on Trial" season being run by BBC Four, examining past television trends and productions. Although it was scheduled in a two-hour slot, the production finished after one hour and forty minutes—under running its allotted time, whereas most of the original episodes had overrun. This was expected before transmission, however, after timings had been made at the dress rehearsal, and the increased pace was attributed to the nervousness involved in a live performance.

Adapted from the original scripts by executive producer Richard Fell, the new broadcast was directed by Sam Miller. Kneale acted as a consultant. Fell and producer Alison Willett had several meetings with the writer at his London home to discuss the script. Science writer and film maker Christopher Riley also acted as an advisor on the project, helping to bring the science references in the script up to date. Although Miller controlled the production's artistic direction, experienced outside broadcast director Trevor Hampton assisted him in controlling the technical aspects of the live production, which was broadcast from the QinetiQ (ex-Ministry of Defence) Longcross Test Track site in Surrey. The story was structurally very close to the original, although set in a slightly distorted version of the present day. The climax was moved from Westminster Abbey to the Tate Modern, as the latter was easier to replicate in studio, and there was no visible monster.

== Cast ==
- Jason Flemyng as Professor Bernard Quatermass
- Mark Gatiss as John Paterson
- Andrew Tiernan as Victor Carroon
- Indira Varma as Judith Carroon
- David Tennant as Doctor Gordon Briscoe
- Adrian Bower as James Fullalove
- Adrian Dunbar as Lomax
- Isla Blair as Home Secretary Margaret Blaker

== Broadcast and reception ==
The production was the BBC's first live made-for-television drama broadcast in over twenty years. The broadcast suffered only a few errors, with some fluffed lines, several on- and off-camera stumbles, background sounds occasionally obscuring the dialogue, and, at the programme's end, a cameraman and sound man appearing in the shot. As the end credits rolled, the cameras showed actors celebrating and congratulating each other; they did not know that they were still on air. However, this could be interpreted as the characters celebrating their survival at the end of their ordeal. On two occasions near the middle of the broadcast a large on-screen graphic was overlaid, advising viewers that a major news story, the death of Pope John Paul II, was being covered on BBC News 24.

Drawing an average audience of 482,000, The Quatermass Experiment became BBC Four's fourth-highest-rated programme of all time, behind The Curse of Steptoe, The Road to Coronation Street. and The Alan Clark Diaries. Critic Nancy Banks-Smith in The Guardian complimented the production, and noted that "there were minor bumps in this production. One actor dried ... Another made a crashing exit through piles of broken glass left by the monster ... The last scene is still gripping ... I always said Nigel Kneale was a prophet". She also commented that, for Tennant, "this was a useful dummy run for ... Doctor Who, playing a doctor confronted with a man-eating vegetable". In The Times, Sarah Vine wrote that The Quatermass Experiment, "despite not always succeeding dramatically, did, however, serve as a reminder of how a clever story, a good script and some decent acting can be just as effective as millions of pounds' worth of special effects". Texas Monthly magazine commented it "is an interesting British experience from across the pond ... highly gripping and worth a watch".

== Other media ==
The production was released on DVD in October 2005 by DD Home Entertainment, with an audio commentary and other extra features, as well as some recuts. It has also been repeated on BBC Four on several occasions.

== See also ==
- The Quatermass Xperiment for the 1955 film
