= The Heart Is a Lonely Hunter (Once Upon a Time) =

- Once Upon a Time episode
- Episode no.: Season 1 Episode 7
- Directed by: David M. Barrett
- Written by: Edward Kitsis; Adam Horowitz
- Original air date: December 11, 2011

Guest appearances
- Giancarlo Esposito as Magic Mirror/Sidney Glass; Meghan Ory as Ruby/Red Riding Hood; Scott Heindl as Bartholomew

Episode chronology
← Previous "The Shepherd"	Next → "Desperate Souls"
- Once Upon a Time season 1

"The Heart Is a Lonely Hunter" is the seventh episode of the first season of the American fairy tale/drama television series Once Upon a Time, and the seventh overall. The episode was co-written by series creators Adam Horowitz and Edward Kitsis, while being directed by David M. Barrett. Horowitz and Kitsis had intended to kill off Graham since the pilot episode was picked up, believing that it would add "stakes" to the series and show viewers that the story is "not in Henry's head." The episode is considered significant, as Graham's death reveals that Regina is aware of her fairytale past.

The series takes place in the fictional seaside town of Storybrooke, Maine, in which the residents are actually characters from various fairy tales that were transported to the "real world" town by a powerful curse. This episode's story follows Sheriff Graham (Jamie Dornan) as he remembers his fairytale counterpart, leading to significant consequences that parallel his previous life as the Huntsman. It first aired in the United States on ABC on December 11, 2011. An estimated 8.91 million viewers watched the episode, placing third in its timeslot behind NBC and CBS. The episode received mixed reviews from television critics, as some praised Dornan's character but were divided on the ending sequence. It was the series' mid-season finale.

== Title card ==
A wolf stalks through the forest.

== Plot ==
=== In the characters' past ===
In the Enchanted Forest, the Evil Queen pretends to mourn the death of her husband in front of orphaned Snow White. Snow (Goodwin) and the Queen seemingly comfort each other over the loss. The Queen consults with her Magic Mirror (Esposito) after she admits to him that she herself is responsible for his death, to ask how she can kill Snow, who is beloved by the people but a threat to her bid for the throne. She says that the king's knights will not kill his daughter, and the mirror tells her that she needs a huntsman. The Huntsman (Dornan) and his wolf-brother seem to enjoy living a peaceful life in the woods. The Huntsman kills only for himself to live and has no compassion for humans, who do not understand the wild. As the Huntsman and his wolf enter a tavern, the other patrons begin harassing him, prompting him to successfully defend himself. His performance is viewed in the magic mirror by the Queen, who is greatly impressed. She summons the Huntsman to offer him anything he wants on the condition that he brings her Snow's heart. He agrees to this deal, in return asking for the protection of all the wolves in her Enchanted Forest kingdom.

Snow and the Huntsman walk together in the forest, and she sees through his disguise and correctly guesses that he was sent by the Queen to kill her. Snow flees, but as the Huntsman catches up with her, he finds her writing a letter, which she requests he deliver to the queen after she is killed. The Huntsman takes out his knife, but instead of killing her, he fashions a whistle out of a bamboo stick, telling her that it will summon help and then telling her to run. The Huntsman then returns to the queen with a deer heart, hoping that she will not know the difference. The queen asks him to read her the letter, which is an apology for past wrongs as well as a request from Snow that her stepmother rules the kingdom with compassion. The queen burns the letter and takes the box with the heart in it to store in her vault. When she cannot open one of her storage safes, it proves that the Huntsman lied to her and the heart is not human. The Queen yanks his own glowing heart out of his body and orders her guards to drag him to her chamber. She tells the Huntsman that from now on he will be her "pet" and will do her bidding forever. If he ever betrays her, all she has to do is squeeze his heart.

=== In Storybrooke ===
In Granny's Cafe, Sheriff Graham (Jamie Dornan) throws darts at a picture of a deer very accurately. Emma Swan (Jennifer Morrison) arrives but leaves immediately because she has not forgiven him for hiding his relationship with Regina (Lana Parrilla). Emma attempts to avoid conversation, but Graham is insistent on explaining to her he feels nothing for Regina. He kisses Emma and suddenly sees a vision of a wolf, only to have Emma push him away. Frustrated by Emma's lack of understanding, Graham, drunk, later has sex with Regina. In the middle of the night, he awakens abruptly from a dream of a deer and a wolf. When Graham tells Regina that the dream felt like a memory, Regina tries to convince him to stay, telling him that he's still drunk, but Graham leaves. As Graham attempts to get to his car, the wolf from his visions appears next to him, startling him before it leaves. As he tries to find the wolf in the woods, he runs into Mr. Gold (Robert Carlyle). Graham tells him about the wolf, and Mr. Gold suggests to him that dreams are memories from another life.

The following morning, Emma discovers flowers on the table and throws them out, assuming they are from Graham, but Mary Margaret (Ginnifer Goodwin) says that they were hers from Dr. Whale (David Anders), with whom she had a one-night stand. Emma is glad to hear that Mary Margaret appears to be getting over David (Josh Dallas). Mary Margaret tells Emma that it is obvious that she has feelings for Graham, but does not acknowledge them because she is putting up a "wall" to keep herself from getting hurt.

The sheriff finds the wolf in the woods, and when he whistles, the wolf goes to him. As he pets the wolf's head, he sees himself holding a knife, about to hurt the woman he only knows as Mary Margaret. Graham pays a visit to her classroom, telling her that he believes they know each other from another life, before Storybrooke. Mary Margaret assumes that the sheriff has been talking to Henry, and while this is not the case, this gives Graham the idea to consult Henry about his book. Meanwhile, at the sheriff's office, Regina shows up and warns Emma to stay away from Graham, apparently jealous of his connection with Emma.

Graham visits Henry (Jared S. Gilmore) and describes his visions, to which Henry replies that he must be the queen's Huntsman. The Huntsman was hired by the Evil Queen to remove Snow White's heart and bring it back to her, but when he does not do so, she removes his heart. Graham later attempts to explain to Emma that he could not feel anything with Regina because he does not have a heart. Graham and Emma then encounter the wolf from Graham's visions and follow it to a graveyard, to the vault marked with a symbol Graham saw in his visions and in Henry's book. Looking for his heart, Graham fervently searches the vault, which turns out to be the tomb of Henry Mills, Regina's father. Regina arrives to place flowers on her father's grave and is furious to find them there.

Regina accuses Emma of stealing the sheriff from her, and Emma responds that Regina has chased everyone away. Graham defends Emma, and the women exchange blows. Later, while Graham cleans Emma's wounds, Regina pushes aside the stone inside the vault, which turns out not to be a tomb after all; the stone reveals a staircase. Emma realizes her feelings for Graham and the two kiss, which brings all the memories to Graham. Meanwhile, Regina opens a storage box in the hidden room and clutches Graham's heart, crushing it to dust, with watery eyes. Graham's last words to Emma are "I remember! Thank you." and then he collapses and dies.

== Production ==
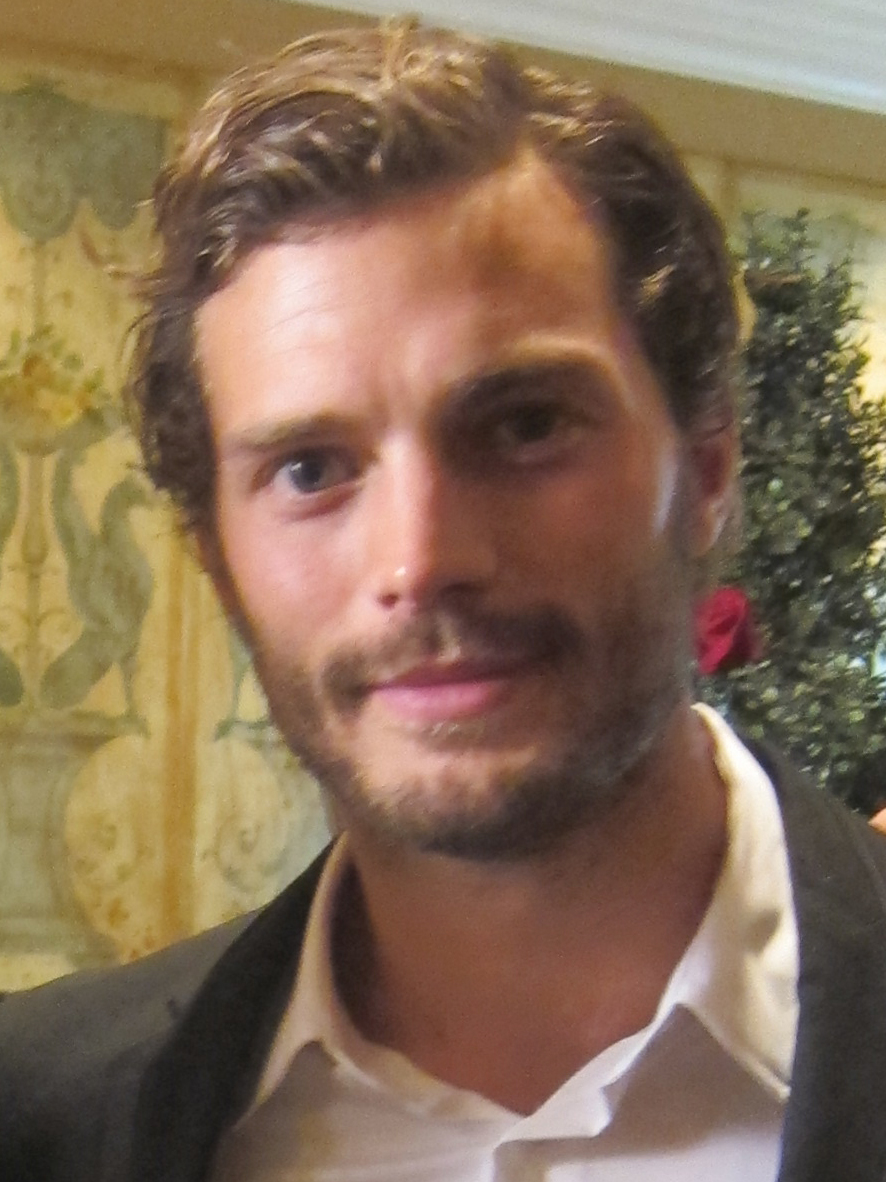
Jamie Dornan commented of his character's exit, "It's pretty gruesome, but you know, it's a little bit cool. Not many people get to die like that... As TV deaths go, I was pretty happy."

The episode was co-written by co-creators Edward Kitsis and Adam Horowitz, and was directed by The Mentalist veteran David M. Barrett. Guest actor Giancarlo Esposito made his second appearance in the series as Magic Mirror/Sidney Glass. Meghan Ory returned as Ruby/Red Riding Hood, while Scott Heindl made his only appearance for the series as Bartholomew. Leading up to the episode broadcast, Kitsis and Horowitz noted that "The Heart Is a Lonely Hunter" would feature consequences of events that occurred in the previous episode. Horowitz explained, "Emma is in a raw emotional place, trying to come to terms with her feelings about what she discovered about Graham. Graham is also in a very raw emotional place because he's clearly conflicted and it's this cauldron of emotions that leads to the kiss." Kitsis added that, "We're really excited that the kiss that you've seen is really just the jumping off point of the story we're telling. It's not like it ends with the kiss, it starts with that and it takes us somewhere that we're excited to show you."

In the episode, the character of Sheriff Graham was killed off, something that actor Jamie Dornan had known would happen since ABC picked up the pilot. It was the first major death of the series. In an interview with E! reporter Kristin Dos Santos, Dornan hinted that while his counterpart in Storybrooke has died, the huntsman could return at some point, as Dornan is still a regular on the series. As much of the episode involves Graham discovering his fairytale past, the writers designed the episode to mislead viewers by having them invest in the character. Kitsis and Horowitz commented that while the death made them "sad," the battle between Emma and Regina requires "stakes and unfortunately, sometimes stakes are people's lives." They also decided to kill the character relatively early in the series in order to show viewers that "it's real. It's not in Henry's head." Kitsis continued, "It’s interesting, but part of the intent was to make you love him and we loved him very much. And the fact that the audience seems to have loved him means a lot to us, in that we feel like we succeeded on that front. If you don’t feel sad, then it was a failure of the execution of the story."

Actress Lana Parrilla believed that Graham helped fill a void for her character, commenting that his loss "was not easy for [Regina]. That’s why, when she crushes his heart, there’s a tear coming out of her eye. She didn’t want to do it, but she had no choice — almost like how she had no choice to kill her father. I’m not saying I agree with it, but for the character, it’s what she had to do." Parrilla also cited "The Heart Is a Lonely Hunter" as the first episode where viewers see "how the two worlds collided," a reference to Regina's ability to kill Graham by squeezing the heart of his fairytale counterpart. The revelation of the vault, Kitsis and Horowitz explained, "is a very important thing for us in terms of moving forward in the season in that we wanted to send a very clear message that Regina knows what’s going on and has some very clear intentions in Storybrooke." The episode was included in Reawakened: A Once Upon a Time Tale – a novelization of the first season – which was published by Hyperion Books in 2013.

== Reception ==
=== Ratings ===
For the third week in a row, the ratings once again slipped, as it placed 2.9/7 among adults aged 18–49 and a 5.2/8 overall, with only 8.91 million viewers tuning in. It ranked third in its timeslot, being beaten by Football Night In America on NBC and 60 Minutes on CBS but ahead of The Simpsons on the Fox network. "The Heart Is a Lonely Hunter" served as the series' mid-season finale, as the next episode aired on January 8, 2012. In Canada, the episode finished in twelfth place for the week with an estimated 1.6 million viewers, a slight increase from the 1.55 million of the previous episode.

=== Reviews ===
"The Heart Is a Lonely Hunter" received mixed reviews from television critics.

TV Fanatic writer C. Orlando enjoyed the episode, remarking "I love Once Upon a Time because it's like a mini-movie every week and I'm completely enthralled by this intriguing other world filled with characters that feel familiar yet completely new." He called the ending scene "heartbreaking." IGN writer Amy Ratcliffe rated the episode 9/10, giving particular praise to Jamie Dornan's ability to be "magnetic in every scene." Ratcliffe called his backstory her favorite fairytale of the series up to that point. Television Without Pity's Cindy McLennan wished they had not killed Graham, but gave credit to the writers for making her care about him. She concluded, "Episodes like this give me strong hope for the second part of this season, one-nighters and all. Bring on the pain, boys." She graded the episode with an A.

Introducing a character as a series regular for several episodes then unceremoniously killing them off has certainly been done before, but this was, by far, Once Upon A Time's darkest moment.

— Entertainment Weekly writer Shaunna Murphy

Blast Magazine columnist Christopher Peck was disappointed that the writers had not yet revealed the reason for the Evil Queen's grudge, commenting, "If the thing that sticks out most about an episode of television is what I didn’t get out, that’s an ominous sign: a foreshadowing that the show has no goddamn clue where it’s headed." He did however enjoy seeing Graham's memories, calling them and the other series flashbacks "the freshest and most thrilling part of the show." While describing Graham's death as "heartbreaking," Peck felt that it "completely nullifies any advancement the episode made." He graded the episode with a C+.

Entertainment Weekly's Shaunna Murphy was a little more critical of the episode, though she did call it "game-changing." Noting that it "felt rushed," she "would have preferred a slow-burning mystery spread out over several episodes over this dramatic, Nikki and Paulo-style stand-alone sendoff." Murphy however concluded that Graham's death was "one of the coolest sequences we've seen so far on this show." The A.V. Club columnist Oliver Sava graded "The Heart Is a Lonely Hunter" with a C. He also noted negative similarities to the television series Lost, explaining, "Remember when Jack, Sawyer, and Kate were stuck in the polar-bear cages, and the plot just wandered in an aimless haze? The time when a bunch of viewers started jumping off because the writers kept adding questions without ever giving answers? What took Lost 44 episodes, OUAT has done in seven." Unlike other reviewers, Sava called the ending a "frustrating conclusion," and believed that "Horowitz and Kitsis [took] one step forward and two steps back with this development."

== Cast ==
=== Starring ===
- Ginnifer Goodwin as Snow White/Mary Margaret Blanchard
- Jennifer Morrison as Emma Swan
- Lana Parrilla as Evil Queen/Regina Mills
- Josh Dallas (credit only)
- Jared S. Gilmore as Henry Mills
- Raphael Sbarge (credit only)
- Jamie Dornan as The Huntsman/Sheriff Graham
- Robert Carlyle as Mr. Gold

=== Guest Starring ===
- Giancarlo Esposito as Magic Mirror/Sidney Glass
- Meghan Ory as Ruby

=== Co-Starring ===
- Scott Heindl as Bartholomew
- Tristan Jensen as Horatio
- Kam Kozak as Black Guard
- Howard Siegel as Tavern Owner
