= Adrian Bower =

British actor and voice over artist (born 1970)

- Born: 20 August 1970 (age 56); Chester, Cheshire, England
- Education: Guildhall School of Music and Drama
- Occupations: Actor, voice over artist

Adrian Bower (born 20 August 1970) is an English actor and voice over artist. He is best known for his role as physical education and geography teacher Brian Steadman in the first three series of the British comedy series Teachers. In 2015, he played Leofric in The Last Kingdom, a British television drama adapted from Bernard Cornwell's historical novels series The Saxon Stories.

== Biography ==
Born in Chester, Cheshire, he studied drama at Guildhall School of Music and Drama, London.

He was the winner of the third series of Celebrity Poker Club, using the nickname "The Tower" in relation to his 6'4" height.

Other television work includes the first series of Gimme Gimme Gimme, the ITV drama series Talk to Me and the 2005 remake of The Quatermass Experiment, which was transmitted live on BBC Four. He also guest-starred in Dirty Filthy Love, Monroe and Rev. and played John Lennon's best friend Pete Shotton in the BBC4 drama Lennon Naked. In 2005 he played Detective Sergeant Tremayne in 'The Guise of Death', an episode from Series Four of The Inspector Lynley Mysteries.

Bower's theatre credits include: Andy in Brassed Off (Royal National Theatre), Heracles in Simon Armitage's adaptation of Euripides classic Mr Heracles (West Yorkshire Playhouse), Steve in Celebration (Chichester) and Dan in Hotel in Amsterdam (Donmar Warehouse). He also played opposite John Simm in Elling at the Trafalgar Studios, Lovbourg in Hedda Gate Theatre.

Bower also played Greg in the Sky Living comedy-drama Mount Pleasant and DC Harihan in Charlie Brooker's A Touch of Cloth.

== Acting credits ==
=== Film ===
Year	Title	Role	Notes
1996	Jude	Blacksmith	
2001	Last Legs	(unknown)	Short film
2007	The Waiting Room	Toby	
2009	Slingers	DM	Video
2012	Hard Boiled Sweets	Gerry	
2013	A Performance	Doctor	Short films
2013	Fink	Brody	Short films
2017	Eat Locals	Private Bower	
2018	Early Days	Steve	Short films
2024	Black Dog	Father	Short films
2025	Snow White	Captain of the Guard	
TBA	The Reformation of Sister Edith	London	Post-production

=== Television ===
Year	Title	Role	Notes
1996	In Your Dreams	Charlie	Television film
1996	The Bill	Mick Hastings	Episode: "Chatterbox"
1996	Casualty	Mark Conrad	Episode: "Mother's Little Helper"
1997	Supply & Demand	Constable	Television films
1997	The Heart Surgeon	ICU Nurse	Television films
1997	Dangerfield	Dr. Ross Freeman	Recurring role, 3 episodes (series 4)
1999	Gimme Gimme Gimme	Joe	Episode: "Legs and Co."
1999–2000	Badger	DC Jim Cassidy	13 episodes (series 1 & 2)
2001–2003	Teachers	Brian Steadman	31 episodes (series 1–3)
2004	The Hotel in Amsterdam	Dan	Television films
2004	Dirty Filthy Love	Nathan	Television films
2005	Faith	Paul	Television films
2005	The Inspector Lynley Mysteries	DC Tremayne	Episode: "In the Guise of Death"
2005	The Quatermass Experiment	James Fullalove	Television film; live-action remake of the 1953 television series
2007	Talk to Me	Scott	Recurring role, 4 episodes
2008	Apparitions	Simon	Mini-series; episode 4
2009	Runaway	Gary	Recurring role, mini-series; 3 episodes
2010	Lennon Naked	Pete Shotton	Television film
2010	Harry & Paul	Liam	Episode: #3.6
2011	Outcasts	James Shapiro	Episode: #1.7
2011	Monroe	Mr. Chadwick	Episode: #1.2
2011	Rev.	Matthew Feld	Episode: #2.4
2011–2017	Mount Pleasant	Greg	Recurring role, 46 episodes (series 1–7)
2012–2014	A Touch of Cloth	DC Des Hairihan	Recurring role, 6 episodes (series 1–3)
2015	Inspector George Gently	Michael Woodruff	Episode: "Gently Among Friends"
2015–2018	The Last Kingdom	Leofric	Recurring role, 10 episodes (series 1 & 3)
2017	Grantchester	Pal	Episode: #3.5
2017	Secret History	Narrator (voice)	Episode: "Britain's Forgotten Army"
2017	Love, Lies and Records	Rob	Recurring role, 6 episodes
2020	Death in Paradise	Brian Hunter	Episode: #9.3
2020	Gangs of London	Mark	5 episodes (series 1)

=== Video games ===
Year	Title	Role	Notes
2009	Killzone 2	Additional Heighast voices	
2009	Risen	Cid / Balturo / Derry (voices)	English version
2010	Fable III	Additional voice	
