= List of Damages episodes =

Damages, a legal drama television series, premiered in United States on July 24, 2007 on the cable network FX. The series, created and produced by brothers Todd and Glenn Kessler with Daniel Zelman, revolves around Patty Hewes (Glenn Close), a senior partner in New York-based law firm Hewes and Associates, and her protégée Ellen Parsons (Rose Byrne). The series involves high-stakes litigation with class action lawsuits involving severe damages.

The first season of the series debuted on July 24, 2007 and consisted of thirteen episodes concluding on October 23, 2007. The second season was delayed due to the 2007–2008 Writers Guild of America strike, and premiered on January 7, 2009. The season, again consisting of thirteen episodes, ended on April 1, 2009. The third season premiered on January 25, 2010 and aired its finale on April 19, 2010. On July 19, 2010, DirecTV announced that, after months of negotiation, Damages would be picked up for two additional seasons consisting of ten episodes each to be aired on the Audience Network beginning in 2011.

Every episode title is a line of dialogue spoken by a character in the episode. During the course of the series, 59 episodes of Damages aired, between July 24, 2007, and September 12, 2012.

== Series overview ==
Season	Episodes	Originally released		
Season	Episodes	First released	Last released	Network
1	13	July 24, 2007	October 23, 2007	FX
2	13	January 7, 2009	April 1, 2009	FX
3	13	January 25, 2010	April 19, 2010	FX
4	10	July 13, 2011	September 14, 2011	Audience Network
5	10	July 11, 2012	September 12, 2012	Audience Network

== Episodes ==
=== Season 1 (2007) ===
No. overall	No. in season	Title	Directed by	Written by	Original release date	US viewers (millions)
1	1	"Get Me a Lawyer"	Allen Coulter	Todd A. Kessler & Glenn Kessler & Daniel Zelman	July 24, 2007	3.66
2	2	"Jesus, Mary and Joe Cocker"	Greg Yaitanes	Todd A. Kessler & Glenn Kessler & Daniel Zelman	July 31, 2007	2.93
3	3	"And My Paralyzing Fear of Death"	John David Coles	Todd A. Kessler & Glenn Kessler & Daniel Zelman	August 7, 2007	2.06
4	4	"Tastes Like a Ho-Ho"	Larry Trilling	Mark Fish	August 14, 2007	2.12
5	5	"A Regular Earl Anthony"	Jean DeSegonzac	Todd A. Kessler & Glenn Kessler & Daniel Zelman & Mark Fish	August 21, 2007	2.15
6	6	"She Spat at Me"	Mario Van Peebles	Mark Fish	September 4, 2007	3.55
7	7	"We Are Not Animals"	Dan Attias	Aaron Zelman	September 11, 2007	N/A
8	8	"Blame the Victim"	Guy Ferland	Willie Reale and Davey Holmes	September 18, 2007	1.70
9	9	"Do You Regret What We Did?"	Thomas Carter	Todd A. Kessler & Glenn Kessler & Daniel Zelman	September 25, 2007	1.17
10	10	"Sort of Like a Family"	Timothy Busfield	Mark Fish & Jeremy Doner	October 2, 2007	N/A
11	11	"I Hate These People"	Ed Bianchi	Adam Stein	October 9, 2007	N/A
12	12	"There's No 'We' Anymore"	Mario Van Peebles	Todd A. Kessler & Glenn Kessler & Daniel Zelman	October 16, 2007	1.38
13	13	"Because I Know Patty"	Todd A. Kessler	Todd A. Kessler & Glenn Kessler & Daniel Zelman	October 23, 2007	1.69

=== Season 2 (2009) ===
No. overall	No. in season	Title	Directed by	Written by	Original release date	US viewers (millions)
14	1	"I Lied, Too"	Todd A. Kessler	Todd A. Kessler & Glenn Kessler & Daniel Zelman	January 7, 2009	1.72
15	2	"Burn It, Shred It, I Don't Care"	Jean de Segonzac	Todd A. Kessler & Glenn Kessler & Daniel Zelman	January 14, 2009	1.14
16	3	"I Knew Your Pig"	Constantine Makris	Todd A. Kessler & Glenn Kessler & Daniel Zelman	January 21, 2009	0.76
17	4	"Hey! Mr. Pibb!"	Mario Van Peebles	Aaron Zelman	January 28, 2009	1.03
18	5	"I Agree, It Wasn't Funny"	Tate Donovan	Mark Fish	February 4, 2009	0.85
19	6	"A Pretty Girl in a Leotard"	Greg Yaitanes	Adam Stein	February 11, 2009	0.94
20	7	"New York Sucks"	Matthew Penn	Jeremy Doner	February 18, 2009	0.86
21	8	"They Had to Tweeze That Out of My Kidney"	Michael Pressman	Aaron Zelman	February 25, 2009	0.89
22	9	"You Got Your Prom Date Pregnant"	Ed Bianchi	Mark Fish	March 4, 2009	0.97
23	10	"Uh Oh, Out Come the Skeletons"	Tate Donovan	Todd A. Kessler & Glenn Kessler & Daniel Zelman	March 11, 2009	0.70
24	11	"London. Of Course"	Andy Wolk	Todd A. Kessler & Daniel Zelman	March 18, 2009	0.63
25	12	"Look What He Dug Up This Time"	Matthew Penn	Daniel Zelman & Glenn Kessler	March 25, 2009	0.89
26	13	"Trust Me"	Todd A. Kessler	Glenn Kessler & Todd A. Kessler	April 1, 2009	1.05

=== Season 3 (2010) ===
No. overall	No. in season	Title	Directed by	Written by	Original release date	US viewers (millions)
27	1	"Your Secrets Are Safe"	Todd A. Kessler	Todd A. Kessler & Glenn Kessler & Daniel Zelman	January 25, 2010	1.43
28	2	"The Dog is Happier Without Her"	Matthew Penn	Aaron Zelman	February 1, 2010	1.02
29	3	"Flight's at 11:08"	Tony Goldwyn	Mark Fish	February 8, 2010	1.08
30	4	"Don't Throw That at the Chicken"	Matthew Penn	Jeremy Doner	February 15, 2010	0.87
31	5	"It's Not My Birthday"	Daniel Zelman	Adam Stein	February 22, 2010	0.81
32	6	"Don't Forget to Thank Mr. Zedeck"	Timothy Busfield	Aaron Zelman & Mark Fish	March 1, 2010	0.97
33	7	"You Haven't Replaced Me"	Glenn Kessler	Todd A. Kessler	March 8, 2010	0.92
34	8	"I Look Like Frankenstein"	Chris Terrio	Daniel Zelman	March 15, 2010	0.97
35	9	"Drive it Through Hardcore"	Tate Donovan	Glenn Kessler	March 22, 2010	0.93
36	10	"Tell Me I'm Not Racist"	David Tuttman	Todd A. Kessler	March 29, 2010	0.65
37	11	"All That Crap About Your Family"	Matthew Penn	Daniel Zelman	April 5, 2010	0.75
38	12	"You Were His Little Monkey"	Timothy Busfield	Glenn Kessler	April 12, 2010	0.76
39	13	"The Next One's Gonna Go in Your Throat"	Todd A. Kessler	Todd A. Kessler & Glenn Kessler & Daniel Zelman	April 19, 2010	0.91

=== Season 4 (2011) ===
No. overall	No. in season	Title	Directed by	Written by	Original release date
40	1	"There's Only One Way to Try a Case"	Todd A. Kessler	Todd A. Kessler & Glenn Kessler & Daniel Zelman	July 13, 2011
41	2	"I've Done Way Too Much for This Girl"	Todd A. Kessler	Nancy Fichman & Jennifer Hoppe-House	July 20, 2011
42	3	"I'd Prefer My Old Office"	Nick Gomez	Jason Wilborn	July 27, 2011
43	4	"Next One's on Me, Blondie"	Timothy Busfield	Joe Weisberg	August 3, 2011
44	5	"We'll Just Have to Find Another Way to Cut the Balls Off of This Thing"	David Tuttman	Nancy Fichman & Jennifer Hoppe-House	August 10, 2011
45	6	"Add That Little Hopper to Your Stew"	Timothy Busfield	Jason Wilborn	August 17, 2011
46	7	"I'm Worried About My Dog"	Glenn Kessler	Josh Payne	August 24, 2011
47	8	"The War Will Go on Forever"	Nick Gomez	Todd A. Kessler & Glenn Kessler & Daniel Zelman	August 31, 2011
48	9	"There's a Whole Slew of Ladies with Bad Things to Say About the Taliban"	David Tuttman	Todd A. Kessler & Glenn Kessler & Daniel Zelman	September 7, 2011
49	10	"Failure is Lonely"	Glenn Kessler	Todd A. Kessler & Glenn Kessler & Daniel Zelman	September 14, 2011

=== Season 5 (2012) ===
No. overall	No. in season	Title	Directed by	Written by	Original release date
50	1	"You Want to End This Once and For All?"	Matthew Penn	Todd A. Kessler & Glenn Kessler & Daniel Zelman	July 11, 2012
51	2	"Have You Met the Eel Yet?"	Colin Bucksey	Hans Tobeason	July 18, 2012
52	3	"Failure is Failure"	Jean de Segonzac	Arthur Phillips	July 25, 2012
53	4	"I Love You, Mommy"	Marcos Siega	Jason Wilborn	August 1, 2012
54	5	"There's Something Wrong With Me"	Tate Donovan	Hans Tobeason	August 8, 2012
55	6	"I Need to Win"	Daniel Zelman	Josh Payne	August 15, 2012
56	7	"The Storm's Moving In"	Tate Donovan	Todd A. Kessler & Glenn Kessler & Daniel Zelman	August 22, 2012
57	8	"I'm Afraid of What I'll Find"	Ken Girotti	Hans Tobeason	August 29, 2012
58	9	"I Like Your Chair"	Steve Shill	Todd A. Kessler & Glenn Kessler & Daniel Zelman	September 5, 2012
59	10	"But You Don't Do That Anymore"	Glenn Kessler	Todd A. Kessler & Glenn Kessler & Daniel Zelman	September 12, 2012
