= List of Damages characters =

This is a list of the characters featured on Damages created by the writing and production trio of Daniel Zelman and brothers Glenn and Todd A. Kessler.

== Main characters ==
Characters are listed by the order in which the characters were introduced into the show. "Starring seasons" refers to the season in which an actor or actress received star billing for playing a character. "Recurring seasons" identifies a season in which an actor or actress appeared.

Actor	Name	Starring seasons	Recurring seasons
Glenn Close	Patty Hewes	1, 2, 3, 4, 5	
Rose Byrne	Ellen Parsons	1, 2, 3, 4, 5	
Tate Donovan	Tom Shayes	1, 2, 3	
Ted Danson	Arthur Frobisher	1	2, 3
Željko Ivanek	Ray Fiske	1	2, 3
Anastasia Griffith	Katie Connor	2	1
Noah Bean	David Connor	1	2, 3, 5
William Hurt	Daniel Purcell	2	
Marcia Gay Harden	Claire Maddox	2	
John Doman	Walter Kendrick	2	
Timothy Olyphant	Wes Krulik	2	3
Campbell Scott	Joe Tobin	3	
Martin Short	Leonard Winstone	3	
John Goodman	Howard T. Erickson	4	
Dylan Baker	Jerry Boorman	4	
Ryan Phillippe	Channing McClaren	5	

== Main ==
=== Patricia "Patty" Hewes ===
- Played by: Glenn Close
- Season 1–5
- Episode Count: 59
- 2-Time Emmy Award winning and Golden Globe Award winning performance

=== Ellen Parsons ===
- Played by: Rose Byrne
- Season 1–5
- Episode Count: 59
- 2-Time Emmy Award nominated and 2-Time Golden Globe Award nominated performance

=== Thomas "Tom" Shayes ===
- Played by: Tate Donovan
- Season 1–3
- Episode Count: 39

=== Arthur Frobisher ===
- Played by: Ted Danson
- Season 1–3
- Regular S1, recurring 2, 3
- Episode Count: 22
- 3-Time Emmy Award and Golden Globe nominated performance

=== Raymond "Ray" Fiske ===
- Played by: Željko Ivanek
- Season 1–3
- Episode Count: 16
- Emmy Award winning performance

=== Katie Connor ===
- Played by: Anastasia Griffith
- Seasons 1 & 2
- Recurring S1, Regular S2
- Episode Count: 16

=== David Connor ===
- Played by: Noah Bean
- Season 1–3
- Regular 1, Guest 2, 3 & 5
- Episode Count: 15

=== Wesley "Wes" Krulik ===
- Played by: Timothy Olyphant
- Season 2
- Guest 3
- Episode Count: 10

=== Daniel Purcell ===
- Played by: William Hurt
- Season: 2
- Episode Count: 10
- Emmy Award and Golden Globe Award nominated performance

=== Claire Maddox ===
- Played by: Marcia Gay Harden
- Season: 2
- Episode Count: 7

=== Joseph "Joe" Tobin ===
- Played by: Campbell Scott
- Season: 3
- Episode Count: 13

=== Leonard Winstone ===
- Played by: Martin Short
- Season 3
- Episode Count: 13
- Emmy Award nominated performance

=== Howard T. Erickson ===
- Played by: John Goodman
- Season 4
- Episode Count: 10

=== Gerald "Jerry" Boorman ===
- Played by: Dylan Baker
- Season 4
- Episode Count: 10
- Critics' Choice Award nominated performance

=== Channing McClaren ===
- Played by: Ryan Phillippe
- Season 5
- Episode Count: 10

== Recurring/guesting roles ==
=== Michael Hewes ===
- Played by: Zachary Booth
- Recurring Season 1–5
- Episode Count: 30

=== Phil Grey ===
- Played by: Michael Nouri
- Season: 1–4
- Episode Count: 19

=== Detective Victor Huntley ===
- Played by: Tom Noonan
- Season: 2–4
- Episode Count: 17

=== Detective Rick Messer ===
- Played by: David Costabile
- Season: 1–2
- Episode Count: 14

=== Agent Werner ===
- Played by: Glenn Kessler
- Season: 1 & 2
- Episode Count: 13

=== Peter "Uncle Pete" McKee ===
- Played by: Tom Aldredge
- Season: 1–2
- Guest: 3
- Episode Count: 12

=== Chris Sanchez ===
- Played by: Chris Messina
- Season: 4-5
- Episode Count: 16

=== Bill Herndon ===
- Played by: Judd Hirsch
- Season: 4-5
- Episode Count: 14

=== Hollis Nye ===
- Played by: Philip Bosco
- Season: 1 & 2
- Episode Count: 11

=== Malcolm ===
- Played by: Michael Pemberton
- Seasons: 1–3
- Episode Count: 10

=== Walter Kendrick ===
- Played by: John Doman
- Season: 2
- Episode Count: 10

=== Agent Harrison ===
- Played by: Mario van Peebles
- Season: 2
- Episode Count: 10

=== Marilyn Tobin ===
- Played by: Lily Tomlin
- Season: 3
- Episode Count: 10
- Emmy Award nominated performance

=== Gregory Malina ===
- Played by: Peter Facinelli
- Season: 1
- Episode Count: 9

=== George Moore ===
- Played by: Peter Riegert
- Season: 1
- Episode Count: 9

=== Deniece Parsons ===
- Played by: Debra Monk
- Season: 1-5
- Episode Count: 12

=== Dave Pell ===
- Played by: Clarke Peters
- Season: 2
- Episode Count: 8

=== Jill Burnham ===
- Played by: Wendy Moniz
- Season: 2 & 3
- Episode Count: 8

=== Anthony Carter ===
- Played by: Derek Webster
- Season: 4
- Episode Count: 8

=== Roger Kastle ===
- Played by: Michael Gaston
- Season: 1, 3, 5
- Episode Count: 8

=== The Deacon ===
- Played by: Darrell Hammond
- Season: 2
- Episode Count: 7

=== Stuart Zedeck ===
- Played by: Dominic Chianese
- Season: 3
- Episode Count: 7

=== Wayne Sutry ===
- Played by: Brett Cullen
- Season: 2
- Episode Count: 7

=== Rutger Simon ===
- Played by: John Hannah
- Season: 5
- Episode Count: 10

=== Gitta Novak ===
- Played by: Gillian Alexy
- Season: 5
- Episode Count: 10

=== Lila DiMeo ===
- Played by: Carmen Goodine
- Season: 1
- Episode Count: 6

=== Tessa Marchetti ===
- Played by: Vanessa Ray
- Season: 3
- Episode Count: 6

=== Kate Franklin ===
- Played by: Janet McTeer
- Season: 5
- Episode Count: 9

=== Larry Popler ===
- Played by: Victor Arnold
- Season: 1
- Episode Count: 5

=== Danielle Marchetti ===
- Played by: Mädchen Amick
- Season: 3
- Episode Count: 5

=== Josh Reston ===
- Played by: Matthew Davis
- Season: 2 & 3
- Episode Count: 5

=== Louis Tobin ===
- Played by: Len Cariou
- Season: 3
- Episode Count: 5

=== Julian Decker ===
- Played by: Keith Carradine
- Season: 3
- Episode Count: 5

=== Sean Everett ===
- Played by: Bailey Chase
- Season: 4
- Episode Count: 5

=== Nassim Marwat ===
- Played by: Usman Ally
- Season: 4
- Episode Count: 4

=== Naomi Walling ===
- Played by: Jenna Elfman
- Season: 5
- Episode Count: 7

=== Rachel Walling ===
- Played by: Alexandra Socha
- Season: 5
- Episode Count: 5

=== Gary Parsons ===
- Played by: Gordon Clapp
- Season: 1,3,5
- Episode Count: 4

=== Lyle Hewes ===
- Played by: M. Emmet Walsh
- Season: 5
- Episode Count: 3
