= Damages (TV series) =

American legal thriller television series

- Genre: Legal drama; Psychological thriller; Crime; Mystery; Drama
- Created by: Todd A. Kessler; Glenn Kessler; Daniel Zelman
- Starring: Glenn Close; Rose Byrne; Željko Ivanek; Noah Bean; Tate Donovan; Ted Danson; Anastasia Griffith; Marcia Gay Harden; Timothy Olyphant; William Hurt; Campbell Scott; Martin Short; Dylan Baker; John Goodman; Ryan Phillippe
- Opening theme: "When I Am Through with You" by The VLA
- Country of origin: United States
- Original language: English
- No. of seasons: 5
- No. of episodes: 59 (list of episodes)

Production
- Executive producers: Todd A. Kessler; Glenn Kessler; Daniel Zelman
- Production location: New York City
- Running time: 39–63 minutes
- Production companies: Gotham Music Placement; KZK Productions; FX Productions (seasons 1–3); Sony Pictures Television; DirecTV Original Entertainment (seasons 4–5)

Original release
- Network: FX
- Release: July 24, 2007 – April 19, 2010
- Network: Audience Network
- Release: July 13, 2011 – September 12, 2012

Damages is an American legal thriller television series created by writing and production trio Daniel Zelman, Glenn Kessler, and Todd A. Kessler. It premiered on July 24, 2007, on FX and aired for three seasons before moving to the DirecTV channel Audience Network in 2010, airing for two further seasons, and concluding in 2012.

The plot revolves around the brilliant, ruthless lawyer Patty Hewes (Glenn Close) and her newest protégée, recent law school graduate Ellen Parsons (Rose Byrne). Each season features a major case that Hewes and her firm take on, while also examining a chapter of the complex relationship between Ellen and Patty. The first two seasons center on the law firm Hewes & Associates in New York City, while later seasons focus more on Patty and Ellen's relationship and Ellen’s attempts to distance herself from Hewes & Associates, both personally and professionally.

The series is known for its depiction of season-long cases, from the point of view of both the law firm and an opponent. It is also noted for the technical merit of its writing, including its effective use of plot twists and non-linear narrative. It has received critical acclaim and various award nominations, with Close and Željko Ivanek winning Primetime Emmy Awards for their performances. Other established actors in the cast include Ted Danson, Tate Donovan, William Hurt, Marcia Gay Harden, Timothy Olyphant, Martin Short, Lily Tomlin, John Goodman, Ryan Phillippe, Dylan Baker, Janet McTeer, and John Hannah.

== Plot ==
=== Series overview ===
Season	Episodes	Originally released		
Season	Episodes	First released	Last released	Network
1	13	July 24, 2007	October 23, 2007	FX
2	13	January 7, 2009	April 1, 2009	FX
3	13	January 25, 2010	April 19, 2010	FX
4	10	July 13, 2011	September 14, 2011	Audience Network
5	10	July 11, 2012	September 12, 2012	Audience Network

=== Season one ===
The regular cast consists of Glenn Close, Rose Byrne, Ted Danson, Tate Donovan, Željko Ivanek and Noah Bean.

A young woman, Ellen Parsons, is found running through the streets half-naked and covered in blood. During the ensuing police investigation, her fiancé, David, is found in the couple's apartment, bludgeoned to death, and Ellen is arrested.

Six months earlier, Ellen, a newly minted lawyer, is being courted for prestigious jobs. She turns down an offer to work with the defense attorney Hollis Nye (Philip Bosco). Ultimately, she chooses a job at Hewes & Associates, headed by notorious lawyer Patty Hewes. When Nye finds out about this, he warns Ellen of the dangers of working for Patty and asks her to sign his business card. Ellen later notices he wrote, "I was warned,” above her signature.

Ellen becomes engrossed in a major case that Hewes & Associates is pursuing. Patty has been retained in a class action lawsuit by the former employees of billionaire Arthur Frobisher (Ted Danson). In a case reminiscent of the Enron scandal, Frobisher is accused of insider trading and lying to his employees about his company's health, even as he unloaded hundreds of millions of his own stock, depriving his employees of their retirement funds and benefits. Early in the season, Patty shows she is willing to go to extreme, unethical, and illegal lengths to win her case. As the season progresses, Ellen becomes increasingly involved in the case and in Patty's tradecraft.

Ellen deduces that one reason she was hired was her personal connection to the case; her fiancé's sister turns out to be an important witness. Throughout much of the season, Ellen skirts the edges of unethical behavior, and she eventually crosses that line. As Ellen becomes increasingly devoted to the case, her relationship with her fiancé, David, becomes strained. The situation worsens when Patty betrays his sister. Eventually, Ellen and David tire of Patty, and Ellen publicly leaves Hewes & Associates. Nevertheless, she maintains an interest in the case and soon becomes personally and professionally embroiled in it again.

Throughout the first season, the series plays with time. Instead of unfolding in the present and showing flashbacks of the past, the main narrative unfolds several months in the past and is interspersed with flashes of events that are taking place in the present. These flashes gradually reveal that Ellen's fiancé, David, has been murdered and that Ellen, while staying at Patty's apartment, appears to have been attacked.

By the finale of the first season, the past-tense main narrative of the show has caught up with the flashes of the present, and most of the questions raised by those flashes have been resolved. The murder charges against Ellen are dropped. The identities of David's murderer and Ellen's attacker are revealed to the audience, and the Frobisher case is resolved. As a result, Frobisher gives two billion dollars of his personal fortune to the employees, in exchange for a guarantee that no criminal charges will be filed against him. He is later shot and left for dead by a former employee, whom he had double-crossed earlier by manipulating him for information.

=== Season two ===
Glenn Close, Rose Byrne, and Tate Donovan return as regulars in the second season of the series. Season one recurring star Anastasia Griffith became a regular, while season one regular Ted Danson returned for five episodes. William Hurt, Timothy Olyphant and Marcia Gay Harden also joined the regular cast, while John Doman guest starred.

Once naive young attorney Ellen Parsons talks to an unknown person off-screen. Suddenly, she pulls out a gun before pulling the trigger twice.

Six months earlier, an old acquaintance of Patty's, scientist Daniel Purcell (William Hurt), convinces Patty to take a case involving a conspiracy between Purcell's scientific firm and a huge energy corporation, Ultima National Resources (UNR). Patty's initial refusal to assist Purcell is understood better when it is revealed that Purcell is the father of Patty's son, Michael, a relationship she abused to win a case during Michael's childhood. Currently, Purcell is having an affair with Patty's opponent in the courtroom, Claire Maddox (Marcia Gay Harden), the attorney of UNR's CEO. On a similar note, a partner in UNR, Dave Pell (Clarke Peters), conspires against her with Patty's husband, Phil, while Phil is also having an extramarital affair. When Phil's affair is anonymously leaked to the press (found to be by Patty), Patty kicks him out of their apartment. Ellen, still believing Patty had tried to have her killed, deals with her past by attending group grief counseling sessions and working with the FBI to bring Patty down. Patty's partner Tom Shayes, whose wife is pregnant with a son, continues to be in the dark on certain issues regarding cases. Eventually, Ellen uses Tom to further the FBI investigation, causing him to get fired in the process.

Similar to the first season, the majority of the narrative is past tense, with glimpses of the present. This season gradually reveals it is Patty that Ellen held at gunpoint, attempting to force the truth out of her. Several minutes after Ellen fires the gun, Patty is found bleeding in the elevator.

In the season finale, Ellen convinces Patty to bribe the judge to accept evidence that would otherwise be inadmissible, in a setup to incriminate Patty. At the same time, Patty makes a deal with Pell to call off the FBI and hand over the data proving UNR is using toxic chemicals. In return, Patty will drop the energy trading angle of the case. She also sets up Ellen to take the fall for bribing the judge. Ellen, meanwhile, procures a handgun. After destroying the FBI cameras in the room by shooting them, Ellen confronts Patty about her actions from season one, leaving to bribe the judge after Patty confesses that she was responsible for the attempted murder of Ellen. Soon thereafter, Patty is found bleeding in the elevator. Here, it is revealed that before her confrontation with Ellen, Patty was stabbed by Fin Garrity. When Ellen bribes the judge, her FBI handler arrests both her and the judge. As they leave, US Marshals arrest the corrupt agent Ellen was assisting, freeing Ellen.

One month later, Patty is recovering at home, Tom is returning to Patty's firm, and Ellen has a new job offer. Patty says Ellen will return.

=== Season three ===
Glenn Close, Rose Byrne, and Tate Donovan returned as regulars for the third season. Season 1 regular Ted Danson returned for five episodes. Martin Short and Campbell Scott joined the cast. Lily Tomlin and Keith Carradine special guest starred.

Patty is the victim of a car crash. The other car belongs to Tom Shayes, who is found dead in a dumpster. Ellen is implicated in Tom's murder because her blood-stained purse is found in the hands of a homeless man near the dumpster. When a detective questions Ellen, they discuss what the homeless man said, and the detective asks whether Ellen and Tom were romantically involved. Ellen replies, "We were starting a law firm together".

Six months earlier, Patty Hewes is tackling a new case. Appointed a trustee by the US government, she is tasked to recover billions of dollars lost to the largest investment fraud in Wall Street history: a fraudulent Ponzi scheme run by Louis Tobin (Len Cariou), a Bernie Madoff-type. Patty believes Tobin has hidden the money and that members of his family, specifically his loyal son Joe (Campbell Scott) and daughter Carol, secretive wife Marilyn (Lily Tomlin), and trusted attorney and family friend Leonard Winstone (Martin Short) know much more than they claim. Tom has a personal involvement because he invested in the Tobin fund and lost his savings and those of his parents and in-laws, which makes his work on the case a conflict of interest. Ellen, meanwhile, has stayed true to her promise not to return to Patty's firm and has avoided contact for the past year that she has been working at the District Attorney's office. Ellen runs into Tom, and she mentions she is having trouble cracking a drug case. Soon afterward, Ellen's case is suddenly resolved under suspicious circumstances, and she receives a package from Hewes & Associates containing an expensive Chanel bag from Patty (the same bloodstained bag that ends up in the hands of the homeless man). Believing Hewes & Associates is more capable than the D.A. to bring about restitution for the victims, Ellen begins to secretly cooperate with Patty and Tom, and they all get drawn into the Tobin family's world of deceit.

Patty and Ellen's bond resurfaces as they work on the case together. Throughout the third season, Ellen tries to prove that she can get to and manipulate Patty, which Patty figures out through Ellen's manipulation of her replacement at Hewes & Associates: a young, ambitious lawyer named Alex.

Ellen and Patty each deal with family crises. Patty learns her son, Michael, and his girlfriend Jill, who is at least 15 years his senior, are expecting a baby. At the end of the season, Jill finds herself in custody for having sex with a minor and about to lose her freedom and custody of the baby. Toward the end of the season, it is revealed that the car that hit Patty was driven by Michael, who was enraged by Patty's having Jill arrested. Meanwhile, Ellen's sister is arrested on a drug charge. Also revealed is an old and painful secret Patty has been keeping for years, about her daughter, Julia. Through memories and dreams Patty repeatedly sees herself, highly pregnant, walking up to a ranch with horses and a man she briefly talks to. He asks what she's doing so far away from her home in her condition, and Patty replies her doctor said she'd be okay. However, the doctor actually told Patty she must stay in bed and avoid any physical activity, or else the baby will die. Following Tom's funeral, Patty indirectly admits to Ellen that she brought on a miscarriage so she could go to New York and accept an important job offer, thus beginning her climb to the top of the legal profession. Ellen then asks, "Is it worth it?" Patty does not reply, and Ellen leaves.

=== Season four ===
Glenn Close and Rose Byrne returned as regulars for the fourth season. John Goodman and Dylan Baker joined the cast. Chris Messina guest starred.

The fourth season opens to reveal Ellen's new job at another law firm (the same firm she was offered a position at in season one). Ending Ellen's search for a career-defining case, she begins researching and gathering witnesses for a wrongful-death suit against private military contractor Howard T. Erickson (John Goodman), who heads the "HighStar" security company. Erickson made his fortune supplying the U.S. government with security forces in Afghanistan and is protected by his connections within the highest echelons of power in Washington, D.C. During a high school reunion, Ellen enlists her old friend Chris Sánchez (Chris Messina), a HighStar employee, as her key witness. Unfortunately, the law firm Ellen works for, fearful of repercussions, rejects the case, forcing Ellen to seek resources for the case elsewhere. After Patty sees Ellen harassed by a supporter of HighStar while she and Ellen have lunch together, she offers Ellen everything necessary to file the case. As the case unfolds, Jerry Boorman (Dylan Baker), an opportunist deeply tied to Erickson and the CIA, works all angles to prevent the case from progressing, fearful that his true involvement in the wrongful-deaths will be discovered.

Once the case is clearly resolved, Ellen and Patty meet in Manhattan in a spot overlooked by the Statue of Liberty. Ellen is angry because Patty put Chris in danger by continuing the case despite her protest. In response, Patty offers Ellen her hand claiming that they "can do great things together". Ellen refuses and says goodbye.

=== Season five ===
Glenn Close and Rose Byrne returned as regulars for the fifth and final season. Ryan Phillippe joined the main cast. Chris Messina, Jenna Elfman, Janet McTeer and John Hannah guest starred.

After four seasons of manipulation and deceit that cross professional and personal lines, season five sets the stage for the final showdown between Patty and Ellen. In a storyline inspired by the vicissitudes of the whistleblower website WikiLeaks and its founder Julian Assange, Channing McClaren (Ryan Phillippe) is a computer expert and the iconoclastic founder of a website, McClarenTruth.org, devoted to government and corporate transparency. It is shown, in the premiere, that Ellen and Patty are set to go head to head in a case over the death of Ms. Walling (seen to have been attacked by two anonymous people), as Patty claims that McClaren murdered her, as well as stealing personal information and posting it on his site.

The final season opens with Patty walking into her office to see her granddaughter sitting at her desk drawing. Patty says to her, "Get out of Mommy's chair." The girl responds, "You're not my mommy." When Patty approaches the desk, Ellen appears in place of the girl, saying, "I love you, Mommy." The end of the season premiere depicts Patty being questioned by the police about Ellen's disappearance. Ellen is shown in an alley, unconscious and bleeding. While this case is occurring, Michael organizes a custody case over Catherine, with Ellen agreeing to testify against Patty after the McClaren case was over. Also, in Ellen's personal life, her mother has left her father after he threw something at her and she was scared. She lived in Ellen's apartment for a while before moving into her own apartment, only to move back in with Ellen.

The McClaren case continues, with both Ellen and Patty being contacted by a hacker named Samurai Seven. He sold information to both of them about the involvement of Princefield in Naomi's death. However, only Patty receives this information and then Samurai Seven is found dead in a burnt-out car. In court, Ellen suspects that Patty has a personal relationship with the judge, which seems to be confirmed when Patty receives a personal call from him. However, once Ellen has raised attention to this and removed the judge from the case, Patty reveals that it was all a setup, and that she and the judge disliked each other. When Ellen finds out that Patty has received the Princefield information, she tells the new judge and Patty is forced to give Ellen the information, losing her leverage on the case.

When questioning Naomi's daughter, Patty finds out that Naomi and McClaren possibly had a sexual relationship and so Patty goes to the media and accuses McClaren of rape. This results in both Ellen and Patty being given a gag order. Soon after, McClaren offers Naomi's daughter a settlement and she wants to take it. Ellen and Patty team up to give false evidence so that the settlement is rejected and the case continues. Ellen and Patty are both given a chance to ask questions of an expert in the data breach but have to travel to him. Once the interview is over, Ellen finds out that her flight is cancelled and Patty invites her onto her private flight, which has been delayed. While waiting in the airport, Ellen and Patty discuss the attempted murder of Ellen and the confession that Patty made. Patty says that the accusation was false and that the confession was a lie because she was at gunpoint.

Rutger Simon is revealed to be the one who intentionally leaked Naomi Walling's personal e-mails, hoping to implicate McClaren as the leaker so he can take control of McClarentruth.org. Simon convinces Patty Hewes to become an investor in the site when he takes over in exchange for his testimony against Channing McClaren, Helmut Torben, and Bennett Herreshoff. Patty subsequently informs Ellen of her intention to call Simon as a witness for the Plaintiff. Upon getting this information, Ellen informs Torben (McClarenTruth.org's primary benefactor) of Simon's intention to testify against Channing McClaren and the possibility of Simon implicating both him and Bennett Herreshoff as part of his testimony and suggests having Simon taken out of the picture. In a meeting with Torben and Herreshoff, Simon informs them that he intends to testify against Channing McClaren but promises not to implicate either of them in his testimony.

After booking an emergency flight out of the country to Dublin, Simon is killed by hitmen hired by Herreshoff and Torben. On the day of the trial, shortly before opening arguments, Patty Hewes is informed that Simon has left the country. Because Simon was Patty's only valuable witness, she drops the lawsuit. Later, Patty suggests that she intentionally gave Ellen her witness list early to see how Ellen handled the information. Patty knew Ellen would share the information with Torben, who would have Simon killed, thus proving, in Patty's eyes, that Ellen has become as manipulative as Patty.

Attention then turns to the custody case. Ellen has the blood that was on the card she had with her the day she was attacked tested and finds out the identity of Patrick (the murderer). Ellen has her investigator track and find him. She offers Patrick immunity if he testifies against Patty. He agrees. The story has now caught up to the future shown in the premiere and Ellen is seen walking to her office through the alley. The scene then cuts to Patrick and the investigator in Ellen's office, worried that Ellen is two hours late. They call the detectives to have Patty arrested. As the two men search the roof, they discover Ellen unconscious in the alley below. As they both seem to run down to help her, only the investigator does as Patrick goes back to the office to find Michael, who has just arrived. As Ellen is being revived, a scan picture is found in her bag, revealing she is pregnant. Once awake, Ellen goes back to her office to find Michael dead, having been shot by Patrick. Patty is told about this in a mimed scene. At the end of the series finale, the final scene takes place "a few years from now" showing Patty entering a shop to find Ellen with her daughter. In her limo, Patty has a vision of Ellen coming to thank her for everything she has done. Instead, Ellen walks away, telling her daughter that she knew "that woman" back when she was a lawyer. Her daughter says Ellen is not a lawyer anymore. Ellen walks with her daughter and tells her that they're going to visit her dad at the VA (the Department of Veterans Affairs) which means the child's father is Chris Sanchez. The scene ends with a closeup on Patty's face; she sits with a stoic expression on her face in silence.

== Cast and characters ==
Actor	Character	Seasons				
Actor	Character	1	2	3	4	5
Glenn Close	Patty Hewes	Main	Main	Main	Main	Main
Rose Byrne	Ellen Parsons	Main	Main	Main	Main	Main
Tate Donovan	Thomas Shayes	Main	Main	Main		
Ted Danson	Arthur Frobisher	Main	Main	Main		
Noah Bean	David Connor	Main	Guest	Guest		Guest
Željko Ivanek	Ray Fiske	Main	Guest	Guest		
Anastasia Griffith	Katie Connor	Recurring	Main			
William Hurt	Daniel Purcell		Main			
Marcia Gay Harden	Claire Maddox		Main			
Timothy Olyphant	Wes Krulik		Main	Guest		
Martin Short	Leonard Winstone			Main		
Campbell Scott	Joseph Tobin			Main		
John Goodman	Howard Erickson				Main	
Dylan Baker	Jerry Boorman				Main	
Ryan Phillippe	Channing McClaren					Main

The series details the mentor-protegee relationship between high-stakes attorney Patty Hewes (Glenn Close) and newly graduated attorney Ellen Parsons (Rose Byrne). During the first three seasons Tom Shayes (Tate Donovan) acts as Patty's associate, right-hand man and later partner. Michael Nouri stars in the first two seasons as Patty's husband Phil Grey, and makes periodic guest appearances in subsequent seasons due to their characters' separation. Zachary Booth's character recurs throughout the series as Patty's damaged son, Michael Hewes.

The first season mainly focused on a case involving Arthur Frobisher, played by Ted Danson, a man blamed for embezzlement and fraud; Željko Ivanek played his regretful attorney Ray Fiske. Noah Bean starred as David Connor, Ellen's fiancé, with Anastasia Griffith recurring prominently as Katie Connor, David's sister and the key witness in the Frobisher case (at the end of the first season Bean and Ivanek leave the main cast with the death of their characters, but still serve as occasional guest stars with their characters appearing in flashbacks). Notable recurring characters during the first season were played by Peter Facinelli, Philip Bosco, and Peter Riegert.

The second season found Patty and her firm inadvertently thrown into a massive case against the billion dollar-worth energy corporation Ultima National Resources (UNR). William Hurt played Daniel Purcell, a mysterious man from Patty's past who initiates the case and puts it in Patty's hands. John Doman played Walter Kendrick (in a billed recurring role), the primary antagonist of the season as the CEO of UNR, while Marcia Gay Harden joined the cast as UNR's misinformed but smart and vicious lead counsel Claire Maddox. On the personal front, Anastasia Griffith returned as Ellen's friend Katie Connor, who helps her in taking down Frobisher, while Timothy Olyphant played a man in grief counseling who bonds with Ellen under ambiguous motives. Returning recurring actors in prominent roles were Ted Danson, David Costabile, Tom Aldredge, Mario van Peebles and Glenn Kessler. Notable recurring characters during the second season were played by Clarke Peters, Brett Cullen, Kevin Corrigan and Darrell Hammond.

The third season, inspired by the Bernie Madoff scandal, tracked Patty's aggressive pursuit of bringing down the disgraced Tobin family after they were revealed to be a part of a Ponzi scheme that ripped off millions of citizens. Campbell Scott played Joe Tobin, the shamed but ultimately spoiled and selfish youngest son of the family. Martin Short played the family's longtime trusted lawyer Leonard Winstone who finds his place in this family changes as the Tobins reveal their true colors. Lily Tomlin special guest starred throughout the season as the secretive matriarch Marilyn Tobin, while Len Cariou appeared as the patriarch of the family blamed for all of the fraud and conspiracy. Returning recurring actors in prominent roles were Ted Danson, and also Timothy Olyphant in a single guest appearance. Notable recurring characters during the third season were played by Dominic Chianese, Mädchen Amick, Ben Shenkman, and Keith Carradine. Wallace Shawn also made a notable guest appearance.

The fourth season, the first without Tate Donovan, followed a wrongful-death suit filed against a military contractor over a mysterious incident in a war zone. John Goodman played Howard Erickson, the CEO of the shadowy military contractor who becomes the defendant against Patty and Ellen over the corruption that occurred in the war zone. Dylan Baker played Jerry Boorman, a mysterious figure with secretive ties to the Middle East. Chris Messina played Chris Sanchez, an old high school friend of Ellen's and a decorated soldier suffering from posttraumatic stress disorder. Notable recurring characters during the fourth season were played by Derek Webster, Griffin Dunne, Judd Hirsch, Fisher Stevens, and Bailey Chase.

The fifth and final season pitted Patty and Ellen against one another in court, with the case surrounding the suit of the founder of a WikiLeaks type of website, Channing McClaren, played by Ryan Phillippe. Jenna Elfman played Naomi Walling, the investment bank employee whose daughter Rachel (Alexandra Socha) sues McClaren after he releases Naomi's personal information along with the financial records she leaked to him - leading to Naomi's suicide (in reality, she was murdered and the suicide faked). Janet McTeer played Kate Franklin, an old colleague of Patty Hewes who teams up with Ellen. John Hannah played Rutger Simon, the gatekeeper of McClaren's website who is devoted to exposing fraud and corporate misconduct. Returning recurring actors in prominent roles were Judd Hirsch and Chris Messina. Notable recurring characters during the fifth season were played by Victor Garber, M. Emmet Walsh, William Sadler, Gbenga Akinnagbe and Gillian Alexy.

== Production ==
=== Conception ===
Creators Todd A. Kessler, Glenn Kessler, and Daniel Zelman developed the series as centering on the relationship between a mentor and a protégée: two women in powerful positions. Although the initial story idea did not have the series set in the legal arena, the creators felt the legal world included women who commanded power and influence. The concept was inspired by the creators' interactions with their superiors and with their experiences in the entertainment industry. Todd Kessler addressed how he views gender as playing into the series' narrative saying, "I don't think we look at the story as, this is a great female story... We see the Patty-Ellen relationship as a universal one between anyone who has had a boss and goes into a job thinking that success is working hard and doing what the boss asks and realizing that it's only a small percentage of it." The setting veers away from typical legal dramas, whose storylines are often set inside courtrooms, and instead it describes the characters' lives and interactions outside the courtroom, thereby focusing on the behind-the-scenes power maneuvering and manipulation. Concerning the characters Zelman notes, "We don't look at any of the characters as good or bad or anything like that. What really motivated us to write about this world, first and foremost, was our interest in power dynamics, the dynamics of power in society."

=== Writing ===
Each season, established lawyer Patty Hewes takes one major case. But seasons often simultaneously deal with other minor cases and later seasons focus more on Ellen's cases rather than Patty's.

==== Storylines and inspirations ====
Season 1 focuses on a class action lawsuit against the fraudulent multi-billionaire CEO of a defunct company; the plot was inspired by various corporate scandals and characters involved in them, most notably the 2001 Enron scandal. Season 2 deals with the energy industry and related environmental issues; the story is influenced by recent and ongoing environmental cases in the United States in the mining industry and by the events of the 2001 California energy crisis. The writers were guided by environmental lawyer Robert F. Kennedy, Jr., who shared his experience in the field with various corporations and CEOs. Season 3 is largely based on the 2009 Bernie Madoff scandal. Season 4 describes events based on the Blackwater Security Consulting scandal.

==== Narrative devices ====
The series uses nonlinear narrative, employing flashforwards, foreshadowing, and red herring narration techniques. This approach has given the writers flexibility in storytelling. The narrative handles multiple plot lines and has loose ends. Zelman explains, "We know where we're going. We have tent-pole moments that we're building to all the way through to the end, and it's very clear to us where we want to end up. [However], we want to leave room for improvisation..." While the two different time-frames format was initially intended for the first season, in preparation for the second season the producers felt that the nonlinear format had become a signature of the series and decided to continue it for the second season. With the serialized format of the show decreasing the viewership, Todd Kessler contended that the second season would contain stand-alone storylines to make the show more accessible.

=== Casting ===
When creators Kesslers and Zelman pitched the show to executives at FX, network president John Landgraf suggested they consider Glenn Close for the main character Patty Hewes. Close had earlier worked on FX's The Shield and had conveyed to the network officials her interest in being cast as a lead in another show, so long as the show was set in New York City. After a three-hour meeting with the creators, Close accepted the role, impressed particularly by the powerful persona of the character "as the head of her own law firm [...] in a male-dominated world". Describing her character, Close said, "Patty is a complicated character... She's not somebody who you can easily characterize. People tend to say she's manipulative and evil, which always makes me laugh, because I think women and power are still problematic, especially in this country. I take that as a compliment." In preparation for the role, Close met with several female attorneys in New York, including Mary Jo White, Lorna Schofield, and Patricia Hynes.

The creators cast Ted Danson for the part of Arthur Frobisher, a corrupt billionaire CEO, because of his role in The Onion Field (1979). Danson was attracted to the project immediately after learning that Close would be playing the lead role. As part of his preparation, Danson studied the collapse of Enron by watching documentaries such as The Smartest Guys in the Room (2005) and meeting CEOs of various Fortune 500 corporations. The producers also suggested that Danson consult Close's acting coach Harold Guskin. Danson was initially hesitant about this suggestion, but found the consultation extremely helpful.

Series cast members Rose Byrne and Tate Donovan, portraying Ellen Parsons and Tom Shayes respectively, secured their parts through auditions. Byrne had been unavailable when she was initially approached because she was shooting the film 28 Weeks Later but auditioned later when the part had not yet been cast. Both Byrne and Donovan prepared for their roles by consulting lawyers and attending court trials. According to producers, the characters of Ellen's fiancé David Connor and his sister Katie were the hardest to cast.

For the first-season cast, Noah Bean, who was cast as David, said he "gave an awful first audition" but managed to get the part when given a second chance while waiting for an elevator. When British actor Anastasia Griffith auditioned for the part of Katie Connor, the producers were hesitant to have a British actor play an American, especially since they already had an Australian (Byrne) playing an American. However, Griffith convinced the producers by speaking in an American accent throughout their follow-up meeting. At the time of casting, Griffith's role was intended only for three episodes, but it was extended after the producers realized the character's success. Željko Ivanek scored the initially very minor role of Ray Fiske through an audition, but as producers watched Ivanek's work in the dailies, they beefed up the role considerably.

For the second-season cast, Marcia Gay Harden was, according to producer Josh Payne, a "no-brainer" for the role of Claire Maddox. They wanted an actress who could hold her own against Close. Harden's casting was also attributable, in part, to the fact that she lived in New York City where Damages shoots. William Hurt and Timothy Olyphant were cast late in the process. The producers debated whether they should go with one actor who created a love triangle involving Patty and Ellen, but they ultimately went with the two separate actors.

For the third-season cast, Lily Tomlin's casting evolved out of her fandom for the show. At an art exhibit she bumped into Damages creator/executive producer Todd A. Kessler and interrogated him for information about upcoming twists on the show. Todd kept her in mind and later cast her as Marilyn Tobin. Dominic Chianese was also cast because of his past relationship with Kessler, as the two worked together on The Sopranos. Martin Short was the last major actor to be cast that season; he too was a Damages fan. Producers were excited to work with Short, though he had very little dramatic work to refer to; he added to the Damages reputation of casting against-type.

For the fourth season cast, producers initially considered actors like Edward Burns and Wentworth Miller for the role of Howard T. Erickson, because they were closer in age/physique to Erik Prince, the founder of Blackwater whom the season was based on. John Goodman stressed his availability, and the role was tailored to suit his style. Zelman saw Dylan Baker on stage years ago when Daniel was an apprentice at the Williamstown Theatre Festival in Massachusetts. His performance left an impression, and producers had thought about casting him several times before, but the timing didn't work out until Season 4, when he was cast as Jerry Boorman. Chris Messina at his first casting call, refused to play a Republican or a lawyer on the show, because he was repeatedly cast in such roles beforehand. He was awarded the role of PTSD-plagued Chris Sanchez and underwent considerable preparation for the role. He would "stay awake and not sleep...and right before action...drink two Red Bulls". He was also reluctant to join a show so late in its run. The role of Bill Herndon was, as with Ray Fiske or Katie Connor's, conceived as a very minor part but was significantly increased after Judd Hirsch made a good impression.

For the fifth-season cast, Ryan Phillippe initially wasn't overly interested in doing Damages, but on a phone call with producers he changed his mind after being told his character was modeled after Julian Assange, with whom Phillippe was fascinated. Jenna Elfman followed in the steps of other well-known comic actors by playing against-type on Damages as Naomi Walling, the victim in a lawsuit. She enthusiastically signed on for the opportunity to "play the types of scenes I haven't yet had the opportunity to play". Janet McTeer became close friends with Glenn Close while working on the film Albert Nobbs (2011), and Close worked with producers to offer her a key role as Kate Franklin, a recent empty nester returning to law.

=== Title sequence ===
The title sequence, set to the song "When I Am Through with You" by The VLA, depicts images of New York City public sculpture, including The Glory of Commerce atop Grand Central Terminal, Civic Fame atop the Manhattan Municipal Building, and Asia in front of the Alexander Hamilton U.S. Custom House. The frieze of the New York County Courthouse is also shown, inscribed with a quote from George Washington, "The true administration of justice is the firmest pillar of good government".

=== Move to DirecTV ===
Due to the low ratings and high costs, it was speculated early that Season 3 might be the show's last. However, Sony reached an agreement with DirecTV to share the cost of future seasons with its Audience Network (formerly The 101 Network and originally Freeview). Other outlets were also approached about sharing the cost of a new season. However, no other network opted to pick it up, leaving Audience Network the new broadcaster. The New York Times reported that FX continued to hold a small stake in the show and that "[The] series offers a way for the Audience Network to define itself as a provider of niche entertainment for an educated, upper-middle-class demographic, an experiment it started by picking up the football drama Friday Night Lights from NBC." Glenn Close said she always thought the show was "kind of a tricky fit for FX," further stating, "I think FX was defined by The Shield, which was a testosterone-laden show, and they continue to be a testosterone-laden network. I think we were kind of off-brand for them." Damages made its first premiere on DirecTV on January 5, 2011. Seasons one through three ran until the season 4 premiere on July 13, 2011.

== Home media ==
All five seasons have been released on DVD in regions 1, 2, and 4, while only the first season was originally released on Blu-ray. Mill Creek Entertainment released the complete series on Blu-ray and DVD on February 26, 2019.

Season	Episodes	Region 1 release date	Region 2 release date	Region 4 release date	Special features
The Complete; First Season	13	January 29, 2008	April 14, 2008	December 19, 2007	Deleted Scenes; The Shield: Final Season Tease; Willful Acts: The Making of Damages; Understanding Class Action: Interactive Guide; Trust No One: Insight from the Creators; Two Episode Commentaries
The Complete; Second Season	13	January 19, 2010	August 31, 2009	November 23, 2009	Deleted Scenes; Four Episode Commentaries; Season 1 Recap; Character Profiles; Post Mortem: Reflecting Back on Season Two
The Complete; Third Season	13	July 12, 2011	October 18, 2010	October 27, 2010	Episode Introductions; Deleted Scenes; Two Episode Commentaries; Damages Season 3 Teaser; Damages Season 3: A Look Back; Bloopers; Directing Damages
The Complete; Fourth Season	10	June 26, 2012	July 16, 2012	September 5, 2012	Deleted Scenes; A Case for War: The Cast and Crew Discuss the Fourth Season; The Evolution of Patty Hewes; Bloopers
The Complete; Fifth and Final Season	10	July 16, 2013	July 15, 2013	August 8, 2013	Deleted Scenes; Outtakes
The Complete; Series	59	October 29, 2013	—N/a	April 1, 2020	Includes all previous extras

Damages is also available on Amazon Prime Video, the iTunes Store, and Disney+.

== Reception ==
=== Critical response ===
The first season of Damages received generally positive reviews from critics with the series ranking in the top ten lists of several critics, who include Robert Abele (LA Weekly), Robert Lloyd (Los Angeles Times), and Alessandra Stanley (The New York Times). TV Guide ranked the season one finale (episode #52) on its list of "TV's Top 100 Episodes of All Time".

Season 2 was met with further critical praise, along with season 3, which Verne Gay (from Newsday) rated A+ and termed it, "Gorgeously acted, written, paced, structured and conceived, it remains one of the best shows on TV--and maybe the most enjoyably addictive." When the series returned for its fourth season in July 2011, after it was saved by DirecTV, Maureen Ryan (of The Huffington Post) reacted positively said "Damages knows what it's about these days. And if you want to see some prime, grade-A acting, well, you could do a lot worse". TV Guide's Matt Roush praised the series and stated that "Damages is worth it. And for those without access to DirecTV, worth the wait."

=== Ratings ===
The series premiere on July 24, 2007, drew 3.7 million viewers, with total of 5.1 million viewers including re-airing on the same night, becoming the most watched cable television program for the night. However, the viewership declined over the first season, partially due to the story's serialized approach, with the season finale drawing 1.4 million viewers. Regardless of its critical acclaim, Damages seriously suffered in its second season ratings. Season Two premiered with only 1.7 million viewers watching, even with the momentum that was built following its Golden Globe and Emmy wins. Despite the show's low ratings, FX picked up and secured the program for a third season. John Landgraf hoped the show would continue on the air following its third season; after taking into account the encore presentations and "extraordinary" DVR numbers, the ratings appeared to be quite good.

The third-season premiere, which aired on January 25, 2010, only managed to draw in 1.483 million viewers. The third-season finale managed to pull in only 960,000 viewers.

=== Awards and nominations ===
Damages won four Emmy Awards, a Golden Globe, a Casting Society of America Award, and a Satellite Award. Additionally, the series was nominated for a Producers Guild of America Award, a Writers Guild of America Award, four Screen Actors Guild Awards, and four Television Critics Association Awards, among others.

For its first season, Damages was nominated for Outstanding Drama Series at the 2008 Primetime Emmy Awards, along with six other nominations. Co-creators Todd A. Kessler, Glenn Kessler, and Daniel Zelman were nominated for writing and Allen Coulter for directing the pilot episode ("Get Me a Lawyer"). Glenn Close received a nomination for Outstanding Lead Actress in a Drama Series, with co-stars Ted Danson and Željko Ivanek nominated for Outstanding Supporting Actor in a Drama Series. Close and Ivanek won in their respective categories, with the series also receiving a Creative Arts Emmy for Outstanding Casting for a Drama Series. The series earned four nominations at the 65th Golden Globe Awards, including Best Television Series – Drama, Close for Best Actress, and Rose Byrne and Ted Danson for their supporting roles. Close won the award in her category.

For its second season, Damages was nominated for seven Primetime Emmy nominations at the 2009 Primetime Emmy Awards, with Glenn Close receiving her second Emmy nomination for Outstanding Lead Actress in a Drama Series. Ted Danson also received another nomination, for Outstanding Guest Actor in a Drama Series. Rose Byrne earned her first Emmy nomination for Outstanding Supporting Actress in a Drama Series and William Hurt was nominated for Outstanding Supporting Actor in a Drama Series. It was also nominated for Outstanding Directing for a Drama Series (Todd A. Kessler for "Trust Me") and received its second and final nomination for Outstanding Drama Series. On September 20, 2009, the show won its fourth Emmy Award when Glenn Close won the Emmy for Outstanding Lead Actress in a Drama Series. The series earned three nominations at the 67th Golden Globe Awards, including Close for Best Actress, and Byrne and William Hurt for their supporting roles.

For its third season, Damages earned its most acting nominations at the 2010 Primetime Emmy Awards. Along with Glenn Close, Rose Byrne, and Ted Danson returning in their respective categories, featured cast additions Martin Short and Lily Tomlin as newly nominated actors. Short was nominated for Outstanding Supporting Actor in a Drama Series and Tomlin was nominated for Outstanding Guest Actress in a Drama Series. For the first time, Damages was unable to win a major Primetime Emmy despite their success in the nominations, as Glenn Close lost for the first time in her category, losing to Kyra Sedgwick.

For its fourth season, Damages earned a Critics' Choice Television Award nomination for Dylan Baker as Best Guest Performer in a Drama Series, a Screen Actors Guild nomination for Glenn Close for Outstanding Performance by a Female Actor in a Drama Series, and a fourth consecutive Emmy nomination for Glenn Close, in the Outstanding Lead Actress in a Drama Series category.

For its fifth and final season, Glenn Close received her third Golden Globe nomination for Best Actress – Television Series Drama, after being absent the previous two years.
