= Anastasia Griffith =

British actress (born 1978)

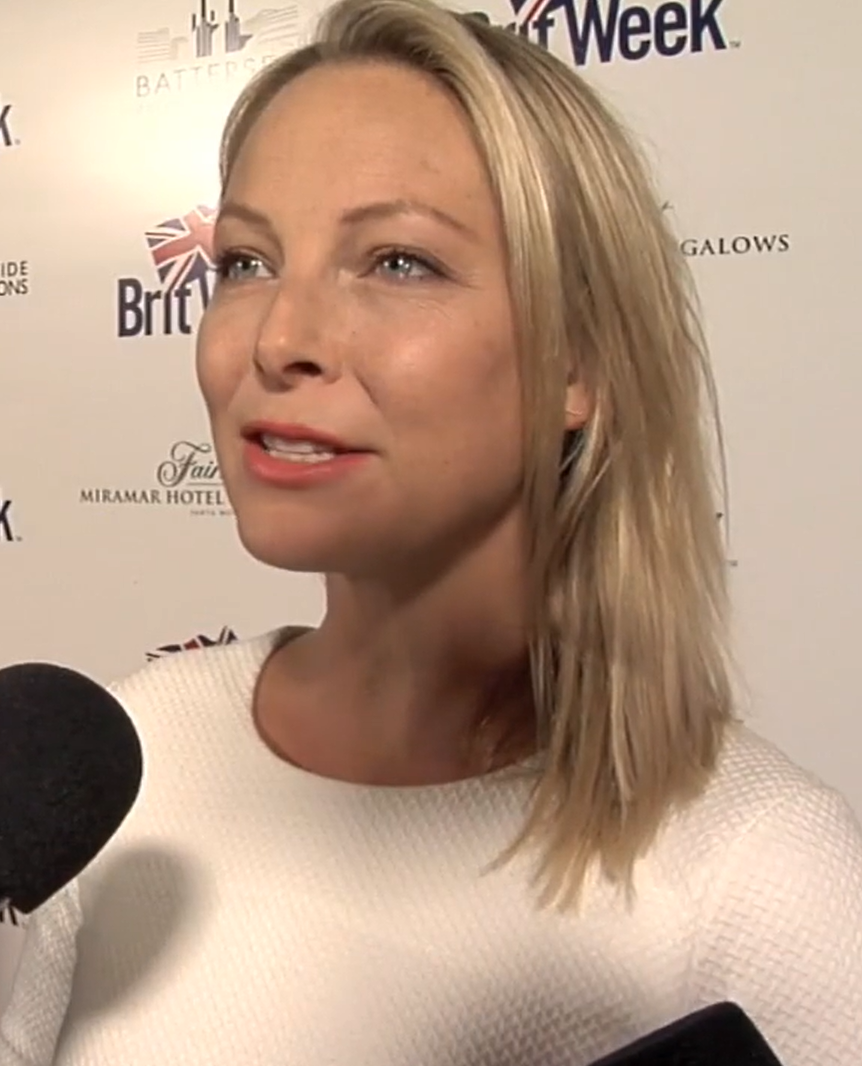
- Griffith in 2015
- Born: 23 March 1978 (age 48); Paris, France
- Education: London Academy of Music and Dramatic Art
- Occupation: Actress
- Years active: 2004–present

Anastasia Griffith (born 23 March 1978) is a British actress. She is known for her roles in Dirty Filthy Love (2004), Alfie (2004), Damages (2007–2009), Solitary Man (2009), Trauma (2009–2010), Royal Pains (2010–2011), Once Upon a Time (2011–2014), Copper (2012–2013), Zoo (2015), and Deep State (2018–2019).

== Early life and education ==
Born in Paris, France, to a mother from Northern Ireland and a father from the United States, Griffith was brought up in west London with six older brothers, one of whom is actor Jamie Bamber.

She completed a degree in the History of Art at the University of Bristol and later trained at the London Academy of Music and Dramatic Art, before moving into acting.

== Career ==
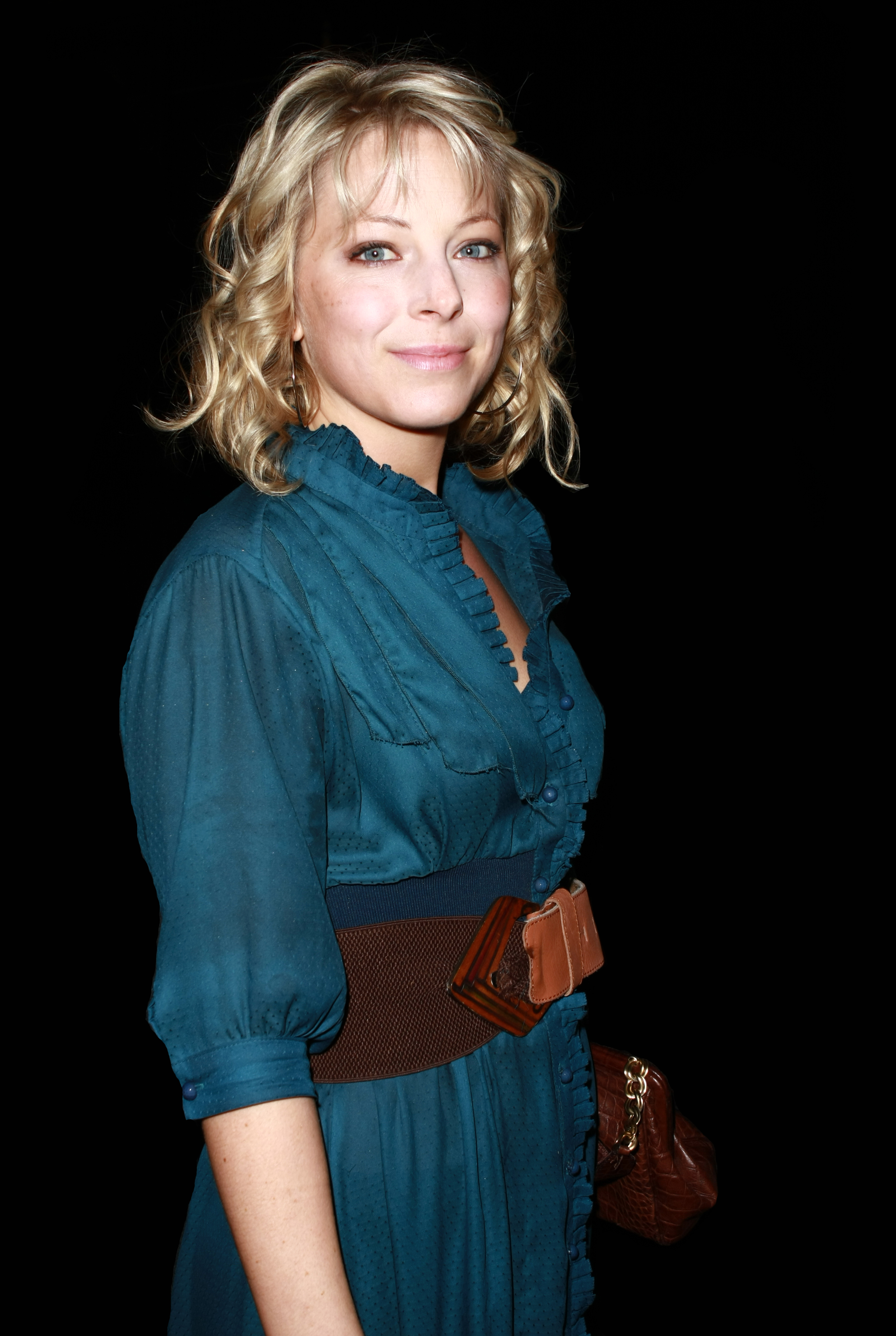
Griffith arriving at the "Lipstick Jungle" Premiere at Saks Fifth Avenue, New York City in 2008

Griffith made her onscreen acting debut in a minor role, in the made-for-television movie She's Gone (2004). Also in 2004, she appeared in more prominent roles in the television movie Dirty Filthy Love, the comedy film Alfie, the short film Turn, and The Headsman. In 2005, she guest-starred in the British comedy The Worst Week of My Life.

Griffith won her role as Katie Connor, on the 2007 television series Damages, after taking a last-minute audition one month after moving to New York City. The role saw her with an imitated American accent; she says "[the producers] were a little concerned at first about a Brit playing an American, especially because they already had an Australian (Rose Byrne) playing an American." So Griffith addressed them in an American accent from the beginning to the end of the audition. Griffith returned to the series as a main cast member for the second season, which aired in 2009.

She guest-starred in an episode of Law & Order: Special Victims Unit, and in the second episode of New Amsterdam, titled "Golden Boy". She was later cast in the NBC medical drama Trauma, which began airing in September 2009. In May 2010, after 18 episodes, NBC officially cancelled the show. Griffith returned on 17 June 2010, at the end of episode 3 season 2 from Royal Pains, as Dr. Emily Peck.

Griffith appeared in the Lifetime television movie And Baby Will Fall (2011), as Ivy Rose.

She can be seen as Elizabeth Haverford Morehouse, the English wife of a wealthy businessman, on the BBC America series Copper.

In 2011, she appeared in the first season of ABC's television series, Once Upon a Time, playing Storybrooke's Kathryn Nolan and her counterpart Abigail.

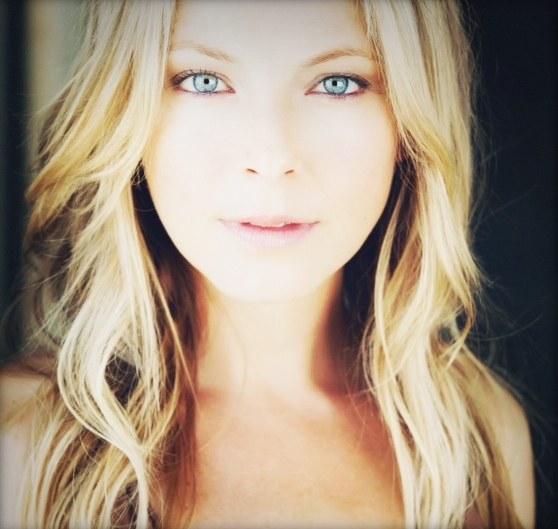
Griffith in 2007

== Filmography ==
Film roles
Year	Title	Role	Notes
2004	Alfie	Chyna	
2004	Turn		Short film
2004	Nature Unleashed: Fire	Sharon	Direct-to-video
2005	The Headsman	Anna	aka. Shadow of the Sword
2009	Solitary Man	Carol Salomonde	
2014	Postman Pat: The Movie	Dr. Sylvia Gilbertson and Lauren Taylor	voice

Television roles
Year	Title	Role	Notes
2004	Disappeared	Hooker	Television movie
2004	Dirty Filthy Love	Stevie	Television movie
2005	The Worst Week of My Life	Cordelia	Episodes: "Monday", "Wednesday"
2007	Law & Order: Special Victims Unit	Leah Keegan	Episode: "Paternity"
2007–2009	Damages	Katie Connor	Recurring role (season 1); main role (season 2); 22 episodes
2008	New Amsterdam	Hannah Cleary	Episode: "Golden Boy"
2008	Lipstick Jungle	Kelly Parker	Episode: "Carpe Threesome"
2008	The Cleaner	Kate Gibbons	Episode: "The Eleventh Hour"
2009	Medium	Samantha Emory	Episode: "The Man in the Mirror"
2009–2010	Trauma	Nancy Carnahan	Main role; 18 episodes
2010–2011	Royal Pains	Dr. Emily Peck	Recurring role; 9 episodes
2011	And Baby Will Fall	Ivy Rose	Television movie
2011–2012, 2014	Once Upon a Time	Kathryn Nolan/Princess Abigail	Recurring role (season 1); 8 episodes
2012–2013	Copper	Elizabeth Haverford	Main role
2013	Banshee	Dr. Paradis	Episode: "A Mixture of Madness"
2014	The Wrong Mans	Agent Miller	Episode: "X-Mans/White Mans"
2015	Elementary	Agatha Spurrell	Episode: "The View From Olympus"
2015	The Mysteries of Laura	Angela Ryan	Episode: "The Mystery of the Fateful Fire"
2015	Zoo	Audra Lewis	3 episodes
2017	The Blacklist	Emma	Episode: "The Harem"
2018–2019	Deep State	Amanda Jones	Main role
2024	Rivals	Helen Gordon	
2025	Robin Hood	Joan Locksley	

Video game roles
Year	Title	Role	Notes
2006	CDX The Game	Liz Hinton	Point-and-click Flash game, in the adventure-mystery genre. Set in ancient Rome.
