= Damages season 4 =

Damages
- Season 4
- Region 1 DVD artwork
- No. of episodes: 10

Release
- Original network: Audience Network
- Original release: July 13 – September 14, 2011

Season chronology
- ← Previous; Season 3 Next → Season 5

The fourth season of the legal drama series Damages premiered on the Audience Network, an entertainment channel owned by DirecTV, on July 13, 2011 and concluded on September 14, 2011. The season featured 10 episodes, bringing the series total to 49. The fourth season was released on DVD in region 1 on June 26, 2012.

The fourth season takes place three years after the Tobin case. Ellen has moved on with her life. Now an attorney working for another NYC firm, she's content with her cases and colleagues. Deep down, however, she wants a bigger challenge. When she discovers an old high-school boyfriend has been through a traumatic experience while working for High Star, a private security firm hired by the U.S. government to carry out special missions in Afghanistan, she suspects foul play and asks Patty for help. Patty knows that trying a case against High Star can make Ellen's career. Or ruin it. The plot was inspired by recent events and controversies surrounding Blackwater Security Consulting.

== Cast and characters ==
=== Main cast ===
- Glenn Close as Patty Hewes
- Rose Byrne as Ellen Parsons
- Dylan Baker as Jerry Boorman
- John Goodman as Howard T. Erickson

=== Recurring cast ===
- Chris Messina as Chris Sanchez
- Derek Webster as Anthony "A.C." Carter
- Li Jun Li as Maggie Huang
- Tom Noonan as Det. Victor Huntley
- Zachary Booth as Michael Hewes
- Bailey Chase as Sean Everett
- Judd Hirsch as Bill Herndon
- David Pittu as Jack Shaw
- Usman Ally as Nasim Marwat
- Fisher Stevens as Dr. Baldwin / Therapist
- Bruce Altman as Jim Girotto
- Rochelle Bostrom as Jerry's Girlfriend
- Griffin Dunne as Dean Gullickson
- Adriane Lenox as Angel Auroro
- Todd A. Kessler as Perry the Doorman
- Michael Nouri as Phil Grey
- Debra Monk as Deniece Parsons

== Episodes ==
| No. overall | No. in season | Title | Directed by | Written by | Original release date |
|---|---|---|---|---|---|
| 40 | 1 | "There's Only One Way to Try a Case" | Todd A. Kessler | Todd A. Kessler & Glenn Kessler & Daniel Zelman | July 13, 2011 |
Three years after the death of Tom Shayes, Ellen Parsons has a new job and a new boyfriend. She now works for Nye, Everett & Polk but feels that the company does not respect her legal input. She begins an interest in Howard Erickson and his private military company, High Star Security. Ellen's high school friend, Chris Sanchez, has recently left High Star and she begins to reconnect with him in order to get closer to the company's secrets. Howard Erickson tries to renew his company's government contracts with help from Jerry Boorman, a ruthless mercenary. Patty, currently in the midst of a lawsuit against a French pharmaceutical giant at Hewes and Associates, advises Ellen not to look into the company, as they are extremely dangerous. Patty struggles to find a nanny for her three-year-old granddaughter, Catherine. In the alternate timeline (three months later), a young Afghan boy brings a sandwich to a person who is tied to a chair with a cloth covering their face. The Afghan boy watches as two masked figures threaten the person's life.
| 41 | 2 | "I've Done Way Too Much for This Girl" | Todd A. Kessler | Nancy Fichman & Jennifer Hoppe-House | July 20, 2011 |
After having the High Star case rejected by Nye, Everett & Polk's senior partners, Ellen is determined to try the case on her own but needs Patty's resources to do so. She refuses to ask Patty for help, not wanting to owe her former boss anything. Erickson and Boorman stage an elaborate scheme to get Sanchez out of the country, which includes the bombing of his therapist's office and an assassination attempt. Sanchez believes he is being targeted by an Afghan man bent on avenging his brother, who was killed by Sanchez and his men during the last High Star mission in Afghanistan. Ellen has a group of friends pretend to threaten her about High Star in front of Patty, who afterwards offers her resources to Ellen. Desperate for answers, Sanchez gets redeployed to Afghanistan in hopes of finding those responsible for the attempts on his life.
| 42 | 3 | "I'd Prefer My Old Office" | Nick Gomez | Jason Wilborn | July 27, 2011 |
Ellen sets herself up at Hewes & Associates and files her case against High Star. Chris provides testimony from Afghanistan via video link, but, after being threatened by Anthony Carter, he reverses his testimony. During the deposition, he sends Ellen a coded message that leads her to a friend of his, a vet who may know more than she thinks she does about the final High Star mission. Meanwhile, Boorman deals with a mysterious detainee in his safe house, presumably the terror suspect who was abducted during the October mission that went wrong. Leaving a sick Catherine with Ellen, Patty departs for Boston with Huntely, who has managed to close in on Michael's possible whereabouts. Their attempts prove unsuccessful, and Patty returns to New York, where Ellen confides in her that she is in over her head with the High Star case and needs Patty's personal help. Unbeknownst to Patty, Michael has returned and is watching her. Three days later, a Muslim man is shown handling a carefully wrapped package and has a map targeting Hewes & Associates. An alternate timeline reveals what happened to Michael after he caused Patty's car accident. He steals a car from his friend and heads to Boston, hoping to stay with a longtime friend, Henry, in his dorm. After being rejected, he spends some time as a homeless man before giving his car to a drug dealer in order to take over his territory on the Boston nightclub scene.
| 43 | 4 | "Next One's on Me, Blondie" | Timothy Busfield | Joe Weisberg | August 3, 2011 |
The Muslim man turns out to be Nassim Marwat, a friend of Sanchez's who presents Ellen with Chris' military medallion and offers her information about what is happening in Afghanistan. Through contacts in the Muslim-American world, Boorman is able to determine Marwat's identity and uses it to pressure Howard Erickson into giving the order to have Anthony Carter torture Chris for information about what Marwat knows. Meanwhile, Patty and Ellen turn to Bill Herndon (Judd Hirsch), a drunken colleague of Patty's with Washington contacts, who says he can give them further information about High Star's activities in the Middle East. He reveals to Patty that High Star was extracting terrorist suspects for the CIA.
| 44 | 5 | "We'll Just Have to Find Another Way to Cut the Balls Off of This Thing" | David Tuttman | Nancy Fichman & Jennifer Hoppe-House | August 10, 2011 |
Ellen and Patty have decided to move Nasim to a safer place. Boorman poses as a cab driver. Just as Ellen and Nasim are about to enter Boorman’s cab, Victor Huntley and a security team pick them up and take them to Hewes & Associates. Patty tells Ellen about Herndon’s discovery on Dust Devil. She also informs Ellen about the CIA's involvement, which means their phones could be bugged. Ellen connects "DD" with "Dust Devil." Catherine falls ill, and Patty consults with Dr. Weisler, who orders tests for the toddler, so Patty hires a nurse. Erickson meets with Jack Shaw about the new witness, Nasim. They suspect Sanchez sent Nasim over from Afghanistan. Boorman meets with his girlfriend, who is a French intelligence officer. Patty and Ellen prep Nasim for the deposition. Shaw warns Erickson that the Dust Devil papers have been requested in discovery from Ellen. Erickson meets with a DOD official to discuss the discovery requests and reminds him that it’s best to conceal the information. Boorman tries to blow up Ellen’s bus, but the bomb is discovered. The FBI tests hair found on the bomb, and arrests Nasim — Boorman set him up. Nasim is incarcerated.
| 45 | 6 | "Add That Little Hopper to Your Stew" | Timothy Busfield | Jason Wilborn | August 17, 2011 |
Patty is still worried about Catherine's health. Nasim is in a federal detention center. He is now useless as a witness because he was labeled a terrorist. Herndon tells Patty and Ellen that the CIA must have helped frame Nasim. Erickson and Shaw meet with Department of Defense officer Trent Prowse, who wants to make sure Erickson can handle the $100 million contract coming his way. Erickson is also planning on purchasing land for his new training facility. Michael comes to see Patty and demands to see Catherine; Patty considers it. Ellen calls Patty from her old cell phone, knowing that it’s tapped, and asks Patty to meet her in the park. Patty and Ellen meet while Herndon secretly takes photos of the area. Boorman is unknowingly photographed but not yet identified. Patty tells Michael she knows of his past and that he’s not ready to be a father. He needs to prove to her that he's changed before he can see Catherine. Ellen finally agrees to speak with the Times correspondent who's been trying to contact her, and asks for his help in tracking down Chris in Afghanistan. Patty receives a court summons — Michael is suing her for custody of Catherine.
| 46 | 7 | "I'm Worried About My Dog" | Glenn Kessler | Josh Payne | August 24, 2011 |
Patty continues therapy sessions with Dr. Baldwin. Boorman tells Erickson that Nasim was deported, and he wants Erickson to make a decision about Sanchez — keep him locked up or dispose of him. Herndon meets with Patty and Ellen. They ask him to use his CIA contact and investigate the man in the photo (Boorman) who met with Nasim. Patty must let Ellen run with things while she addresses the pharmaceutical case. Michael meets with Patty, who has received his court summons. Patty warns him that he doesn’t want to fight her in court. Michael asks Patty to give Catherine a stuffed Panda to make up for him missing Christmas and her birthday, but Patty refuses to take the gift. Later, Michael approaches Catherine and Angel on the street and gives her the toy himself. Ellen goes to the cemetery to meet Herndon’s CIA contact, but he is killed before the meeting. Patty meets with French billionaire Coupet and his lawyer Girotto, who tells her off the record that he wants to settle under pressure from the French government. Patty refuses and begins the deposition. After receiving a call from Ellen, Patty tells Coupet she will accept a settlement after all, if he accepts her terms: one billion dollars and intelligence information from his government. Erickson goes to Afghanistan and tries to reason with Sanchez, but they argue, and Erickson attacks him. Patty and Girotto sign the settlement papers, and Girotto gives Patty a flash drive containing information on Boorman, provided by the French government. Patty and Ellen review the files pertaining to Boorman up until early 2010. They discover that Dust Devil was shut down, but Erickson and Boorman conducted an unsanctioned rogue mission.
| 47 | 8 | "The War Will Go on Forever" | Nick Gomez | Todd A. Kessler & Glenn Kessler & Daniel Zelman | August 31, 2011 |
Dean, the reporter that Ellen has been talking to, meets with a contact in Afghanistan and asks him to help him look for Chris Sanchez. Boorman arrives at the safe house to find his girlfriend waiting for him. She had been following him to prove that she could learn his secrets, and discovered that the terror suspect he's been imprisoning is just a child. She asks who the boy is and why he’s locked up. Boorman angrily throws her out. Patty informs Ellen that Shaw filed a motion to dismiss, and the judge wants a hearing that afternoon. Ellen is worried about her argument to keep the case going with two witnesses now gone. Patty agrees to join her at the hearing. At the hearing, Patty persuades the judge to let the case go forward. The judge grants Ellen’s request to depose Erickson. Ellen handles the first round of the deposition and successfully gets Erickson angry. Dean tells Ellen that locals are aware that a few High Star men were killed in a mission in October. He’s still working on finding out more, but can’t push too hard, too fast. He later finds out that someone wants to kill a High Star employee. Boorman talks nicely to the boy and asks him what happened to his mother, but he remains silent. Patty meets with Boorman’s girlfriend. She tells Patty that if she gives her some information, it must remain a secret. Patty agrees, and she gives her an envelope. Patty surprises Erickson when she takes the lead on the second day of the deposition. Patty informs him that the last Dust Devil mission was to seize a boy. Erickson is stunned and confronts Boorman with this. Boorman meets with his girlfriend in a hotel room, where he then kills her. At the end, he calls Patty and offers to give up everything on Erickson.
| 48 | 9 | "There's a Whole Slew of Ladies with Bad Things to Say About the Taliban" | David Tuttman | Todd A. Kessler & Glenn Kessler & Daniel Zelman | September 7, 2011 |
Afghan men hired by one of Erickson’s men transport Sanchez in the trunk of a vehicle without AC’s knowledge. AC angrily calls Erickson and demands to know why he’s not in the loop on moving Sanchez. Boorman meets with Patty to explain his history with Erickson. He tells her "Dust Devil" was a way for the U.S. to distance itself from handling terror suspects after Abu Ghraib. In exchange for Erickson’s services, Boorman agreed to keep government contracts coming. Boorman confirms to Patty that the CIA shut down Dust Devil well before the last mission, and claims the C.I.A. can no longer control Erickson. They are happy to let Patty "take him off their hands." Boorman explains he’s protecting the boy who has no connection to "Dust Devil," and informs her boy is an asset’s child. Patty and Ellen don’t believe Boorman and decide they need to speak with the boy. Patty asks Huntley to kidnap the boy; it’s the only way they can get access to him. Boorman realizes the boy doesn’t know what happened to his mother. He meets with his boss and explains that the C.I.A. needs to cut Erickson loose. Boorman’s bomb tech/hacker contact gives him a birth certificate, social security number, and adoption papers for the boy. Dean tells Ellen that Sanchez has been taken to the dangerous Wagyal region, and he can't do anything to save him at this point. Ellen tells Erickson that Boorman has betrayed him. She’ll drop the case if he sends Sanchez back home. Erickson is open to the idea but says he needs assurances that Patty won’t pursue the case after Ellen drops it. Patty tries to convince Ellen not to accept this deal, but Ellen is determined to save Chris regardless of the cost to her career, and finally Patty signs an agreement not to pursue the case. In the end, Erickson kidnaps the boy before Huntley can do it first.
| 49 | 10 | "Failure is Lonely" | Glenn Kessler | Todd A. Kessler & Glenn Kessler & Daniel Zelman | September 14, 2011 |
Anthony Carter stops the Afghan men from killing Chris Sanchez. Ellen tells Erickson to make an offer to her clients, and she will make sure the case is dropped as long as he produces evidence that Sanchez is alive. Patty and Michael meet regarding Catherine. He and his attorney inform Patty that their case is built on proving Patty is an unfit mother with witnesses to back that up. Patty is disdainful, insisting that she will be able to destroy any witness they can come up with to smear her character. Sanchez wakes up, and Carter tells him Ellen made a deal to save his life. They create a proof of life message. As Carter leaves the holding cell, it’s revealed that they are back in the U.S. on the High Star compound. Meanwhile, Boorman decides to go after the boy on his own and forces Ellen to bring him with her when she drives out to the High Star compound with the papers she needs to exchange with Erickson to ensure Chris' release. Erickson sends the boy off with Carter while he meets with Shaw and Ellen. Carter leaves him alone with a sandwich and a soccer ball. Boorman escapes from the trunk of Ellen's car and begins to approach the main building, gunning down any High Star employee who gets in his way. As the boy is playing soccer, the ball accidentally goes down the stairs. When he retrieves it, he finds Sanchez. They recognize each other from the last mission. The boy reveals that he saw what happened to the soldiers who died that day. Patty confesses to Herndon that she isn’t dropping the case. She plans to bring a new case against High Star and calls the judge to file a lawsuit. Carter finds the boy with Sanchez. Carter tells Sanchez that Ellen has arrived on the compound, and if she delivers, he’s free. Sanchez tells Carter the boy was the target, and his men were shot by Boorman when they refused to take the boy captive. Shaw gets a text message informing him of Patty's new lawsuit. The deal is broken, so Erickson orders Chris' death to proceed. Ellen calls Patty to find out why she broke her word, and Patty refuses to drop the case. Horrified, Ellen tries to delay Erickson by informing him that Boorman is on the compound, coming after him. Erickson orders his men to stop the killing of Sanchez and hunt down Boorman instead. Carter ignores this order, instead finding Ellen to tell her that he knows where Sanchez is being held. Carter goes to get a car and sends Ellen to the holding cell to get Chris. Ellen discovers Chris’s medallion next to a hooded man, dead in a pool of blood. The boy comforts Ellen, and as they are leaving, they find Chris alive. He killed Boorman himself after Boorman remorselessly admitted to killing his men when they refused to abduct the child. Erickson finds Boorman dead in the cell. Back in the city, Ellen and Sanchez meet with the CIA director, with Patty recording his answers in preparation for the newest trial. He agrees to cover up the fact that Chris murdered Boorman. Chris gets his dog back, and Ellen reveals her feelings for him. She then meets with Patty but refuses to forgive her for putting Chris in danger by breaking her word and proceeding with the case. She also refuses to take any credit for the case herself, despite Patty's offer. She simply says goodbye and walks away with Patty's scornful words at her back. Erickson and his sons pray together before he’s arrested by the FBI. As Ellen cleans out her office at Hewes and Associates, she sees a TV interview in which Patty takes full credit for the entire High Star case, from beginning to end. Michael drops by Patty’s office to provide a list of witnesses for his case against her. Alone, Patty looks at the list and then looks up with an expression of fear. There is only one name on the list: Ellen Parsons.

== Production ==
For its first three seasons, Damages aired on the FX Network, but the series' ratings continued to decline, with the third season finale, "The Next One's Gonna Go In Your Throat", managing to gain only a 0.2/0 ratings share amongst adults 18-49 and fewer than a million viewers. FX announced on April 4, 2010 that they would not be renewing Damages for a fourth season, though by that time rumors of the series being picked up by DirecTV had already begun to circulate. These rumors continued making the rounds until July 19, 2010 when DirecTV announced that it had officially picked up the series for a fourth and fifth season, each consisting of ten episodes. "We didn't say, 'Let's go rescue shows. We said, 'Let's go find quality programming that's going to resonate with our audience,'" said Derek Chang, an executive Vice President at DirecTV. "FX was very proud to have developed one of the best scripted series on television, but, in order to have a future, the show needed DirecTV and we are thrilled they stepped in," said John Landgraf, President and General Manager at FX.

As with previous seasons, season four is executive produced by creators Todd A. Kessler, Glenn Kessler and Daniel Zelman. Mark A. Baker serves as a co-executive producer, Lori Jo Nemhouser as producer and Mark Fish is a co-producer. Production began in New York City in January 2011.

== Reception ==
=== Awards and nominations ===
The season earned a Critics' Choice Television Awards nomination for Dylan Baker as Best Guest Performer in a Drama Series, a Screen Actors Guild nomination for Glenn Close for Outstanding Performance by a Female Actor in a Drama Series, and a Primetime Emmy Awards nomination for Close for Outstanding Lead Actress in a Drama Series.

=== Critical reviews ===
The fourth season of Damages was met with mostly high praise, and it earned 78 out of 100 based on 12 reviews on the aggregate review website Metacritic. This qualifies as "generally favorable" reviews. On Rotten Tomatoes, the season has an approval rating of 100% with an average score of 8 out of 10 based on 11 reviews. The website's critical consensus reads, "Damages deftly negotiates its transition onto a new platform with a more compact season that further escalates the series' already considerable drama, this time aided by a boisterous John Goodman."
