= Damages season 3 =

Damages
- Season 3
- Region 1 DVD artwork
- No. of episodes: 13

Release
- Original network: FX
- Original release: January 25 – April 19, 2010

Season chronology
- ← Previous; Season 2 Next → Season 4

The third season of the FX legal drama series Damages premiered on January 25, 2010 and concluded on April 19, 2010. It consisted of 13 episodes, bringing the series total to 39. Damages was created by brothers Todd and Glenn Kessler, along with Daniel Zelman, each of whom served as executive producer and contributed four scripts for the season, including the premiere and the finale.

The season picks up one year after the events of season two. Louis Tobin, patriarch of the famously wealthy Tobin family, has just confessed to orchestrating the largest Ponzi scheme in Wall Street history; the U.S. Government has assigned Patty Hewes and Tom Shayes to find the Tobins' hidden money, and uncover any evidence that other Tobin family members (namely Louis' eldest child Joe and long-time attorney Leonard Winstone) had prior knowledge of the fraud. Ellen Parsons has taken a job at the District Attorney's office but, as the story unfolds, she finds herself being pulled further and further back into Patty's orbit. Tom, meanwhile, learns that he unwittingly invested with Louis Tobin and has lost 70% of his net worth and both his parents' and in-laws' savings. He struggles to keep his personal issues from interfering with the case and with keeping this secret from Patty.

Though the season earned mostly positive reviews from television critics, it continued to struggle in the ratings; soon after the season finale, FX announced it had canceled Damages due to low ratings. However, the series was eventually picked up by DirecTV for two additional seasons, which began airing the fourth season on July 13, 2011.

== Cast and characters ==
=== Main cast ===
- Glenn Close as Patty Hewes
- Rose Byrne as Ellen Parsons
- Tate Donovan as Thomas Shayes
- Campbell Scott as Joe Tobin
- Martin Short as Leonard Winstone
- Ted Danson as Arthur Frobisher

=== Recurring cast ===
- Ben Shenkman as Curtis Gates
- Lily Tomlin as Marilyn Tobin
- Ebon Moss-Bachrach as Nick Salenger
- Tom Noonan as Detective Victor Huntley
- Dominic Chianese as Stuart Zedeck
- Vanessa Ray as Tessa Marchetti
- Len Cariou as Louis Tobin
- Ana Reeder as Carol Tobin
- Glenn Fleshler as Detective Milton Trammell
- Mädchen Amick as Danielle Marchetti
- Reiko Aylesworth as Rachel Tobin
- Zachary Booth as Michael Hewes
- Keith Carradine as Julian Decker
- Darren Goldstein as Chris Sharp
- Michael Laurence as Homeless Man
- Jennifer Roszell as Deb Shayes
- Tara Summers as Alex Benjamin
- Craig Bierko as Terry Brooke
- Michael Gaston as Roger Kastle
- Wendy Moniz as Jill Burnham
- Michael Pemberton as Malcolm
- Bill Raymond as Albert Wiggins
- Miriam Shor as Carrie Parsons
- Julie Claire as Gail Sturmer
- Matthew Davis as Josh Reston
- Debra Monk as Deniece Parsons
- Tom Aldredge as Uncle Pete
- Noah Bean as David Connor
- Željko Ivanek as Ray Fiske
- Todd A. Kessler as Perry the Doorman
- Michael Nouri as Phil Grey
- Timothy Olyphant as Wes Krulik

== Episodes ==
No. overall	No. in season	Title	Directed by	Written by	Original release date	US viewers (millions)
27	1	"Your Secrets Are Safe"	Todd A. Kessler	Todd A. Kessler & Glenn Kessler & Daniel Zelman	January 25, 2010	1.43
Patty Hewes has been appointed by the U.S. government to recover billions of dollars lost to the largest investment fraud in Wall Street history. The new case pits Patty against the powerful Tobin family, which includes Joe Tobin (Campbell Scott), Marilyn Tobin (Lily Tomlin), and the family's trusted attorney Leonard Winstone (Martin Short). Meanwhile, Ellen Parsons adjusts to the challenges of her new job and life away from Patty Hewes, by trying to get a drug dealer to give the name of his supplier to the D.A.'s office. Patty promotes Tom Shayes to named partner, and Tom speculates about whether Ellen might want to return to the firm. In the future timeline, Patty's car is rammed off the road by an unknown assailant, and the other car turns out to be registered to Tom Shayes. Detective Huntley tracks the car to a homeless person who carries a bloodstained Chanel handbag that Patty gave to Ellen as a gift six months earlier. In a nearby dumpster the police find the dead body of Tom Shayes.
28	2	"The Dog is Happier Without Her"	Matthew Penn	Aaron Zelman	February 1, 2010	1.02
Patty and Tom investigate the Tobins further, and stumble upon a mysterious woman with the initials D.M.M. In trying to find her, Tom asks Ellen for a personal favor. Meanwhile, Joe Tobin decides to start using his father's secret funds to help his family, and Patty turns to her ex-husband Phil when her beloved dog stops eating. Tom receives devastating news that threatens to tear his family apart when he learns his investments were tied up with Tobin's fraud and that he has lost everything. In the future timeline, Detective Huntley interrogates the homeless man, who informs them that Ellen is the one they should be looking for. Ellen is informed of Tom's murder and immediately goes to Tom's wife to ask if anyone else knew what Ellen and Tom were doing. The initial medical report on Tom's death reveals the wounds on Tom's body were non-lethal; the cause of death was drowning.
29	3	"Flight's at 11:08"	Tony Goldwyn	Mark Fish	February 8, 2010	1.08
Patty and Tom try everything they can, including requesting a favor from the D.A., to prevent Danielle Marchetti from fleeing the country. Joe Tobin and Leonard Winstone consult a doctor after Danielle's accident, who agrees that she can fly if necessary. It is revealed that Joe and Danielle were once involved, and Danielle starts exhibiting symptoms of a subdural hematoma, which the doctor warns Joe would kill her if she were to fly. Tom informs his in-laws, whom he had advised to invest their savings with a firm associated with Tobin, that their money is gone. Ellen tries to support her sister Carrie, when Carrie's husband leaves her and their baby Charlotte, and accidentally discovers drugs in Carrie's luggage. Patty manages to intercept Joe and Danielle, who is unconscious in the back of Joe's car, which is headed to the airport.
30	4	"Don't Throw That at the Chicken"	Matthew Penn	Jeremy Doner	February 15, 2010	0.87
Patty convinces Curtis Gates to postpone Louis Tobin's sentencing for a day so that she can personally interview him about the fraud. Ellen tries to confront Carrie about the drugs, but gets a cold reception and is later pulled back into Patty's life. Joe Tobin, who is an alcoholic, begins drinking again but manages to stop cold turkey. Patty's son, Michael, lies to Patty about having gotten a job and broken up with his girlfriend Jill. Rather than face a life sentence, Louis commits suicide by poisoning his tea, leaving behind an envelope addressed to Patty Hewes, which Joe takes. In the future timeline, Patty is informed of Tom's murder and confesses that the last time she spoke to him he was very upset about something, but he did not tell her what. After Detective Huntley releases her, Patty races home and makes a hysterical phone call, screaming that she told the person on the other end not to go through with it and to stop.
31	5	"It's Not My Birthday"	Daniel Zelman	Adam Stein	February 22, 2010	0.81
As Patty's birthday draws near, she goes head-to-head with Curtis Gates over access to Danielle Marchetti, who is released from hospital. Ellen becomes more involved with the Tobin case and winds up having a romantic interlude with Josh Reston, an investigative journalist she met while working on the UNR case. Marilyn Tobin meets with Patty and confides in her that Danielle and Louis had a child together, and that her daughter, Carol, is not coping well with her father's death. Patty gets Danielle to plead the Fifth at her deposition. Afterward, Carol Tobin pays Danielle a visit; that night Tom finds Danielle dead in her apartment. Carol is shown throwing an empty vial into the river. In the future timeline, Tom is attacked by unknown assailants, and a man is shown putting his body in the dumpster.
32	6	"Don't Forget to Thank Mr. Zedeck"	Timothy Busfield	Aaron Zelman & Mark Fish	March 1, 2010	0.97
Stuart Zedeck and Joe continue to play games with each other over Louis Tobin's hidden money. Under pressure from the judge to make progress with the case, Patty turns to an unlikely source: a man whom she jailed for fraud. His information leads Patty and Tom to an offshore financial scheme in Antigua. Ellen and Curtis question Louis' doctor about his patient's apparent heart attack, and the doctor confesses that he aided in Louis' suicide but had nothing to do with Danielle Marchetti's death. Tom's financial problems weigh heavily on him, and he attacks the broker who reinvested his funds with Tobin. Tom figures out that the Tobins must have been using Danielle Marchetti's daughter to smuggle money out of Antigua. In the future timeline, Ellen meets Tom in the apartment he is hiding out in, and she gives him a sports bag full of money. Ellen asks if Patty knows, but Tom assures her that he will take care of Patty. Detectives Huntley and Trammell search Tom's car and find the money in the trunk.
33	7	"You Haven't Replaced Me"	Glenn Kessler	Todd A. Kessler	March 8, 2010	0.92
Patty sends Tom to Antigua to find the Tobins' hidden money, but he finds he already has enemies on the island. Ellen has Josh Reston write an article about Alex Benjamin that she knows Patty will dislike, knowing Patty will eventually figure out Ellen is behind the scheme. Leonard learns that his mother has died and winds up being blackmailed by his own father, Albert Wiggins, who knows a dark secret about Leonard. Ellen tells Patty that Carol Tobin visited Danielle Marchetti on the night Danielle died, and the two agree to collaborate on the case. Patty joins Tom in Antigua, and they meet with a contact who can help them gain access to the Tobins' bank accounts; the same man who was having Tom followed and who blocked the bank from giving Tom the information Tom requested. In the future timeline, Detective Huntley questions Ellen about her handbag. A partial fingerprint, belonging to a small-time criminal Lester Wiggins, is found on the bag.
34	8	"I Look Like Frankenstein"	Chris Terrio	Daniel Zelman	March 15, 2010	0.97
Carol Tobin has disappeared, and Ellen works closely with Tom in to track her down. Tom takes Ellen to the homeless man, Barry, and he agrees to keep an eye out for Carol, who has been making credit card charges in the area. Arthur Frobisher returns to the fold to promote his new wind power initiative and tries to attach a young actor named Terry Brooke to promote it; the actor proposes producing a movie about Frobisher's life. Patty discovers that Jill and Michael are still together, and that Jill is expecting. Patty offers Jill money to leave Michael, but the offer is refused. Leonard tracks down Carol, who has been hiding out the whole time in an apartment he owns, and he learns that Carol poisoned Danielle Marchetti. It is revealed that it was Leonard who threw away Louis Tobin's phone and boots on Thanksgiving night, as was witnessed by Barry. In the future timeline, Detective Huntley tries to get Ellen's help piecing together the details of Patty's car accident, Tom's murder, and Ellen's stolen handbag. When asked if she and Tom were having a romantic relationship, Ellen confesses they were co-founding a law firm. Tom meets with Leonard at Danielle's apartment, and Leonard gives him the duffel bag full of money.
35	9	"Drive it Through Hardcore"	Tate Donovan	Glenn Kessler	March 22, 2010	0.93
Patty and Tom try to get closer to Carol Tobin, while Ellen has to deal with something more personal when her sister Carrie is arrested on drug charges. Leonard worries about Carol, who seems to be coming unhinged under the stress of having murdered Danielle and of being hidden away. Frobisher has Terry and his movie-producer partner meet Patty, in hopes of dissuading them about their intention to simply portray Patty as a villain in his upcoming biopic. But when Patty deeply insult Frobisher at the meeting, he abandons his inclination to give her a fair portrayal and agrees the film should portray Patty as a villain. Patty and Tom intercept Carol at a fake therapy appointment they had set up, and Carol starts feeding them information. From this, they discover that Tessa Marchetti did spend Thanksgiving with her mother and wonder why she might be lying to them. Ellen asks Patty to help Carrie, and Patty brings Julian Decker (Keith Carradine) back to redecorate her apartment. In the future timeline, Tom resigns from the firm. He later, pale and visibly unwell, then makes a payphone call, after which an unknown person is seen falling off a bridge.
36	10	"Tell Me I'm Not Racist"	David Tuttman	Todd A. Kessler	March 29, 2010	0.65
Patty's clients are unsatisfied with her progress and request her removal from the Tobin case. Judge Reilly gives Patty one week to make significant progress. Ellen's colleague at the D.A.'s office, Nick, learns Ellen has been collaborating with Patty on the case and rats her out to Curtis Gates. Ellen is haunted by dreams of a mysterious woman, and after finding the woman's picture among some old photos, she decides to pay her a visit. Leonard's father arrives in town and continues his streak of blackmail. Tessa Marchetti learns from Tom that her mother's death may be linked to the Tobins and agrees to help Patty in the case, but Gates arrests her before she can be questioned.
37	11	"All That Crap About Your Family"	Matthew Penn	Daniel Zelman	April 5, 2010	0.75
With Tessa Marchetti in Gates' custody, Patty is forced to make a deal with him, turning over evidence that Carol Tobin was involved in Danielle Marchetti's death. After Patty disowns Ellen, Tom comes clean to her about putting the case in jeopardy by approaching Tessa with information about her mother's death. Ellen seeks answers about her childhood and discovers the woman from her dreams was a babysitter she lived with for six months, when her mother was feeling overwhelmed. Ellen was almost adopted by this woman, but Ellen's mother changed her mind at the last minute. Patty and Tom send Tessa Marchetti back to Antigua to retrieve a copy of the forms she signed that allowed her to take the Tobin family's money out of the country. Tessa and her bodyguard are assassinated on the orders of Joe and Marilyn Tobin.
38	12	"You Were His Little Monkey"	Timothy Busfield	Glenn Kessler	April 12, 2010	0.76
For the sake of the case, Tom resigns from the firm after Judge Reilly uncovers his financial troubles. Tom is later seen purchasing the car that rams Patty off the road. Albert Wiggins is arrested, and Len bails him out. Josh Reston receives a tip from an informant on the police force and turns the information over to Ellen, who tells Patty the real Leonard Winstone died in a car accident decades before and Leonard is in fact Lester Wiggins, Albert's son. Ellen leaks the information to Joe Tobin, who confronts Leonard and disowns him. Tom's wife kicks him out and in his desperation, he turns to Leonard, who offers to restore Tom's finances and reputation in return for immunity from prosecution. Meanwhile, Jill accepts Patty's offer to walk out of Michael's life for the price half a million dollars, but instead she uses the money to buy an apartment and a Jaguar for Michael. Patty learns from Terry Brooke that Frobisher may have paid to have David Connor killed, and she and Ellen take the information to the D.A., Curtis Gates. Later, Ellen reveals to Patty that Tom leaked his finances to Judge Reilly to set up his own resignation, to free himself to make a deal with Leonard that would allow them to bring the Tobin family down.
39	13	"The Next One's Gonna Go in Your Throat"	Todd A. Kessler	Todd A. Kessler & Glenn Kessler & Daniel Zelman	April 19, 2010	0.91
Patty, Ellen, and Tom decided to make a deal with Leonard Winstone so they can win the Tobin case. But Patty tries to call the deal off when she gets cold feet and decides to accept losing the case. Tom, however, lies to Ellen and says that Patty let him go through with it. The deal goes awry when one of Zedeck's men finds Tom and stabs him three times when Tom won't give up Winstone's location. Winstone ultimately shows up and is attacked by Zedeck's man. Tom turns on Zedeck's man and bludgeons him to death. Tom then manages to make his way to home, where a drunk Joe Tobin is waiting for him. Joe fell off the wagon when Marilyn told him his father had committed the fraud to protect him when Joe promised unrealistic returns to clients. Joe drowns Tom in a toilet and throws his body in a dumpster. Marilyn, after being disowned by Joe for her lies, commits suicide by jumping off a bridge into the East River. Patty also has to deal with Jill, who didn't leave Michael despite the deal they had made. Patty has Jill arrested for statutory rape using the chromosomal reports Michael had given her. It is revealed it was Michael, infuriated with his mother, who rammed into her with Tom's car. Joe is arrested, and Patty gets him to confess to Tom's murder. Wes returns and tells Ellen about Rick Messer. Ellen says she has moved on, but Wes, feeling she deserves justice, goes after Frobisher and turns him in for David's murder, having to turn himself in during the process. Len, who survived the attack thanks to the homeless man finding and reviving him, is last seen at an airport, planning to flee the country. The episode ends at Patty's lake house, where Ellen asks Patty if everything she has done in her career was worth it, but Patty does not reply. Through Patty's flashbacks, we learn that the reason for Patty's recurring dreams of a horse is she petted one the day she decided to force the miscarriage of her still-born daughter Julia, so that she could go to New York and become an attorney.

== Production ==
After Damages had finished airing its first season in October 2007, FX renewed the series for two additional 13-episode seasons. Production on both seasons was delayed due to the Writer's Guild Strike, which delayed the season two premiere until the beginning of 2009, and season three was consequently delayed until January 2010.

As with the previous two seasons, season three of Damages was executive produced by series creators Todd A. Kessler, Glenn Kessler, and Daniel Zelman. Mark A. Baker and Aaron Zelman served as co-executive producers with Mark Fish serving as co-producer. Aaron Zelman and Mark Fish each wrote one episode and co-wrote the sixth episode. Jeremy Doner and Adam Stein also wrote one episode each. The season's main directors were Matthew Penn (three episodes), Todd A. Kessler (two episodes), and Timothy Busfield (two episodes). Co-creators Daniel Zelman and Glenn Kessler each made his directorial debut with episode five and episode seven, respectively, as did series director of photography David Tuttman with episode ten. The remaining three episodes were directed by Tony Goldwyn, Chris Terrio, and series star Tate Donovan.

== Reception ==
=== Awards and nominations ===
The third season received five nominations for the 62nd Primetime Emmy Awards: Glenn Close for Outstanding Lead Actress in a Drama Series, Rose Byrne for Outstanding Supporting Actress in a Drama Series, Martin Short for Outstanding Supporting Actor in a Drama Series, Ted Danson for Outstanding Guest Actor in a Drama Series, and Lily Tomlin for Outstanding Guest Actress in a Drama Series.

=== Critical reviews ===
The third season of Damages was met with mostly high praise, and it earned 81 out of 100 based on 16 reviews on the aggregate review website Metacritic. This qualifies as "universal acclaim". Rotten Tomatoes gave the third season a 100% rating based on 18 critic reviews, with an average rating of 8.2 out of 10. Rotten Tomatoes' critical consensus reads: "This season of Damages grows even more masterful with dazzling performances all around, first-rate writing and savory storylines."

=== Ratings ===
Despite positive critical reviews, Damages continued to struggle in the ratings. The premiere episode garnered 1.43 million viewers and a 0.3 ratings share with adults 18–49. This is down from the 1.72 million households that viewed the second-season premiere. Season three reached a ratings low point upon airing its tenth episode, "Tell Me I'm Not Racist," which attracted only 650,000 viewers and a 0.2 ratings share with adults 18–49. Though the ratings went into a slight incline for the remainder of the season, the finale was watched by only 910,000 households compared to the 1.05 million viewers who tuned in for the second-season finale.
