= Damages season 5 =

Damages
- Season 5
- Region 1 DVD artwork
- No. of episodes: 10

Release
- Original network: Audience Network
- Original release: July 11 – September 12, 2012

Season chronology
- ← Previous; Season 4

The fifth and final season of the legal drama series Damages premiered July 11, 2012 on the DirecTV owned Audience Network concluding on September 12, 2012. The season has 10 episodes, making a series total of 59 episodes. The fifth season was released on DVD in region 1 on July 16, 2013.

== Cast and characters ==
=== Main cast ===
- Glenn Close as Patty Hewes
- Rose Byrne as Ellen Parsons
- Ryan Phillippe as Channing McClaren

=== Recurring cast ===
- Gillian Alexy as Gitta Novak
- John Hannah as Rutger Simon
- Judd Hirsch as Bill Herndon
- Janet McTeer as Kate Franklin
- Jenna Elfman as Naomi Walling
- Chris Messina as Chris Sanchez
- William Sadler as Helmut Torben
- Bill Camp as Samurai Seven
- Michael Kostroff as Judge Richard Gearheart
- Li Jun Li as Maggie Huang
- Debra Monk as Deniece Parsons
- Alexandra Socha as Rachel Walling
- Zachary Booth as Michael Hewes
- Maya Days as Det. Rosario Ortiz
- Casey Siemaszko as Det. Dan Williams
- Gbenga Akinnagbe as Waleed Cooper
- Victor Garber as Bennett Herreshoff
- David Gautreaux as Bruce Davies
- M. Emmet Walsh as Lyle Hewes
- Noah Bean as David Connor
- Gordon Clapp as Gary Parsons
- Michael Gaston as Roger Kastle
- Adriane Lenox as Angel Auroro

== Episodes ==
No. overall	No. in season	Title	Directed by	Written by	Original release date
50	1	"You Want to End This Once and For All?"	Matthew Penn	Todd A. Kessler & Glenn Kessler & Daniel Zelman	July 11, 2012
In the wake of the High Star case, Ellen launches her own firm and, according to Patty, is looking for a high profile case to help her make a name for herself. Simultaneously, Ellen is testifying against Patty in Michael's custody suit. Meanwhile, Naomi Walling (Jenna Elfman), a trader for the Princefield Investment Bank, approaches Channing McClaren (Ryan Phillippe), the founder of a website where confidential whistle-blowers can post information, intending to disclose illegal activity within her firm. McClaren, anticipating the need for legal protection, seeks Patty’s legal expertise, but she refuses to represent him and instead recommends Ellen. Later, Ellen meets with McClaren and wonders whether to take the job when she learns Patty recommended her. Promised anonymity, Naomi leaks the information against Princefield but somehow her personal emails disclosing her name and affairs with multiple high-ranking Wall Street traders are included in the encrypted leak. As a result, her life begins to fall apart. Naomi's daughter Rachel, a high school senior, seeks Patty’s help in suing McClaren for leaking the information but Naomi refuses to allow legal action. That same night, Naomi is murdered by two unknown men who stage the murder to look like she committed suicide by slashing her wrists in the bathtub. Naomi’s death is ruled a suicide and Patty files a wrongful death suit against Channing McClaren. Ellen's testimony in Michael's custody case is challenged by Patty, which presents Ellen with a hard choice: testify against Patty in the custody case or accept McClaren's offer and try a case against Patty. Ellen decides to take McClaren's case and convinces Michael to put the custody hearing on hold. Mentor and protégée prepare to face each other in court. Three months later, Patty is arrested and questioned by the detectives who worked David Connor's murder. Ellen is shown unconscious in an alley.
51	2	"Have You Met the Eel Yet?"	Colin Bucksey	Hans Tobeason	July 18, 2012
Publicly stating that he did not intend to expose Naomi's private life, Channing McClaren is involved in a media frenzy. Patty and Ellen face each other in court, where Ellen suspects that the judge is favoring Patty. An enigmatic woman named Kate Franklin approaches Ellen and offers to be her new associate. However, Ellen discovers that Kate had worked for Patty twenty years ago, and as a loyalty test sends her to Patty, making demands she double the offer Ellen made. Patty falls into the trap and tries to hire Franklin. Having overheard a conversation at Patty's, Kate confirms Ellen's doubts about the judge, leading Ellen to hire Kate and blackmail the judge. At the same time, a private investigator working for Ellen finds evidence Naomi had met Channing, contradictory to Channing's statement. After the judge recuses himself from the case and a new one steps in, Ellen finds out that Patty had orchestrated everything: the judge was ruling in favor of Ellen, so Patty manipulated Ellen to believe the opposite, making room for a new, more favorable judge. In the future timeline, Ellen is shown meeting someone before her alleged fall. Meanwhile, the police allow Patty to make a phone call and she calls the missing Ellen, whose phone is lying beside her in the alley as an obscure figure looks down at her from the rooftop.
52	3	"Failure is Failure"	Jean de Segonzac	Arthur Phillips	July 25, 2012
Ellen confronts Channing about the video in the hotel corridor where he allegedly meets Naomi. He confesses that he has met with Naomi twice. Once in Rome and the second time in the hotel room briefly before her suicide. He claims that they only discussed the arrangements of their agreement without anything happening between them. As a result Ellen deposes Rachel Walling who gives her a different story. Namely her mother had met Channing twice, but they had sex the first time while the second he tried to rape her. As a proof she has Channing's damaged cigarette box which he had thrown in the wall while threatening her mother. After days of seeming defeat, Ellen questions Rachel about the last phone call she had with her mother. Rachel says that her mother called and they talked briefly about their mutual love and they said their goodbyes. However, Ellen, through the phone records proving that the last phone call lasted only two seconds, proves that Rachel may be lying about everything she claims she knows about her mother. After successfully deposing Rachel, Ellen celebrates with Chris only to be interrupted by her grieving mother. At the end the new associate of Ellen's, Kate Franklin, appears at Patty's apartment telling Patty that "he" is dying and that Patty should finally contact him. Leaving the identity of the man or Kate's relationship with Patty unknown.
53	4	"I Love You, Mommy"	Marcos Siega	Jason Wilborn	August 1, 2012
Patty arrives in her office to find her granddaughter Catherine sitting at her desk. When Catherine refuses to move Patty lashes out at her, only to see Catherine replaced by Ellen. It's the same dream Patty had earlier. But this time Ellen says, "I love you, Mommy." Waking from her dream, Patty finds herself on the couch in her apartment. Patty meets an old friend Roger Kastle (Michael Gaston), who tells her she's on the short list for the Supreme Court. When the SEC blocks Patty's access to Princefield's computer servers, Patty goes to the media saying that McClaren sexually assaulted Naomi Walling. Incensed, Ellen schedules a hearing with Judge Gearheart who in turn issues a gag order on both women. When Ellen complains that Patty manipulated the situation, Judge Gearheart takes offense and tells her the order stands. Ellen learns her mother, Denise, left her abusive husband Gary. Patty hires a new associate Jake Stahl who has a specialty in cyber law. A hacker known as Samurai Seven contacts Patty and Ellen, offering to sell them information about Princefield. During a late-night drop, Patty gets the Princefield information. Ellen arrives later, after Patty's gone. Just as the hacker's about to give her the information, he's murdered. As Patty reads through the hacker's trove of data on Princefield she falls asleep and again dreams of Ellen. This time their exchange is more chilling and Patty flashes back to Ellen struggling for her life with the assassin.
54	5	"There's Something Wrong With Me"	Tate Donovan	Hans Tobeason	August 8, 2012
Ellen dreams of her attack only to wake up in her office. Patty arrives in Ellen's office for a meeting. After Patty fishes for a minute, Ellen bluffs that she bought the Princefield information from the hacker and Patty doesn't let on that she actually does have it. While Ellen works to track down the hacker, Patty learns that Princefield's CEO has been cooperating with the SEC's investigation. The SEC official acknowledges he has recordings of Naomi Walling's communications. Patty threatens him to find any records of Naomi's communications with McClaren or Patty will issue a press release indication the SEC knew about the insider trading but failed to act on it. Ellen schedules a meeting with Judge Gearheart, where Beth Kim provides evidence that Patty bought the information. Patty hands over the information. Ellen has another nightmare only to bolt awake in her office. Patty visits her dying father in the nursing home. The old man offers to put Patty in his will. She declines and tells him never to contact her again.
55	6	"I Need to Win"	Daniel Zelman	Josh Payne	August 15, 2012
Ellen continues to have disturbing dreams about her late fiancé. Later, she thinks that she sees the hitman who tried to kill her years ago. Her trauma counselor advises her to drop the case. In separate interviews with Patty and Ellen, Thomas Weld, who had stayed in the room next to Naomi Walling's, says he did not hear an argument from Naomi's room, which does not help Patty's case. Ellen pushes further by promises not to expose Weld, discovering he was carrying on an affair at the hotel. Naomi's daughter Rachel is confronted by Naomi's former boss, which causes her to consider dropping the case. Later she's approached directly by McClaren who convinces her to listen to his side of the story. In his retelling, McClaren is less aggressive. Instead, McClaren is awkward and his extremely poor social skills create a misunderstanding. Despite his actions quite clearly constituting a sexual assault, he was trying to be seductive and persistent, not aggressive. He accepts full responsibility and Rachel tells Patty to accept the settlement. Until this point, McClaren left Ellen unaware that he'd made a settlement offer, so Ellen is taken by surprise. Meanwhile, Kate lets Ellen know she still has some prior business with Patty. During Richard Weld's deposition, Patty confronts him with new evidence, at which Weld admits he heard McClaren berating and threatening Naomi. His vivid description is compelling. When Rachel sees the tape, she immediately rejects the settlement offer. It is revealed Weld's testimony was the result of blackmail by Ellen with Patty's support: both want to sabotage the settlement to bring the case to court. Ellen blackmailed the witness to make him provide the damning testimony; Patty agreed that the testimony will never be used in court. Two months in the future, the courtroom is being called to order on the trial's first day.
56	7	"The Storm's Moving In"	Tate Donovan	Todd A. Kessler & Glenn Kessler & Daniel Zelman	August 22, 2012
Channing learns about the death of Samurai Seven, the computer hacker. Meanwhile, Patty and Ellen travel to Maine University to depose Dr. Lee Collins, a computer science expert who analyzed Princefield's servers. Chris Sanchez, who now counsels military veterans, learns that the military routinely prescribes antidepressants to servicemen suffering from PTSD via web chat sessions and sends them back to combat without meeting a doctor in person. Chris wants Ellen to give this story to Channing. Channing meets with Beth Kim, Samurai Seven's girlfriend, where she tells him that Ellen, Gitta, and Patty met Samurai Seven behind Channing's back. Rutger Simon meets with a major funder of McClarenTruth and describes the information that Samurai Seven leaked and how both sides of the cases now have access to it. He explains that Princefield was conducting its own investigation into Naomi Walling long before she began speaking to McClaren, and that Princefield's CEO Bennett Herreshoff turned over the results of the investigation to the SEC. In Maine, Dr. Collins tells Patty and Ellen that Naomi's personal information was hacked from her laptop by someone with extensive expertise, possibly McClaren or Samurai Seven. A snowstorm arrives, prompting Patty to invite Ellen to board her private plane, an invitation that Ellen accepts. McClaren meets Naomi Walling's old boss, Bruce Davies, to see what he knows, explaining that Princefied's CEO Bennett Herreshoff was investigating both Davies and Naomi. In response, Davies explains that Herreshoff helped create Fund 23 with the express purpose of insider trading. Nothing leads back to the insulated Herreshoff, who had no motive to kill Samurai Seven. Davies writes down the name of the man who gave him the stock tips that led to the insider trading. Later, McClaren returns to tell Rutger the name of the man Bruce Davies gave: Helmut Torben, the donor Rutger had just met with. At the airport, Patty comments that, despite their differences, she and Ellen have a lot in common. Ellen claims the only reason they're still in each other's lives is Patty manufactured the McClaren case to prevent Ellen from testifying. On the subject, Patty asks Ellen what is the worst thing she knows about Patty. Enraged, Ellen calls Patty "crazy", reminding her that she admitted to trying to have Ellen killed. Patty denies it, claiming that because Ellen had Patty at gunpoint during the admission, Patty only said what she thought Ellen needed to hear in order to let her go. Ellen is so unnerved by this conversation that she decides to wait for another flight.
57	8	"I'm Afraid of What I'll Find"	Ken Girotti	Hans Tobeason	August 29, 2012
Ellen continues private counseling while Patty continues to be courted for the Supreme Court. However, Patty is warned she must first deal with any existing improprieties, which reminds her of the attempted murder of Ellen. Gitta and McClaren go to Ellen with the information that Torben both assisted in Fund 23's insider trading and funds McClarenTruth. Michael discovers that his maternal grandfather, Lyle Hewes, is still alive and wishes the family land to go to Michael after his death. Lyle fails to convince Michael to drop the custody case. Later, Michael fails to convince Patty to release her portion and allow him to inherit the family land. After Ellen visits Uncle Pete's widow in her search for the man who was hired to kill her, the widow contacts the assassin, named Patrick, to warn him. Ellen gives a part of the blood stained business card (from season 1) to the detectives who worked the case of David's murder, asking them to test it for the DNA of her assassin. The press surrounding the case suddenly becomes positive when Chris Sanchez and McClarenTruth release the anonymous information on the soldiers with PTSD. Patty reveals to Ellen that she knows the identity of Torben and she demands the complete finances of McClarenTruth. Ellen finally learns the identity of her assassin—Patrick Scully, a petty criminal. Patty accepts the nomination for the Supreme Court. Two weeks later, Patrick Scully is depicted on a roof looking down on Ellen's unconscious body. Scully also meets with Patty.
58	9	"I Like Your Chair"	Steve Shill	Todd A. Kessler & Glenn Kessler & Daniel Zelman	September 5, 2012
Rutger pleads ignorance to Channing about his knowledge of funding from Torben. Ellen assigns her PI to locate Patrick Scully. Patrick conducts his own espionage of Ellen's offices. He later breaks in with the intention of killing Ellen but is forced to leave due to complications. Patrick is eventually located by tricking him into confronting Ellen on the office rooftop. He is then blackmailed and forced at gunpoint into testifying against Patty in Michael's custody case, being forced to admit that Patty did try to kill Ellen five years ago. Patty conducts her depositions of Channing's team, but instead uses this time as a chance to confront Rutger about Torben and Rutger's involvement with Fund 23. Rutger once more pleads ignorance, though Channing becomes enraged at this and later fires Rutger. Torben and Herreshoff privately express a willingness to eliminate Rutger if need be. Ellen later meets with Torben and proposes an arrangement to protect their interests in order to win the case. Rutger offers his services to Patty in an attempt to destroy Channing and secure funding for his own future ventures. Ellen's father, blaming her for problems in his marriage, confronts Ellen but is warded away when Ellen pulls a gun on him. Flashbacks show Naomi engaging in an affair with Channing back in Rome, with Rutger furious about this. Rutger later colluded with Herreshoff to protect him from the worst parts of the Fund 23 fallout. In exchange, he demands money and promises to reveal Naomi's private information in order to discredit Channing. Ellen meets with Patty in her office. After attempting to mentally rattle Ellen, Patty states, "Oh, I just had a premonition. This is the last time you'll ever set foot in this office."
59	10	"But You Don't Do That Anymore"	Glenn Kessler	Todd A. Kessler & Glenn Kessler & Daniel Zelman	September 12, 2012
Patty and Ellen begin preparing for the trial. Ellen and Chris have a falling out after she willingly exposes the soldier who leaked classified data. Ellen then experiences a dream of David's ghost warning Ellen she is turning into Patty. Patty informs Ellen that Rutger will be her key witness, causing Ellen to later meet with Torben and pass on this information. Herreshoff and Torben meet with Rutger and seemingly convince him to step back entirely from the case of his volition. Flashbacks reveal that Naomi confronted Rutger regarding the leak of her personal information. She threatens to reveal that Herreshoff was actually behind Fund 23, making Rutger encourage the plan to fake Naomi's suicide in order to protect himself. On the day of the trial, Patty's case falls apart when Rutger fails to appear, causing her to declare to the judge that her case is now finished and having the case dismissed. Ellen and Channing celebrate this victory, although questions are raised about Rutger's disappearance. Now being forced to cooperate, Patrick records Patty admitting that she personally organsised the attack on Ellen. Patty agrees to meet with Lyle one last time. Although she is encouraged to forgive him, Patty instead ridicules Lyle, telling him that his abuse has fuelled her for decades, and she has no desire to ever let go of her anger. Patty offers Michael shared custody of Catherine, but Michael smugly refuses, confident that he will win sole custody. A doctor explains to her that Ellen is pregnant and that extreme rest is required in order to complete her pregnancy. Ellen refuses this advice. This culminates in her collapsing in a pool of blood on the street outside her office on the day of the custody case due to exhaustion (creating the impression that Ellen was pushed off the rooftop). Alarmed by her disappearance, and assuming Patty's role, Ellen's police friends take Patty into custody. Ellen is discovered on the street and rushed to hospital. Assuming Ellen will die, Patrick prepares to flee, but an enraged Michael attempts to blackmail him into helping the custody case. Patrick murders Michael to cover his tracks and disappears. Ellen and Patty meet one final time. Ellen gives over her evidence regarding Patrick and declares that Michael's death has ended the conflict. Patty reveals that she intentionally won Rutger over to her side in order to force Ellen to do something drastic to win the McClaren case. Flashbacks reveal that after Ellen revealed Rutger's betrayal to Torben, she personally pushed for him to be eliminated, resulting in his murder shortly before the trial. Patty expresses delight in this chain of events, confessing that her goal was to mould Ellen into someone as ruthless as she is. Ellen feels only horror and disgust. Years later Ellen walks the streets with her young daughter and briefly encounters an older Patty. Ellen makes eye contact with Patty and leaves without a word. Ellen's daughter asks who Patty was, and Ellen explains she knew her from her days in law, but that Ellen has left that life behind. Seated in her limo, Patty imagines a grateful Ellen thanking her for the years of support. Back in reality, Patty gets one last look at Ellen and coldly orders her driver to change their destination from home to the office.

== Production ==
For its first three seasons, Damages aired on the FX Network, but the series' ratings continued to decline, and on April 4, 2010, FX announced that they would not be renewing Damages for a fourth season, though by that time rumors of the series being picked up by DirecTV had already begun to circulate. On July 19, 2010, DirecTV announced that it had officially picked up the series for a fourth and fifth season, each consisting of ten episodes. It was confirmed in February 2012 that the fifth season would be final season of the series.

As a tie-in to the season, DirecTV launched McClarenTruth.org, the website owned and operated by Ryan Phillippe's character. There, viewers are able to browse through several breaking stories and contact the editor on 1-855-GOTRUTH.

As with previous seasons, season five is executive produced by creators Todd A. Kessler, Glenn Kessler and Daniel Zelman. Mark A. Baker serves as a co-executive producer with Jason Wilborn and Greer Yeaton as co-producers, Lori Jo Nemhouser as producer and David Manson and Hans Tobeason as consulting producers.

== Reception ==
=== Awards and nominations ===
For its fifth and final season, Glenn Close received her third Golden Globe nomination for Best Actress – Television Series Drama, after being absent the previous two years.

=== Critical reviews ===
The fifth-season premiere received positive reviews from television critics, and earned a 79 out of 100 based on 8 reviews on the aggregate review website Metacritic. On Rotten Tomatoes, the season has an approval rating of 85% with an average score of 7.4 out of 10 based on 13 reviews. The website's critical consensus reads, "Damages concludes with nary a crack across its artistic integrity; the fifth and final season bringing the contentious mentorship between Patty Hewes and Ellen Parsons to a satisfying finish."
