= Actor Award for Outstanding Performance by a Female Actor in a Drama Series =

American award for acting in television

Actor Award for Best Actress in a Drama Series
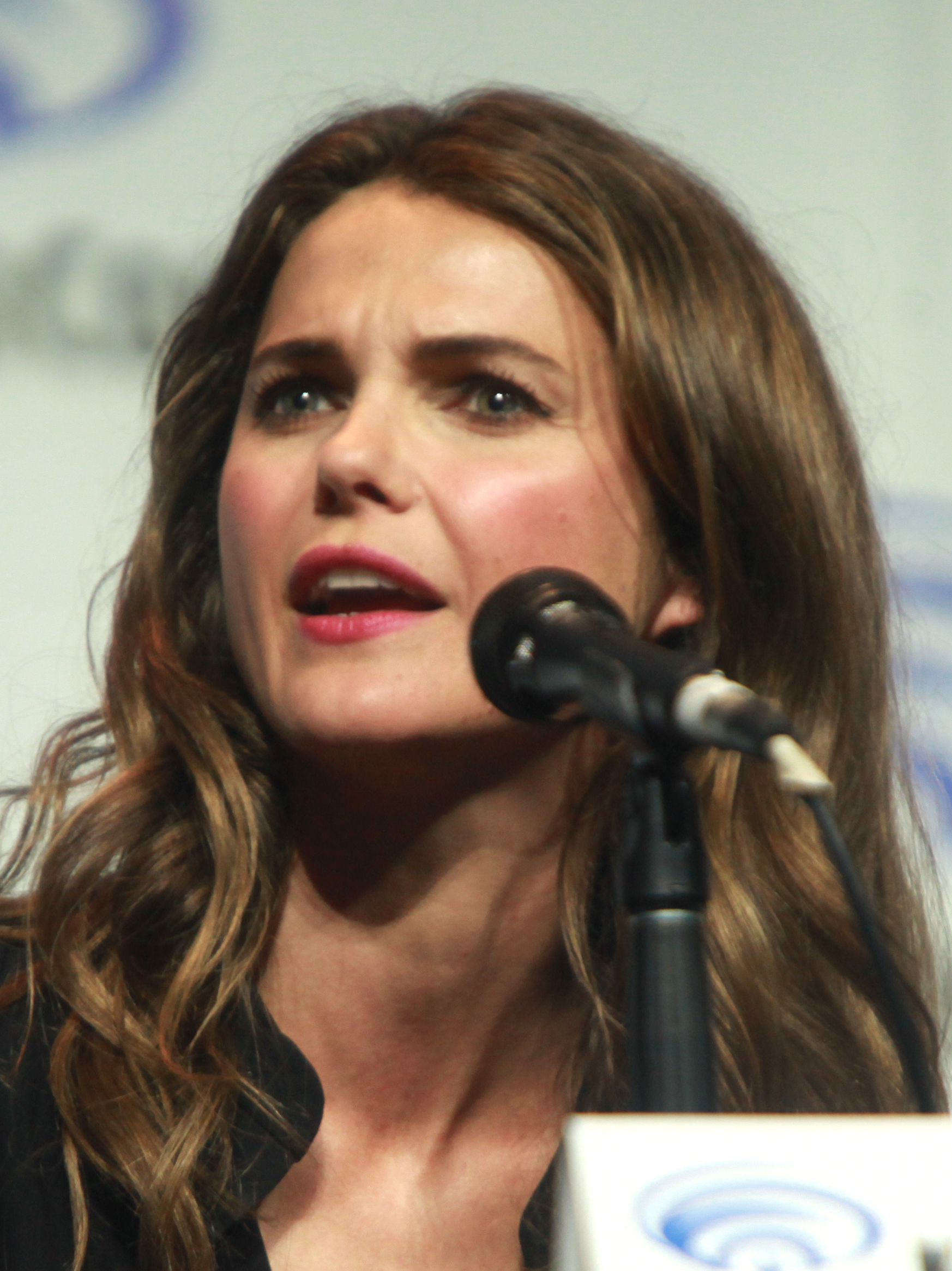
- The 2025 recipient: Keri Russell
- Awarded for: Outstanding Performance by a Female Actor in a Drama Series
- Location: Los Angeles, California
- Presented by: SAG-AFTRA
- Currently held by: Keri Russell for The Diplomat (2025)
- Website: sagawards.org

The Actor Award for Outstanding Performance by a Female Actor in a Drama Series is an award given by the Screen Actors Guild to honor the finest acting achievements in Dramatic Television.

Julianna Margulies holds the record for most nominations in this category with nine as well as the most wins with four, two for ER and two for The Good Wife. Gillian Anderson and Edie Falco each have three wins followed by Viola Davis, Claire Foy, Allison Janney, and Sandra Oh with two wins.

== Winners and nominees ==
indicates the winner.

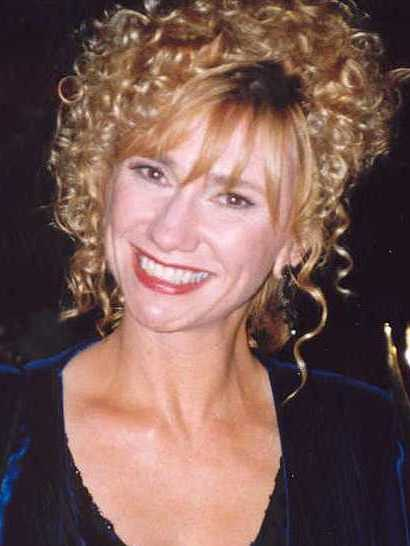
Kathy Baker won for Picket Fences in 1994.

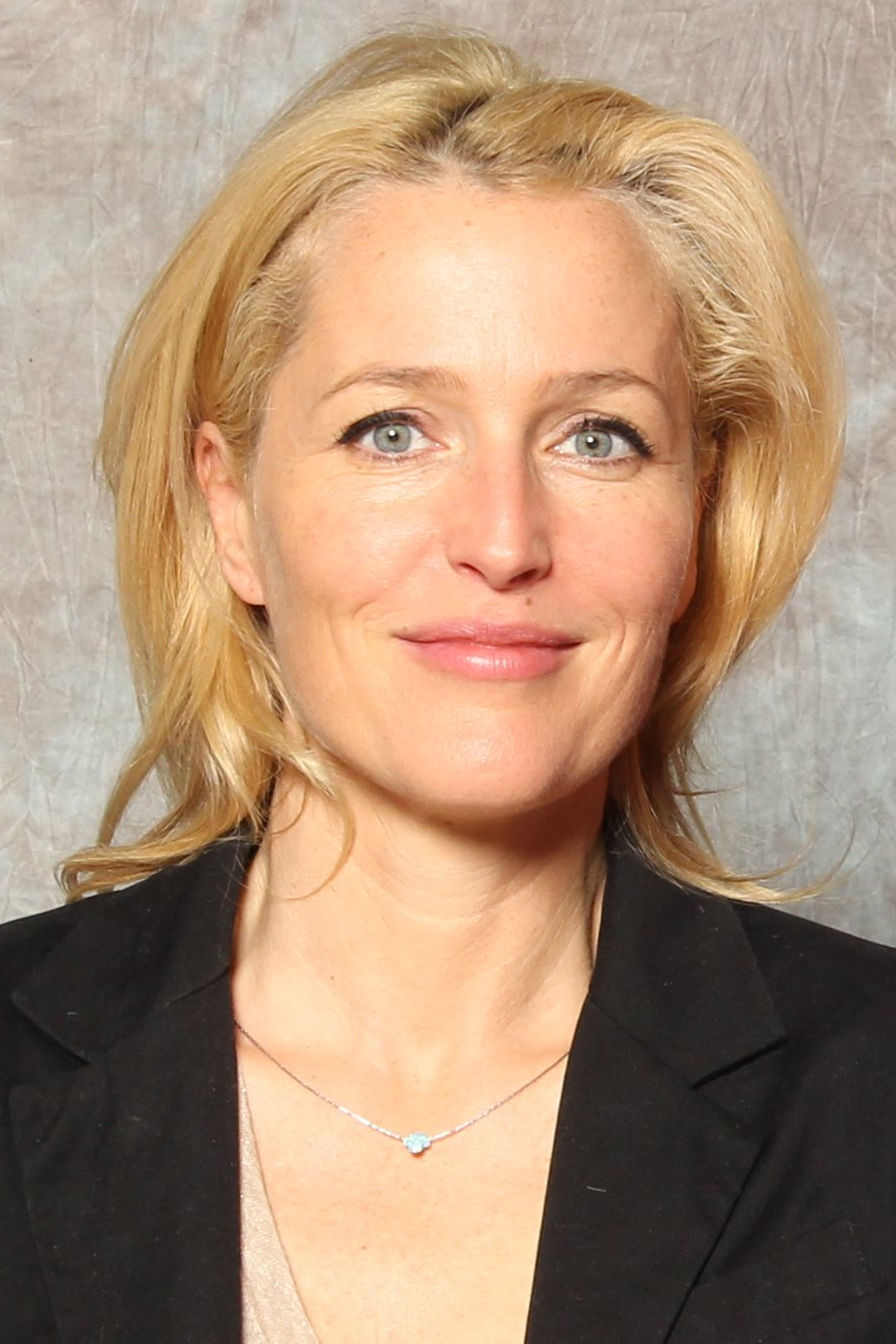
Gillian Anderson won three times, twice for The X-Files (1995, 1996) and once for The Crown (2020)

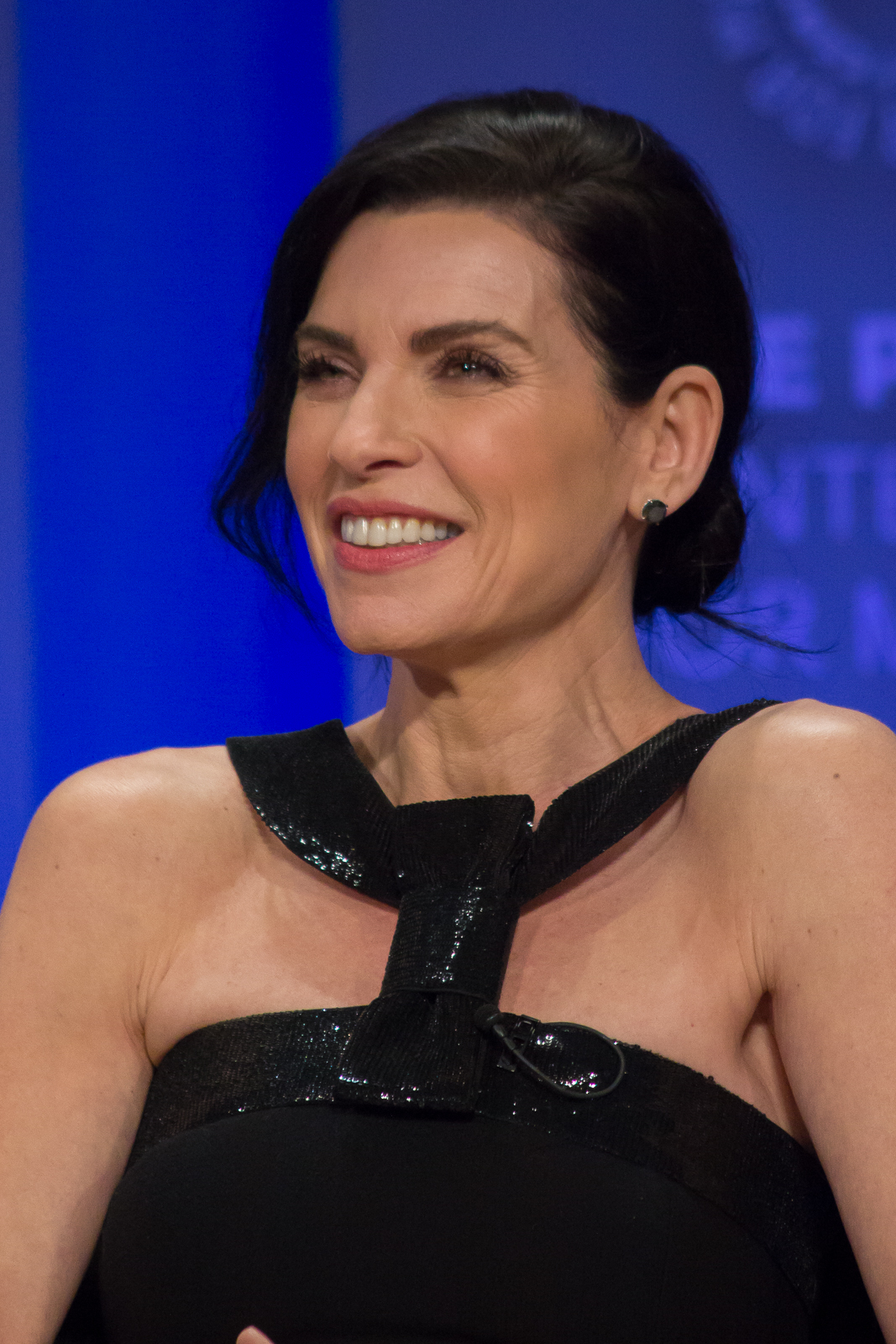
Julianna Margulies won four times, twice for ER (1997, 1998), and twice for The Good Wife (2009, 2010)

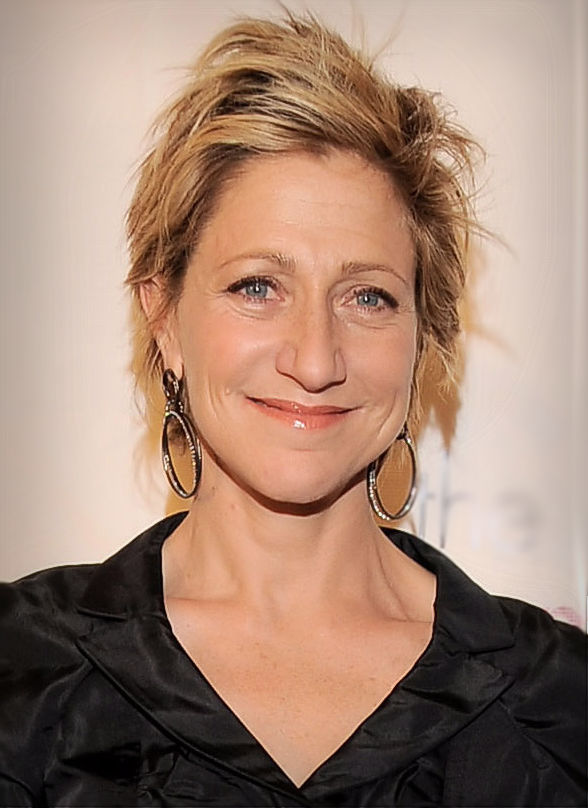
Edie Falco won three times for The Sopranos (1999, 2002, and 2007)

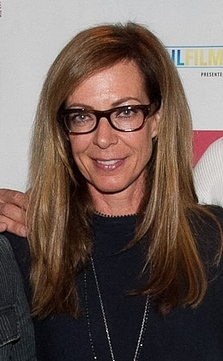
Allison Janney won twice for The West Wing (2000, 2001)

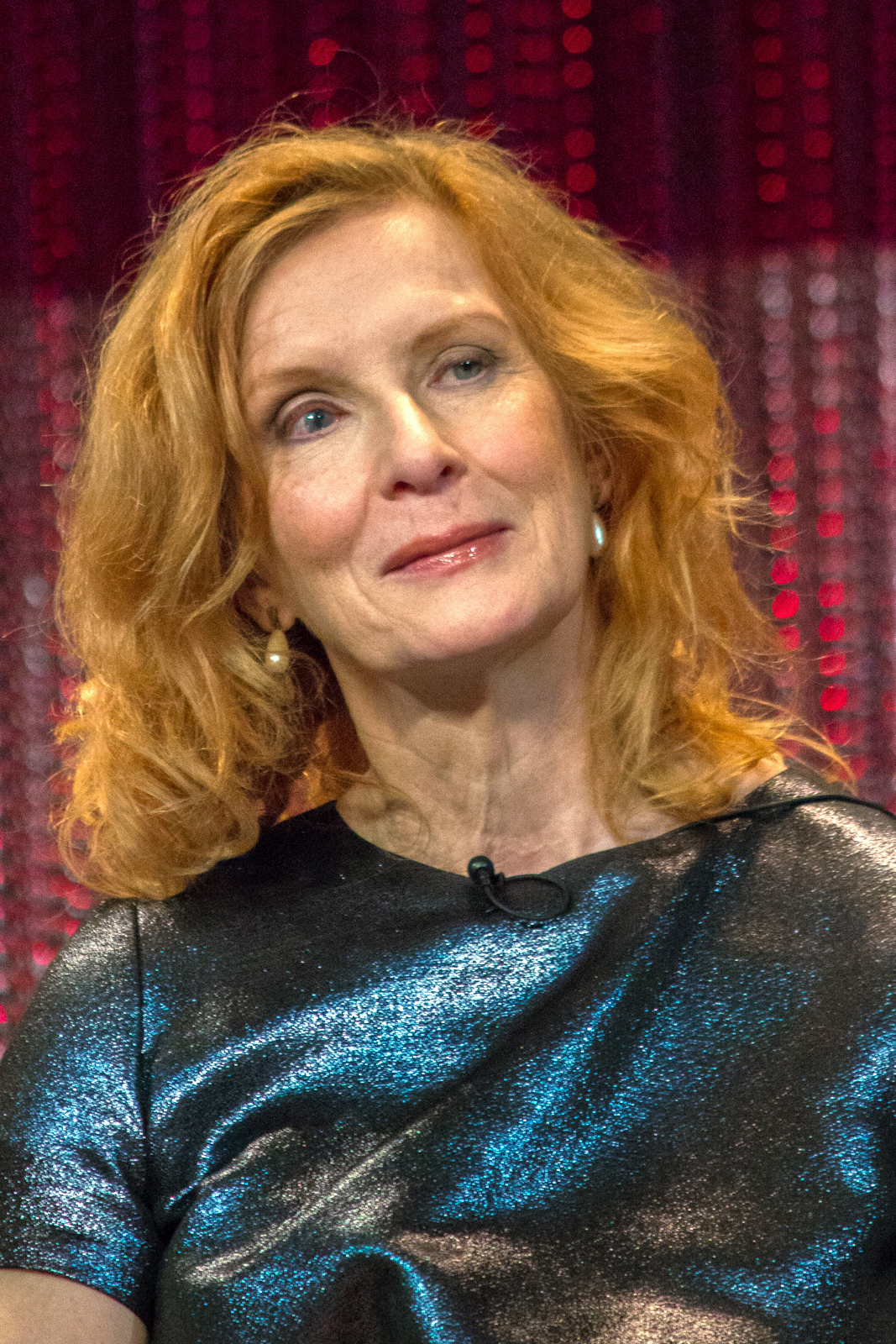
Frances Conroy won for Six Feet Under (2003)

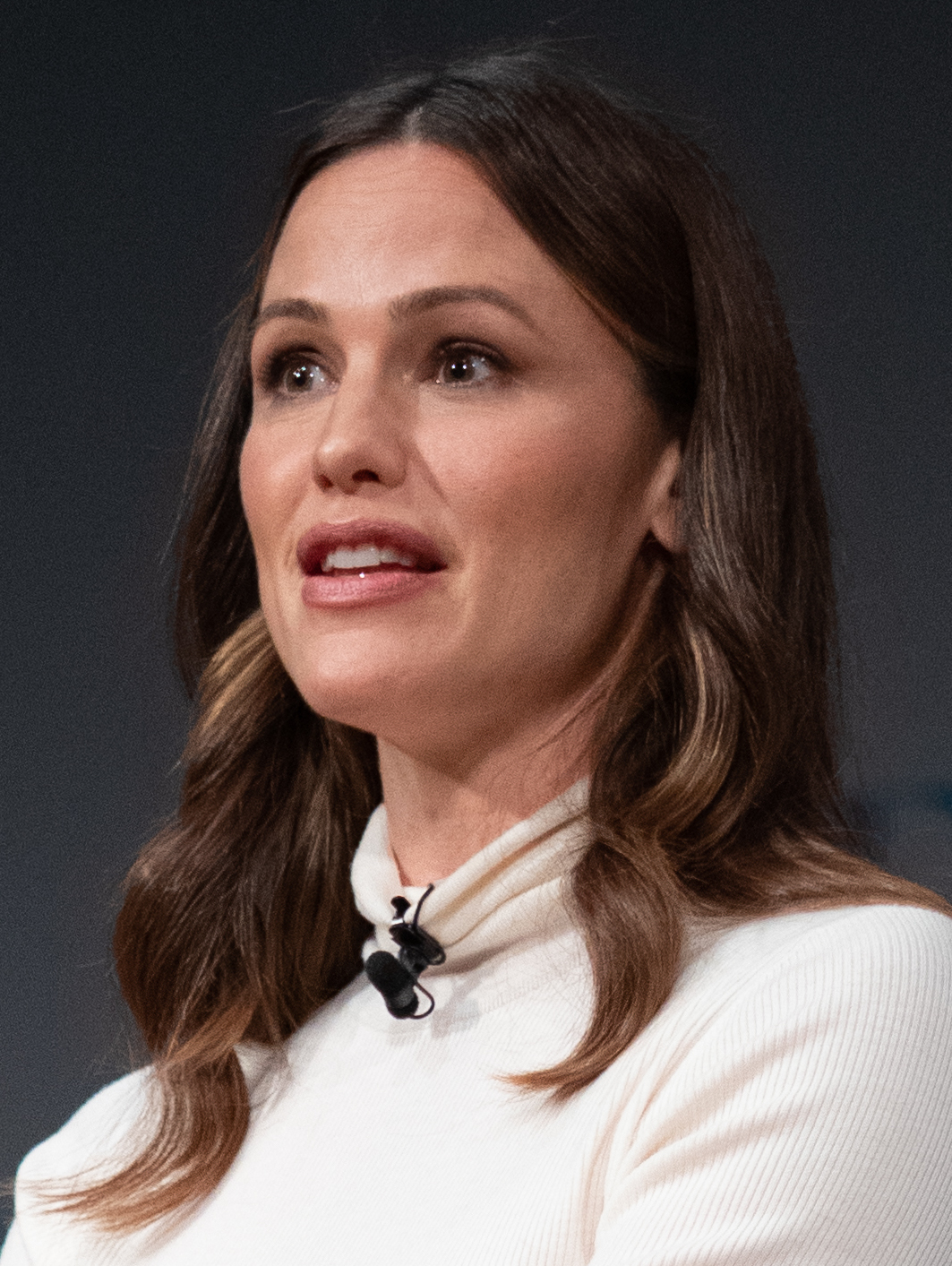
Jennifer Garner won for Alias (2004).

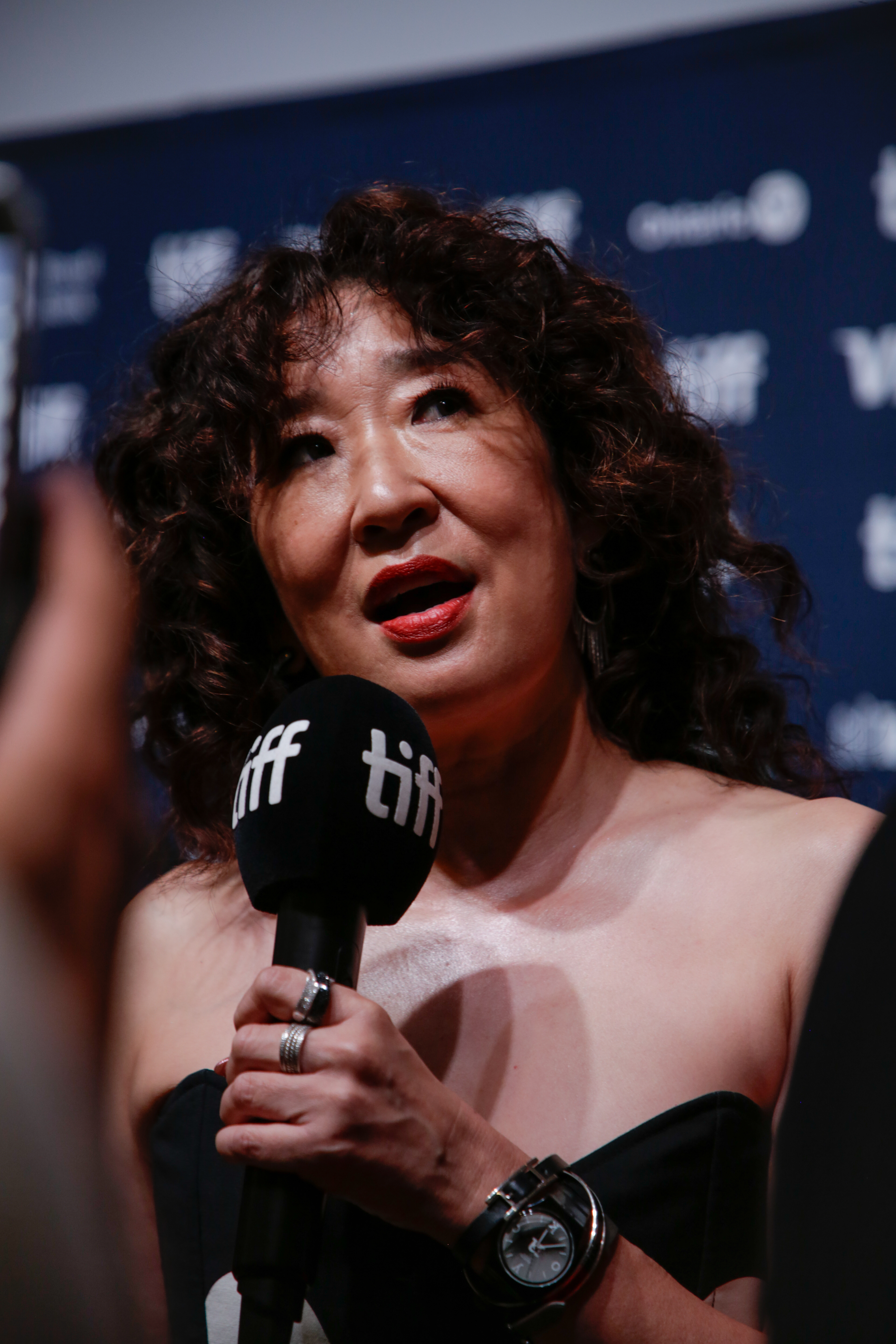
Sandra Oh won twice for Grey's Anatomy (2005) and Killing Eve (2018)

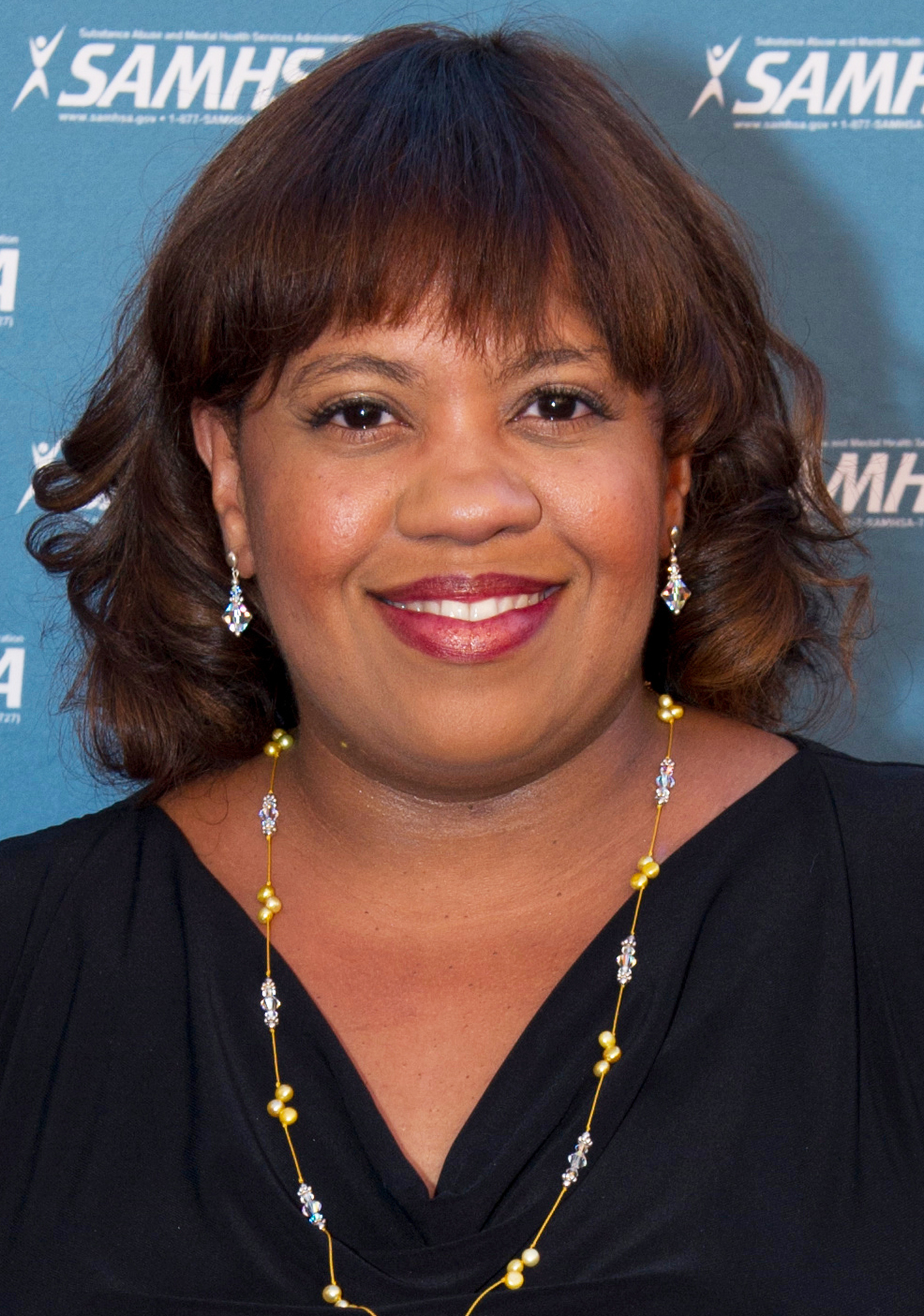
Chandra Wilson won for Grey's Anatomy (2006).

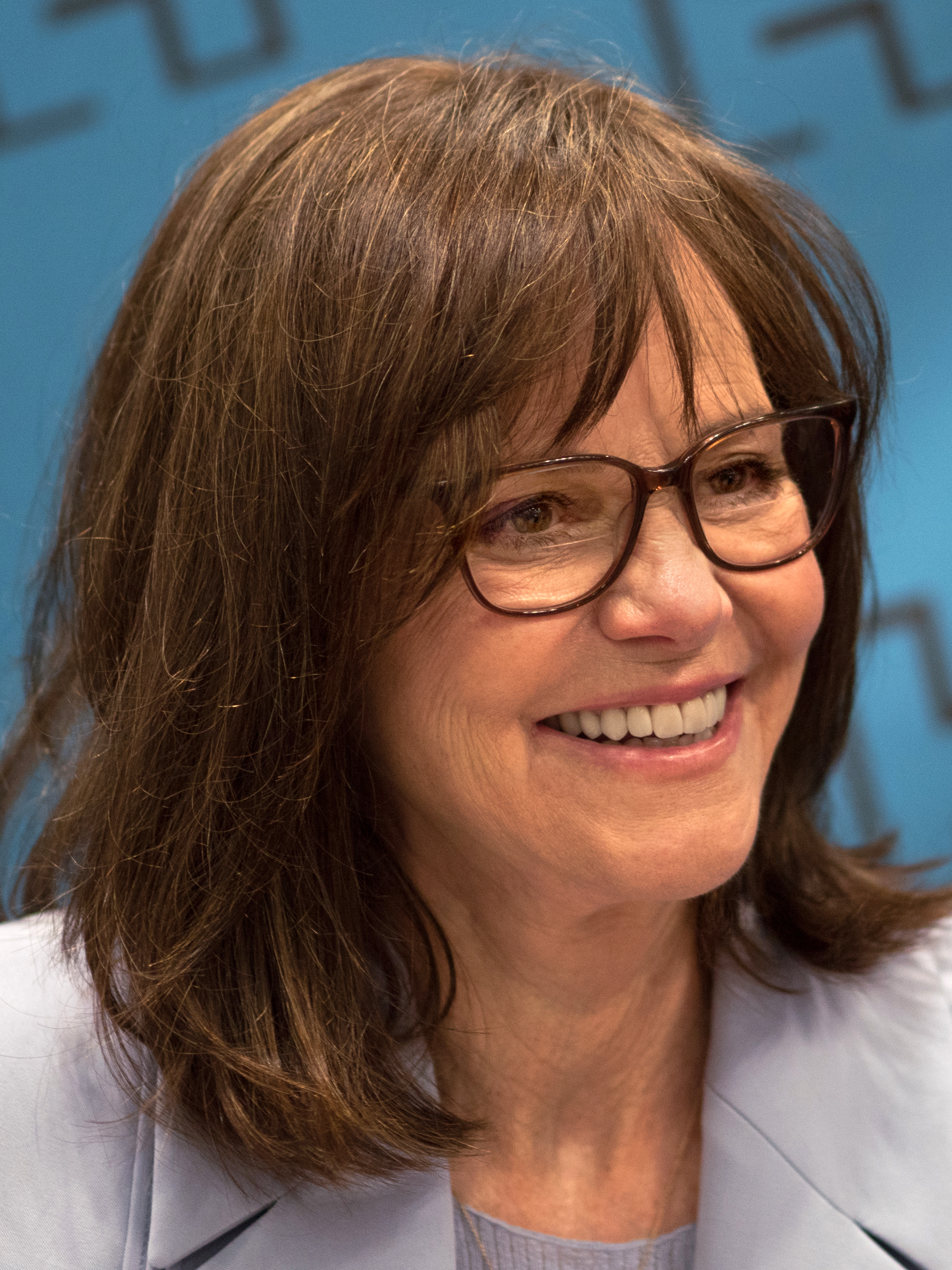
Sally Field won for Brothers & Sisters (2008).

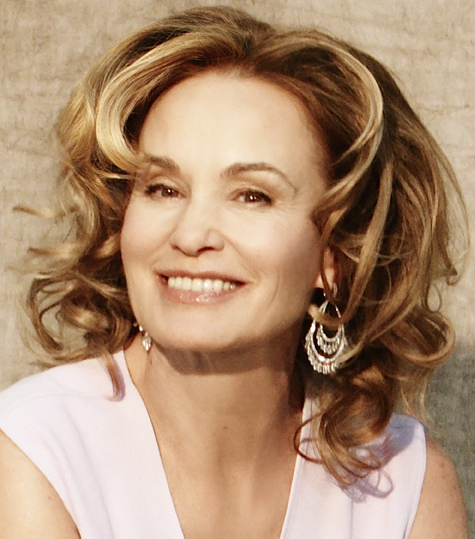
Jessica Lange won for American Horror Story (2010).

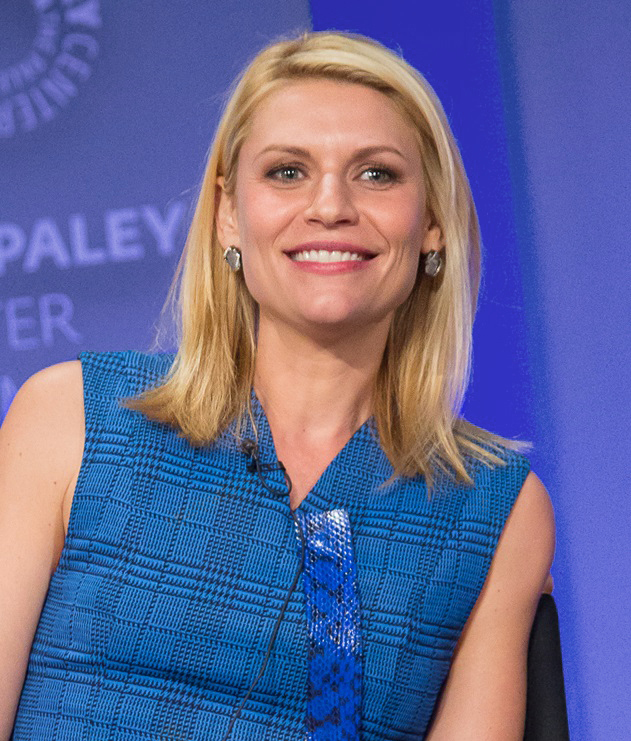
Claire Danes won for Homeland (2012).

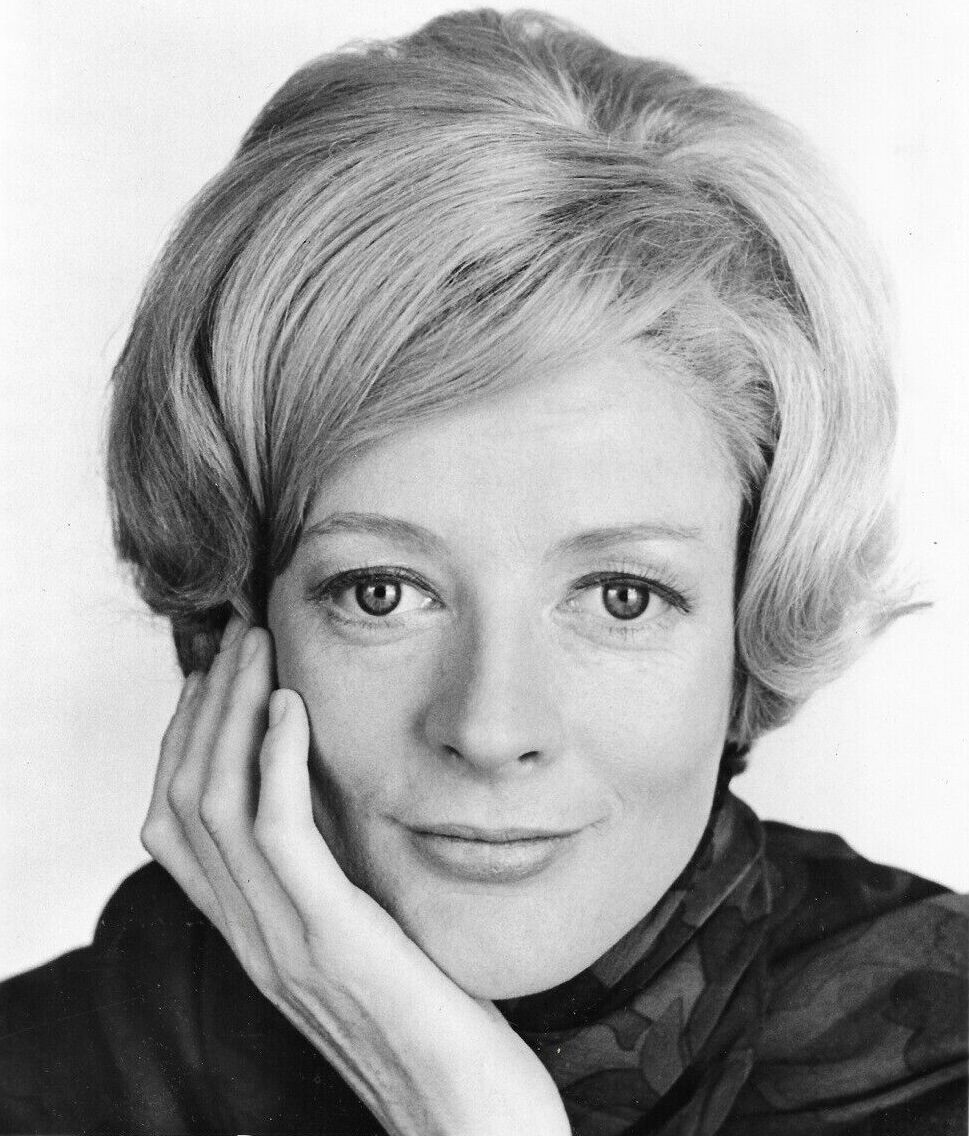
Maggie Smith won for Downton Abbey (2013).

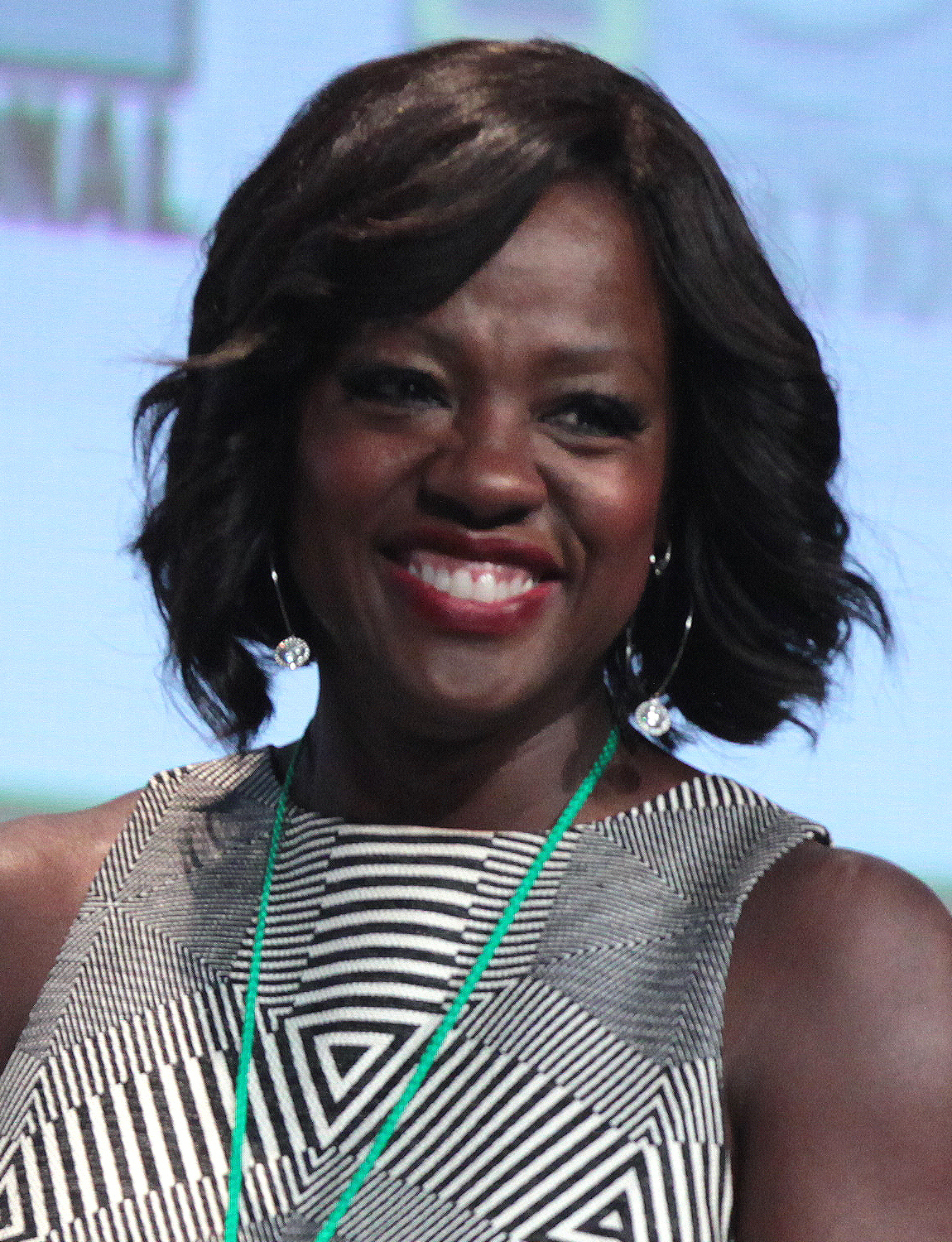
Viola Davis won twice for How to Get Away with Murder (2014, 2015)

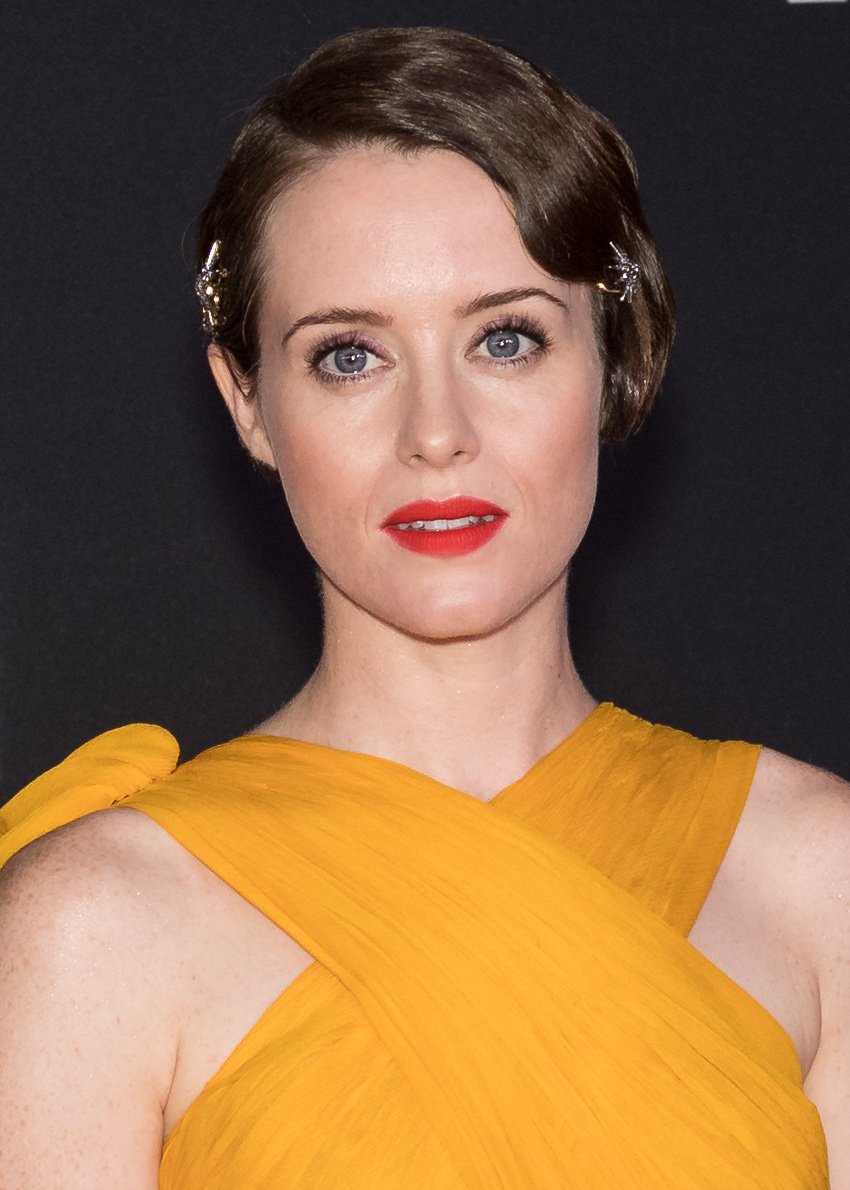
Claire Foy won twice for The Crown (2016, 2017)

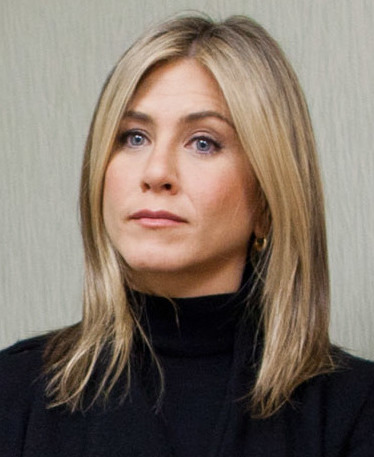
Jennifer Aniston won for The Morning Show (2019)

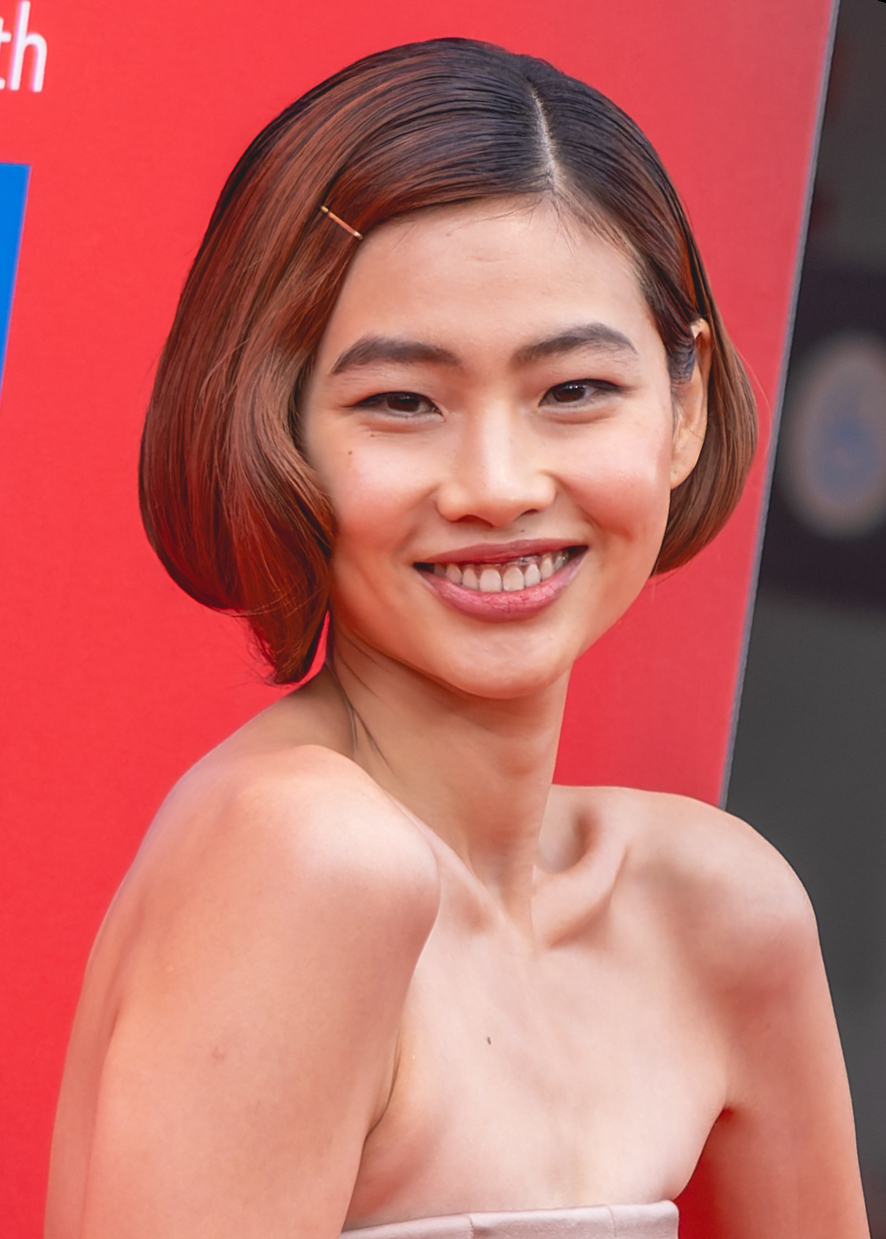
HoYeon Jung won for Squid Game (2021).

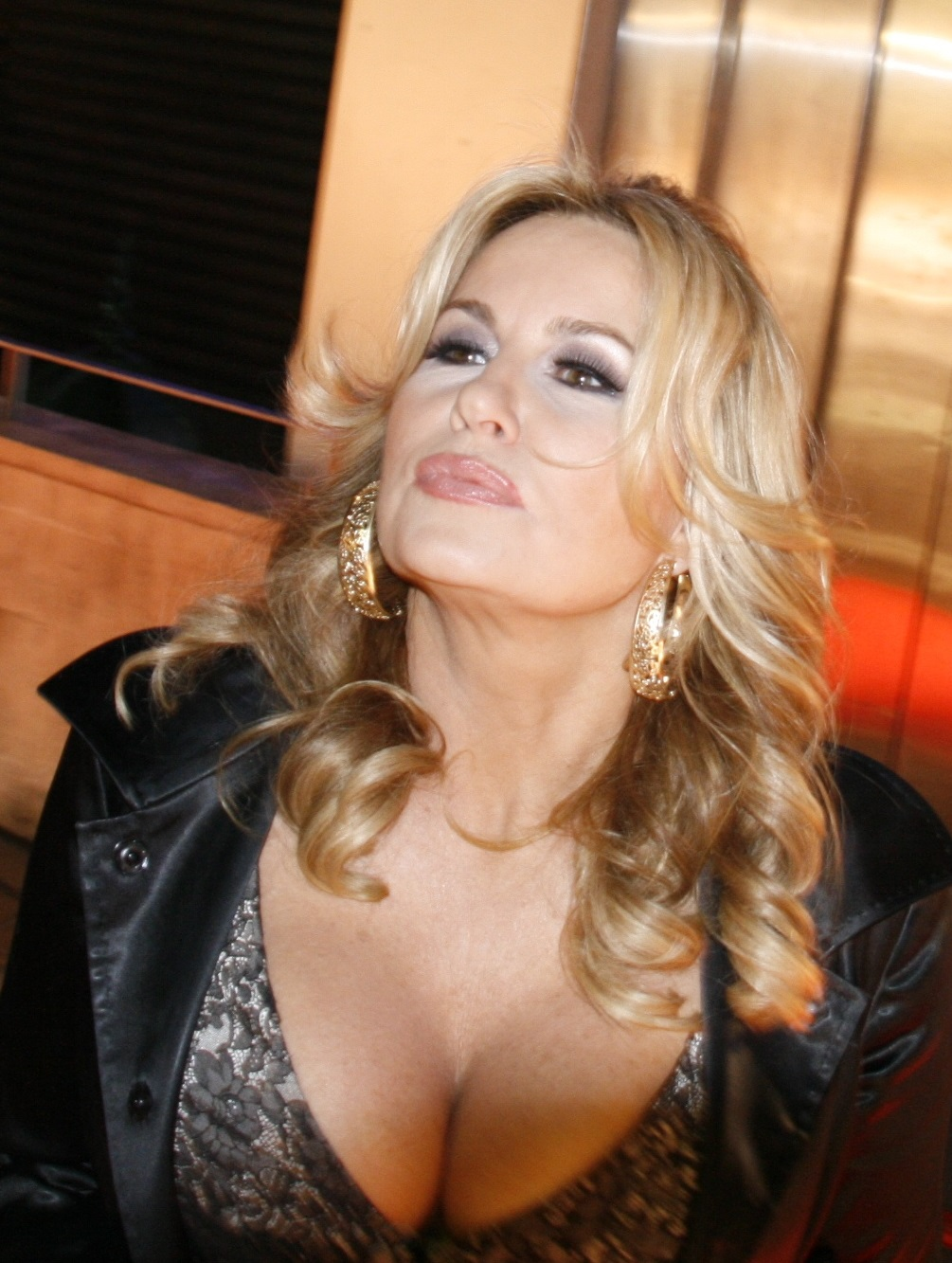
Jennifer Coolidge won for The White Lotus (2022).

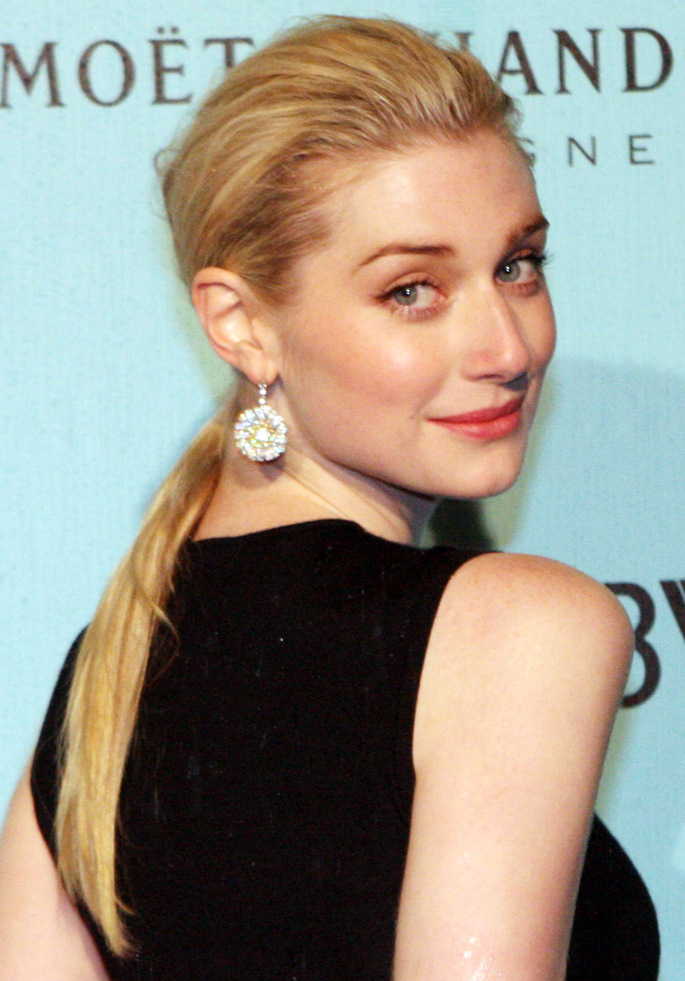
Elizabeth Debicki won for The Crown (2023).

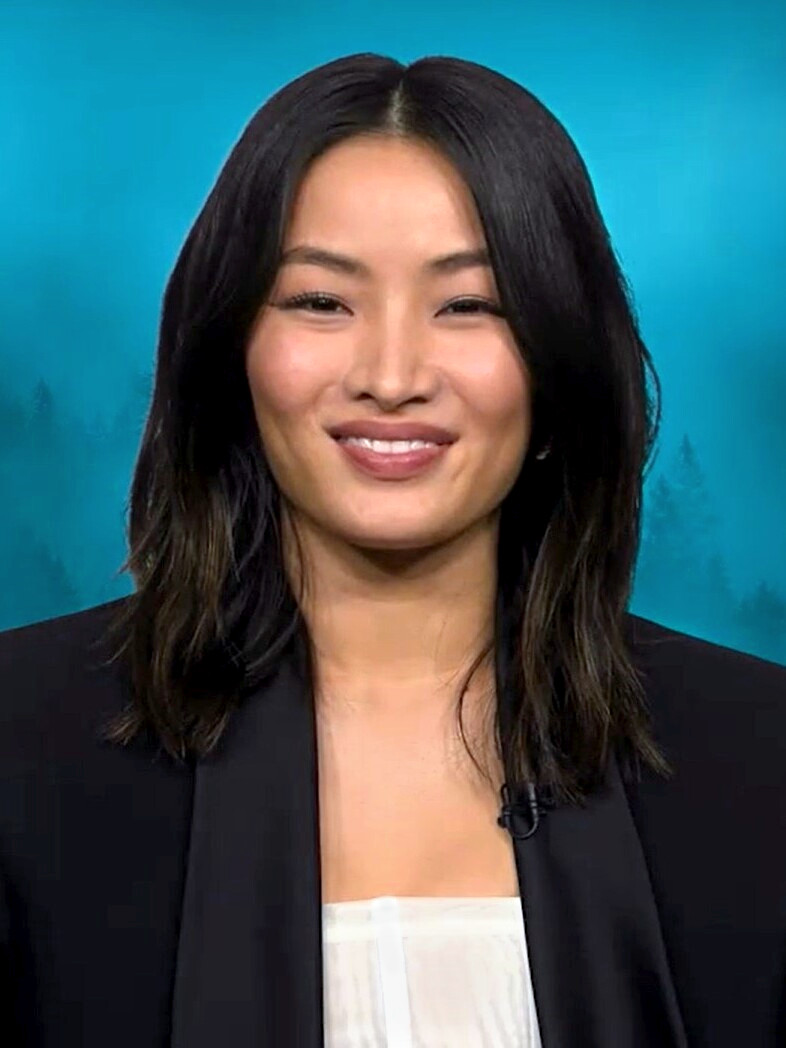
Anna Sawai won for Shōgun (2024).

=== 1990s ===
Year	Actress	Film	Role(s)	Ref.
1994 (1st)	Kathy Baker	Picket Fences	Jill Brock	
1994 (1st)	Swoosie Kurtz	Sisters	Alexandra Barker	
1994 (1st)	Angela Lansbury	Murder, She Wrote	Jessica Fletcher	
1994 (1st)	Jane Seymour	Dr. Quinn, Medicine Woman	Michaela Quinn	
1994 (1st)	Cicely Tyson	Sweet Justice	Carrie Grace Battle	
1995 (2nd)	Gillian Anderson	The X-Files	Dana Scully	
1995 (2nd)	Christine Lahti	Chicago Hope	Kathryn Austin	
1995 (2nd)	Sharon Lawrence	NYPD Blue	Sylvia Costas	
1995 (2nd)	Julianna Margulies	ER	Carol Hathaway	
1995 (2nd)	Sela Ward	Sisters	Theodora Sorenson	
1996 (3rd)	Gillian Anderson	The X-Files	Dana Scully	
1996 (3rd)	Kim Delaney	NYPD Blue	Diane Russell	
1996 (3rd)	Christine Lahti	Chicago Hope	Kathryn Austin	
1996 (3rd)	Della Reese	Touched by an Angel	Tess	
1996 (3rd)	Jane Seymour	Dr. Quinn, Medicine Woman	Michaela Quinn	
1997 (4th)	Julianna Margulies	ER	Carol Hathaway	
1997 (4th)	Gillian Anderson	The X-Files	Dana Scully	
1997 (4th)	Kim Delaney	NYPD Blue	Diane Russell	
1997 (4th)	Christine Lahti	Chicago Hope	Kathryn Austin	
1997 (4th)	Della Reese	Touched by an Angel	Tess	
1998 (5th)	Julianna Margulies	ER	Carol Hathaway	
1998 (5th)	Gillian Anderson	The X-Files	Dana Scully	
1998 (5th)	Kim Delaney	NYPD Blue	Diane Russell	
1998 (5th)	Christine Lahti	Chicago Hope	Kathryn Austin	
1998 (5th)	Annie Potts	Any Day Now	Mary Elizabeth Sims	
1999 (6th)	Edie Falco	The Sopranos	Carmela Soprano	
1999 (6th)	Lorraine Bracco	The Sopranos	Jennifer Melfi	
1999 (6th)	Nancy Marchand	The Sopranos	Livia Soprano	
1999 (6th)	Gillian Anderson	The X-Files	Dana Scully	
1999 (6th)	Annie Potts	Any Day Now	Mary Elizabeth Sims	

=== 2000s ===
Year	Actress	Film	Role(s)	Ref.
2000 (7th)	Allison Janney	The West Wing	Claudia Jean "C. J." Cregg	
2000 (7th)	Gillian Anderson	The X-Files	Dana Scully	
2000 (7th)	Edie Falco	The Sopranos	Carmela Soprano	
2000 (7th)	Sally Field	ER	Maggie Wyczenski	
2000 (7th)	Lauren Graham	Gilmore Girls	Lorelai Gilmore	
2000 (7th)	Sela Ward	Once and Again	Lily Manning	
2001 (8th)	Allison Janney	The West Wing	C. J. Cregg	
2001 (8th)	Lorraine Bracco	The Sopranos	Jennifer Melfi	
2001 (8th)	Stockard Channing	The West Wing	Abbey Bartlet	
2001 (8th)	Tyne Daly	Judging Amy	Maxine Gray	
2001 (8th)	Edie Falco	The Sopranos	Carmela Soprano	
2001 (8th)	Lauren Graham	Gilmore Girls	Lorelai Gilmore	
2002 (9th)	Edie Falco	The Sopranos	Carmela Soprano	
2002 (9th)	Lorraine Bracco	The Sopranos	Jennifer Melfi	
2002 (9th)	Amy Brenneman	Judging Amy	Amy Gray	
2002 (9th)	Allison Janney	The West Wing	C. J. Cregg	
2002 (9th)	Lily Tomlin	The West Wing	Deborah Fiderer	
2003 (10th)	Frances Conroy	Six Feet Under	Ruth Fisher	
2003 (10th)	Stockard Channing	The West Wing	Abbey Bartlet	
2003 (10th)	Tyne Daly	Judging Amy	Maxine Gray	
2003 (10th)	Jennifer Garner	Alias	Sydney Bristow	
2003 (10th)	Mariska Hargitay	Law & Order: Special Victims Unit	Olivia Benson	
2003 (10th)	Allison Janney	The West Wing	C. J. Cregg	
2004 (11th)	Jennifer Garner	Alias	Sydney Bristow	
2004 (11th)	Drea de Matteo	The Sopranos	Adriana La Cerva	
2004 (11th)	Edie Falco	The Sopranos	Carmela Soprano	
2004 (11th)	Allison Janney	The West Wing	C. J. Cregg	
2004 (11th)	Christine Lahti	Jack & Bobby	Grace McCallister	
2005 (12th)	Sandra Oh	Grey's Anatomy	Cristina Yang	
2005 (12th)	Patricia Arquette	Medium	Allison Dubois	
2005 (12th)	Geena Davis	Commander in Chief	Mackenzie Allen	
2005 (12th)	Mariska Hargitay	Law & Order: Special Victims Unit	Olivia Benson	
2005 (12th)	Kyra Sedgwick	The Closer	Brenda Leigh Johnson	
2006 (13th)	Chandra Wilson	Grey's Anatomy	Miranda Bailey	
2006 (13th)	Patricia Arquette	Medium	Allison Dubois	
2006 (13th)	Edie Falco	The Sopranos	Carmela Soprano	
2006 (13th)	Mariska Hargitay	Law & Order: Special Victims Unit	Olivia Benson	
2006 (13th)	Kyra Sedgwick	The Closer	Brenda Leigh Johnson	
2007 (14th)	Edie Falco	The Sopranos	Carmela Soprano	
2007 (14th)	Glenn Close	Damages	Patty Hewes	
2007 (14th)	Sally Field	Brothers & Sisters	Nora Walker	
2007 (14th)	Holly Hunter	Saving Grace	Grace Hanadarko	
2007 (14th)	Kyra Sedgwick	The Closer	Brenda Leigh Johnson	
2008 (15th)	Sally Field	Brothers & Sisters	Nora Walker	
2008 (15th)	Mariska Hargitay	Law & Order: Special Victims Unit	Olivia Benson	
2008 (15th)	Holly Hunter	Saving Grace	Grace Hanadarko	
2008 (15th)	Elisabeth Moss	Mad Men	Peggy Olson	
2008 (15th)	Kyra Sedgwick	The Closer	Brenda Leigh Johnson	
2009 (16th)	Julianna Margulies	The Good Wife	Alicia Florrick	
2009 (16th)	Patricia Arquette	Medium	Allison Dubois	
2009 (16th)	Glenn Close	Damages	Patty Hewes	
2009 (16th)	Mariska Hargitay	Law & Order: Special Victims Unit	Olivia Benson	
2009 (16th)	Holly Hunter	Saving Grace	Grace Hanadarko	
2009 (16th)	Kyra Sedgwick	The Closer	Brenda Leigh Johnson	

=== 2010s ===
Year	Actress	Film	Role(s)	Ref.
2010 (17th)	Julianna Margulies	The Good Wife	Alicia Florrick	
2010 (17th)	Glenn Close	Damages	Patty Hewes	
2010 (17th)	Mariska Hargitay	Law & Order: Special Victims Unit	Olivia Benson	
2010 (17th)	Elisabeth Moss	Mad Men	Peggy Olson	
2010 (17th)	Kyra Sedgwick	The Closer	Brenda Leigh Johnson	
2011 (18th)	Jessica Lange	American Horror Story	Constance Langdon	
2011 (18th)	Kathy Bates	Harry's Law	Harriet "Harry" Korn	
2011 (18th)	Glenn Close	Damages	Patty Hewes	
2011 (18th)	Julianna Margulies	The Good Wife	Alicia Florrick	
2011 (18th)	Kyra Sedgwick	The Closer	Brenda Leigh Johnson	
2012 (19th)	Claire Danes	Homeland	Carrie Mathison	
2012 (19th)	Michelle Dockery	Downton Abbey	Lady Mary Crawley	
2012 (19th)	Jessica Lange	American Horror Story: Asylum	Sister Jude / Judy Martin	
2012 (19th)	Julianna Margulies	The Good Wife	Alicia Florrick	
2012 (19th)	Maggie Smith	Downton Abbey	Violet, Dowager Countess of Grantham	
2013 (20th)	Maggie Smith	Downton Abbey	Violet, Dowager Countess of Grantham	
2013 (20th)	Claire Danes	Homeland	Carrie Mathison	
2013 (20th)	Anna Gunn	Breaking Bad	Skyler White	
2013 (20th)	Jessica Lange	American Horror Story: Coven	Fiona Goode	
2013 (20th)	Kerry Washington	Scandal	Olivia Pope	
2014 (21st)	Viola Davis	How to Get Away with Murder	Professor Annalise Keating, J.D.	
2014 (21st)	Claire Danes	Homeland	Carrie Mathison	
2014 (21st)	Julianna Margulies	The Good Wife	Alicia Florrick	
2014 (21st)	Tatiana Maslany	Orphan Black	Various	
2014 (21st)	Maggie Smith	Downton Abbey	Violet, Dowager Countess of Grantham	
2014 (21st)	Robin Wright	House of Cards	Claire Underwood	
2015 (22nd)	Viola Davis	How to Get Away with Murder	Professor Annalise Keating, J.D.	
2015 (22nd)	Claire Danes	Homeland	Carrie Mathison	
2015 (22nd)	Julianna Margulies	The Good Wife	Alicia Florrick	
2015 (22nd)	Maggie Smith	Downton Abbey	Violet, Dowager Countess of Grantham	
2015 (22nd)	Robin Wright	House of Cards	Claire Underwood	
2016 (23rd)	Claire Foy	The Crown	Queen Elizabeth II	
2016 (23rd)	Millie Bobby Brown	Stranger Things	Eleven / Jane	
2016 (23rd)	Thandiwe Newton	Westworld	Maeve Millay	
2016 (23rd)	Winona Ryder	Stranger Things	Joyce Byers	
2016 (23rd)	Robin Wright	House of Cards	Claire Underwood	
2017 (24th)	Claire Foy	The Crown	Queen Elizabeth II	
2017 (24th)	Millie Bobby Brown	Stranger Things	Eleven / Jane	
2017 (24th)	Laura Linney	Ozark	Wendy Byrde	
2017 (24th)	Elisabeth Moss	The Handmaid's Tale	June Osborne / Offred	
2017 (24th)	Robin Wright	House of Cards	Claire Underwood	
2018 (25th)	Sandra Oh	Killing Eve	Eve Polastri	
2018 (25th)	Julia Garner	Ozark	Ruth Langmore	
2018 (25th)	Laura Linney	Ozark	Wendy Byrde	
2018 (25th)	Elisabeth Moss	The Handmaid's Tale	June Osborne / Offred	
2018 (25th)	Robin Wright	House of Cards	President Claire Underwood	
2019 (26th)	Jennifer Aniston	The Morning Show	Alex Levy	
2019 (26th)	Helena Bonham Carter	The Crown	Princess Margaret, Countess of Snowdon	
2019 (26th)	Olivia Colman	The Crown	Queen Elizabeth II	
2019 (26th)	Jodie Comer	Killing Eve	Villanelle	
2019 (26th)	Elisabeth Moss	The Handmaid's Tale	June Osborne / Offred	

=== 2020s ===
Year	Actress	Film	Role(s)	Ref.
2020 (27th)	Gillian Anderson	The Crown	Margaret Thatcher	
2020 (27th)	Olivia Colman	The Crown	Queen Elizabeth II	
2020 (27th)	Emma Corrin	The Crown	Lady Diana Spencer	
2020 (27th)	Julia Garner	Ozark	Ruth Langmore	
2020 (27th)	Laura Linney	Ozark	Wendy Byrde	
2021 (28th)	Jung Ho-yeon	Squid Game	Kang Sae-byeok	
2021 (28th)	Jennifer Aniston	The Morning Show	Alex Levy	
2021 (28th)	Elisabeth Moss	The Handmaid's Tale	June Osborne	
2021 (28th)	Sarah Snook	Succession	Shiv Roy	
2021 (28th)	Reese Witherspoon	The Morning Show	Bradley Jackson	
2022 (29th)	Jennifer Coolidge	The White Lotus	Tanya McQuoid-Hunt	
2022 (29th)	Elizabeth Debicki	The Crown	Princess Diana	
2022 (29th)	Julia Garner	Ozark	Ruth Langmore	
2022 (29th)	Laura Linney	Ozark	Wendy Byrde	
2022 (29th)	Zendaya	Euphoria	Rue Bennett	
2023 (30th)	Elizabeth Debicki	The Crown	Diana, Princess of Wales	
2023 (30th)	Jennifer Aniston	The Morning Show	Alex Levy	
2023 (30th)	Bella Ramsey	The Last of Us	Ellie	
2023 (30th)	Keri Russell	The Diplomat	Kate Wyler	
2023 (30th)	Sarah Snook	Succession	Shiv Roy	
2024 (31st)	Anna Sawai	Shōgun	Toda Mariko	
2024 (31st)	Kathy Bates	Matlock	Madeline Matlock	
2024 (31st)	Nicola Coughlan	Bridgerton	Penelope Featherington	
2024 (31st)	Allison Janney	The Diplomat	Vice President Grace Penn	
2024 (31st)	Keri Russell	The Diplomat	Kate Wyler	
2025 (32nd)	Keri Russell	The Diplomat	Kate Wyler	
2025 (32nd)	Britt Lower	Severance	Helly R.	
2025 (32nd)	Parker Posey	The White Lotus	Victoria Ratliff	
2025 (32nd)	Rhea Seehorn	Pluribus	Carol Sturka	
2025 (32nd)	Aimee Lou Wood	The White Lotus	Chelsea	

== Superlatives ==
Superlative	Female Actor - Drama Series		Female Actor - Comedy Series		Overall	
Actress with most awards	Julianna Margulies	4	Julia Louis-Dreyfus	5	Julia Louis-Dreyfus	5
Actress with most nominations	Julianna Margulies	9	Julia Louis-Dreyfus	12	Edie Falco	14
Actress with most nominations without ever winning	Kyra Sedgwick	7	Edie Falco	7	Kyra Sedgwick	7
Television program with most wins	The Crown	4	30 Rock	4	30 Rock / The Crown	4
Television program with most nominations	The Sopranos	12	Will & Grace	9	The Sopranos	12

== Actors with multiple awards ==
4 wins

- Julianna Margulies

3 wins

- Gillian Anderson
- Edie Falco

2 wins

- Viola Davis
- Claire Foy
- Allison Janney
- Sandra Oh

== Series with multiple awards ==
4 wins

- The Crown

3 wins

- The Sopranos (HBO)

2 wins

- ER (NBC)
- The Good Wife (CBS)
- Grey's Anatomy (ABC)
- How to Get Away with Murder (ABC)
- The West Wing (NBC)
- The X-Files (Fox)

== Actors with multiple nominations ==
9 nominations

- Julianna Margulies

7 nominations

- Gillian Anderson
- Edie Falco
- Kyra Sedgwick

6 nominations

- Mariska Hargitay
- Allison Janney
- Elisabeth Moss

5 nominations

- Christine Lahti
- Robin Wright

4 nominations

- Glenn Close
- Claire Danes
- Laura Linney
- Maggie Smith

3 nominations

- Jennifer Aniston
- Patricia Arquette
- Lorraine Bracco
- Kim Delaney
- Sally Field
- Julia Garner
- Holly Hunter
- Jessica Lange
- Keri Russell

2 nominations

- Kathy Bates
- Millie Bobby Brown
- Stockard Channing
- Olivia Colman
- Tyne Daly
- Viola Davis
- Elizabeth Debicki
- Claire Foy
- Jennifer Garner
- Lauren Graham
- Sandra Oh
- Annie Potts
- Della Reese
- Jane Seymour
- Sarah Snook
- Sela Ward

== Series with multiple nominations ==
12 nominations

- The Sopranos (HBO)

9 nominations

- The Crown (Netflix)

8 nominations

- The West Wing (NBC)

7 nominations

- The Closer (TNT)
- Ozark (Netflix)

6 nominations

- The Good Wife (CBS)
- Law & Order: Special Victims Unit (NBC)
- The X-Files (Fox)

5 nominations

- Downton Abbey (PBS)
- House of Cards (Netflix)

4 nominations

- Chicago Hope (CBS)
- Damages (FX)
- The Diplomat (Netflix)
- ER (NBC)
- The Handmaid's Tale (Hulu)
- Homeland (Showtime)
- The Morning Show (AppleTV+)
- NYPD Blue (ABC)

3 nominations

- American Horror Story (FX)
- Judging Amy (CBS)
- Medium (NBC/CBS)
- Saving Grace (TNT)
- Stranger Things (Netflix)
- The White Lotus (HBO)

2 nominations

- Alias (ABC)
- Any Day Now (Lifetime)
- Brothers & Sisters (ABC)
- Dr. Quinn, Medicine Woman (CBS)
- Gilmore Girls (The WB)
- Grey's Anatomy (ABC)
- How to Get Away with Murder (ABC)
- Killing Eve (BBC America)
- Mad Men (AMC)
- Sisters (NBC)
- Succession (HBO)
- Touched by an Angel (CBS)

== See also ==
- Golden Globe Award for Best Actress – Television Series Drama
- Primetime Emmy Award for Outstanding Lead Actress in a Drama Series
- Primetime Emmy Award for Outstanding Supporting Actress in a Drama Series
