= Ellen Parsons =

- Damages character
- First appearance: "Get Me a Lawyer"
- Last appearance: "But You Don't Do That Anymore"
- Created by: Glenn Kessler & Todd A. Kessler & Daniel Zelman
- Portrayed by: Rose Byrne

In-universe information
- Occupation: Lawyer
- Spouse: David Connor (fiance; deceased)
- Children: Girl (unnamed)

Ellen Parsons is a fictional character on the American legal thriller series Damages. The character was created by the writer trio of Glenn Kessler, Todd A. Kessler, and Daniel Zelman.

Ellen's transformation from ambitious, idealistic and somewhat naïve law school graduate to a sophisticated, ruthless attorney is one of the main themes of the show. The mentor-protegee relationship between her and Patty Hewes shapes and advances the character throughout the show. After working for Patty, being an informant for the FBI, and joining the public attorney's office, she finally opens her own law firm and builds a name for herself.

In the series finale, Ellen gives up being a lawyer after learning that she is pregnant and becomes a happy wife and mother. Patty enters a shop where Ellen and her daughter are happily looking at goodies. Ellen sees Patty but ignores her. We see Ellen and her child leaving the store and talking about going to see "daddy" who we assume is Chris. Back in her car, Patty fantasizes that Ellen approaches the car and through the window thanks her for all she's done for her. Patty pulls herself back to reality and is last seen contemplating her life...successful, yet entirely alone.

The character was widely praised, as well as Byrne's portrayal. Byrne was nominated twice for a Primetime Emmy Award for Outstanding Supporting Actress in a Drama Series in 2009 and 2010, and twice for a Golden Globe Award for Best Supporting Actress – Series, Miniseries, or Television Film in 2008 and 2010.
