= Patty Hewes =

Fictional character in the American legal thriller Damages

- Damages character
- First appearance: "Get Me a Lawyer"
- Last appearance: "But You Don't Do That Anymore"
- Created by: Todd A. Kessler, Glenn Kessler & Daniel Zelman
- Portrayed by: Glenn Close

In-universe information
- Occupation: Lawyer
- Family: Kate Franklin (half-sister)
- Spouse: Phil Grey (divorced)
- Children: Julia Hewes (stillborn); Michael Hewes (deceased)
- Relatives: Catherine Hewes (grandchild; legal guardian)

Patricia "Patty" C. Hewes is a fictional character on the American legal thriller Damages, portrayed by Glenn Close. Being described as "ruthless", "master manipulator" and "brilliant", Patty is a high-stakes litigator managing her own law firm called Hewes & Associates. Conceived as a "woman who commands power and influence in a male-dominated world" the character and its portrayal by Close has garnered significant praise.

Serving as the show's protagonist, Patty's and Ellen's mentor-protégée relationship is the focal point of the show. Starting as ordinary associates and eventually progressing to a mother-daughter like relationship. Patty's behavior towards her opponents (most notably Arthur Frobisher), clients and her estranged relations with her son Michael are recurring storylines that are frequently explored.

Since the show's pilot episode Patty's character and Close's performance are subjects of frequent praise. One example is Tim Goodman of the San Francisco Chronicle who wrote that "it's Close who makes Damages a series to contend with" and called her "compelling". Close's portrayal earned her numerous awards, including two Primetime Emmy Awards for Outstanding Lead Actress in a Drama Series and one Golden Globe Award for Best Actress – Television Series Drama among others.

== Character history ==
=== Background ===
Patty and her mother suffered at the hands of her father, who was a sadistic, drunk, bully. As such, Patty developed a hatred for those who use their positions of power to bully and torment others. She married young, to a man who supported her as she made her way through law school. But she remained pregnant while landing a job at a powerful law firm in New York City. Her first husband demanded that she turn down the job and postpone her dreams of becoming a lawyer in order to raise their child. And, after being told that her pregnancy would require her to stay in bed, Patty opted to induce a miscarriage while riding a horse. The loss of her child (a girl) would haunt Patty, who quickly divorced her husband and began her law career.

She moved to New York City and became a successful lawyer, one whose ruthlessness was matched by her corruption. In one of the defining cases of her career, Patty convinced a company scientist, Daniel Purcell (William Hurt), to throw his deposition in order to win her case. Patty and Daniel had a brief affair during this period, resulting in the birth of Patty's only child, a son named Michael (Zachary Booth). She also remarried, to a successful stock broker, Phil Grey (Michael Nouri), who helped her raise her son as his own and constantly supported her in her work. Her busy life led to estranged relations with both of them: Michael inherited his mother's ruthlessness and turned to a life of intrigues and manipulations and her constantly undermined husband Phil becomes unfaithful.

She devotes her life on taking down "bullies", corrupt men that misuse their power and position. And at the time she meets young and bright Ellen Parsons (Rose Byrne) she is in midst of the biggest case in her career. Billionaire Arthur Frobisher (Ted Danson), accused of insider trading, becomes her ultimate opponent. But in order to incriminate him she has to reach Katie Connor (Anastasia Griffith), the only witness of his scheme. Katie Connor is the sister of David Connor (Noah Bean), Ellen's fiancé. Patty grabs the opportunity and hires Ellen, and a complex game of cat and mouse begins as she starts incriminating Frobisher.

=== In-series story-lines ===
Patty begins to realize Ellen's true potential and decides to mentor her. However, at the very end of the case Patty blackmails Frobisher's lawyer Ray Fiske (Željko Ivanek) and he commits suicide in Patty's office. Patty confides in Ellen but soon sees her as a liability and arranges for her to be murdered. She is guilt-stricken by her decision and realizes that Ellen has become the surrogate of her dead daughter. However, Ellen survives and is being accused of the murder of her fiancé at the time Patty re-enters her life. Patty helps her with the charges and Ellen returns to work for her. Unknown to Patty, Ellen has decided to take down Patty and becomes an informant for the FBI. Soon after, Patty reunites with Daniel Purcell, who has killed his wife. Patty targets Daniel's corporation, whose corrupt influence stretches throughout New York City and beyond. Patty also realizes that she's being investigated by the FBI. Uncle Pete (who arranged the hit on Ellen) is arrested and attempts suicide while in custody, in order to avoid being forced to implicate Patty. He's taken to hospital, where Patrick comes to visit him (with a syringe of something). Patrick adds the contents of the syringe to Uncle Pete's I.V., then calls Patty to let her know that Uncle Pete is dead. Patty manages to weave a complex scheme to clear her name and bring down her season two nemesis, but at the cost of being stabbed by a corrupt executive, losing her husband (whose infidelity is revealed to the world due to Ellen's scheming), and ultimately Ellen herself, who resigns from the law firm after holding Patty at gunpoint and forcing her to confess her role in the hit on Ellen.

In the third season, Patty targets the Tobin family, whose investment company has been revealed to be one big Ponzi scheme. With Ellen now working as a prosecutor, Patty seeks to find out where the Tobin family is hiding the money, not knowing that Ellen is secretly helping Patty's longtime associate, Tom Shayes (Tate Donovan), find the money as well, after it is revealed that he lost his life savings in the scheme. Patty's relationship with her son also collapses, when she finds out that he is marrying an older woman, who became pregnant when the two had sex prior to his becoming legally able to consent to sex. Her son seeks revenge by ramming her car with his in an assassination attempt, which is followed up by the revelation that the Tobins had a hand in Tom's murder. Tom's death brings Patty and Ellen closer, reconciling the two. Some time later, Ellen starts making a name for herself and decides to take down High Star, a defense contractor, and its owner, Howard Erickson (John Goodman). Ellen seeks help from Patty, who crosses the moral line once again when she puts Chris Sanchez's (Chris Messina) life in danger so she can win the case. Chris, a High Star employee and a high school friend of Ellen's, survives his near-death experience and reunites with Ellen. Ellen becomes the only witness against Patty in a custody battle.

The last season begins with Patty scrambling to have Ellen removed from the witness stand in the custody trial. After filing a motion to do so, the judge refuses to dismiss Ellen. Shortly after, Patty finds her ace in the hole: she recommends Ellen to Channing McClaren, the owner of a WikiLeaks-type website called McClarentruth.org, after he asks Patty to represent him. Seconds before Ellen gives her testimony, Patty announces her intention to sue McClaren on behalf of the daughter of one of McClaren's exposed sources whose murder was ruled a suicide, resulting in a conflict of interest and Ellen's removal from the witness list.

A long time after the case, Ellen and Patty inadvertently meet in a shop with Ellen's daughter. Judging from Patty's still having an office in New York, she did not become an Associate Justice of the United States Supreme Court as she once considered, but continued her practice. Ellen, however, has left the legal profession and has devoted herself to family life. A delusional Patty imagines Ellen thanking her for all the good she has done for her. The truth, however, is uglier than it seems, and Ellen deliberately ignores Patty. The final scene shows Patty bitter and alone in the back of her car with her career, the last thing she still has.

== Development ==
=== Conception and casting ===
The creators of Damages pitched the project to The FX channel, lured by the network's pedigree of having complex, "antisocial" and "twisted" protagonists in their shows. They envisioned a relationship between a mentor and a protégée as the core of the series' concept, with an emphasis on the "female power" in today's modern and dynamic world. The prime idea was creating an intimidating and somewhat dangerous woman who wields power, with a young and inexperienced "mentee" under her wing. Although not specifying the setting of the show, the legal world seemed adequate, because of the "power games" between the two female leads. Like the morally ambiguous character of Vic Mackey (Michael Chiklis) on The Shield, the producers conceived Patty as non-evil but a strong and powerful person.

Having previously starred in The Shield's fourth season as Monica Rawling, also a powerful woman, Close approached FX president John Landgraf about the possibility of a spin-off series about Rawling. Her only condition was that the show be shot in New York City, where she resides. Soon afterwards Landgraf suggested the role of Patty Hewes, which Close accepted. She was aware that many people felt television was very beneath a five-time Academy Award nominee, but responded: "[If] It's good writing, what difference does it make where it is?". As an additional television experience, Close quoted her work on the television film, Something About Amelia, which also stars her Damages co-star Ted Danson. After a three-hour meeting with the creators, Close accepted the role, impressed particularly by the powerful persona of the character "as the head of her own law firm ... in a male-dominated world."

In preparation for the role, Close met with several female attorneys in New York, including Mary Jo White, Lorna Scofield and Patricia Hynes. Close said that the time she spend with the real-life attorneys was more than rewarding. She stated: "They were fascinating to talk to, just the whole issue of what it's like to keep your power. It does make a difference for a woman", and added: "... I heard some stories about meeting a client for the first time and the client saying, 'Oh, you're a woman.' I find that interesting. And the cost, what did it cost them to get [to the top]." As an additional base for the character many and Close herself have cited two characters that Close have previously played, those of Alex Forrest and the Marquise de Merteuil from the films Fatal Attraction and Dangerous Liaisons respectively.

== Reception ==
From the first episode of the show, Patty Hewes received strong praise. David Hinckley of the New York Daily News has called the character "the new J.R. Ewing – someone who's rich, powerful, unscrupulous, conniving and charismatic. And this time, this 21st-century approximation of J.R. is played by a woman." Numerous critics thought that Close and her portrayal of Patty are the main reason for the show's critical success. One such critic was Tim Goodman of the San Francisco Chronicle who wrote that "it's Close who makes Damages a series to contend with". However, some reviewers have criticized the character's "false complexity", by stating that her psychotic behavior is not grounded, with nothing else but psychological explanations. Heather Havrileskey of Salon.com has named Patty part of FX's myriad of "psychopaths", "histrionics", "schizophrenics" and "tyrants", but referred to her in particular as "a perennial wacko". She concludes by saying that Patty is more morally corrupt and villainous than the show's central villain Arthur Frobisher (Ted Danson).

By the end of the season, the character reached near widespread acclaim. At the beginning of the second season Heather Harvileskey called Patty "more sympathetic" and "fragile" than before mainly because of the character of Daniel Purcell, played by William Hurt, an old acquaintance and flame of Patty's.
