= List of Once Upon a Time characters =

The characters of ABC's Once Upon a Time and its spin-off Once Upon a Time in Wonderland are related to classic fairy tale and fantasy characters, and often tie-in with other Disney media properties.

== Cast ==
=== Main cast ===
List indicators

This section includes characters who have appeared in the series as credited cast.

- An empty grey cell indicates the character was not in the season.
- ^{O} indicates an older version of the character.
- ^{Y} indicates a younger version of the character.
- ^{D} indicates that the character appeared with the use of a body double replacing the credited actor.

= Main cast (credited)
= Recurring cast (3+)
= Guest cast (1-2)

Actor / Actress	Counterpart		Once Upon a Time							W
Actor / Actress	Original	Real world	1	2	3	4	5	6	7	1
Ginnifer Goodwin	Snow White	Mary Margaret Blanchard	Main	Main	Main	Main	Main	Main	SG	
Jennifer Morrison	Emma Swan	—N/a	Main	Main	Main	Main	Main	Main	SG	^{D}
Lana Parrilla	Regina Mills / Evil Queen	Roni	Main	Main	Main	Main	Main	Main	Main	
Lana Parrilla	Evil Queen (Serum)	—N/a					Main (Note: The serum version of the Evil Queen appears in only one episode of the fifth season. As she is portrayed by starring cast member Parrilla, she is billed as a main character regardless.)	Main		
Josh Dallas	David / Prince Charming	David Nolan	Main	Main	Main	Main	Main	Main	SG	
Jared S. Gilmore	Henry Daniel Mills	—N/a	Main	Main	Main	Main	Main	Main	R^{Y}	
Andrew J. West	Henry Daniel Mills	—N/a						G^{O}	M	
Raphael Sbarge	Jiminy Cricket	Dr. Archibald Hopper	M	R	R	G		R	G	
Jamie Dornan	Huntsman	Sheriff Graham Humbert	M (Note: Dornan is credited as a guest star in the final episode but as main in all of his other appearances.)	G						
Robert Carlyle	Rumplestiltskin	Mr. Gold / Det. Weaver	Main	Main	Main	Main	Main	Main	Main	
Robert Carlyle	Rumplestiltskin (Wish Realm)	—N/a						Main (Note: The Wish Realm version of Rumplestiltskin appears in two episodes of the sixth season and four episodes of the seventh season. As he is portrayed by starring cast member Carlyle, he is billed as a main character regardless.)	Main	
Eion Bailey	Pinocchio	August Wayne Booth	M (Note: Bailey is billed as recurring during the first half of the first season and is billed main in the second half of the season.)	R		R		G		
Emilie de Ravin	Belle French	Lacey	R	Main	Main	Main	Main	Main	SG	
Meghan Ory	Red Lucas	Ruby	R	M	R		R			^{D}
Colin O'Donoghue	Killian Jones / Hook	—N/a		Main (Note: O’Donoghue is billed as recurring during the first half of the second season and is billed main in the second half of the season.)	Main	Main	Main	Main	Main	
Colin O'Donoghue	Hook (Wish Realm)	Det. Rogers						Main (Note: The Wish Realm version of Hook appears in only one episode of the sixth season. As he is portrayed by starring cast member O'Donoghue, he is billed as a main character regardless.)	Main	
Michael Raymond-James	Baelfire	Neal Cassidy		R	M		G			
Michael Socha	Will Scarlet / Knave of Hearts / White King	—N/a				M				M
Rebecca Mader	Zelena / Wicked Witch of the West	Kelly West			R	R	Main	Main	R	
Tom Ellis	Robin Hood	—N/a		G						
Sean Maguire	Robin Hood	—N/a			R	R	M		Guest	Guest
Sean Maguire	Robin of Locksley (Wish Realm)	—N/a						R		
Dania Ramirez	Ella	Jacinda Vidrio							M	
Gabrielle Anwar	Rapunzel Tremaine	Victoria Belfrey							M (Note: Anwar is billed as main for the first eleven episodes of the seventh season.)	
Alison Fernandez	Lucy Mills	Lucy Vidrio						G	M	
Mekia Cox	Queen Tiana	Sabine							M (Note: Cox is billed as recurring during the first three episodes of the seventh season and is billed main from the fifth episode of the season.)	
Sophie Lowe	Alice	—N/a								M
Peter Gadiot	Cyrus	—N/a								M
Emma Rigby	Anastasia / Red Queen / White Queen	—N/a								M
Oded Fehr	Jafar	—N/a						R		
Naveen Andrews	Jafar	—N/a								M
John Lithgow	Percy / White Rabbit	—N/a								M

=== Recurring cast ===
= Recurring cast (3+)
= Guest cast (1-2)

Actor / Actress	Counterpart		Once Upon a Time							W
Actor / Actress	Original	Real world	1	2	3	4	5	6	7	1
Lee Arenberg	Dreamy / Grumpy	Leroy	Recurring	Recurring	Recurring	Recurring	Recurring	Recurring	Guest	Guest
Beverley Elliott	Widow Lucas / Granny	—N/a	Recurring	Recurring	Recurring	Recurring	Recurring	Recurring	G	
Keegan Connor Tracy	Reul Ghorm / Blue Fairy	Mother Superior	Recurring	Recurring	Recurring	Recurring	G	R	G	
David Anders	Dr. Victor Frankenstein	Dr. Whale	Recurring	Recurring	Recurring		Guest	Guest		
Tony Amendola	Geppetto	Marco	R	R	Guest	Guest		Guest	Guest	
Tony Perez	Prince Henry Mills	—N/a	R	G		Guest	Guest	Guest		
Giancarlo Esposito	Genie / Magic Mirror	Sidney Glass	R		Guest	Guest	Guest	Guest		
Alan Dale	King George	Albert Spencer	R	R				G		
Anastasia Griffith	Princess Abigail	Kathryn Nolan	R		G					
Sebastian Stan	Jefferson / Mad Hatter	—N/a	R	R						
Sarah Bolger	Princess Aurora	—N/a		R	R	G				
Julian Morris	Prince Phillip	—N/a		R	R					
Jamie Chung	Mulan	—N/a		R	G		G			
Barbara Hershey	Cora Mills / Queen of Hearts	—N/a	G	R		Guest	Guest			G
Chris Gauthier	William Smee	—N/a		R	R	G		G		
Chris Gauthier	William Smee (Wish Realm)	—N/a							R	
Ethan Embry	Owen Flynn	Greg Mendell		R	G					
Sonequa Martin-Green	Tamara	—N/a		R	G					
Parker Croft	Felix	—N/a		G	R					
Robbie Kay	Malcolm / Peter Pan / Pied Piper	—N/a			R		R			
Robbie Kay	Peter Pan (Wish Realm)	—N/a							G	
Rose McIver	Tinker Bell	—N/a			R			G		
JoAnna Garcia Swisher	Ariel	—N/a			R	G		G		
JoAnna Garcia Swisher	Queen Ariel (Wish Realm)	—N/a							G	
Freya Tingley	Wendy Darling	—N/a		G	R					
Georgina Haig	Queen Elsa	—N/a			^{D}	R				
Elizabeth Lail	Princess Anna	—N/a				R				
Christie Laing	Marian	—N/a		Guest	Guest	R				
Scott Michael Foster	Kristoff	—N/a				R				
Elizabeth Mitchell	Ingrid / Snow Queen	Sarah Fisher				R				
Timothy Webber	Apprentice	—N/a				R	G			
Timothy Webber	Apprentice (Wish Realm)	—N/a							G	
Kristin Bauer van Straten	Maleficent	—N/a	G	^{D}		R				G
Merrin Dungey	Ursula	—N/a				R				
Victoria Smurfit	Cruella De Vil	Cruella Feinberg				R	R			
Victoria Smurfit	Cruella De Vil (Wish Realm)	—N/a							G	
Patrick Fischler	Isaac Heller	—N/a				R		G		
Agnes Bruckner	Lilith Page	Starla				R				
Elliot Knight	Merlin	—N/a				(Note: Merlin was voiced by Jonathan Adams in the fourth season in a guest role.)	R			
Liam Garrigan	King Arthur	—N/a					R			
Amy Manson	Queen Merida	—N/a					R			
Joana Metrass	Queen Guinevere	—N/a					R			
Sinqua Walls	Sir Lancelot	—N/a		G			R			
Olivia Steele-Falconer	Violet Morgan	—N/a					R	R		
Emma Caulfield	Blind Witch	—N/a	G				R			
Greg Germann	Hades	—N/a					R			
Hank Harris	Dr. Henry Jekyll	—N/a					G	R		
Sam Witwer	Mr. Hyde	—N/a					G	R		
Giles Matthey	Gideon	—N/a						R	G	
Deniz Akdeniz	Aladdin	—N/a						R		
Karen David	Princess Jasmine	Shirin						R		
Jaime Murray	Fiona / Black Fairy	—N/a						R		
Sara Tomko	Tiger Lily	—N/a						R	G	
Adelaide Kane	Drizella Tremaine	Ivy Belfrey							R	
Rose Reynolds	Alice Jones	Tilly							R	
Yael Yurman	Anastasia	—N/a							R	
Emma Booth	Mother Gothel	Eloise Gardener							R	
Daniel Francis	Dr. Facilier	Mr. Baron Samdi							R	
Nathan Parsons	Hansel / Jack	Nick Branson							R	
Tiera Skovbye	Robin Hood	Margot					^{D}	^{D}	R	
Jeff Pierre	Prince Naveen	Drew							R	
Shaun Smyth	Edwin	—N/a								R
Iggy Pop	Caterpillar	—N/a	(Note: The Caterpillar was originally voiced by Roger Daltrey in Once Upon a Time. The character was recast to Iggy Pop for the Wonderland spin-off in a recurring role)							R
Brian George	Sultan of Lower Agrabah	—N/a								R
Lauren McKnight	Elizabeth / Lizard	—N/a								R
Zuleikha Robinson	Amara	—N/a								R
Heather Doerksen	Sarah	—N/a								R
Peta Sergeant	Jabberwocky	—N/a								R

== Main cast ==
=== Emma Swan ===
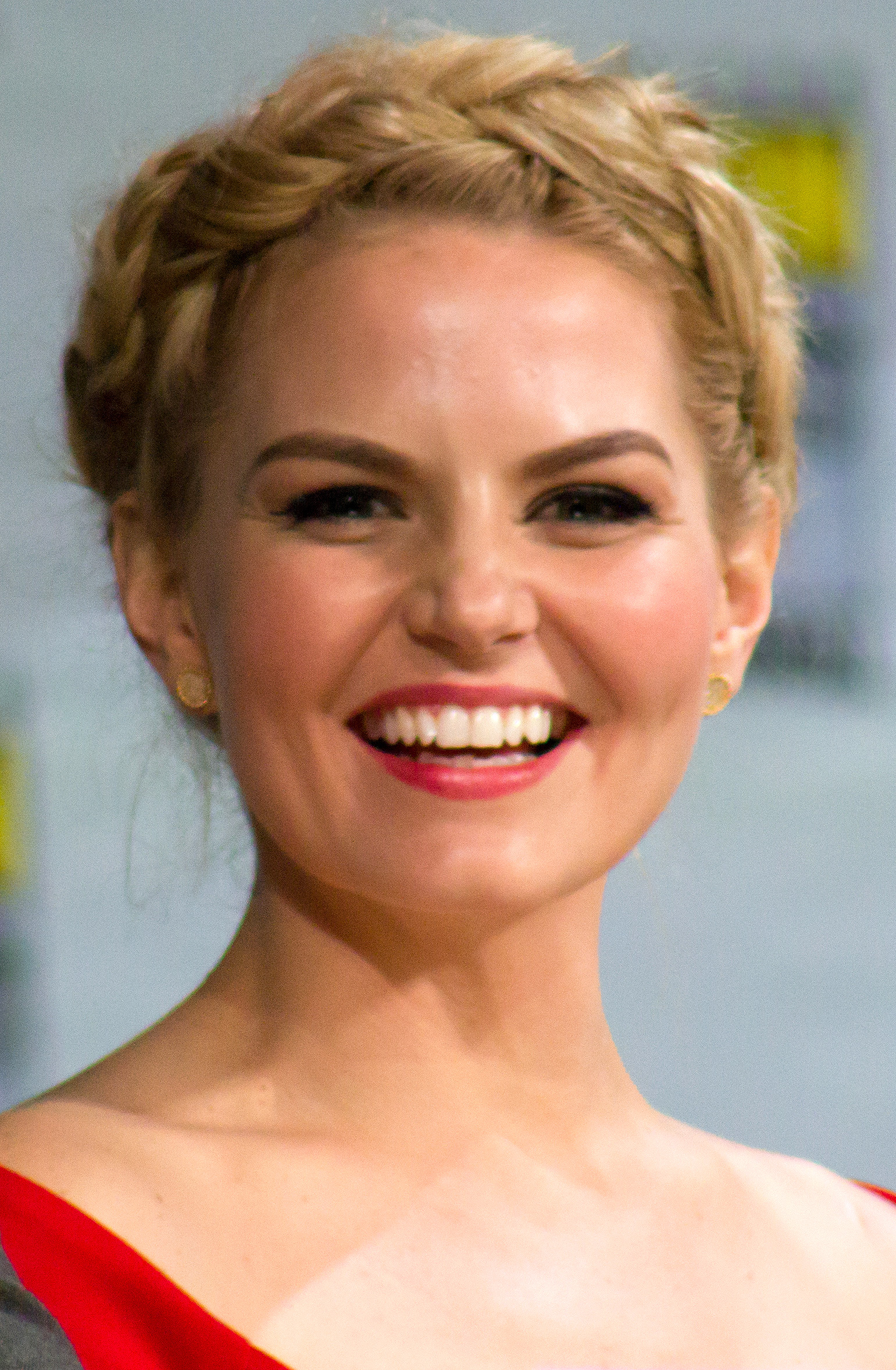
Jennifer Morrison

Emma Swan (seasons 1–7) portrayed by Jennifer Morrison (adult), Abby Ross (teen), and Mckenna Grace (kid), is the daughter of Snow White and Prince David, sister of Prince Neal, wife of Killian Jones, mother of Henry Mills and Hope, and grandmother of Lucy Mills.

=== Snow White ===
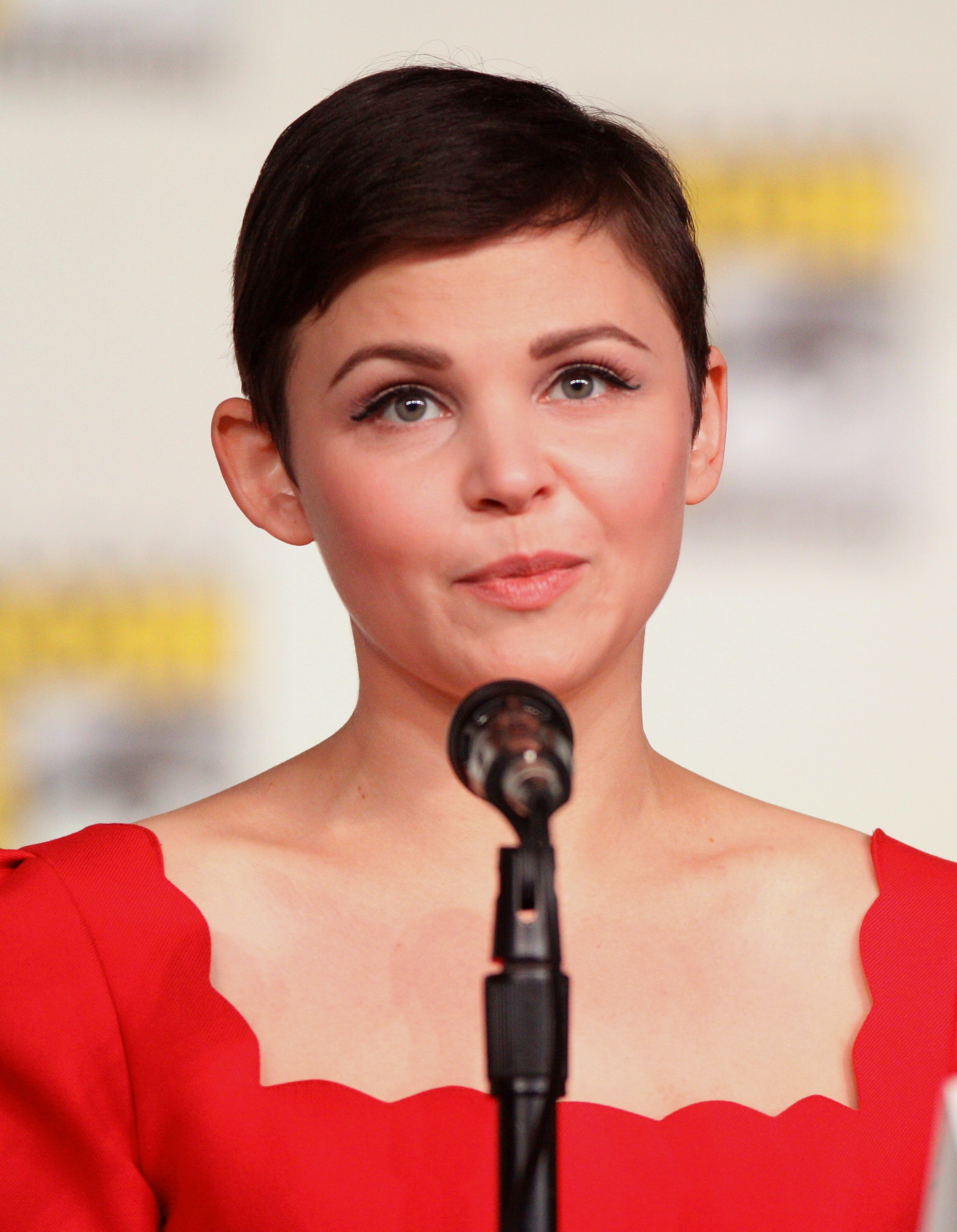
Ginnifer Goodwin

Snow White/Mary Margaret Blanchard (seasons 1–7), portrayed by Ginnifer Goodwin (adult) and Bailee Madison (young), is the daughter of King Leopold and Queen Eva, step-daughter of Regina Mills, wife of Prince David, mother of Emma Swan and Prince Neal, grandmother of Henry Mills and Hope, and great-grandmother of Lucy Mills. As a child, she was tricked into revealing a secret that results in Regina's transformation to the Evil Queen which subsequently leads to the casting of the curse. Separated from her daughter, she is reunited with Emma, and the rest of her family, after the curse breaks. Snow would then clash with Maleficent involving a secret past between them that is eventually resolved but caused by a mysterious author. After the merging of the realms, Snow crowns Regina as the Good Queen of the United Realms.

=== Regina Mills ===
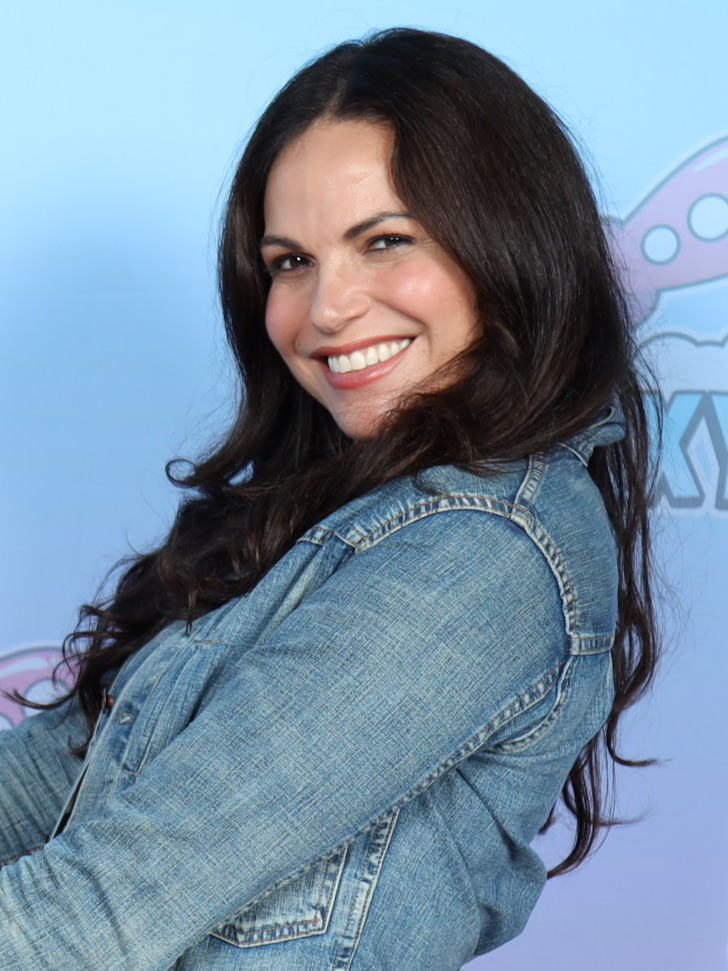
Lana Parilla

Regina Mills/Evil Queen/Roni (seasons 1–7), portrayed by Lana Parrilla (adult) and Ava Acres (young; episode "Sisters"), is the granddaughter of King Xavier, daughter of Cora Mills and Prince Henry, half-sister of Zelena "The Wicked Witch", adoptive mother of Henry Mills, adoptive grandmother of Lucy Mills, and mother-in-law to Cinderella. Regina is responsible for the casting of the original curse that ripped everyone to the Land Without Magic. However, with Emma's arrival and the curse breaking, Regina reforms her evil ways and seeks redemption for the sake of Henry. She later clashes with her half-sister, although the two patch things up eventually after the death of Regina's true love: Robin Hood. Regina is later swept by a new curse which eventually breaks and leads to the merger of all the realms, where she becomes the Good Queen.

Parrilla also portrays the Serum Evil Queen, the evil side of herself separated by Dr. Jekyll's potion in seasons 5–6.

=== David Nolan ===
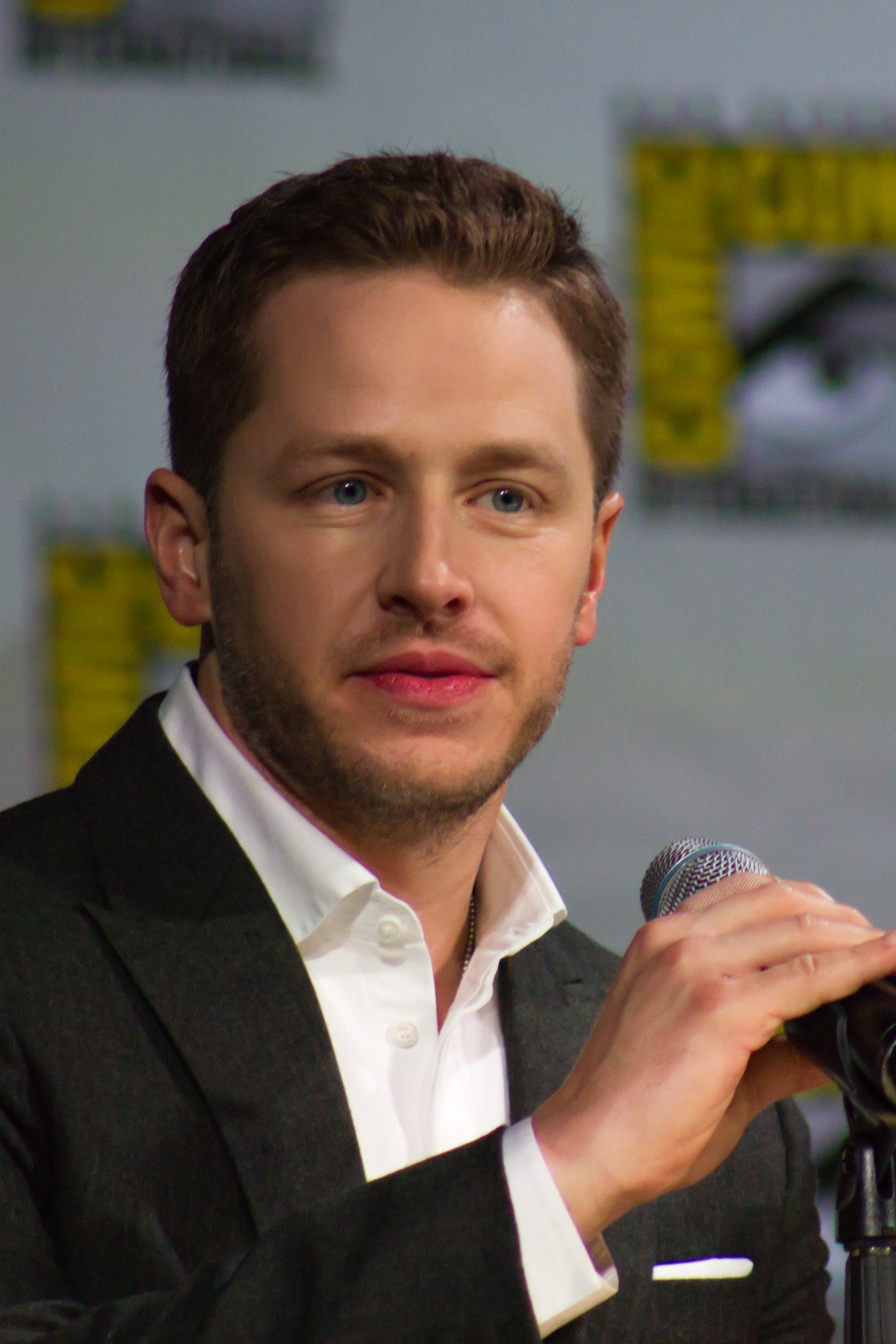
Josh Dallas

David Nolan/Prince Charming (seasons 1–7), portrayed by Josh Dallas (adult) and Luke Roessler (young), is the son of Ruth, twin brother of Prince James, husband of Snow White, father of Emma Swan and Prince Neal, grandfather of Henry Mills and Hope, and great-grandfather of Lucy Mills. In the Enchanted Forest, he falls in love with Snow White and gets engaged to her. Hoping to reclaim their realm, David becomes the leader of a war council. After winning the war, he marries Snow. After the curse is cast, he initially becomes a comatose John Doe, and is later to be revealed as David Nolan. After the curse breaks, he is reunited with his daughter Emma, and the rest of his family. With magic brought to Storybrooke, David and the other heroes protect their town from various dark forces; among them are Cora, the Wicked Witch of the West, the Snow Queen, the Queens of Darkness, and the Black Fairy. After the creation of the United Realms, he, alongside Snow, crowns Regina the Good Queen of their newly formed realm.

=== Henry Mills ===
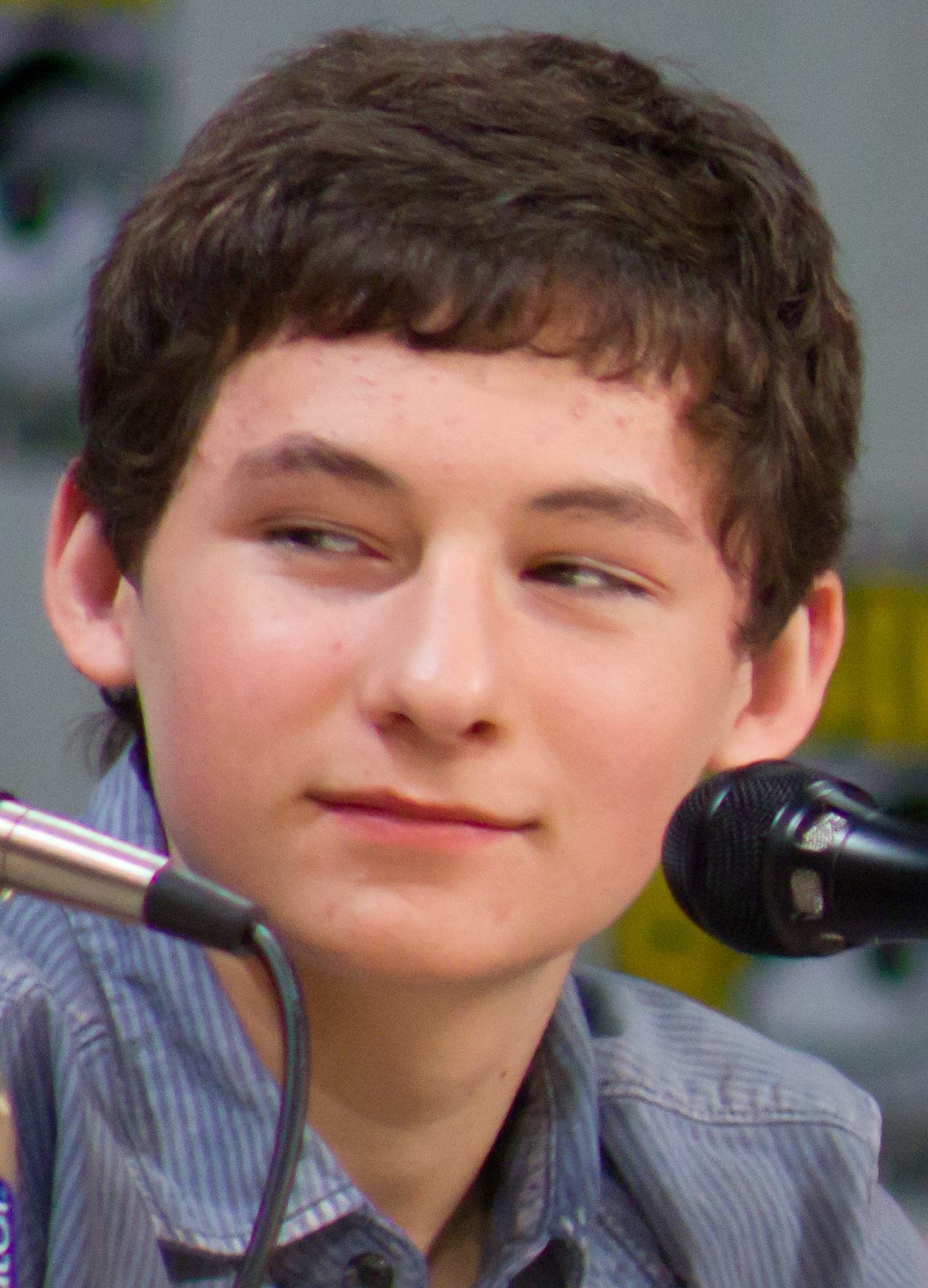
Jared S. Gilmore

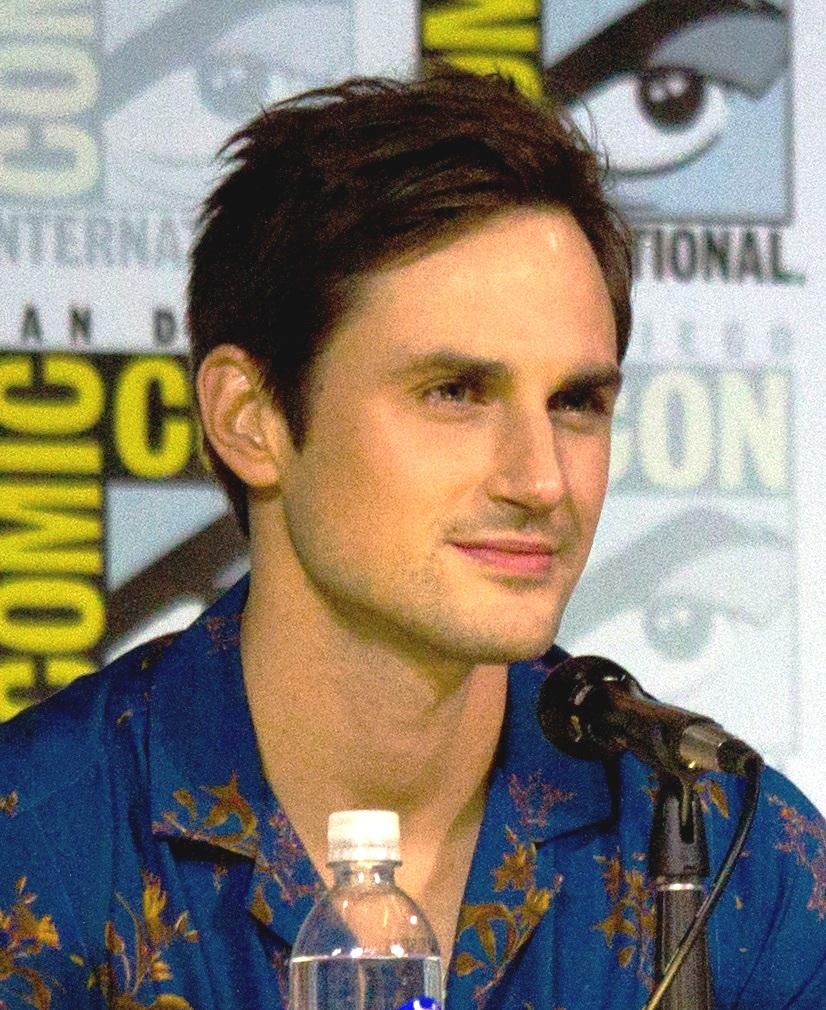
Andrew J. West

Henry Daniel Mills (seasons 1–7), portrayed by Jared S. Gilmore and Andrew J. West (season 7), is the biological son of Emma Swan and Neal Cassidy, and adopted son of Regina Mills. Via his extended family tree, he is also the step-son of Killian Jones, the older half-brother of Hope, husband of Ella, father of Lucy, nephew of Prince Neal Nolan, Gideon and Zelena, grandson of Snow White, Prince David, Cora Mills, Prince Henry, Rumplestiltskin and Milah, step-grandson of Belle, and great-grandson of King Leopold, Queen Eva, Regina, King Xavier, Ruth, Robert, Malcolm / Peter Pan, and Fiona / Black Fairy. As a child, he is given up for adoption by his birth mother Emma, and adopted a few weeks later by Regina, mayor of Storybrooke. Ten years later, he brings Emma to Storybrooke as he believes the town inhabitants are fairy tale characters cursed by Regina. Emma's true love for him breaks the curse and he is reunited with his family. He is later abducted by his own great-grandfather, Peter Pan, to Neverland because his own special heart would give immortality to Pan himself. He is later chosen as the new Author. After his high school graduation, Henry decides to find his own story in another realm and writes a new Once Upon a Time book. Eventually reaching New Fairy Tale Land, he falls in love with Ella and becomes the father to Lucy. After a new curse is cast, Henry ends up in Hyperion Heights, separated from his wife and daughter, unable to remember who they are. Once he breaks the curse via motherly love for Regina he is reunited with his family. After Regina merges all the realms, he attends her coronation with his family.

=== Jiminy Cricket ===
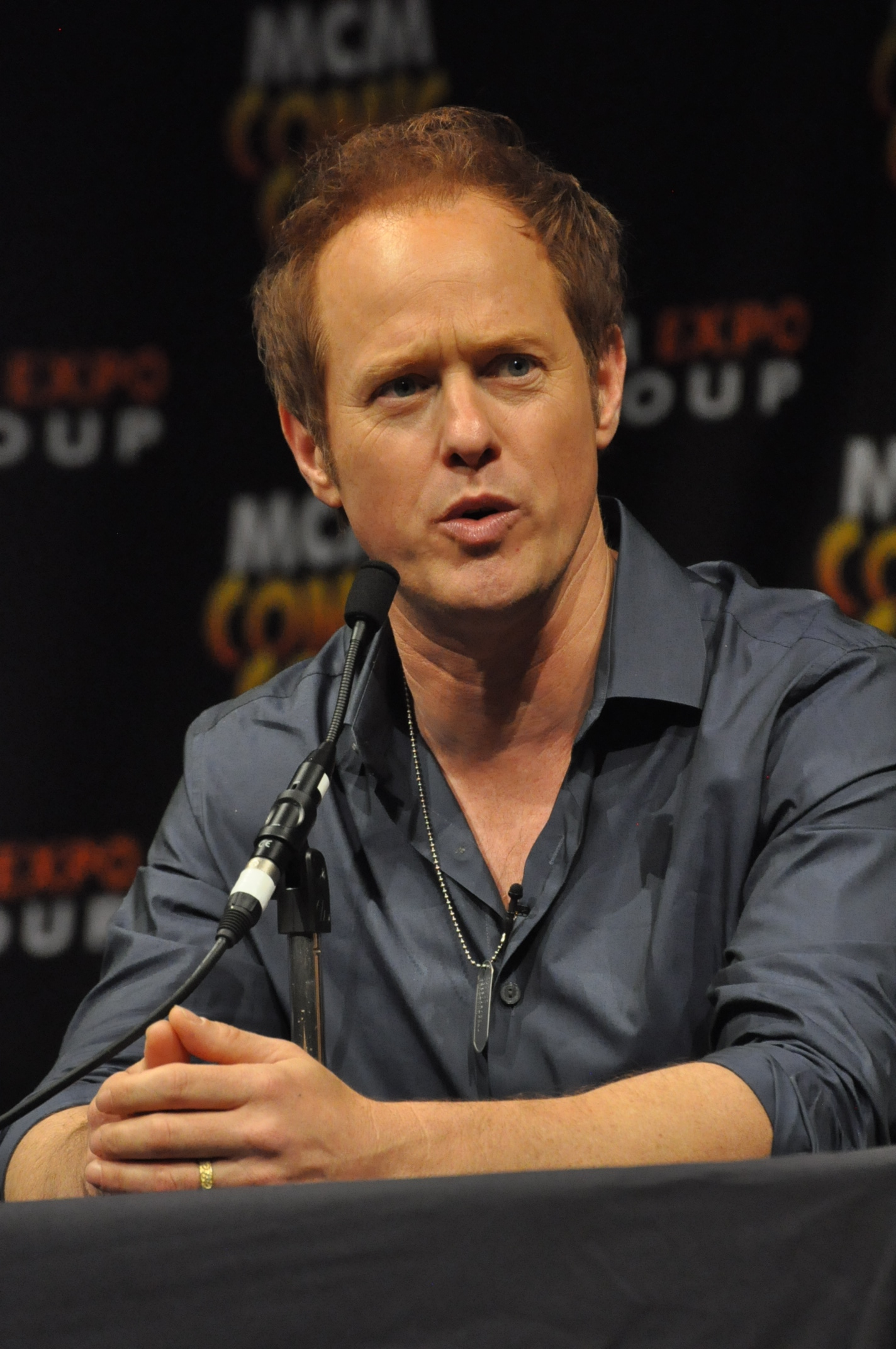
Raphael Sbarge

Jiminy Cricket/Dr. Archibald Hopper (seasons 1–4, 6–7), portrayed by Raphael Sbarge (adult) and Adam Young (young), is the son of con artists who desires to live an honest life but is too weak-willed to leave his family. In the Enchanted Forest, after accidentally turning a couple into puppets, Jiminy gains the help of the Blue Fairy to make amends with the couple's son, Geppetto. The Blue Fairy turns him into a cricket and he serves as Geppetto's conscience. After the curse is cast, he becomes Dr. Archibald Hopper, Storybrooke's psychotherapist. He also owns a dalmatian dog named Pongo. After the curse breaks, he is reunited with his former friends. He later officiates Emma and Killian's wedding.

=== The Huntsman ===
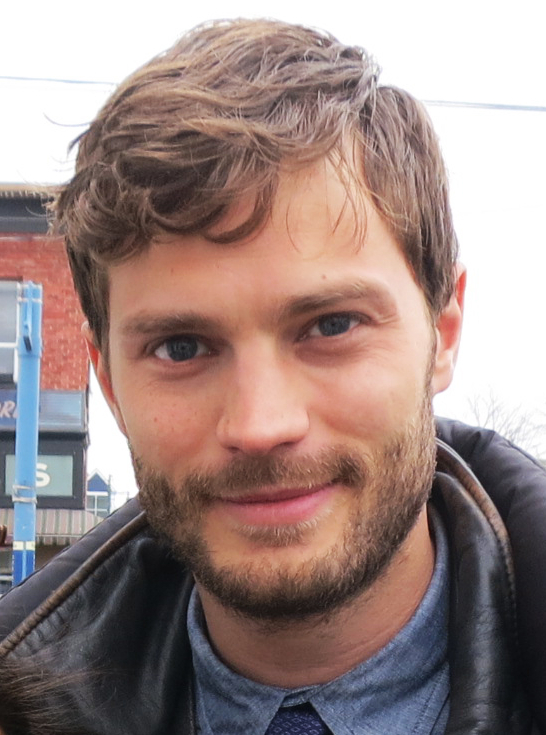
Jamie Dornan

The Huntsman/Sheriff Graham Humbert (seasons 1–2), portrayed by Jamie Dornan, is a nameless hunter who is a solitary recluse. In the Enchanted Forest, he is raised by wolves. He is recruited by the Evil Queen to kill Snow White. However, he has a change of heart and spares her, angering the Evil Queen who rips his heart and keeps it in her vault. He then becomes one of her Black Knights as punishment. He is transported to Storybrooke by the Evil Queen's curse where he is Sheriff Graham Humbert, the town's sheriff. He was also involved in numerous flings with Madame Mayor, Regina. However, after Emma Swan's arrival, he begins to remember his former life, but is killed by Regina before he could reveal it to Emma.

=== Rumplestiltskin ===
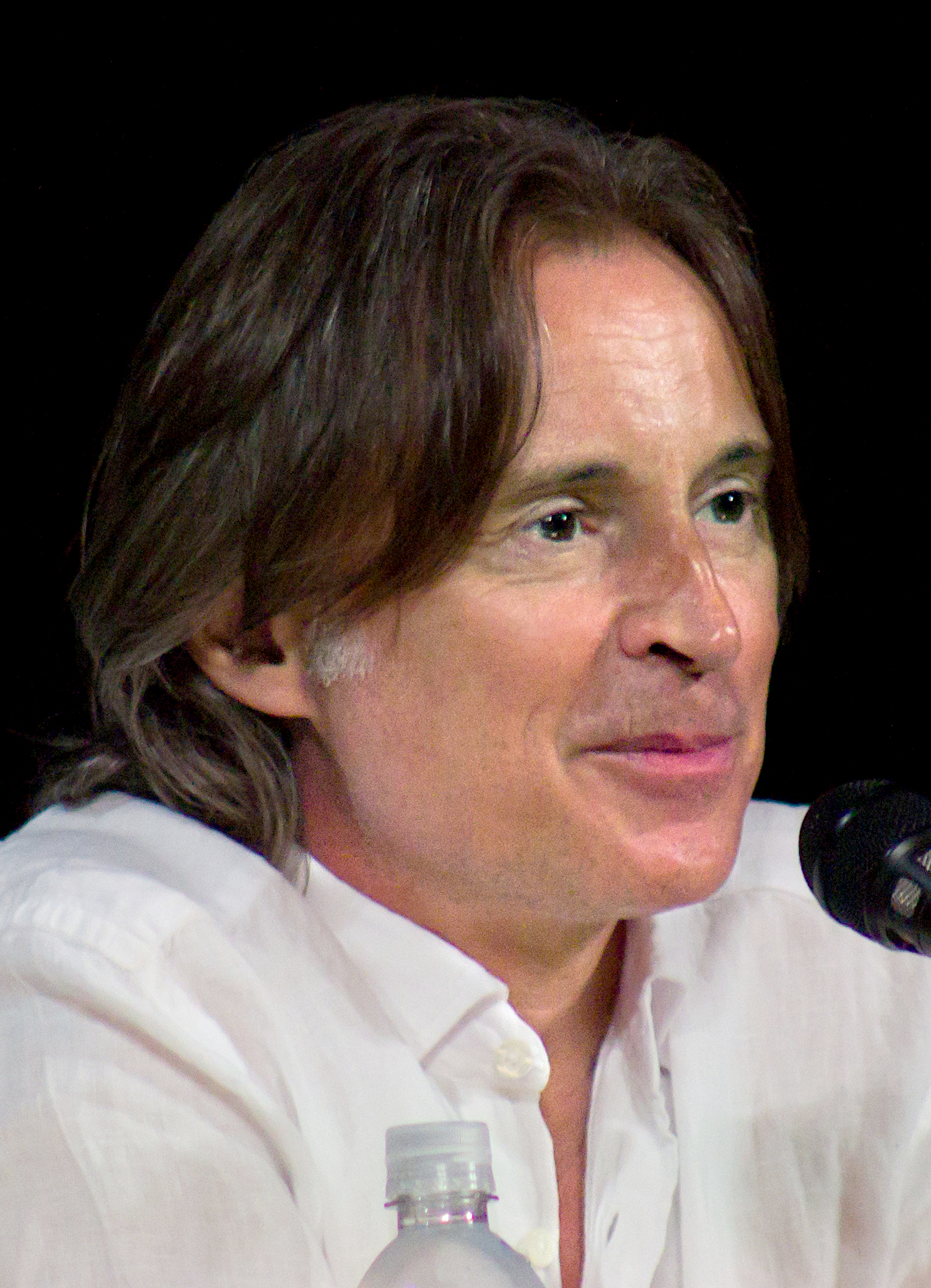
Robert Carlyle

Rumplestiltskin/Mr. Gold/Det. Weaver (seasons 1–7) also known as The Dark One, the Beast and the Crocodile, portrayed by Robert Carlyle (adult) and Wyatt Oleff (young), is the son of Malcolm / Peter Pan and Fiona / Black Fairy, a widower after first wife Milah, Belle's husband, Baelfire's and Gideon's father, Henry Mills' grandfather, and great-grandfather of Lucy Mills. His character is based on the German fairy tale Rumpelstiltskin, with elements imported from Beauty and the Beast and the tale of Peter Pan. He also takes the place of the fairy godmother from Cinderella.

He was originally a wool spinner who had deserted during the first ogre war. His wife left him for Killian "Hook" Jones, a pirate, because she was ashamed of Rumple's fame as a coward. In order to save his son Baelfire from the second ogre war, he became the Dark One, an immortal and almighty sorcerer who could only be controlled by a specific dagger — the tip piece of Excalibur — which had his name written on it. When Baelfire noticed that he was becoming more and more evil, he left Rumplestiltskin and jumped in a portal to The Land Without Magic. Then Rumple conceived a complex and ambitious plan to create a powerful curse to reach the same land himself.

A centuries-old creature, with virtually limitless powers and a deep knowledge of magic, Rumpelstiltskin is responsible for the majority of the events throughout the characters' histories, including Cora's quest for power, James becoming Prince Charming, Ingrid becoming "the Snow Queen", and teaming up "the Queens of Darkness" (Maleficent, Ursula, and Cruella). Most of all, he orchestrated Regina's transformation into the Evil Queen, which lead to her casting the Dark Curse. In Storybrooke, he became known as Mr. Gold, the richest man in the town.

After the Dark Curse was broken by Emma Swan, Rumple found Baelfire but he died because of "The Wicked Witch of The West". Because of his love for Belle, Rumplestiltskin would constantly battle between light and dark. Eventually, he settles down with Belle, with whom he has a second son, Gideon. After Belle dies of old age, Rumplestiltskin seeks the Guardian to rid himself of his Dark One powers. In a confrontation with his Wish Realm self, Rumplestiltskin sacrifices himself to save Hook and later reunites with Belle in the afterlife.

=== Pinocchio ===
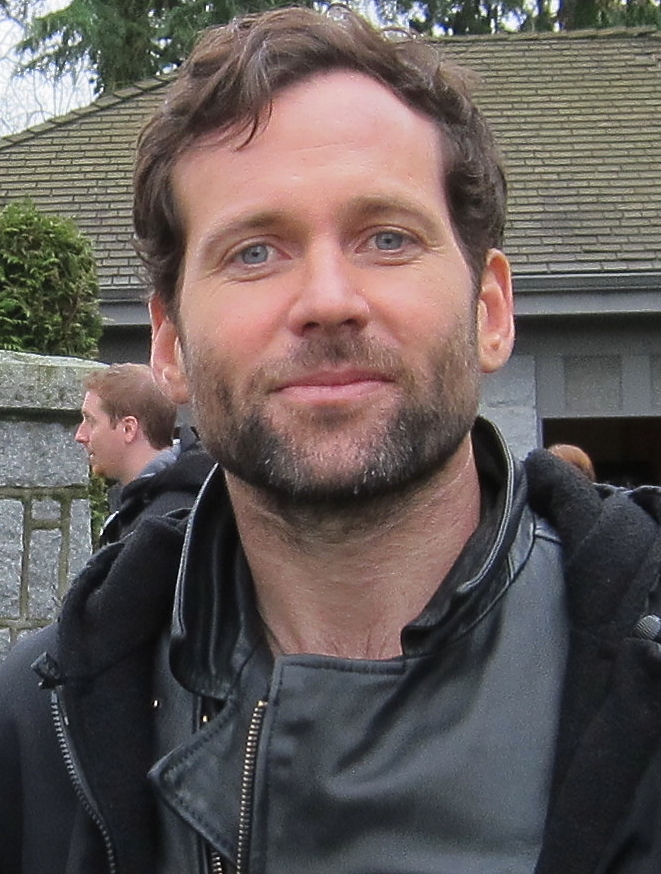
Eion Bailey

Pinocchio/August Wayne Booth (seasons 1–2, 4, 6–7), portrayed by Eion Bailey, Rustin Gresiuk, Jakob Davies, and Jack Davies, is a puppet that Geppetto carved from an enchanted tree. In the Enchanted Forest, as a boy, he gives his life to save Geppetto from drowning, though the Blue Fairy restores him into a real boy. After Geppetto makes a magical wardrobe to save Emma from the Evil Queen's curse, he sends Pinocchio in it along with her, sending them both to the Land Without Magic. After transporting, Pinocchio and Emma live in an orphanage until he runs away with other members of the home. Seventeen years later, Pinocchio, as August Wayne Booth, travels to Portland and confronts Neal Cassidy, a thief who has fallen in love with Emma. He convinces him to leave Emma to allow her to fulfill her destiny. August goes through several transformations during his time in Storybrooke, particularly during the hunt for the Author.

=== Belle French ===
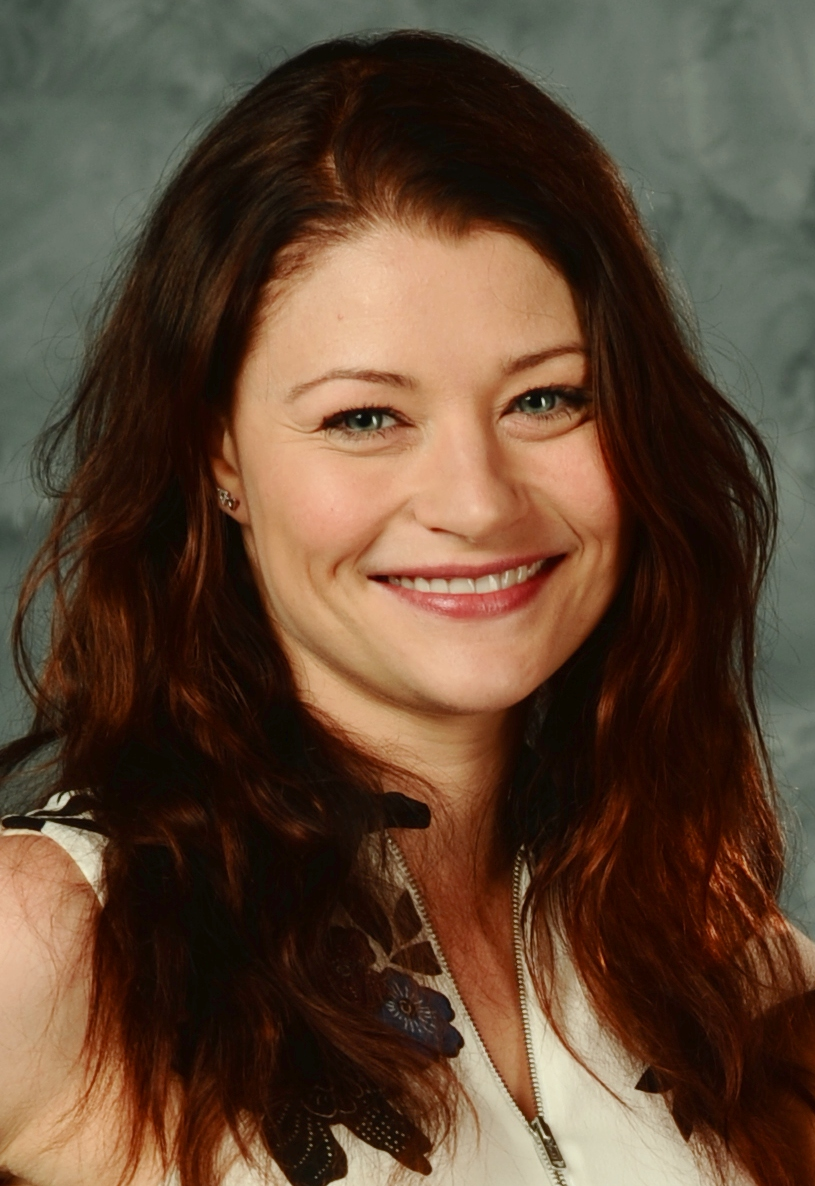
Emilie de Ravin

Belle French/Lacey (seasons 1–7), portrayed by Emilie de Ravin, is the daughter of Sir Maurice and Colette, second wife of Rumplestiltskin, mother of Gideon, step-mother of Baelfire, and step-grandmother of Henry Mills. Taken as a prisoner by Rumplestiltskin as part of a deal to save her kingdom from the Ogre War, Belle ends up falling in love with him. They share a True Love's Kiss, but he chooses to keep his curse, suspecting foul play. He orders her to leave, and she calls him a coward for not giving their love a chance. She is then captured and declared dead by the Evil Queen, and once the Dark Curse is cast, she becomes Lacey, a mental patient that remains in Regina's confinement in Storybrooke's General Hospital's mental ward beneath the town. Shortly before the curse was broken, Jefferson / Mad Hatter frees her and reunites her with Rumplestiltskin. Despite having an on-and-off relationship with Rumplestiltskin, Belle eventually marries him and gives birth to Gideon. As her dream is to travel, Rumplestiltskin takes her and their son to see the realms, where they eventually settle down at the Edge of Realms. Belle later dies of old age.

=== Killian Jones ===
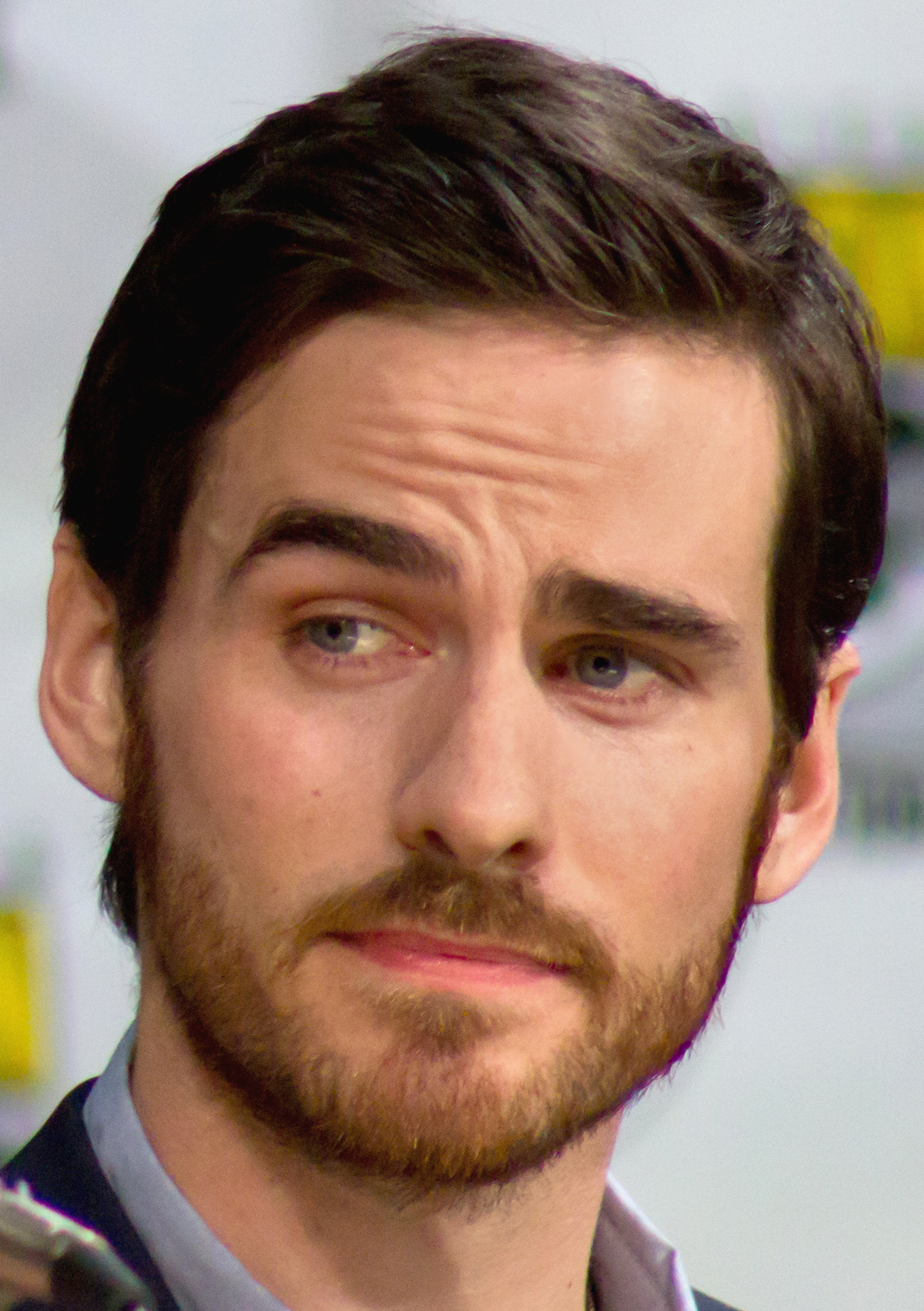
Colin O'Donoghue

Killian Jones/Hook (seasons 2–7), portrayed by Colin O'Donoghue (adult) and Oliver Bell (young), is the son of Brennan Jones, brother to Liam Jones, half brother to Liam, husband of Emma Swan, step-father of Henry Mills, and father of Hope Jones. Abandoned as a child, Killian and his brother end up with the navy, working for a king. However, after his brother's death, he chooses to rebel against the king and becomes a pirate. After falling in love with and stealing Rumplestiltskin's wife Milah, he loses his hand, earning the name "Hook.” Vowing vengeance against Rumplestiltskin, he spends two centuries in the Neverland and—after the Dark Curse was broken—he travels to Storybrooke with Cora. His vengeance is long forgotten after he falls in love with Emma Swan. They two eventually get married and have a daughter, Hope. During Regina's coronation after the merger of the realms, Hook, Emma, and Hope arrives late but are happily greeted by Regina. It is revealed that Hook is the murderer of David's father, Robert.

O'Donoghue also portrays Wish Realm Hook / Det. Rogers, an alternate version of Hook who escapes the Wish Realm and lives in the New Enchanted Forest, where he is deceived by Gothel, leading to the birth of Alice. Under the second curse, Hook becomes Det. Rogers in Hyperion Heights, working alongside Det. Weaver (Rumplestiltskin), and forming a father-daughter relationship with Tilly, later revealed to be Alice.

=== Red Lucas ===
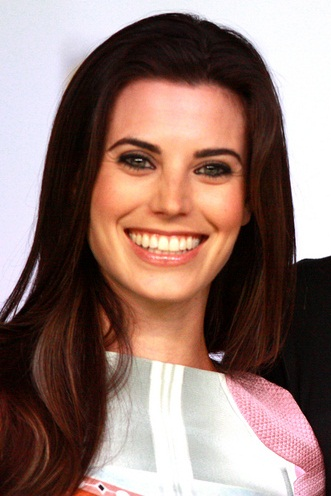
Meghan Ory

Red Lucas/Ruby (seasons 1–3, 5, 7, Wonderland), portrayed by Meghan Ory, is the daughter of Anita, granddaughter of Widow "Granny" Lucas, and Dorothy Gale's lover. Her plotline is mostly based on Little Red Riding Hood and werewolf myths, with references to the Russian folk tale Peter and the Wolf. In the Enchanted Forest, Red was a werewolf that had been terrorizing her village, which she wasn't aware of. She lived with her granny, who had gotten her an enchanted red cloak to prevent her transformation during the half-moon. Red discovered the truth when she unwillingly devoured her boyfriend, Peter, whom she believed was the wolf. Red then starts a life on the run and becomes close friends with Snow White. She is transported to Storybrooke when the Evil Queen casts her curse.

In Storybrooke, Red becomes Ruby, a rebellious yet insecure and loving young woman who wants to leave town but is held back by her grandmother's ill health and works at Granny's Diner as a waitress. Once the curse breaks, after "The Wicked Witch" was defeated, Ruby returned to Fairy Tale Land, where she eventually finds her way to the Land of Oz and begins a romantic relationship with Dorothy Gale.

=== Neal Cassidy ===
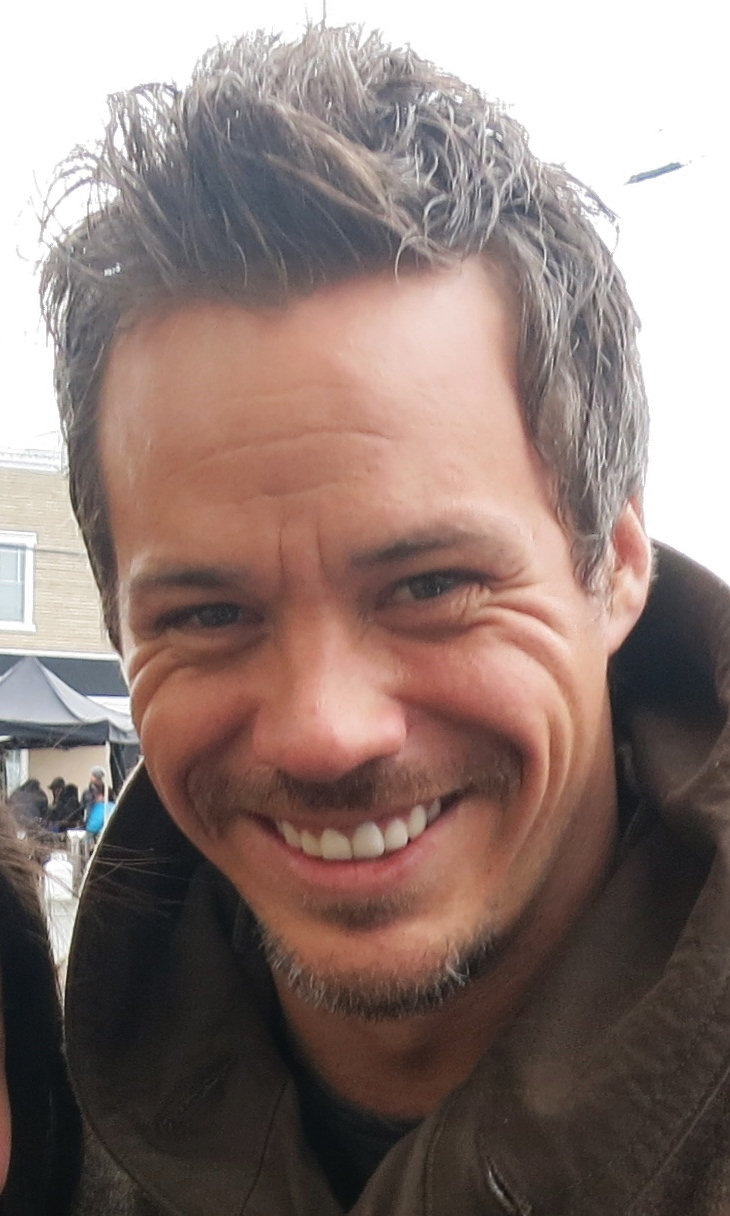
Michael Raymond-James

Baelfire/Neal Cassidy (seasons 1–3, 5–6), portrayed by Michael Raymond-James, Dylan Schmid, Brandon Spink, Sebastian Wilkinson, and Dean Petriw, is the son of Rumplestiltskin and Milah, step-son of Belle, half-brother of Gideon, grandson of Malcolm / Peter Pan and Fiona / Black Fairy, Emma Swan's first love, Henry Mills' father, Lucy Mills' grandfather, and Emma's brother's namesake. As a child, Baelfire lives with his father after his unhappy mother Milah left them. Saved by Rumple from war with ogres, Baelfire falls out with his father over his turn as the Dark One and was abandoned by his father to the Land Without Magic, where he adopts the alias Neal Cassidy. He meets 16-year-old Emma Swan while also unintentionally crossing paths with Pinocchio, who now goes by August Wayne Booth. August convinces Neal to breakup with Emma in order to put her on the path to break the Dark Curse. Eventually, Neal engages Tamara, but the relationship never develops. Ten years later, Neal reunites with his father and discovers that he has a son, Henry. After Hook attacks Rumple in New York, the group, along with Neal, returns to Storybrooke. Neal fought with his great-grandfather in Neverland to get Henry back. Returning to the Enchanted Forest via a reversal of the curse, he sacrifices himself against Zelena to bring back his father and becomes conjoined with him. Following a new curse, Emma separates Neal from his father, allowing him to die. He briefly visits Emma in the Dreamscape to warn her about the Underworld and its dangers.

=== Will Scarlet ===
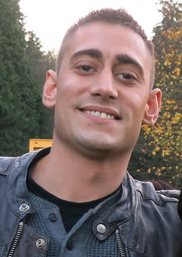
Michael Socha

Will Scarlet/Knave of Hearts/White King (season 4, Wonderland), portrayed by Michael Socha, is the brother of Penelope and lover of Anastasia. He witnesses the death of his sister, Penelope. in Oz, he wanted to get a potion that heals broken hearts and met Robin Hood. He then moves to the Enchanted Forest and falls in love with Anastasia. Together, they escape to Wonderland for a better life, but Anastasia betrays him to become the Red Queen. Heartbroken, Will gives his heart to Cora, becoming her Knave of Hearts. With Alice's help, Will eventually regains his heart. After the Dark Curse is cast, Will was sent to the Land Without Magic. In Storybrooke, Will is sought by the White Rabbit after the curse breaks and is brought back to Wonderland with Alice to help find Cyrus. After Will's heart is inserted back into his chest, he is able to feel love again. After Jafar's defeat, he reunites with Anastasia and rules alongside her as the White King of Wonderland.

=== Zelena ===
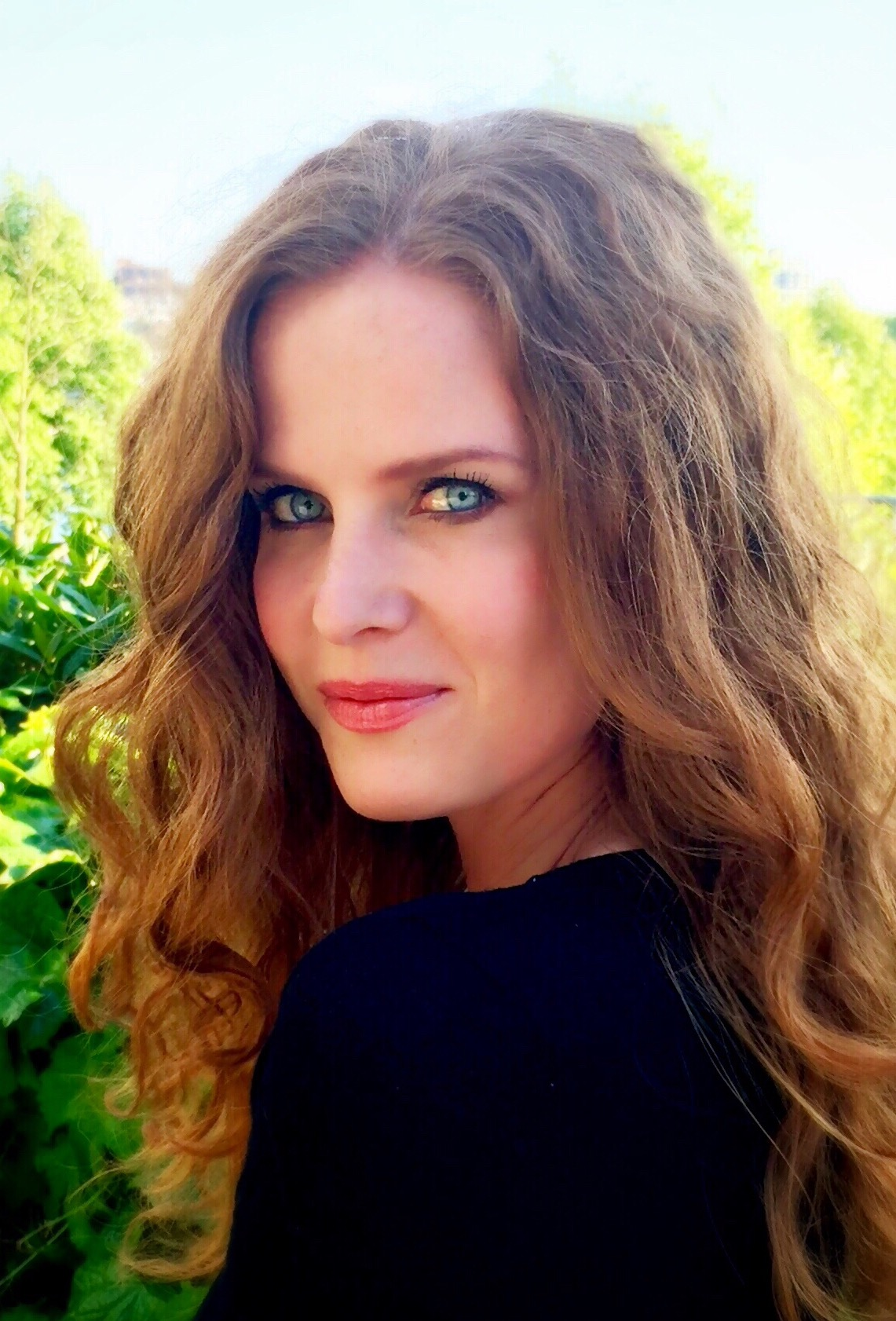
Rebecca Mader

Zelena/Wicked Witch of the West/Kelly West (seasons 3–7), portrayed by Rebecca Mader (adult) and Isabella Blake-Thomas (young), is the older daughter of Cora Mills and a gardener, Jonathan, half-sister of Regina "The Evil Queen" Mills, mother of Robin, and Chad's fiancée. Abandoned as a child, Zelena wishes for family love but grows envious of her half-sister Regina for getting everything she ever wanted. After she was trained by Rumplestiltskin, in hopes of changing her past, Zelena collects ingredients to activate a time portal, although her plans were thwarted. Zelena later chooses to mend her sisterly bond with Regina after the birth of her daughter Robin. After a new curse is cast, Zelena becomes Kelly West and is engaged to Chad, but regains her memories from Regina. After the United Realms is created, Zelena chooses to remain with Chad.

=== Robin Hood ===
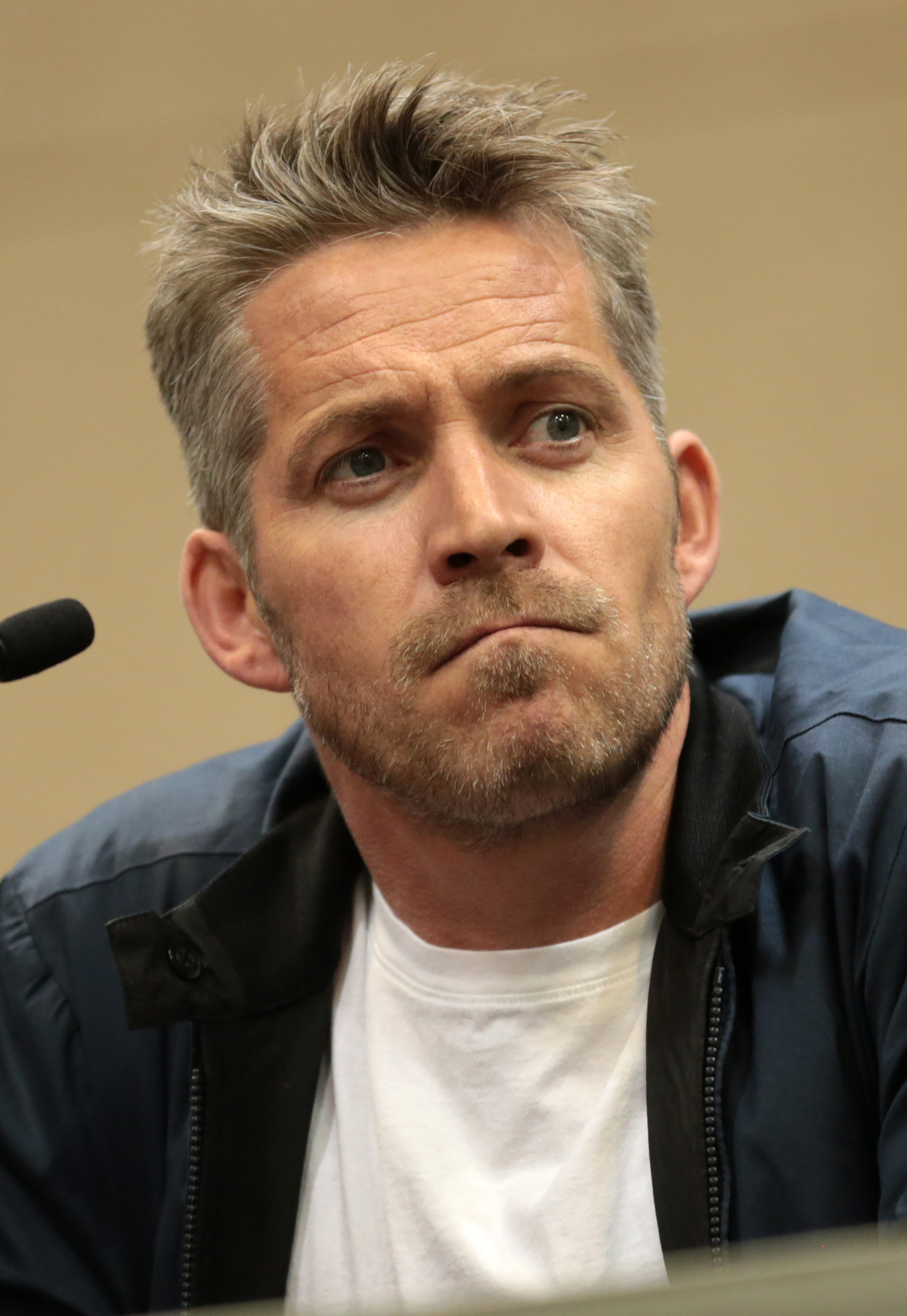
Sean Maguire

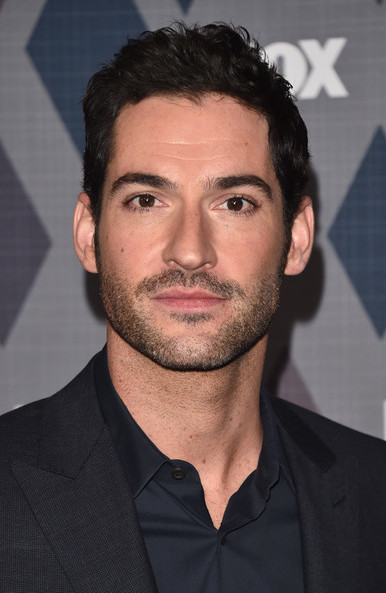
Tom Ellis

Robin of Locksley/Robin Hood (seasons 2–7, Wonderland), portrayed by Tom Ellis in the second season and Sean Maguire in subsequent seasons, is the widower of Marian, father of their son Roland, and father of his and Zelena's daughter Robin. Second true love of Regina "The Evil Queen". Robbing from the rich for the poor, Robin ends up with Marian because of his honor code, but his actions angers the Sheriff of Nottingham, who threatens to close down Robin's bar, prompting him to make a deal with Rumplestiltskin. Over the years, he gains a son, but loses Marian, but eventually finds a new love: Regina. However, he dies protecting Regina from Hades via annihilation from the Olympian Crystal.

=== Ella ===
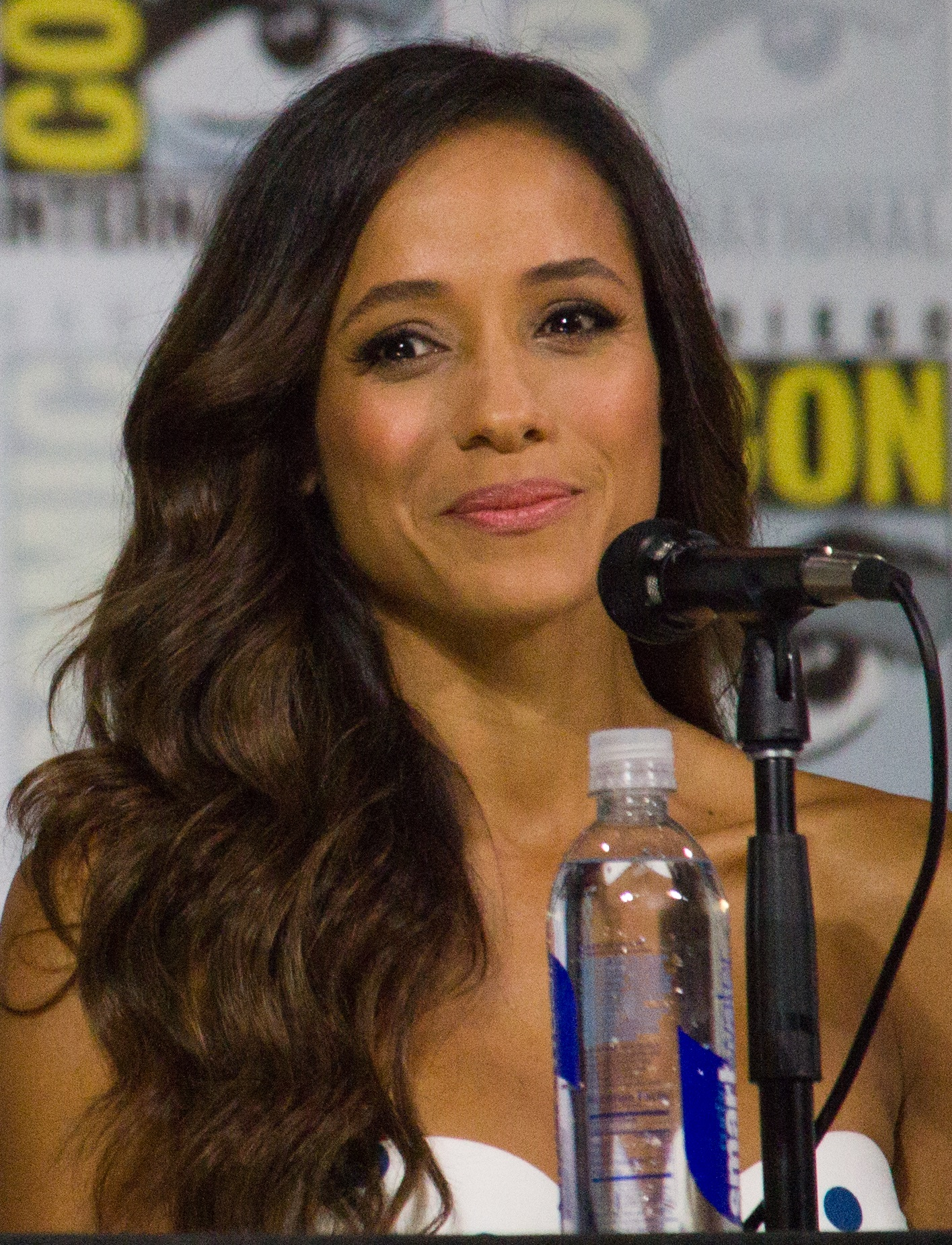
Dania Ramirez

Ella/Jacinda Vidrio (season 7), portrayed by Dania Ramirez (adult) and Alejandra Pérez (young), is the daughter of Cecelia, step-daughter of Marcus Tremaine and Rapunzel Tremaine, step-sister of Anastasia and Drizella (Clorinda and Tisbe in Season 6), wife of Henry Mills, and mother of Lucy Mills. As a child, her mother remarries and she gains a step-family. However, after the return of her step-father's first wife: Rapunzel, the family relations become complicated, as Rapunzel becomes jealous of the new family. Once both her mother and stepfather was eliminated, Ella ends up as a maid. Years later, she falls in love with Henry Mills and gives birth to Lucy. However, after the Dark Curse is cast, Ella is sent to the Land Without Magic but is reunited with her family after the curse breaks. She later attends Regina's coronation once the realms had been merged.

=== Rapunzel Tremaine ===
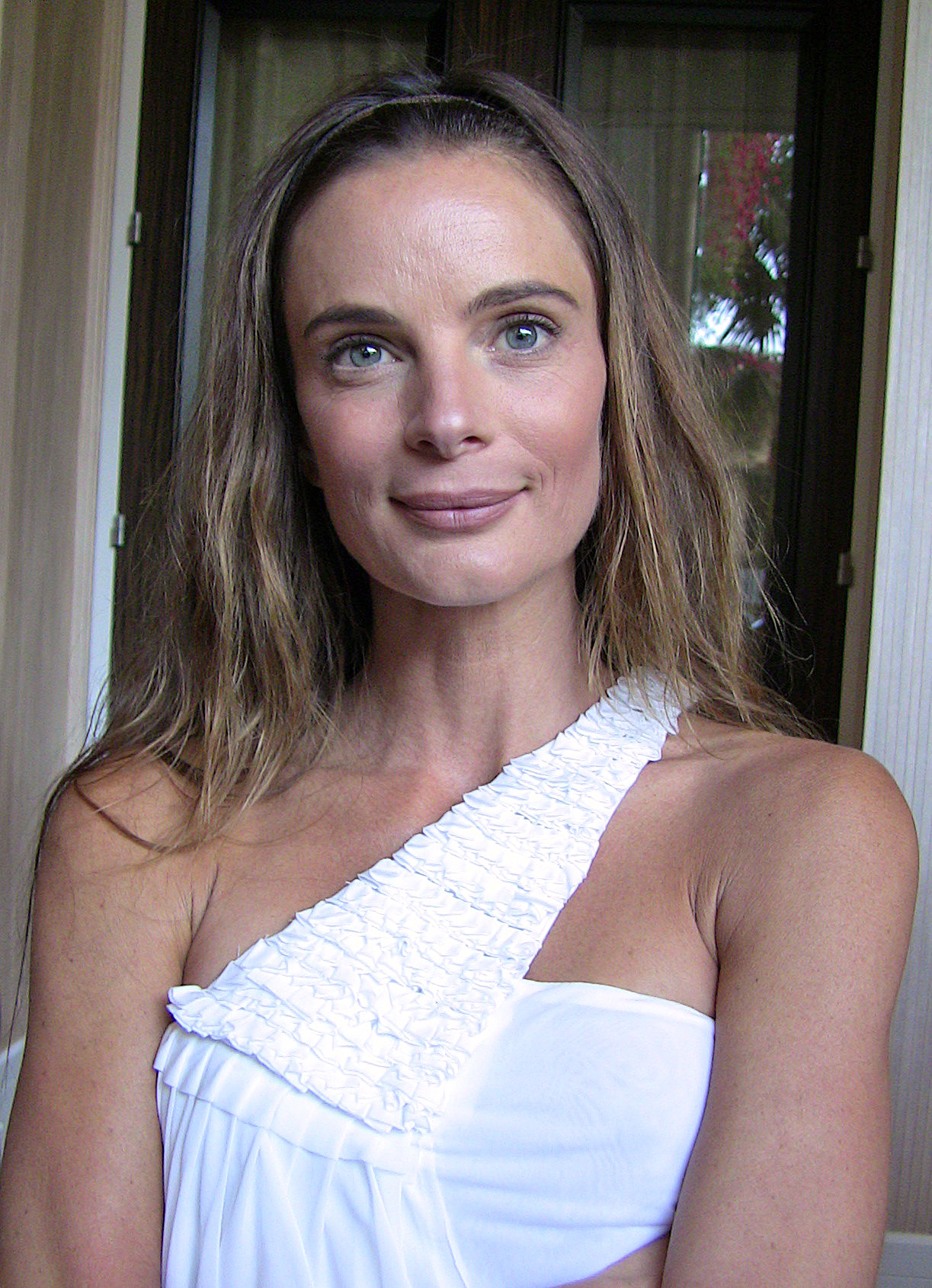
Gabrielle Anwar

Rapunzel Tremaine/Victoria Belfrey (season 7), portrayed by Gabrielle Anwar and Meegan Warner, is the first wife of Marcus Tremaine, mother of Anastasia and Drizella, step-mother of Ella, step-mother-in-law of Henry, and step-grandmother of Lucy Mills. In order to save her family, Rapunzel makes a deal with Mother Gothel and ends up locked away in a tower for six years. After freeing herself, she learns that her husband had remarried with a family of his own. Desperate to reunite herself with her family, she curses Cecelia. However, after Anastasia's apparent death, Rapunzel decides to kill Marcus and takes over the manor. She treats Drizella and Ella cruelly, prompting Drizella to conspire with Gothel to cast the Dark Curse which sends Rapunzel to the Land Without Magic. In Hyperion Heights, Rapunzel becomes Victoria Belfrey. Remembering her past life, she has Gothel locked away in her tower. After removing Lucy's belief, she awakens Anastasia. She sacrifices herself to save Ivy and trades her life for Lucy.

=== Lucy Mills ===
Lucy Mills/Lucy Vidrio (seasons 6–7), portrayed by Alison Fernandez, is the daughter of Ella and Henry Mills. Born in the New Enchanted Forest to Henry and Ella, Lucy is a catalyst in the curse's prophecy. Fearing for Lucy's life, Henry brings her deep into the forest with the intent to build a magical wardrobe that will send her to the new world, but she loses him when he battles a beast sent by the Coven of the Eight. After the Dark Curse is cast, Lucy is sent to the Land Without Magic. In Hyperion Heights, she is known as Lucy Vidrio and believes that most of its inhabitants are fairy tale characters. She brings Henry to Hyperion Heights and tries to make him believe in the curse. She eventually ends up in a coma after Victoria awakens Anastasia. Lucy is awakened when Victoria sacrifices herself to save her. When all the realms are merged, she joins her family for Regina's coronation.

=== Tiana ===
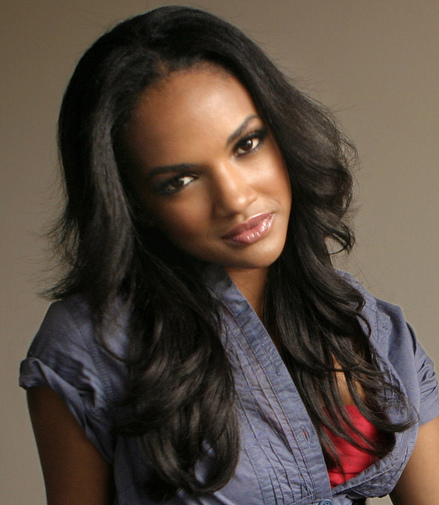
Mekia Cox

Queen Tiana/Sabine (season 7), portrayed by Mekia Cox, is the daughter of Queen Eudora and a king. Forced to auction her items, Princess Tiana seeks help from Dr. Facilier to find a Prince but finds out that it was a ruse, and decides to form a resistance against the King of the realm. As the resistance leader, she recruits Ella, Henry, Regina, and Hook to help their cause. During this time, she meets Prince Naveen but loses him to Dr. Facilier. Eventually, she becomes Queen of her kingdom when her mother steps down. When the Dark Curse is cast, Tiana is sent to the Land Without Magic. In Hyperion Heights, Tiana is known as Sabine. Her interest in making beignets causes her to open a food truck, unintentionally reuniting with Drew. After the merger of the realms, Tiana attends Regina's coronation to the Good Queen of the United Realms.

=== Alice ===
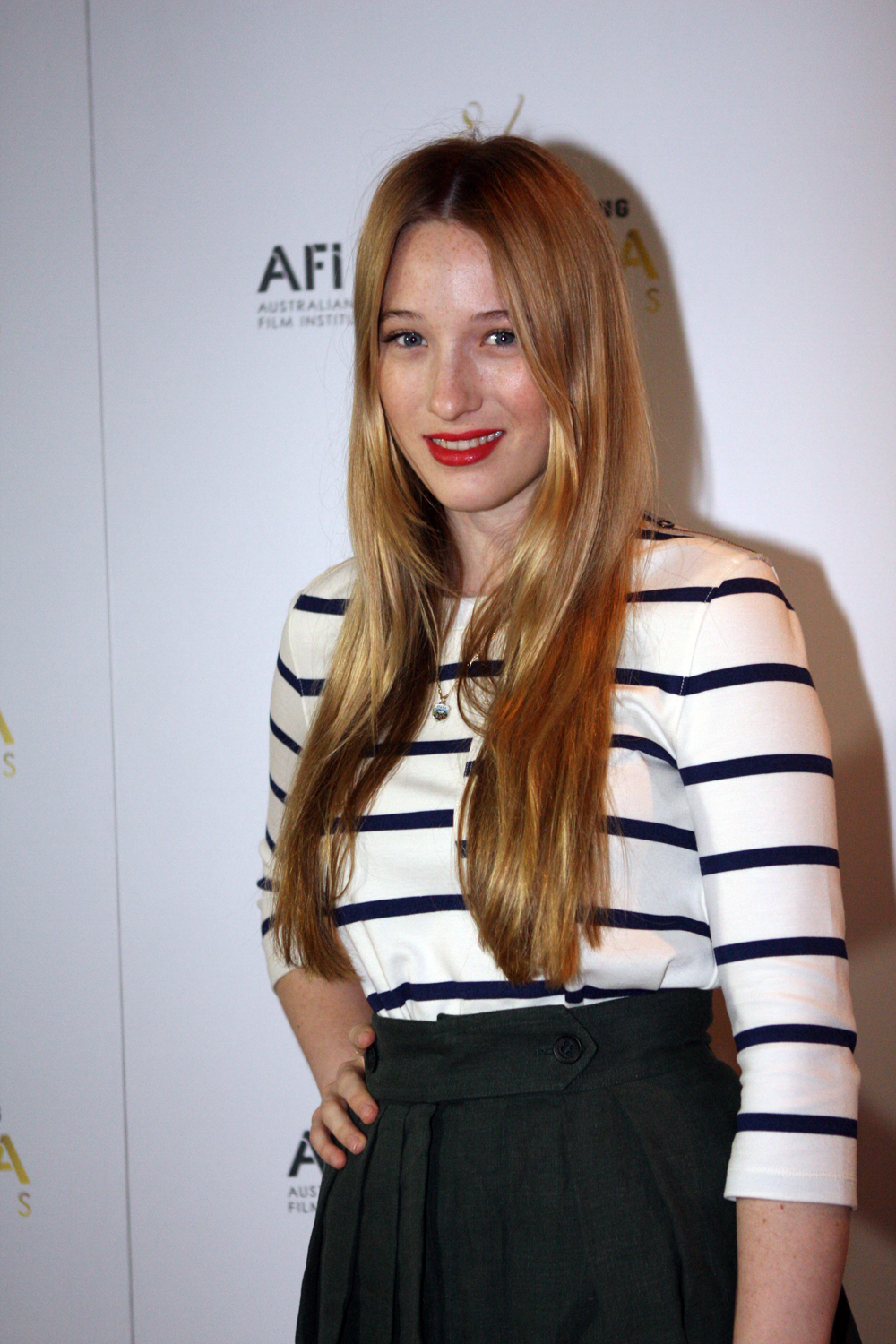
Sophie Lowe

Alice (Wonderland), portrayed by Sophie Lowe and Millie Bobby Brown, is the daughter of Edwin, stepdaughter of Sarah, half-sister of Millie, wife of Cyrus, and mother to her daughter. In Victorian England, Alice accidentally stumbles upon a rabbit hole that leads her to Wonderland, where she interacts with the White Rabbit, Cora, Anastasia, and Will Scarlet. She also finds a genie named Cyrus and falls for him. After his apparent death, Alice is sent back to Victorian England and locked away in an asylum for a delusional belief in Wonderland. Spending a year in the asylum, Alice is freed by Will and the White Rabbit and is taken to Wonderland to face off Jafar and Anastasia in a quest to rescue Cyrus. After Jafar is defeated, Alice and Cyrus return to Victorian England for their wedding. Alice then gives birth to a baby girl. Several years later, Alice tells her daughter of her adventures in Wonderland, naming the White King and Queen as the true rulers of Wonderland.

=== Cyrus ===
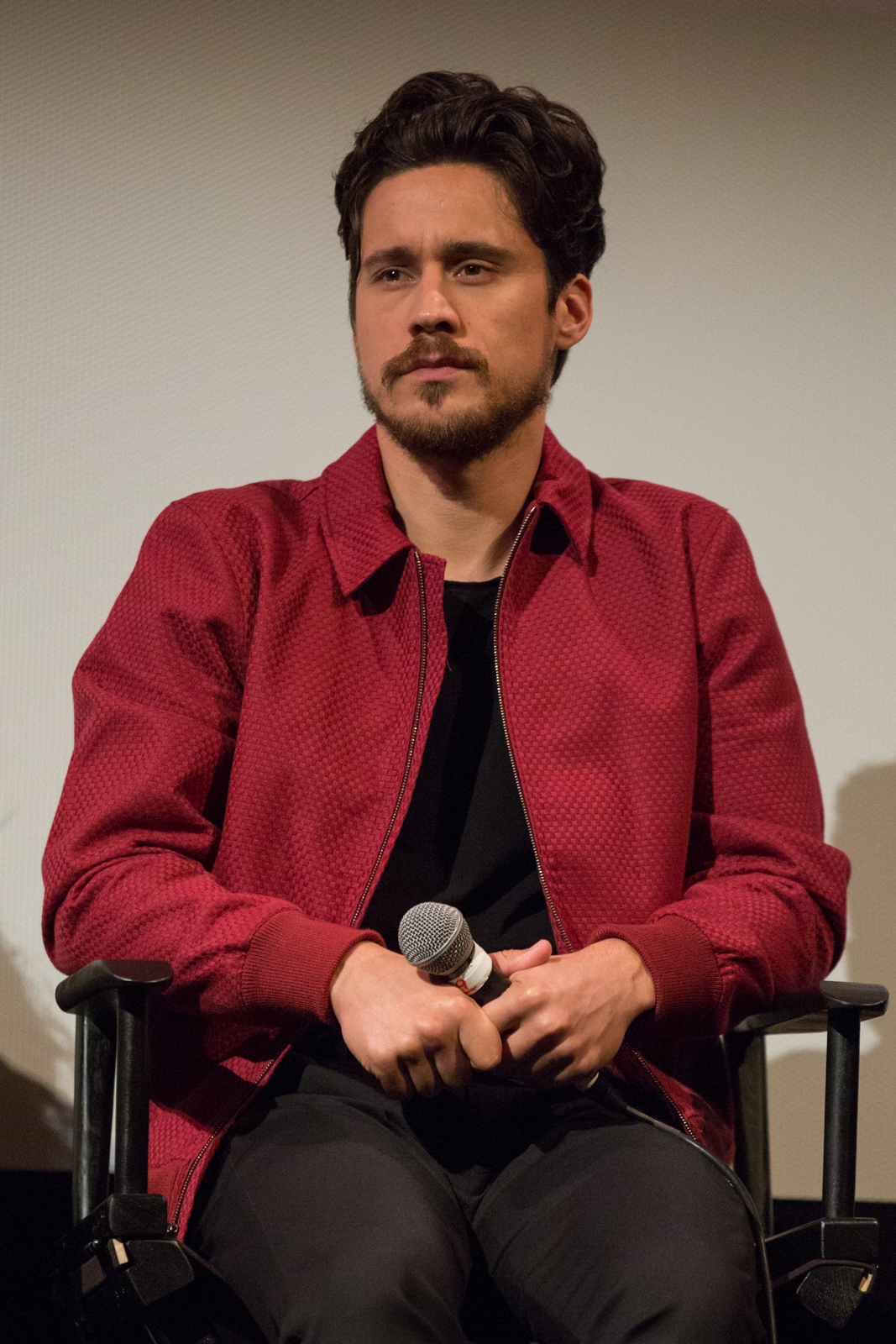
Peter Gadiot

Cyrus (Wonderland), portrayed by Peter Gadiot, is the son of Amara, brother to Taj and Rafi, lover of Alice and later father to her daughter. In Agrabah, Cyrus and his brothers are turned into genies after stealing magical waters from the Well of Wonders, and Cyrus' genie bottle eventually ends up in Wonderland. When Alice comes to Wonderland, he falls in love with her. He is then "killed" by the Red Queen and captured by Jafar. Twenty-eight years later, upon the revelation that Cyrus is alive, Alice is brought back to Wonderland and she rescues Cyrus. After Jafar's defeat, Cyrus goes to Victorian England to wed Alice. Years later, both Cyrus and Alice have a daughter as they tell their daughter about their adventures in Wonderland.

=== Anastasia ===
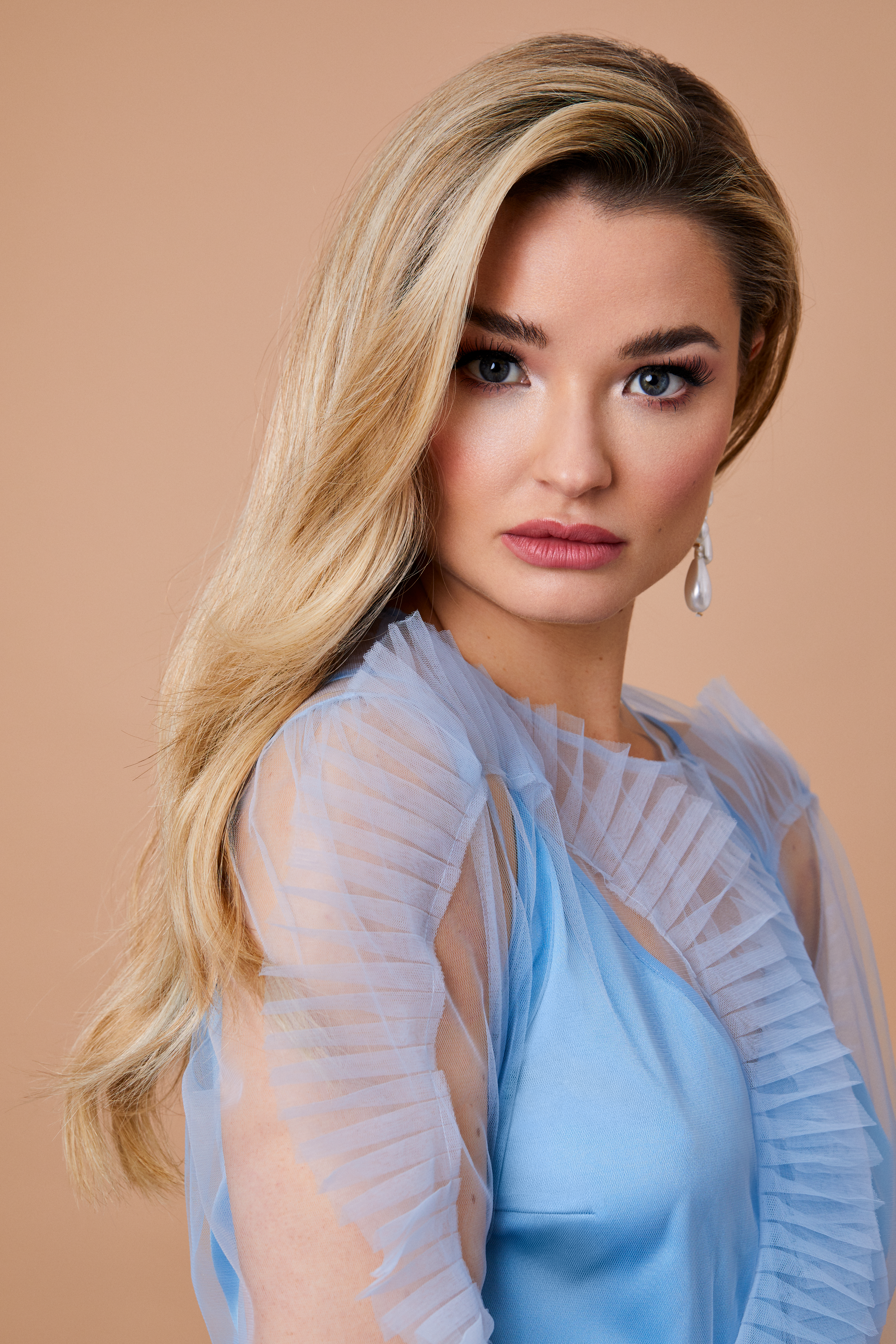
Emma Rigby

Anastasia/Red Queen/White Queen (Wonderland), portrayed by Emma Rigby, is the lover of Will Scarlet. In the Enchanted Forest, Anastasia meets Will Scarlet and falls in love with him. For a better life, she and Will escape to Wonderland, but she betrays him to become the Red Queen. As the Red Queen, she learns magic from Cora to ascend power over her realm. However, Anastasia eventually regrets her actions and wishes to reunite with Will, forming an alliance with Jafar to change the laws of magic. Using the White Rabbit, she gets Alice and Will back in Wonderland to gain Cyrus' genie bottle. However, her love for Will interrupts Jafar's plan, which shatters their alliance. She patches things with Will but is killed by Jafar and eventually resurrected after his defeat. She and Will are briefly separated by unknown means, but they eventually reunite and rule Wonderland as the White Queen and King.

=== Jafar ===
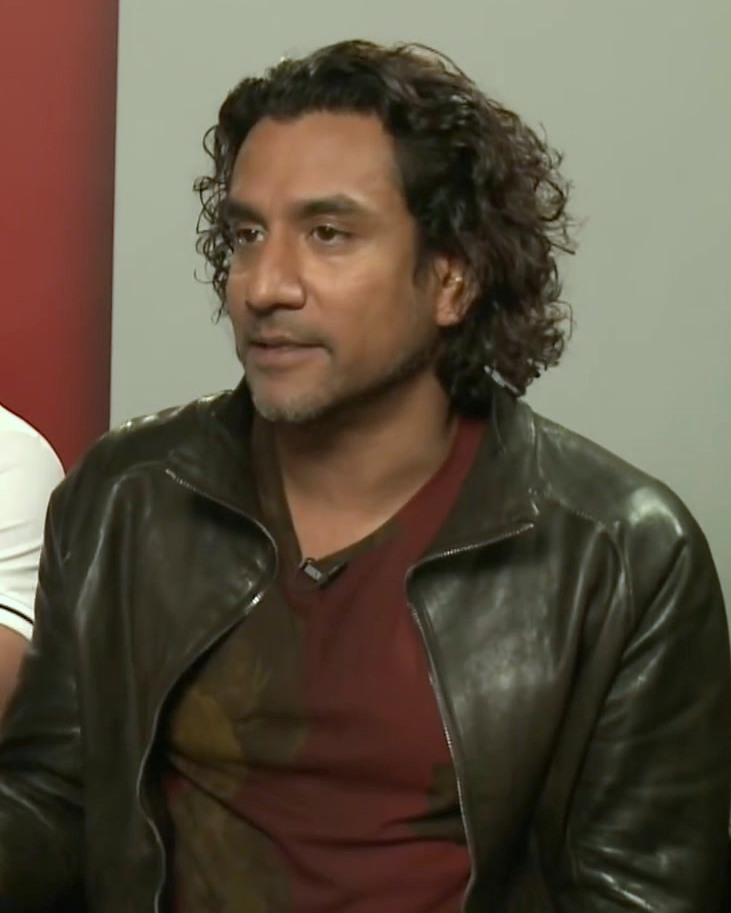
Naveen Andrews

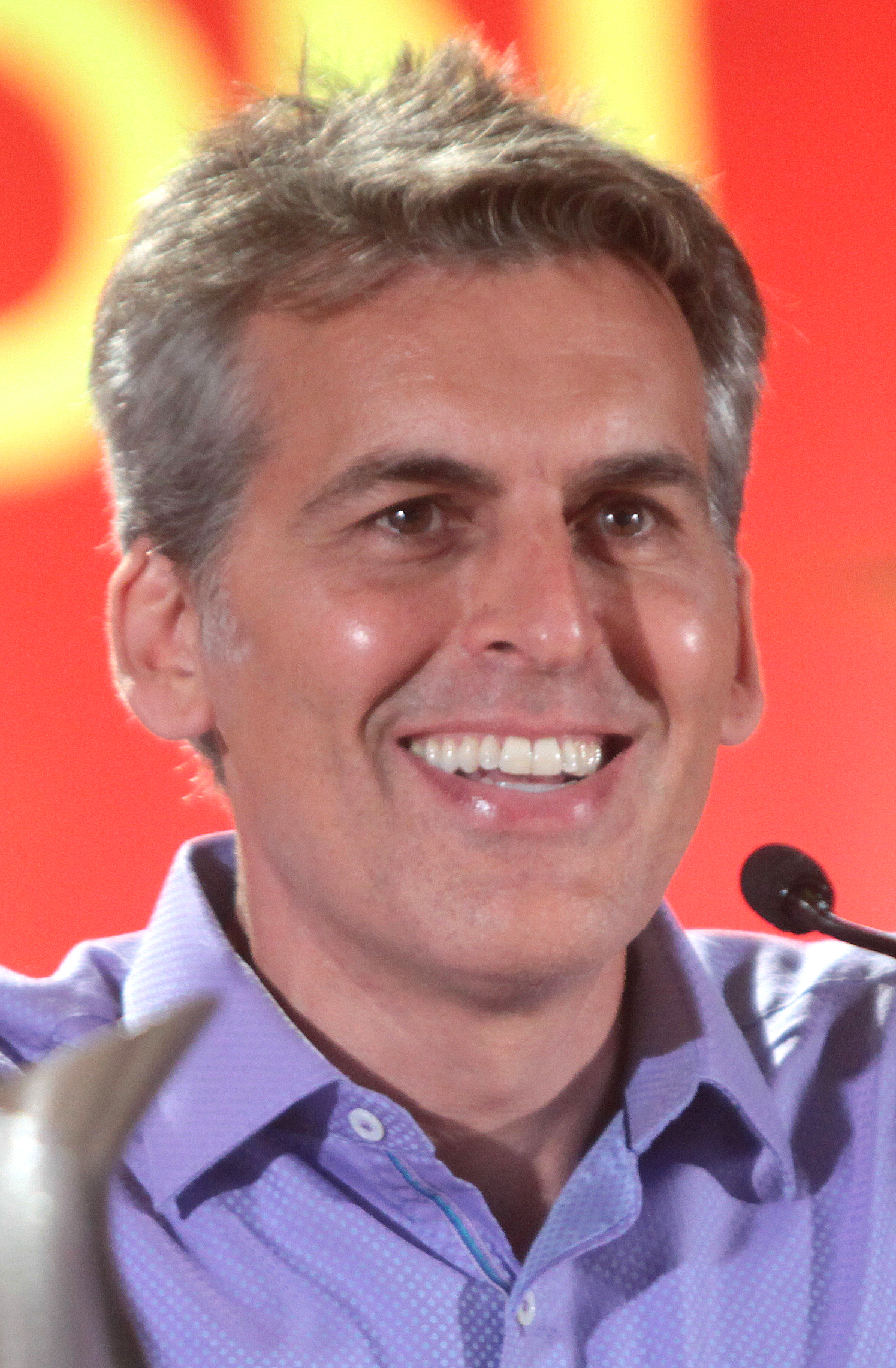
Oded Fehr

Jafar (season 6, Wonderland), portrayed by Naveen Andrews (Wonderland), Oded Fehr (season 6), and Anthony Keyvan (Wonderland; young), is the son of Ulima, the bastard son of the Sultan, and half-brother of Mirza. After his mother's death, Jafar wishes to be acknowledged as the son of the Sultan, but being the bastard son, the Sultan refuses. Hoping to use three genie lamps to change the laws of magic, he kidnaps the Sultan and makes an alliance with the Red Queen of Wonderland, but betrays her once their goals no longer aligned. Using any means necessary to gain all three genies, Jafar, along with Amara becomes the most powerful sorcerer in all the realms, but his wrongdoing is undone by Nyx when he unintentionally steals the magical waters of the Well of Wonders, and he is turned into a genie and is sent to the Enchanted Forest. Discovered by Princess Jasmine in his genie form, he is killed via transformation to a staff.

=== Percy ===
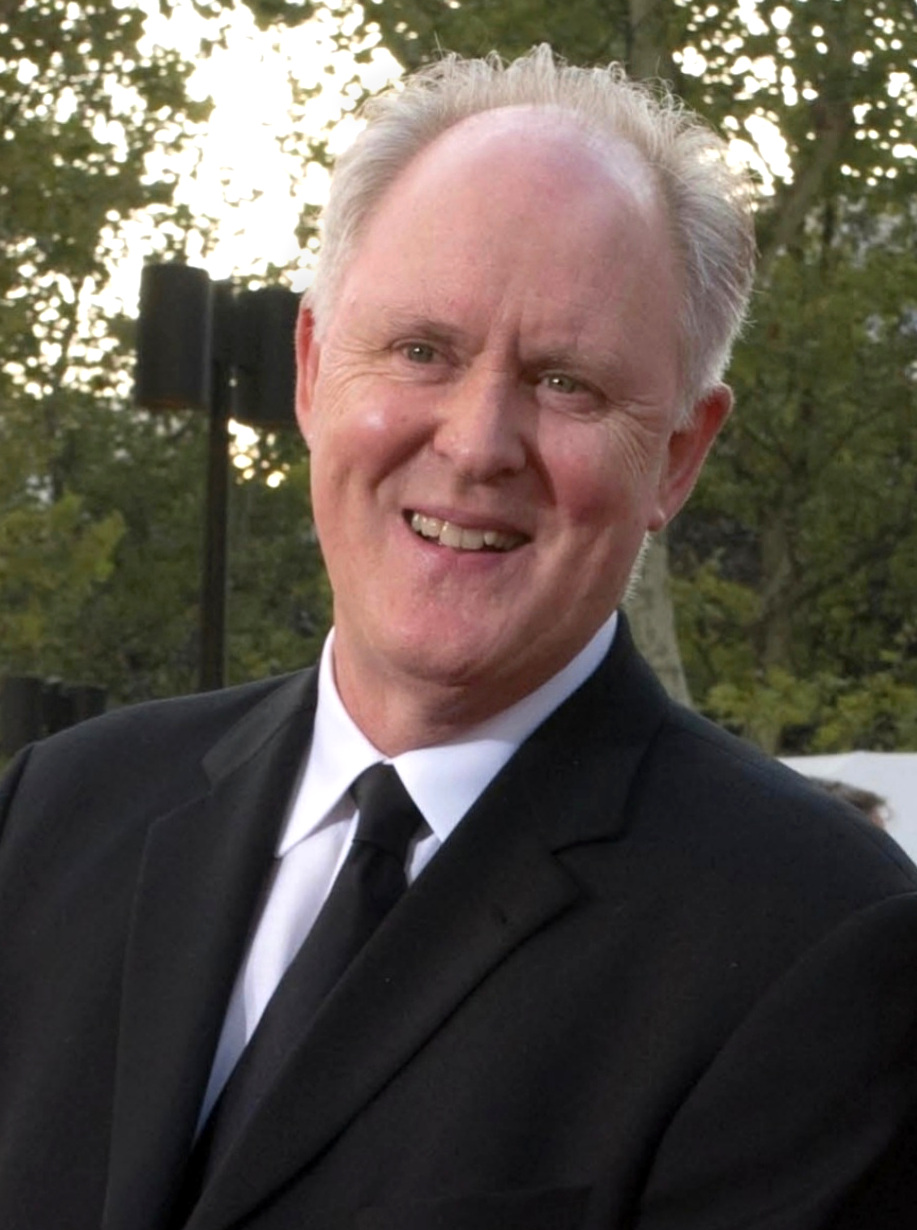
John Lithgow

Percy/White Rabbit (Wonderland), voiced by John Lithgow, is the husband of Mrs. Rabbit, and father of his son and daughter. As the White Rabbit of Wonderland, Percy is able to create rabbit-hole portals to any realm. During his time in Victorian England, Alice follows Percy through a rabbit hole to Wonderland. Twenty-eight years later, he retrieves the Knave of Hearts from Storybrooke and help rescue Alice from an asylum, bringing them both to Wonderland to help find Cyrus. To defeat Jafar, he recruits an army to defeat Jafar's undead army. Following Jafar's defeat, he opens a portal for Alice, Cyrus and many of their Wonderland friends to Victorian England for preparation of Alice and Cyrus' wedding. After the wedding, he sends his family, Anastasia, and Will back to Wonderland. Years later, he can be seen looking from behind some tall grasses when Alice and Cyrus are seen with their child.

== Recurring cast ==
- Dreamy/Grumpy/Leroy (seasons 1–7, Wonderland) portrayed by Lee Arenberg, is a dwarf and mine digger. Born in the mines after his egg was accidentally sprinkled with fairy dust by the fairy Nova, he falls in love with her. The Blue Fairy tells Dreamy that if he and Nova run away together, she will lose her wings. Dreamy ends their relationship and returns to the mines, being renamed Grumpy. He then becomes friends with Snow White while she's on a run from the Evil Queen, inviting her to stay at the Dwarfs cottage. Together with the other dwarves, he helps Snow defeat King George and the Evil Queen, taking back the realm. He later ends up in Storybrooke – after the Dark Curse is cast – as a janitor at the Storybrooke General Hospital and the town drunk. He remains in Storybrooke for the subsequent curses until the merger of all the realms.
- Widow Lucas/Granny (seasons 1–7) portrayed by Beverley Elliott, is the mother of Anita and grandmother of Red Lucas. In the Enchanted Forest, a wolf killed her father and brothers and then transformed her into a wolf. Most aspects of the curse faded with age, but her heightened senses remain. Red inherited the curse, though Granny received an enchanted red cloak to prevent her transformation. When her granddaughter begins a relationship with a man called Peter, she disapproves. As news of a wolf killing villagers becomes known, Granny warns the others not to fight the monster. In Storybrooke, she is the owner of Granny's Bed and breakfast and Diner. Her health problems prevent Ruby from leaving town, who assists her grandmother as a waitress. Granny's memories are returned when the curse is broken and is then sent back to the Enchanted Forest when the curse is undone by Regina. When Snow White cast a new curse, Granny is brought back to Storybrooke, resuming her role as the owner of her Bed and Breakfast and Diner. She remains in Storybrooke for the subsequent curses until the merger of all the realms.
- Reul Ghorm/Blue Fairy/Mother Superior (seasons 1–7) portrayed by Keegan Connor Tracy, is a high-ranking fairy godmother who uses her magic to help others. In the Enchanted Forest, she is the leader of the fairies and sets the rules among her kind, and would go as far as expulsion to those that breaks her rules. When the curse is cast, she becomes the leader of a group of nuns in Storybrooke. She becomes a catalyst in the Final Battle after the arrival of the Black Fairy, as the Blue Fairy herself was partially responsible for the Black Fairy's dark turn.
- Dr. Victor Frankenstein/Dr. Whale (seasons 1–3, 5–6) portrayed by David Anders, is a scientist who believes magic to be inferior to science. He is the older brother of Gerhardt and son of Alphonse. In the Land Without Color, Victor originally seeks a way to restore life to the dead, but has his funding pulled by his father and instead he makes a deal with Rumplestiltskin. When his brother dies Victor successfully resurrects him, and not all is as it seems. When the Evil Queen cast her curse, Victor is sent to the Land Without Magic. In Storybrooke, he is Dr. Whale, a doctor working in Storybrooke General Hospital. After the curse is broken, he leads a mob to Regina's home intending to kill her. He later successfully reanimates Daniel's corpse with a magical heart, turning him into a monster who savagely rips off Whale's arm. Mr. Gold later reattaches his arm. Dr. Whale later helps Dr. Jekyll with his experiments to create a new serum to defeat the Evil Queen but it is crashed by the Evil Queen and Mr. Hyde.
- Geppetto/Marco (seasons 1–4, 6) portrayed by Tony Amendola and Michael Strusievici, is an elderly carpenter and father to his puppet turned boy Pinocchio. In the Enchanted Forest, he became orphaned when Jiminy Cricket accidentally transformed his parents into puppets. He carves himself a son named Pinocchio out of magical wood. During their adventures, Pinocchio sacrifices his life for Geppetto's. For this act, the Blue Fairy turns him into a real boy. She asks him to carve a magical wardrobe with the ability to save the pregnant Snow White and Prince Charming from the Evil Queen's curse. However, the curse would send everyone to a land without magic and Pinocchio, a real boy because of magic, could turn back into a puppet. Geppetto bargains with the fairy to use the second spot for Pinocchio, ultimating in her lying to the other inhabitants, claiming the wardrobe can only save one. Geppetto sends his son to the real world, telling him to protect the child and get them to break the curse. In Storybrooke, he is Marco, the town's handyman. His memories as Geppetto are restored when the curse is broken. Marco later takes in August, who is reverted to Pinocchio by Mother Superior. He is sent back to the Enchanted Forest after Regina undoes the curse and is brought back when Snow White casts a new one. Marco takes August in again after the latter is reverted from his younger form by Mr. Gold while in pursuit of the Author.
- Prince Henry Mills (seasons 1–2, 4–6) portrayed by Tony Perez and Zak Santiago, is the son of King Xavier, husband of Cora Mills and the father of Regina Mills. In the Enchanted Forest, he marries Cora after she demonstrates the ability to spin straw into gold. He loves his daughter very much and would constantly try to protect her from Cora. However, after Regina banishes Cora and becomes the Evil Queen, he becomes her valet. His heart is the used to cast the Dark Curse and his soul ends up in the Underworld. He moves on to Mount Olympus after settling his unfinished business with Regina.
- Genie/Magic Mirror/Sidney Glass (seasons 1, 3–6) portrayed by Giancarlo Esposito, is a man who grants wishes for people who find his bottle that he is stored within. From Agrabah, the Genie is washed away to the Enchanted Forest and was found by King Leopold, who, being extremely wealthy, simply wishes to free the Genie and invite him to live in his castle to help him find true love. There, he falls in love with the King's wife Queen Regina, who fools him to kill Leopold for her to become sole ruler of his kingdom. Realizing the Queen never loved him, he uses his final wish to remain with her forever; thus trapping him in her mirror. As a spirit in the Magic Mirror, he is able to move between and see through other mirrors in the Enchanted Forest, acting as a spy to Regina. In Storybrooke, he is Sidney Glass, a reporter for Storybrooke's local newspaper The Daily Mirror. On Regina's request, he researches Emma Swan's past to help Regina expel her from Storybrooke. After Graham's death, Regina attempts to appoint him sheriff, but he loses the position to Emma. Sidney later secretly works with Regina to gain leverage over Emma. Emma later learns of his deception realizing that he is in love with Regina. Regina uses Mr. Gold to kidnap Kathryn Nolan, framing Mary Margaret (Snow White) for her alleged murder. However, after Kathryn is found alive, Sidney falsely confesses to kidnapping Kathryn to use as an article and become famous. He is then placed into Storybrooke's asylum underneath the hospital. Sidney was later freed by Regina for her quest to remove Maid Marian from Storybrooke, Regina again places Sidney in a mirror. Sidney then allies himself with the Snow Queen, who frees him in exchange for the mirror he was stored in.
- King George/Albert Spencer (seasons 1–2, 6) portrayed by Alan Dale, is the adoptive father of Prince James and his twin Prince David. In the Enchanted Forest, King George and his wife are unable to bear children of their own, leading George to strike a deal with Rumplestiltskin for an heir: James. When James is killed in a duel against Behemoth, his twin brother David is recruited to carry out the task. The task is completed and Midas deems the Prince worthy of marrying his daughter and uniting the kingdoms. George reneges on his promise to return David home and forces him to marry, otherwise he will kill David's mother and burn his home. However, the wedding never happens as David falls in-love with Snow White. After David's engagement with Snow, they lead an army against King George, dethroning him. After the curse is cast, he is the cold-hearted District Attorney Albert Spencer who leads the prosecution for the Kathryn Nolan murder case, against Mary Margaret Blanchard. Following the curse being broken, Spencer murders Billy, framing Ruby in an attempt to show the town that David's incapable of control and is arrested. Spencer is briefly confronted again by David following the latter's discovery of the former's role in the death of David's father Robert, before David learns that Hook is the real killer.
- Princess Abigail/Kathryn Nolan (seasons 1, 3) portrayed by Anastasia Griffith, is the daughter of King Midas and lover of Fredrick. In the Enchanted Forest, she was to marry Prince David, but when he falls in love with Snow White, Abigail helps him run away. She is in love with Frederick, a knight she was to marry until he was turned into gold while protecting her father. Charming later retrieves water from Lake Nostos that revives Frederick, and he reunites with Abigail. In Storybrooke, she is Kathryn Nolan, the wife of David Nolan. David however is in love with Mary Margaret Blanchard, and starts an affair with her. She is later accepted into a law school in Boston, though David refuses to relocate and suggests they end their marriage. Kathryn then learns about David's affair, deciding to move to Boston alone. However, her car is found abandoned at the town's limits, and a missing persons case becomes a murder trial when a heart proven to be Kathryn's is found in Mary Margaret's jewelry box. It is later revealed that Regina worked with Mr. Gold to attempt to frame Mary Margaret for Kathryn's murder, when Mr. Gold in fact kidnapped Kathryn. She is later found alive, though she does not remember her disappearance. Sidney Glass falsely takes the blame for her kidnapping. After the curse is broken, Kathryn and Frederick find each other and live happily together in her home.
- Jefferson/Mad Hatter (seasons 1–2) portrayed by Sebastian Stan, is a thief who is able to jump from world to world with the aid of portals opened by a magic hat he possesses. On a thieving journey to Camelot, he meets a fellow thief named Priscilla with whom he falls in love and has a daughter named Grace. Priscilla is eventually killed while trying to rescue Jefferson from the clutches of the March Hare, who then trapped him in a never-ending tea party, leading Jefferson to give up his life as thief and eke out a meager living as a mushroom seller. He is eventually tempted back into thieving by Regina, who tricks him into going with her to Wonderland, where she leaves him stranded. After the first curse, Jefferson is one of the few residents of Storybrooke to retain his old memories, made all the more painful because he is separated from his daughter in this new reality. After the arrival of the Savior, Jefferson strikes a new deal with Regina in hopes of starting a new life with his daughter, but is again double crossed. However, after the curse is broken, Jefferson is able to reunite with his daughter, now known as Paige and gets his happy ending.
- Princess Aurora (seasons 2–4) portrayed by Sarah Bolger, is the daughter of King Stefan and Queen Leah, Prince Phillip's lover and mother of Phillip Jr. In the Enchanted Forest, she is placed upon a sleeping curse by Maleficent against the crimes of her parents and her soul is sent to the Netherworld. When the Evil Queen cast her curse, Aurora is spared as her kingdom is within the protective barrier done by Cora. Instead, Aurora is frozen for 28 years, with her soul trapped in the Netherworld. After the curse is broken, she is awoken from her deep sleep by Prince Phillip, accompanied by Mulan. Following Phillip's death, Mulan tells Aurora that part of the Enchanted Forest had been spared from the Evil Queen's curse, as Emma Swan and Mary Margaret Blanchard are transported from Storybrooke to the area, after falling into a portal with the wraith. At first, she blames them for Phillip's death, but eventually, she helps them get back to Storybrooke. She and Mulan later successfully recover Phillip's soul and find a wounded Neal Cassidy after he is transported from a portal in Storybrooke, assisting him on his quest to find Emma and Henry. It is later revealed that Aurora and Phillip are expecting a baby, much to Mulan's dismay as she secretly has romantic feelings for her. Aurora and Phillip later greet the inhabitants of Storybrooke in the Enchanted Forest upon their transportation, after Regina undid her curse. It is later revealed that they were under the protection of Zelena, the Wicked Witch of the West, though she transforms them into flying monkeys when they reveal her intentions of stealing Snow White and Prince Charming's baby. After Zelena's defeat, the two are restored to human form and begin to live in Storybrooke, where along with Mary Margaret and Ashley, attends parenting classes with her newborn child.
- Prince Phillip (seasons 2–3) portrayed by Julian Morris, is the lover of Princess Aurora. In the Enchanted Forest, the evil witch Maleficent turned Phillip into a monster called the Yaoguai. Belle uses fairy dust to return Phillip to his human form, who then teams with Mulan to find Aurora. Prince Phillip then teams up with Mulan in search of Princess Aurora. When the curse is cast, they both are frozen for 28 years. Twenty-eight years later, when the curse is weakened, Phillip and Mulan awaken from their frozen state and resume their search for Aurora. They find her some time after the curse officially breaks. He wakes Aurora from her sleeping curse. However, a wraith marks Phillip and the creature sucks out his soul. It is later revealed by Cora that Phillip's soul was merely transported to another world and Aurora and Mulan later restore Phillip's soul. The three then find a wounded Neal Cassidy (Baelfire), assisting him on his quest to find Emma and Henry. It is later revealed that Aurora and Phillip are expecting a child. Aurora and Phillip later greet the inhabitants of Storybrooke in the Enchanted Forest upon their transportation, after Peter Pan's curse took them back to their original worlds. Prior to the curse's reversal, they were under the protection of Zelena, the Wicked Witch of the West, though she transforms them into flying monkeys when they reveal her intentions of stealing Snow White and Prince Charming's baby. After Zelena's defeat, the two are restored to human form and begin to live in Storybrooke.
- Mulan (seasons 2–3, 5) portrayed by Jamie Chung, is a warrior who assists best friend Prince Phillip during his search to rescue his love Princess Aurora. In the Enchanted Forest, Mulan meets Belle and teams up to hunt down a fearsome creature known as the Yaoguai. After finding out that it was Prince Phillip, cursed by a witch, she teams up with him to find Princess Aurora. Due to the casting of the Evil Queen's curse, they both are unable to continue their search as they were frozen for 28 years. Twenty-eight years later, when the curse is weakened, Mulan and Phillip awakens from their frozen state and resume their search for Aurora. They find her some time after the curse officially breaks. After she is rescued, the trio encounter a wraith, who sucks out Phillip's soul. When Emma Swan and Mary Margaret appear in the area, Mulan believes that they were responsible for unleashing the wraith, and for Phillip's death. Mulan later trusts Mary Margaret and Emma, helping them return to Storybrooke. Later, Mulan and Aurora successfully recover Phillip's soul and find a wounded Neal Cassidy after he is transported from a portal in Storybrooke, assisting him on his quest to find Emma and Henry. It is later revealed that Aurora and Phillip are expecting a baby, much to Mulan's dismay as she secretly has romantic feelings for her, though she leaves to join Robin Hood's Merry Men. Mulan later ends up in DunBroch, where she teaches Merida in combat and archery. Then she later teams up with Ruby after she freed her from the Witch and both begin a journey to find Ruby's family of lycans which leads them to the Land of Oz. The two of them later help revive Dorothy after she was placed under a sleeping curse by Zelena.
- Cora Mills/Queen of Hearts (seasons 1–5, Wonderland) portrayed by Barbara Hershey, Rose McGowan, and Jennifer Koenig, is the wife of Prince Henry Mills, mother of Zelena and Regina Mills, grandmother of Henry Mills and Robin, and the great-grandmother of Lucy Mills. In the Enchanted Forest, Cora gives birth to Zelena and abandons the child in a basket, where she was swept up into a tornado and brought to Oz. She becomes a Princess, marrying Prince Henry and gives birth to Regina, and harnesses her magical abilities with Rumplestiltskin's help. Controlling Regina to become Queen, Cora is sent to Wonderland through a magical portal in the form of a looking glass, where she becomes the Queen of Hearts and teaches Anastasia magic. When Killian is sent to kill her, Cora returns to the Enchanted Forest with him, shielding a corner of the realm from Regina's Dark Curse. Once the curse broke, Cora follows Emma and Snow to Storybrooke with Hook after they ended up in the Enchanted Forest. In Storybrooke, she turns a rehabilitating Regina back to evil but is unintentionally killed by Regina. In the Underworld, Cora is the Mayor of Underbrooke. Per Hades' command, Cora tries to get Regina out of the land, but fails. She is then rescued by Regina and decides to make amends with Zelena. After healing the broken bond between Zelena and Regina, Cora is granted entrance into Mount Olympus.
- William Smee (seasons 2–4, 6–7) portrayed by Chris Gauthier, is a man capable of procuring objects that are hard to find. In the Enchanted Forest, he makes a deal with Rumplestiltskin to get his life extended; Smee trades him a magic bean for his age reversal. Captain Hook manages to intervene and kidnaps Smee to obtain the bean, later appointing him as a crewman on his ship, the Jolly Roger. Hook uses the bean to create a portal that takes the ship to Neverland where he and his crew will never age. In Neverland, Smee serves as an adviser to Hook, assisting in his murderous aspirations to kill Rumplestiltskin and to raise the newly arrived Baelfire. In Storybrooke, Smee appears as a homeless man who kidnaps Belle under the orders of her father Moe French. Mr. Gold later uses him as an experiment for his spell that would enable anyone to cross the border to Storybrooke without losing their memories. When Hook arrives in Storybrooke, Smee immediately begins following orders, retrieving Mr. Gold's most prized possession – Baelfire's shawl. In retaliation, Gold turns Smee into a rat. He is later reformed to his human body when the Dark Curse is reversed and returns to serving Captain Hook.
- Owen Flynn/Greg Mendell (seasons 2–3) portrayed by Ethan Embry and Benjamin Stockham, is the son of Kurt Flynn. In the Land Without Magic, as a young boy, he camped out in the woods of Maine in 1983 with his father. On that night, the Dark Curse took everyone to this new world that becomes Storybrooke. Owen enjoys Regina's company. However, this only leads her trying to keep him and his father in Storybrooke. Owen escapes after Kurt is falsely arrested by Regina, vowing to return to his father. More than 28 years later, a man crashes his car into Storybrooke. His name is later revealed to be Greg Mendell, an alias of Owen. When Greg is brought to the hospital, the residents debate whether to save his life and risk the truth of Storybrooke being revealed to the outside world. He is ultimately saved, and remains in the town to investigate the strange happenings of Storybrooke. Regina eventually learns of Greg's identity, telling him to leave the town. Greg ignores her, as it is revealed he is in alliance with Neal Cassidy's fiancée, Tamara. The two kidnap Regina and torture her to reveal his father's whereabouts. She eventually tells him that she killed his father. A hurt Greg plans to kill Regina but escapes when David Nolan tracks him down. Greg and Tamara later obtain a trigger to obliterate Storybrooke, though it is foiled. The two instead kidnap Henry Mills, travelling to Neverland. Upon their arrival, Greg and Tamara realize that they had been fooled. When confronted by the Lost Boys, the pair refuse to hand Henry to them, causing Peter Pan's Shadow to rip out Greg's shadow from his body, killing him instantly.
- Tamara/Her (seasons 2–3) portrayed by Sonequa Martin-Green, is Neal's fiancé and Greg Mendell's lover. Her hatred of magic makes her determined to remove magic from the Land Without Magic, seeing it as unholy. Tracking the Dragon in Hong Kong, she crosses paths with August Booth. After the Dragon reveals himself, Tamara seemingly kills him. Since then, she joins the Home Office, an organisation involved believed to fight magical creatures and gets involved with Greg Mendell. She then tracks down August and finds out about Storybrooke. To get closer, she "accidentally" bumps into Neal Cassidy and gets into a relationship with him. After the curse breaks, Tamara comes to Storybrooke and reunites with Greg. During her time in Storybrooke, she tries to kill August to prevent him from warning the others. After finding a tigger that can eliminate Storybrooke, she and Greg triggers it as a distraction to kidnap Henry to Neverland, where Tamara finds out that the Home Office is fake. As she attempts to escape the Lost Boys, she is struck by an arrow. Mr. Gold later inquires her for Henry's whereabouts before taking her heart out and crushing it.
- Felix (seasons 2–3) portrayed by Parker Croft, is a member of the Lost Boys and Peter Pan's right-hand boy. In Neverland, he leads the group into searching Captain Hook's ship for Baelfire, whom he eventually finds and delivers to Peter Pan, though he is not the boy wanted – Henry Mills. When Neal arrives in Neverland to save his son Henry, Felix captures him until being knocked out after he breaks free. Upon his capture of the group from Storybrooke, Felix is taken to the town and placed in jail, until Peter Pan breaks him free, explaining his plot to make the town "The New Neverland" with possession of the original Dark Curse. However, Pan reveals he needs the heart of the thing he loves most to enact it. As Felix was the most loyal to him, Pan uses his heart to enact the curse, thus killing him as a sacrifice.
- Malcolm/Peter Pan/Pied Piper (seasons 3, 5–6) portrayed by Robbie Kay and Stephen Lord, is the father of Rumplestiltskin, a former lover of the Black Fairy, the grandfather of Baelfire and Gideon, the great-grandfather of Henry Mills, and the great-great-grandfather of Lucy Mills. In the Enchanted Forest, Malcolm leaves his son in the care of two spinners, who give Rumplestiltskin a magical bean to create a portal to leave his careless father. Using the magic bean, Malcolm and Rumplestiltskin travel to Neverland, a place which Malcolm envisions in his dreams. He decides to stay in Neverland, abandoning Rumplestilskin. Malcolm transforms into his younger self, adopting the name of Peter Pan. The Shadow informs Pan that his youth is limited, and he will die when the hourglass of Skull Rock is complete. Some time later, Pan visits Hamelin in the Enchanted Forest posing as the Pied Piper to expand what would later become the Lost Boys. He also blackmails John and Michael Darling to help him with his tasks, in exchange for their sister Wendy's life, who had been lured back to Neverland, sending them to the Land Without Magic before the Queen's curse to retrieve a boy soon-to-be-born. After Henry is brought to Neverland, he tricks him by being a fugitive boy. He later reveals to Henry that he has the Heart of the Truest Believer. Pan falsely claims to Henry that magic is dying in Neverland, persuading him to give him his heart, leading Henry to temporarily die. After Pan traps Gold inside Pandora's Box, Regina successfully reclaims Henry's heart and revives him, before Pan swaps his and Henry's souls. Once in Storybrooke, he steals the Dark Curse's scroll from Regina's vault and casts a new curse, but is eventually killed by Rumplestilskin and regresses back to Malcolm in the process and his curse was undone by Regina. After death, Malcolm's Peter Pan form ends up in the Underworld. When the heroes arrive in the Underworld, Pan plans to return to the living by exchanging one of their lives. Mr. Gold later enlists Pan as part of a loophole for a deal with Hades that involves abducting Zelena before the two of them can have dinner together. After the contract for Gold and Belle's baby is ripped up by Hades, Pan and Mr. Gold then plan to use Robin's heart to revive Pan. However, it was a trick by Mr. Gold as the heart he has put into Pan's body is actually a wineskin he had filled with water from the River of Lost Souls and glamoured as a heart sending him into the River of Lost Souls.
- Tinker Bell (seasons 3, 6) portrayed by Rose McIver, is a fairy who began training under the guidance of the Blue Fairy. In the Enchanted Forest, after she breaks some fairy rules, including interacting with the Evil Queen and stealing pixie dust, Tinker Bell is stripped of her wings and made human by the Blue Fairy. Tinker Bell later travels to Neverland. Some years later, she forgives Regina and helps to find her son Henry who had been kidnapped by the sinister Peter Pan. She successfully arrives in Storybrooke with the rest of Storybrooke's residents, where she manages to kill Peter Pan's shadow. Her actions result in saving Mother Superior whose shadow was ripped from her body by Peter Pan's. Mother Superior restores Tinker Bell to fairy status. After returning to the Enchanted Forest and with Snow's baby threaten to be taken by the Wicked Witch, she and Blue and the other fairies search the woods for enchanted objects to defeat Zelena. She later returns to Storybrooke with everyone and encourages Regina to be with Robin Hood after finding out he's her soulmate. She then helps her friends search for answers about a way to stop Zelena when she challenges Regina to a fight.
- Ariel (seasons 3–4, 6) portrayed by JoAnna Garcia Swisher, is a mermaid who is first seen saving Snow White, after she escapes from the Evil Queen Regina's knights by diving into waters from a high cliff. Ariel reveals that she can bear legs upon land for 12 hours according to the sea goddess Ursula's legend. To repay Ariel, Snow takes Ariel to a ball where she meets Prince Eric, a man whom Ariel saved a year prior after a shipwreck. Eric invites Ariel to travel with him, though Regina poses as Ursula to trick Ariel into giving Snow a bracelet that makes her a mermaid, for her to fulfill her wishes and escape to travel the world. However, Ariel discovers Ursula's true identity and stabs Regina after she attempts to kill Snow. Ariel returns to Eric's castle, only to have her voice stolen by Regina, being unable to communicate with him. Regina later summons Ariel to Neverland, revealing that mermaids can travel through realms. After restoring Ariel's voice, she promises to return her legs if she retrieves Pandora's Box from Mr. Gold's shop to defeat Peter Pan. After she completes the quest, Regina gives her the ability to use both her legs and fins with a special bracelet, allowing her to continue her search for Eric in Storybrooke. With help from Belle, she finds Eric as a fisherman and the two reconcile. After Pan enacts his curse, Ariel, along with the other inhabitants, are returned to their original worlds. It is later revealed that Eric was kidnapped by the pirate Blackbeard and sent to Hangman's Island. Ariel eventually reunites with Eric and settles on the island, which was spared from the effects of Snow White's curse. Sometime later, Ariel gets accidentally trapped inside a bottle with the Jolly Roger by Elsa and is later freed by Hook and then helps him by bringing King Poseidon to Storybrooke.
- Wendy Darling (seasons 2–3) portrayed by Freya Tingley, is the eldest daughter of Mr. and Mrs. Darling, and sister to John and Michael. When Baelfire breaks into her house, she takes him in and hides him in her room. Every day, secretly, she would bring him food, but is caught one day by her parents whom lets Baelfire stay with the family. One night, she tells Baelfire about the Shadow who possesses magic. She is warned by Baelfire to never associate herself with magic, but she ignores his warning and goes with the Shadow to Neverland. The next day, she tells Baelfire that the Shadow is coming for her brothers. Together, they fight off the Shadow, but Baelfire lets the Shadow takes him to protect Wendy and her family. When Baelfire fails to return, Wendy and her brothers goes to Neverland to save him, but gets caught by Peter Pan. Wendy is kept a prisoner for over a century while her brothers do Pan's bidding to keep her alive. A year after the curse broke, Wendy is still a prisoner of Pan, who is using an adult John and Michael to head to Storybrooke to prevent Belle and Ariel from giving Mr. Gold Pandora's box, which he and Regina are seeking to defeat Pan in exchange for Wendy's freedom. Pan later forces Wendy to pretend to be ill for Henry to harness his belief in magic, before she is returned to her cage. Mr. Gold is instructed by Ariel to attempt to save Wendy on his quest to kill Pan. Wendy is later saved by Baelfire, this time known as Neal, and in return she informs him and the rest of the group of Pan's intentions to kill Henry. She is then rescued and escapes Neverland and reunites with her brothers in Storybrooke.
- Queen Elsa (seasons 3–4) portrayed by Georgina Haig, is the elder daughter of the King of Arendelle and Queen Gerda, older sister of Anna and the older niece of Ingrid and Helga. In Arendelle, with Anna away in the Enchanted Forest, Elsa meets her long forgotten aunt Ingrid and learns part of her mother's secret past. However, her relationship with Ingrid strains after Anna's return. As Ingrid wishes to form a new family with Elsa, and after finding Anna unfit, Elsa is entrapped in an urn by Anna, who was cursed by Ingrid. The urn ends up in Rumplestiltskin's possession and because of Emma and Hook, it ends up in present-day Storybrooke via time travel. Elsa's complicated past with Ingrid is revealed as she and Emma bands together to stop Ingrid from succeeding with her spell. Elsa is reunited with Anna, and after witnessing Ingrid's sacrifice, she returns to Arendelle with Anna and Kristoff to reclaim the kingdom from Hans and his brothers, and to prepare for her sister's wedding.
- Princess Anna (season 4) portrayed by Elizabeth Lail, is the second daughter of the King and Queen of Arendelle, younger sister of Elsa, younger niece of Ingrid and Helga and the fiancé, later wife of Kristoff. When she was a teenager, her and Elsa's parents travel on a mission to the Enchanted Forest, searching for a cure to her sister's powers. However, they are involved in a storm and die in a shipwreck. Elsa discovers this years later, leading Anna to venture to the Enchanted Forest to fulfill their parents' last mission, delaying her wedding to Kristoff. Returning to Arendelle with questions outstanding, Anna becomes suspicious of Ingrid (the Snow Queen) who claims to be her aunt. Ingrid imprisons Anna, using a spell to have her turn on Elsa, resulting in Anna trapping Elsa in the urn. Before Anna can register what has occurred and attempting to get Elsa back, Ingrid then freezes Anna and Kristoff and the kingdom of Arendelle. Thirty years later, Arendelle thaws and Anna and Kristoff escape from Anna's sinister previous lover Prince Hans. With help from Blackbeard, Prince Hans captures the pair who then are placed in a trunk and thrown off the ship. In Storybrooke, Elsa discovers Anna's necklace in Mr. Gold's pawn shop and vows to find her. When Elsa wishes for Anna to return using her Wishing Star necklace, she inadvertently brings Anna from Arendelle to Storybrooke. Anna discovers her mother's letter, leading Ingrid to destroy herself and be with her sisters once more. Anna, along with Elsa and Kristoff, return to Arendelle and reclaim the kingdom from Hans and his brothers just in time for her wedding.
- Marian (seasons 2–4) portrayed by Christie Laing, is the wife of Robin Hood and mother of Roland. Initially the target for the affection of the Sheriff of Nottingham, she runs away with Robin after falling in love with him. Sometime later, Marian is pregnant and falls ill, causing Robin Hood to obtain a magic wand from Rumplestiltskin's castle to heal her. Marian later gives birth to a son named Roland, though she ends up wanted by the Evil Queen and is sentenced to death. Years later, after Zelena opens a time-travel portal, Emma and Hook are dragged into it and sent to the Enchanted Forest of the past. Emma decides to rescue Marian, but she is later killed by Zelena.
- Kristoff (season 4) portrayed by Scott Michael Foster, is the lover and later husband of Princess Anna. Originally set to marry Anna, she puts the wedding on hold to find the truth behind her parents' deaths. After Ingrid attempts to harm Anna, Kristoff attempts to save her, only for the couple to be frozen solid by Ingrid. Thirty years later, Arendelle thaws and Anna and Kristoff escape from the sinister Prince Hans, having now taken over the kingdom. With help from Blackbeard, Prince Hans capture Anna and Kristoff, who are thrown from his ship inside a trunk. In Storybrooke, Elsa using Anna's necklace to unintentionally save Anna and Kristoff from drowning in the trunk and brings them to the town. After Ingrid destroys herself, Kristoff returns to Arendelle with Anna and Elsa and reclaims the kingdom just in time for his and Anna's wedding.
- Ingrid/Snow Queen/Sarah Fisher (season 4) portrayed by Elizabeth Mitchell and Brighton Sharbino, the oldest daughter of King Harald and Queen Sonja, elder sister of Helga and Gerda, and the aunt of Elsa and Anna. As a child, Ingrid discovers that she has inherited ice magic and unintentionally kills her sister Helga, forcing Gerda to entrap Ingrid in an urn. Now as the Snow Queen, Ingrid is freed and reunites with her nieces Elsa and Anna. However, as Anna is unfit to be family, Ingrid, with the help of the Apprentice, goes to the Land Without Magic to find the yet-to-be-born Emma. Hoping that she will be reunited with both Elsa and Emma, she moves to Storybrooke as Sarah Fisher. When Elsa is brought to the town, Ingrid sees her opportunity to finally complete her family. She casts the Spell of Shattered Sight to remove the rest of Storybrooke's residents, but upon realizing that she has always had her sisters' love, she sacrifices herself to undo the spell.
- The Apprentice (seasons 4–5) portrayed by Timothy Webber and Graham Verchere, is an elderly man who works for the sorcerer Merlin in Camelot and later the Enchanted Forest. He protects his teacher's creation, a box capable of transforming into a hat for absorbing and accumulating magic, from each person that takes on the Dark One's powers. A Dark One, Rumplestiltskin, later manages to steal the hat, but it is then taken by Princess Anna of Arendelle. Some time later, Ingrid obtains the hat and gives it back to the Apprentice in exchange for a portal to the real world for Ingrid to complete her family. Snow White and Prince Charming also cross paths with the Apprentice, offering them a spell to remove any potential darkness from their expected baby. After they obtain Maleficent's egg, the Apprentice places the darkness inside and transports it to the real world. The Apprentice later confronts the Author for manipulating the transportation of Maleficent's egg and imprisons him for his irresponsibility. In Storybrooke, the Apprentice is visited by Mr. Gold, who uses the hat to place the Apprentice inside and use its power to be cleaved of the Dark One's dagger's control. Mother Superior later frees the Apprentice from the hat. He later helps to save Mr. Gold's life by placing the Dark One's dark powers into the hat. Unfortunately, the darkness escapes and enters the Apprentice's body which weakens him. While in a weakened state, he reveals that Merlin is the only one who can stop the darkness forever after it is taken in by Emma Swan. He then procures a wand to assist the residents in their transport to Camelot to find him. Afterward, the Apprentice takes his last breath and dies. Henry later encounters the Apprentice in the Underworld where he learns that the Apprentice's unfinished business is to make sure Henry does the right thing if he happens to get the key to the Sorcerer's Mansion from Sheriff James where the Magic Quill is contained.
- Maleficent (seasons 1–2, 4, 7, Wonderland) portrayed by Kristin Bauer van Straten, is the mother of Lilith Page via Zorro. Failed to curse Queen Briar Rose, Maleficent curses both Princess Aurora and Prince Phillip after gaining strength from Regina. In dragon form, Maleficent become pregnant after intimacy with Zorro. After this, Prince David places a true love potion into Maleficent's dragon form. Some time later, Regina visits Maleficent and steals the Dark Curse from her. After laying her egg, it is stolen by Snow White and Prince David and unintentionally send to the Land Without Magic by the Apprentice. When the Dark Curse is cast, Maleficent is sent to the Land Without Magic. In Storybrooke, Regina traps Maleficent in her dragon form beneath Storybrooke's abandoned library and is slain by Emma to retrieve the true love potion, leaving her in an undead form. When Cruella and Ursula arrive in Storybrooke with Rumplestiltskin, they resurrect Maleficent to get even with the heroes. Maleficent then reunites with her daughter Lilith and together they locate Lilith's father, Zorro. After the creation of the United Realms, Maleficent is invited for Regina's coronation, but does not RSVP.
- Ursula (season 4) portrayed by Merrin Dungey and Tiffany Boone, is the daughter of King Poseidon. In the Oceanic Realm, as a mermaid, she is forced by her father to sing and lure pirates to their death. Hoping for a better life, Ursula joins Killian to travel far from her realm. But with interruptions from her father, she loses her voice to Killian. Out for vengeance, she turns herself into a sea witch and takes over the Oceanic Realm. She then befriends Maleficent and Cruella and works to escape Regina's curse. Unintentionally, she is sent to the Land Without Magic with Cruella and Maleficent's egg where she uses the egg to keep herself from aging. Many years later, Ursula works as an aquarium worker in New York. Rumplestiltskin finds her and offers her a happy ending if she works with him, Cruella and Maleficent. Entering Storybrooke, Killian makes a deal with Ursula for information regarding Rumplestiltskin's plan in-exchange for her singing voice. When this fails, Killian retrieves King Poseidon with Ariel's help, who apologises to Ursula for his past actions. Reconciling with her father upon having her singing voice returned, Ursula leaves with him to return to the Oceanic Realm.
- Cruella De Vil/Cruella Feinberg (seasons 4–5) portrayed by Victoria Smurfit and Milli Wilkinson, is the daughter of Madeline. In 1920s England, Cruella kills her father, stepfathers, and later her mother and her dalmatian dogs. To prevent her from taking another soul, Isaac uses his author abilities and seals her fate. Cruella later teams up with Maleficent and Ursula to stop the casting of the Dark Curse, but is accidentally sent to the Land Without Magic. Cruella marries a rich man, Mr. Feinberg and takes on the identity of Cruella Feinberg. Years later, Rumplestiltskin brings her and Ursula to Storybrooke where they resurrect Maleficent to find the Author to rewrite their endings but is killed by Emma, ending up in the Underworld. When the heroes ends up in the Underworld to save Killian, she tries to prevent them from leaving, but fails. In Sir Mordred's bar, she expresses her dissatisfaction of the Underworld, but refuses to move on.
- Isaac Heller (seasons 4, 6) portrayed by Patrick Fischler, is an author. Working as a television sales person in the Land Without Magic, Isaac is offered the position of being an author by the Apprentice who takes him to Fairy Tale Land to record stories of its inhabitants. During his time as the author, he manipulates his power to alter the life of many, including Cruella De Vil, Snow White, Prince Charming, Maleficent, Ursula, and Lilith, prompting the Apprentice to trap Isaac in the Once Upon a Time book as punishment. Despite being trapped, the book is constantly updated until the Dark Curse is cast, and Isaac's writing comes to a halt. Years later, he is sought by many wanting to alter their fate for a happy ending. Isaac is freed from the book and aligns himself with Rumplestiltskin as he too wishes to alter his own fate. Once obtaining ink for his quill, Isaac alters the Storybrooke inhabitants’ fate, sucking everyone but Henry into the World Within the Book. His wrongdoing is then undone by Henry, who became the new author, and he is imprisoned by David and Snow for all his crimes, including what he made David and Snow do under his former pen in order to hurt them both. He is later freed by Regina in exchange for information about the ending of the Once Upon a Time book. After revealing the fate of the Savior and the Final Battle, Isaac leaves Storybrooke and returns to the Land Without Magic.
- Lilith Page/Starla (season 4) portrayed by Agnes Bruckner and Nicole Munoz, is the daughter of Maleficent. Born inside an egg, she is transported from the Enchanted Forest to the Land Without Magic after Snow White and Prince Charming attempt to rid their daughter Emma Swan of any potential darkness. As an orphan, Lilith is adopted into the Page Family in Hopkins, Minnesota, though she runs away after feeling alone. She meets a similar-aged Emma who befriends her after realizing their supposed similar orphan situation but parts ways after Emma finds out that Lilith has a family of her own. Lilith later tracks Emma down at her new foster family and after unintentionally destroying Emma's life with them, Lilith decides to part ways with Emma for good. Aboard a bus, she is approached by the Apprentice who tells her about her origin and how Emma's parents are responsible for the damage of her family. Lilith later begins plotting a way to Storybrooke to get even. Years later, per Maleficent's request, Emma tracks Lilith, who goes by the name of Starla, down and convinces her to go back with her to Storybrooke. Lilith lies to her and convinces Emma that her life turned out fine but later steals Emma's car with the Sorcerer's scroll to get into Storybrooke. The two eventually make amends and Lilith is reunited with Maleficent in Storybrooke. She convinces Maleficent to get revenge on Prince Charming and Snow White, but Maleficent chooses to let it go, causing her to down the revenge pay on her own by turning into a dragon. Eventually, she listens to Maleficent by giving up on revenge. Little did she and her mother know, but Isaac Heller is the one responsible for what happened to her and her family by acting through Emma's parents with his pen in order to hurt them both. Briefly, Lilith, along the other Storybrooke inhabitants, is sent to the Alternate World after Isaac Heller rewrites the Once Upon a Time book but is returned shortly afterward. Following Isaac's defeat, Lilith decides to stay in Storybrooke permanently with Maleficent, at the same time, to locate her father. By the end of the series, it was revealed that Maleficent reunited with the father of Lily who turns out to be Zorro.
- Merlin (seasons 4–5) portrayed by Elliot Knight and voiced by Jonathan Adams is a powerful sorcerer. Running in a desert, Merlin is gifted water in the form of a Holy Grail due to thirst by the Gods which gives him magical ability. Merlin uses his magic to help others in-need in Camelot. One day, he is approached by Nimue who needed help from Vortigan, a man who attacked her village. Eventually, Nimue becomes power hungry after drinking the water from the Holy Grail and Merlin is forced to tender her to a dagger, making her the first Dark One. Some time later, Nimue gets even with Merlin and turns him into a tree. Trapped in the tree, Merlin prophecies the future of Camelot, where Arthur would become the King of the realm. In the Land Without Magic, briefly by unknown means, Merlin appears as an usher to a young Emma Swan, warning her to never pull Excalibur from its stone in the future. Years later, he is freed from his imprisonment by Regina and Emma, causing King Arthur and his knights to rebel against him for aiding Regina and Emma. Merlin tried to remove the darkness from Emma, but Emma refused as it would result in the death of Hook. When Hook becomes a Dark One as well, Merlin records a message for the heroes on how to defeat the darkness, but is interrupted by Hook, who wishes to cast the Dark Curse to send everyone back to Storybrooke to get revenge on Mr. Gold. Hook, as Nimue, rips Merlin's heart and crushes it into a pot with the curse's ingredients which enacts the curse.
- King Arthur (season 5) portrayed by Liam Garrigan and Webb Baker Hayes, is the ruler of Camelot. As a young boy, it was prophesied by Merlin that he will become the King of Camelot. Sometime later, he pulls Excalibur out from the stone, but notices that half of the sword is missing. He then marries Guinevere and makes her Queen of Camelot. Later on, using the Sands of Avalon, he turns his tower into a castle. Years later, he greets the inhabitants of Storybrooke into Camelot, who are seeking Merlin. While there are in Camelot, he discovers the missing piece of Excalibur—the dagger of the Dark One. He manipulates events to get the dagger, eventually working with Zelena and binding Merlin to Excalibur, forcing him to kill the heroes. Emma intervenes, forcing Arthur and Zelena to retreat. He later works with Zelena to get an Enchanted Helm from DunBroch, but is defeated by Merida and her clans. Later, when Hook—the newest Dark One cast another curse, Arthur is sent to Storybrooke. In Storybrooke, Arthur reunites with the other inhabitants of Camelot and forms a camp nearby. He also works with the heroes to find out what happened back in Camelot, due to everyone's memories of their time in Camelot being erased by the curse. He is later arrested by David for deceiving the heroes but escapes some time later. He then crosses paths with Hades, who ends up killing him, thus sending him to the Underworld. There, he helps Hook in sending a message to Emma of a way to defeat Hades. After succeeding, a portal to Mount Olympus opened for both of them, but Arthur chose to stay behind and repair his new "broken kingdom", the Underworld. This worked as he has overthrown Cruella and ruled over the Underworld for over 50 years.
- Queen Merida (season 5) portrayed by Amy Manson, is the daughter of King Fergus and Queen Elinor and sister to her triplet brothers. When her mother is transformed into a bear by the Witch of DunBroch, she helps transform her back to human form. Years later, she witness the death of her father, resulting in her being the next Queen of DunBroch. When the United Clans claims that she's unfit to rule, they kidnaps her triplet brothers in a form of protest. While searching for her brothers, she meets Emma, the new Dark One. At first, she was willing to help Emma, but eventually betrays her after a misunderstanding. She is later jailed by Arthur, but is freed by Merlin. Kidnapping Belle, she makes her help in the search of her brothers, eventually rescuing them. She also finds out that Arthur was responsible for the death of her father. On a horseback ride to Camelot, she is swept away to Storybrooke by the curse cast by Hook. In Storybrooke upon being brought there by the Dark Curse, Merida became a minion for Emma as she has her heart to train Mr. Gold to become heroic enough to release Excalibur and at the same time use him to kill Emma. Mr. Gold passed this event by defeating Merida's bear form. Upon releasing Mr. Gold and Merida from her clutches, Emma then tells Merida that her three brothers are safe with their mother in DunBroch. She is then asked by Regina to guard Emma but ends up being knocked out by Hook. Merida then receives her memories back along with everyone else by Emma, and is later asked to watch Arthur in his jail cell while they travel to Underworld to bring Hook back. Eventually, the heroes open a portal for her, the Camelot inhabitants, and the Merry Men to return to the Enchanted Forest where she later returns home to DunBroch.
- Queen Guinevere (season 5) portrayed by Joana Metrass and Dalila Bela, is the wife of King Arthur who resides in Camelot. As a young girl, she believed in Arthur's dreams of becoming a king, and that upon returning with Excalibur she became his wife. Unfortunately, she would become neglected by Arthur's obsession with Excalibur, resulting in her falling for Lancelot. The two even went on a mission to seek out the Dark One's dagger. Thanks to a deal made by Rumplestiltskin, she traded the gauntlet in exchange for the magical sands that came from the sap of a tree that is found on Avalon. When Arthur finds out about her feelings for Lancelot, he takes the sands and uses it on Guinevere to make her follow his orders and then they both use it to fix Camelot and make it into a castle. She then uses the sand on David and Mary Margaret so they can follow Arthur's orders but they are later free from it thanks to Merlin. Guinevere is among those that ended up in Storybrooke with her memory of the last six weeks erased, thanks to a new curse cast by Hook as the new Dark One. She is later sent to the Enchanted Forest and then back to Camelot, alongside her people, the Merry Men and Merida.
- Sir Lancelot (seasons 2, 5) portrayed by Sinqua Walls, is the son of the Lady of the Lake, and one of King Arthur's knights of the round table. During his tenure, Lancelot witnesses Arthur free Excalibur from its stone, though abandons his place on the Round Table after falling in love with Arthur's wife Guinevere. After leaving Camelot, he became a servant of King George under the alias of Leviathan. Under the orders of King George, Lancelot captures Snow White and brings her to him, unintentionally allowing King George to curse her with water that makes her barren forever. Lancelot revisits Snow, mentioning that he had no knowledge of the water's content. Using the remnants of the water in Lake Nostos, Lancelot is able to undo the curse on Snow White. At some point, he returns to Camelot and sneaks into King Arthur's castle. During the night where David is bestowed the Siege Perilous seat by Arthur, Snow White goes out to the hallway to calm down her crying baby son where she sees a shadowy figure walk past. When she calls out to the person, Lancelot steps out much to her astonishment. He assures her it is truly him. After putting aside the story of his struggles, Lancelot warns her about a villain that is currently in the castle. At first, Snow assumes he is speaking about Emma. Instead, Lancelot reveals that King Arthur is the villain and Camelot is not what it seems. When Arthur found out that Lancelot was alive and confronted him and Mary Margaret in the Dark One's Vault, David found out where the suspicions towards King Arthur were confirmed. When the rest of the Knights arrive at Granny's to help King Arthur, Lancelot also discovered that Guinevere was under Arthur's command thanks to the sand dust that was used on her by King Arthur. Lancelot is locked up in the dungeon where he meets Merida as they both plan to find a way to defeat King Arthur. Both of them are freed by David's group with the help of Merlin. Following Captain Hook being tethered to Excalibur and becoming the new Dark One in the process, Merlin sends Sir Lancelot to his mother, the Lady of the Lake; his status from here onwards is unknown.
- Violet Morgan (seasons 5–6) portrayed by Olivia Steele-Falconer, is the daughter of Sir Morgan. She hopes to follow her late mother's footsteps as a champion horseback rider. When the Storybrooke inhabitants comes to Camelot, she and Henry grow close over their shared passion for music. Emma manipulates their burgeoning relationship to break Henry's heart and obtain his teardrop as a spell component to free Merlin. Later, the Dark Curse sends Violet and her father to the Land Without Magic, along with much of Camelot's population. With their memories erased, she and Henry are again attracted to each other. After Henry recovers Violet's missing horse, Nicodemus, they share a kiss. Violet accompanies Henry to New York City in his quest to destroy magic, and returns to Storybrooke with him. When the other Camelot residents leave, Violet tells Henry that she and her father will be staying because Sir Morgan is originally from Connecticut in Henry's world. Violet becomes a student at Storybrooke High. When Henry realizes the Evil Queen is impersonating Regina, Violet invents an excuse to help Henry escape during their date. She continues to date Henry after the Final Battle, but eventually they break up.
- The Blind Witch (seasons 1, 5) portrayed by Emma Caulfield, is a witch who resides at her Gingerbread Home made completely out of candy deep in the woods. Her house and the treats lure in children, whom she would cook and eat. At some point, the Blind Witch comes to possess the Evil Queen's poisoned apple. One day, the Evil Queen bargains with two young children, named Hansel and Gretel, to find their lost father, in return for stealing a poisoned apple from the witch. However, despite the Queen's warning not to eat anything, Hansel licks some frosting off a cupcake, awakening the witch. She tries to eat Hansel and Gretel but they trick her and lock her in her own oven. The Queen, who was watching the events through her mirror, sends a bolt of fire through the mirror and sets the oven alight. Since her death, the Blind Witch works at the Underworld's version of Granny's Diner when she encounters Mary Margaret. She hasn't forgiven Regina for sending Hansel and Gretel to retrieve the apple and for burning her alive. Mary Margaret gets the Blind Witch to tell them where they can find Hercules. She tips them off by stating that he comes in from the shipyards during his lunch hour. The Blind Witch later informs Emma, Regina, and Red about where they can find Auntie Em stating that where she works is the competition to her business. She later acquired powers from Hades to keep the outsiders from escaping the Underworld in exchange for taking over the realm with Cruella when Hades leaves, this after Regina discovered that she wasn't supposed to have any ability to obtain magic. After the heroes escape the Underworld, she continues her work in the Underbrooke diner at the time of King Arthur's arrival after he was killed by Hades.
- Hades (season 5) portrayed by Greg Germann, is the God of the Underworld. He is the son of Kronos, brother of Zeus and the uncle of Hercules. After his father Cronus appoints Zeus as the next ruler of Mount Olympus, he kills him. Zeus then stops his heart from beating and banishes him to the Underworld to be its ruler. One day, he appeared before Liam Jones and offered to let the ship sink in exchange that Liam and Killain be spared and the Eye of the Storm will be in their possession. Years later, he meets Zelena in the Land of Oz and was interested in her time travelling spell. He fell in love with her but Zelena saw it as a trick and asked him to go back to the Underworld. When Emma and her allies arrive in the Underworld, he forces Cora to get rid of the heroes from his land. Failing, he turns Cora back into a miller and forces her to work at an underground mill for her failure. After Hercules and Megara ascend to Mount Olympus, Hades decides to trap the heroes in the Underworld by forcing Hook to write a new name on a gravestone for each soul that leaves. When Hook refuses, he hangs Hook over the River of Lost Souls. He also sends Captain Silver to the Worst Place and tries sending Hook, later Liam, there but fails. He also buys the contract made by Rumplestiltskin years ago with Fendrake, threatening to take Mr. Gold's second unborn child with Belle. He is later reunited with Zelena, who falls in love with him. When she is kidnapped, he asks Emma's help to get her back. Later, after his heart starts beating again due to true love's kiss, a portal is opened. He turns over the Underworld to Cruella as he leaves for Storybrooke with Zelena and her child. There, he kills King Arthur and hopes to take over Storybrooke. Using the Olympian Crystal, he kills Robin Hood. Zelena then kills him with the Crystal.
- Dr. Henry Jekyll (seasons 5–6) portrayed by Hank Harris, is a physician. In Victorian England, he tries to join the Academy of Sciences run by Dr. Lydgate but he turns him down, claiming that his experiments are too dangerous. With Rumplestiltskin's help, Dr. Jekyll uses a serum to change his personality, along with his looks and shows up uninvited at a party hosted by Dr. Lydgate. He also ends up in a relationship with Mary while as Mr. Hyde. When Mary finds out that he used the serum to pose as Mr. Hyde, they both engage in a rough fight, leading to Dr. Jekyll accidentally pushing her from her bedroom window, falling to her death. He later goes to the Land of Untold Stories. When David, Snow, Zelena and Hook accidentally get sent there through a portal, Dr. Jekyll meets them but is afraid to help them because of what the Warden might do to him. Later, he finishes the serum he developed to separate his good side and his evil side and Hyde separates from him. He is later rescued by David, Snow, Zelena and Hook and is taken along with them to Storybrooke to live a better life. He later works with Dr. Whale in his garage to make a new serum to defeat the Serum Evil Queen. He later tries to hurt Belle, resulting in Hook killing him. The side effect also kills Mr. Hyde.
- Mr. Hyde (seasons 5–6) portrayed by Sam Witwer, is Dr. Jekyll's alter ego. In Victorian England, after Dr. Jekyll, with the help of Rumplestiltskin, creates a serum, he uses it to transform himself to Mr. Hyde. He threatens to expose Dr. Lydgate's affair with his assistant if he does not give a place in the academy for Dr. Jekyll. He then ends up in a relationship with Mary, but she is later killed by Dr. Jekyll. He later confronts Rumplestiltskin about the incident and makes his way to the Land of Untold Stories. Years later in the Land of Untold Stories, Hyde steals the Pandora's Box containing Belle and her unborn child from Gold by using the Apprentice's Wand after he is told the Dark One has found love. After he is separated from Dr. Jekyll, Mr. Hyde makes a deal with Gold telling him where to travel to find a way to free Belle from her sleeping curse. In return, he travels to Storybrooke with his fellow Land of Untold Stories inhabitants. After a dirigible from the Land of Untold Stories arrives, Dr. Jekyll, David and Regina were able to subdue Mr. Hyde with special shackles despite Emma having some hand tremors at the time. While locked up in the psychiatric ward of the Storybrooke Hospital, Mr. Hyde states that Emma should follow a red bird if she wants to find the answers to her hand tremors. He is later freed by the Serum Evil Queen. When Hook kills Dr. Jekyll, he also dies as he is Dr. Jekyll's alter ego.
- Gideon (seasons 6–7) portrayed by Giles Matthey and Anton Starkman, is the son of Rumplestiltskin and Belle, half-brother of Baelfire, and grandson of Malcolm and Fiona. Kidnapped by the Black Fairy upon birth in Storybrooke, he is brought to the Dark Realm. Due to the time difference, he grows a full 28 years and is forced to return to Storybrooke when the Black Fairy rips his heart and controls it. In Storybrooke, he manipulates events to open a portal from the Dark Realm to bring over the Black Fairy, something which he successfully does with the blood of Emma. During the Black Fairy's curse, he is led into thinking that his mother left him and his father and is later commanded by the Black Fairy to kill Emma. As the two duel, Emma is struck, and Gideon disappears, turning back into a baby for Mr. Gold and Belle to have a second chance in raising him. During a victorious dinner at Granny's Diner, Belle and Mr. Gold bring Gideon to join the others. Eventually, after his first birthday, he is taken to various worlds by Mr. Gold and Belle. In one of those worlds, Gideon gets accepted into Elphame Academy and bids farewell to his parents to attend his lessons. While his parents spend time in the Edge of Realms, Gideon occasionally visits them, with each time, Belle is older than before due to the time difference in that world. After Belle dies, Gideon visits her grave with his father to say his goodbyes to her.
- Aladdin (season 6) portrayed by Deniz Akdeniz, is a thief and the Savior before Emma Swan. As a thief, Aladdin is hired by Princess Jasmine to locate the Diamond in the Rough at the Cave of Wonders, but Jasmine afterward reveals that she had been looking for Aladdin as the Savior of Agrabah. When the Capital Palace is attacked by Jafar, Aladdin saves the Sultan and Jasmine by breaking Jafar's staff. After Jafar escapes, Aladdin hunts him down, but is gifted a pair of scissors which can cut his fate of being the Savior, which Aladdin uses. Knowing that Jasmine is looking for him to save Agrabah, Aladdin retreats to the Enchanted Forest and is swept by the Dark Curse to the Land Without Magic. Years later, Emma finds Aladdin in an underground cemetery. He gives her the scissors as a backup plan for her as she is the current Savior. He then reunites with Princess Jasmine and becomes a genie to help locate Agrabah's whereabouts. However, he is captured by the Evil Queen and becomes her slave. When she is temporarily defeated, Aladdin is freed. Together with Jasmine, they return to the Enchanted Forest to locate Agrabah. With help from Hook and Ariel, they find Jafar's genie lamp and discover that Agrabah is inside the Crown Jewel. After freeing their realm, Aladdin rules Agrabah with Jasmine but is threatened with the Black Fairy's curse, which destroys all of Agrabah, forcing Aladdin, Jasmine, and a few of their citizens to retreat back to the Enchanted Forest. After the curse is lifted and all the realms are restored, Aladdin and Jasmine return home.
- Princess Jasmine/Shirin (season 6) portrayed by Karen David, is the daughter of the Sultan of Agrabah, and Aladdin's lover. When Jafar began residing at the Capital of Agrabah, she tries to get Aladdin to help her free the realm from his tyranny. However, Aladdin frees himself from his savior state and Jafar entraps the capital into a jewel, forcing Jasmine to retreat to the Land of Untold Stories. Thirty years later, ending up in Storybrooke, she reunites with Aladdin and continues their mission to save their home. Confronting Jafar, now a genie, they get the upper hand and kills him, restoring the capital. During the Black Fairy's curse, Jasmine helps Snow locate David with her magic carpet. After the curse is lifted and all the realms are restored, she and Aladdin return home.
- Fiona/Black Fairy (season 6) portrayed by Jaime Murray, is the former lover of Malcolm, mother of Rumplestiltskin, grandmother of Baelfire and Gideon, great-grandmother of Henry Mills, and great-great-grandmother of Lucy. With Malcolm, Fiona gives birth to a son, but grows obsessed in protecting him after his fairy godmother, Tiger Lily, reveals that her son is destined to die as the Savior in the far future. She tricks Tiger Lily into breaking into the Sacred Vault of the Fairies to create a curse to banish all the children of their land to the Land Without Magic, however, the Blue Fairy banishes her to the Dark Realm where she becomes the cruel Black Fairy and kidnaps children from various realms and forces them to mine dark fairy dust. About 30 years later, the Black Fairy arrives in Storybrooke after the birth of her grandson, Gideon, and kidnaps him to the Dark Realm and raises him. After 28 years, according to the time in the Dark Realm, the Black Fairy rips his heart out and commands him to return to Storybrooke to kill the Savior. Since then, the Black Fairy has been manipulating events from her domain and eventually frees herself from the Dark Realm with Gideon's help. She arrives in Storybrooke and prepares for the final battle between her and Emma, and eventually casting the curse to separate Emma's love ones before the battle. The curse reverts Storybrooke back to its original self during the first curse and sets off the destruction of all the realms, however, after Mr. Gold kills her, her curse comes to an end.
- Tiger Lily (seasons 6–7) portrayed by Sara Tomko, is a fairy. After the birth of Fiona's son, Tiger Lily and the Blue Fairy visit Fiona and Tiger Lily is revealed as the child's fairy godmother. Later on, after Fiona learned of her son's fate as the Savior, Tiger Lily helps her to find the child destined to kill Fiona's son in the far future. Breaking into the Sacred Vault of the Fairies, Tiger Lily is tricked by Fiona, who intends to create a curse to banish all the children of their land to the Land Without Magic. With the Blue Fairy's help, Fiona is banished to the Dark Realm, and Tiger Lily and the Blue Fairy reveal Fiona's fate to her husband, Malcolm. Since then, Tiger Lily removes her fairy status and relocates to Neverland. Years later, she comes across Captain Hook and teams up with him to send word to the current savior, Emma, that Fiona, now known as the Black Fairy, intends to kill her during the Final Battle. Tiger Lily helps Hook escape from the Lost Boys into a portal back to Storybrooke. Tiger Lily eventually regains her fairy status and helps Henry and his daughter Lucy in the far future to locate a magical wardrobe in the New Enchanted Forest. After Henry is captured by the Coven of the Eight, Tiger Lily brings Lucy to her mother at Tiana's palace.
- Drizella Tremaine/Ivy Belfrey (season 7) portrayed by Adelaide Kane, Anna Cathcart, and Lula Mae Melench, is the daughter of Marcus and Rapunzel Tremaine, sister of Anastasia, step-daughter of Cecelia, step-sister of Ella, and step-aunt of Lucy. As a child, Drizella had a strong bond with her sister, promising to always be there for one another. After her mother's disappearance, Drizella loses hope on ever reuniting with her and replaces Cecelia as her motherly figure, despite Rapunzel's return six years later. Drizella refuses to acknowledge Rapunzel as her mother, and after Anastasia's death, her mother began despising her. Drizella, hoping to make her mother suffer, joins the Coven of the Eight and together with Gothel and six other witches, cast the Dark Curse which sends everyone to the Land Without Magic. In Hyperion Heights, she is Ivy Belfrey, an assistant to her mother Victoria at Belfrey Towers. Ivy pretends that her memories are wiped by the curse as a ploy to make her mother believe that she is in-charge. Ivy works alongside Eloise and gets Victoria arrested in-order to make her suffer. However, Eloise betrays her and entraps both Victoria and herself at the bottom of a well. When her mother sacrifices herself to save her, Ivy begins to realize her wrongdoings and makes amends with Henry, Jacinda, and Roni. She then saves Anastasia from Eloise and Mr. Samdi. After making amends, Ivy and Anastasia use a magic bean to return to the New Enchanted Forest.
- Alice Jones/Tilly (season 7) portrayed by Rose Reynolds, is the daughter of Hook and Gothel and Robin's fiancée. Born in a tower, Alice is used by Gothel to escape the tower, replacing Alice as its prisoner. Hoping to not abandon her, Hook stays behind to take care of her. However, Gothel separates them with the Curse of the Poisoned Heart. Eventually, a giant troll frees Alice from the tower on her 17th birthday. Her freedom leads to a romantic relationship with Robin after crossing paths with her. When the Dark Curse is cast, Alice is sent to the Land Without Magic. In Hyperion Heights, she is Tilly, who works with Detective Weaver and frequents the statue site that the Troll became. Tilly is forced into taking pills, which prevents her from remembering her past life. Once, when she refuses, she remembers Rumplestiltskin and shoots Detective Weaver. She later becomes a suspect in the murders of Dr. Sage and Hilda, but Detective Rogers proved that she had an alibi and was being framed. Gothel later orchestrated events that would bring Tilly to the Coven of Eights. During the final battle with Gothel where Henry's kiss on an unconscious Roni breaks the spell, Tilly regains her memory and turns Gothel into a tree. While apologizing to Gothel for her action, Tilly grows Lupinus pilosus at the base of the tree. Afterwards, she and Margot embrace each other. Eventually with Rogers' blessing, Robin proposes to her and after the creation of the United Realms, they both attend Regina's coronation.
- Anastasia Tremaine (season 7) portrayed by Yael Yurman and Sophia Reid-Gant, is the daughter of Marcus and Rapunzel Tremaine, sister of Drizella, step-daughter of Cecelia, and step-sister of Ella. Despite her mother's disappearance, Anastasia refuses to give up hope, unlike Drizella. After six years, Anastasia lures her mother back by using lanterns, an idea Drizella gave. However, one winter, Anastasia falls into thin ice along with Ella. As Marcus dove in to rescue Ella first, Anastasia was at the brink of death. Rapunzel brings her to Gothel, who preserves her last breath until she can be awoken. Her mother places her in a coffin and vows to do what it takes to awake her. When the Dark Curse is cast, Anastasia and her coffin are sent to the Land Without Magic. In Hyperion Heights, she is awaken by Victoria but is manipulated by Eloise, who plans to use Anastasia's guardian powers for her own means. She is saved by Ivy, and together they return to the New Enchanted Forest.
- Mother Gothel/Eloise Gardener/Mother Nature (season 7) portrayed by Emma Booth, is the daughter of Flora (a.k.a.) and the mother of Alice. As a tree nymph in the Land Without Magic, Gothel befriends a group of human women. However, they betray her and slaughter her family, with Gothel inheriting her mother's title of Mother Nature. Angered with mankind, Gothel and Seraphina wipe the realm clean and escape to New Fairy Tale Land where she forms the Coven of the Eight with hopes of returning to the Land Without Magic to reclaim the realm. Gothel also sexually assaults Hook, resulting in the birth of Alice. Eventually, pawning Drizella, the Dark Curse is cast, returning Gothel to the Land Without Magic. In Hyperion Heights, Gothel ends up as a prisoner of Victoria Belfrey as Eloise Gardener and maintains her memories. With help from Ivy and a tricked Detective Rogers, Eloise escapes Victoria and begins her plot to reclaim the Land Without Magic from the humans. She also seeks out the Guardian's magic. Eventually reforming her coven and purging the realm, the destruction stops after the curse breaks and Gothel is turned into a tree by Alice.
- Dr. Facilier/Mr. Baron Samdi (season 7) portrayed by Daniel Francis, is a voodoo magician who has a history with the Evil Queen. His intentions with Tiana's family is never clear, but he tries to bring fear by threatening Tiana on her coronation day and later keeping Prince Naveen apart from her. When the curse is cast, he becomes Mr. Baron Samdi and for an unclear reason, wants the Dark One's dagger. However, he is later killed by the Wish Realm version of Rumplestiltskin.
- Hansel/Jack/Nick Branson (season 7) portrayed by Nathan Parsons and Seth Isaac Johnson, is the son of Ivo and brother of Gretel. As a child, he and his sister were kidnapped by a Witch who wanted to eat them. He also sees Zelena as a wicked witch and harbors a grudge against witches. After his sister's death, he assumes the identity of Jack to hunt down the witches. Once the curse is cast and he is awaken by Mr. Samdi, he continues his witch hunt. But he is arrested and then killed by Mr. Samdi as collateral damage.
- Robin Hood/Margot (season 7) portrayed by Tiera Skovbye, is the daughter of Robin and Zelena, half-sister of Roland, and Alice's fiancée. Robin is born out of wedlock because of Zelena's trickery towards Robin Hood. As a baby, Zelena raises her in Storybrooke after the town once again found peace after the Final Battle was won. Shortly afterward, Robin is brought to the New Enchanted Forest, where due to the time difference, grows into a 25-year-old woman who specializes in archery. She also engages in a relationship with Alice. After the Dark Curse is cast, Robin ends up in the Land Without Magic. In Hyperion Heights, Robin is now Margot and is Kelly's daughter. However, she goes to Amsterdam with tickets from Roni. She afterward ends up in Phuket for a foam party and never returns home. She eventually comes back to Hyperion Heights and reconnects with her mother. She unknowingly re-meets her lover Alice and they continue their relationship. Once the curse breaks, they're reunited. With Rogers' blessing, Robin proposes to Alice and after the creation of the United Realms, they attend Regina's coronation.
- Prince Naveen/Drew (season 7) portrayed by Jeff Pierre, is the Prince of Maldonia. After his brother died from an alligator attack, Prince Naveen tracks the beast from Maldonia to the New Enchanted Forest. He teams up with Princess Tiana to kill it, but due to a misunderstanding, he is attacked by the alligator. Once it's dead, Tiana brings him to Dr. Facilier, who fixes Naveen but send some him someplace hard to reach until he can pay is debt. Eventually, Naveen is sent to the Land Without Magic after the Dark Curse is cast. In Hyperion Heights, he is Drew, a food truck operator and forced to do Mr. Samdi's bidding. After the curse breaks, he reunites with Tiana.
- Edwin (Wonderland) portrayed by Shaun Smyth, is the husband to his second wife Sarah and father to Alice and Millie. In Victorian England, he is briefly seen when a young Alice returns from Wonderland. He is saddened of his wife's death and Alice's disappearance. While Alice is in Wonderland, Edwin remarries to a woman named Sarah and they have a daughter named Millie. When Alice returns from Wonderland, Edwin reveals to her that as she had been gone for so long, everyone assumed she was dead. He does not believe that Alice is lying, though Dr. Lydgate tells him that his daughter is delusional. After hearing that Alice had escaped from Bethlem Asylum, he is visited by Jafar under the alias of Dr. Sheffield. He takes Edwin to Wonderland, keeping him prisoner in his tower and posing as him to reconnect and gain sympathy from Alice. Jafar eventually brings Edwin before Alice, threatening to throw him into the sea to force Alice to use another of her wishes. Alice originally declines and Edwin is thrown to his doom, only to be returned to England as Alice uses her second wish to return her father back to his home. Edwin is unsure if he is delusional of the visit or if it was real. Following Jafar's defeat, he is seen welcoming Cyrus to the family as he and Alice are married in London.
- The Caterpillar (seasons 1, 6, Wonderland) voiced by Roger Daltrey and Iggy Pop, is an inhabitant of Wonderland who resides on a mushroom where he is always smoking. The Caterpillar is the boss of a group of warriors called Collectors who are sent to collect the debts to the Caterpillar from anyone. The Knave of Hearts is in debt to the Caterpillar. Cyrus once traded his compass to the Caterpillar in exchange for an invisible tent at the edge of the Outlands. Sometime later, when Jefferson and the Evil Queen comes to Wonderland, they are greeted by the Caterpillar. Years later, when the Knave of Hearts and Alice travel to Underland to take possession of the Forget-Me-Knot, the Caterpillar accepts the Knave's deal of obtaining the item from the Grendel for him, in exchange that the Caterpillar erases his debt. The Knave instead keeps the Forget-Me-Knot to help Alice on their quest to find Cyrus. Jafar later visits the Caterpillar so that he can tell him about the Knave of Hearts. When in the presence of Jafar, Caterpillar tells him about the Jabberwocky and where she was imprisoned. Cyrus later visits the Caterpillar to get his compass back.
- The Sultan of Lower Agrabah (Wonderland) portrayed by Brian George and Amir Arison, is the father of Mirza and Jafar and ruler of a kingdom in Agrabah. In Agrabah, Jafar is brought to the Sultan for theft. Before enacting the punishment upon Jafar, he notices a ring on Jafar's hand, learning that Jafar is his bastard son. Finding out that Jafar's mother is dead, he makes Jafar work at the Palace as a servant but never acknowledging him as his son. One day, during a diplomatic meeting, Jafar over speaks when the Sultan's son, Prince Mirza, couldn't answer a question. Later, the Sultan makes Mirza slap Jafar for overstepping. The Sultan eventually drowns and kills Jafar, although Jafar is later revived. As an adult, Jafar kills Mirza and imprisons the Sultan. Years later, the Sultan appears as an old prisoner in a cage of Jafar's tower on a floating island. When the genie Cyrus makes his escape and offers to have the ex-Sultan accompany him, he declines claiming he would only slow Cyrus down. Jafar later visits his father, telling him that once Alice uses her final wish, he will control the laws of magic, thus forcing his father to acknowledge him as his son. Regretting that he had not killed Jafar when he had the chance, the ex-Sultan purposely falls into the pit that his cage hangs over. Though Jafar spares him upon having his magic carpet catch him so that he can witness his final move on Alice. During Alice's raid on the palace, she managed to free the Sultan. When Jafar attains great magical power, he makes his father feel true love for him. The Sultan is happy to have Jafar as his son, but it turns out that Jafar only wants him to feel this way so the Sultan knows what it's like to have someone who loves him kill him and drowns the Sultan with magic by making water appear within him.
- Elizabeth (Wonderland) portrayed by Lauren McKnight, is a young woman who is one of the Caterpillar's Collectors. Alice meets her upon attempting to locate the Knave of Hearts after the two split up. She tells Alice that she and the Knave were great friends in his earlier days, assisting him with many battles in Wonderland. She also reveals of his love for Anastasia, and this being the real reason that he escaped Wonderland....to forget her abandonment of him. Lizard later attempts to help Alice rescue the Knave, though she is knocked out by Jafar. She does regain consciousness where she sees Anastasia looking at the Knave's petrified form. Later after bathing in the river, Elizabeth finds Cyrus' lamp where the Knave of Hearts is now residing. She does make some wishes which improves a nearby town. Elizabeth then admits to the Knave of Hearts that she has feelings for him. After unwittingly making her third wish for the Knave of Hearts to feel something for her, Elizabeth falls dead. The Jabberwocky later finds Elizabeth's dead body and takes her eyes so that Jafar can track down Cyrus' lamp.
- Amara (Wonderland) portrayed by Zuleikha Robinson, is the mother of Taj, Cyrus and Rafi. She is a powerful healer and sorceress who is feared amongst the residents of Agrabah. After Amara was badly injured in a house fire, her sons steals the healing waters of the Well of Wonders to cure her, but her sons are turned into genies by Nyx, the guardian of the well and are scattered across Agrabah. Since then, she became a powerful sorcerer in Agrabah in a bit to find her sons. She is approached by Jafar who wishes to learn magic from her to enact revenge on the Sultan. Years later, after much training, she gets involved in a romantic relationship with Jafar. Eventually, she tells Jafar on changing the laws of magic which requires the power of three genies but leaves out details of the genies origin, being her sons. After helping Jafar to retrieve two of the bottles, she is eventually betrayed by him after Jafar pins the final bottle's whereabout. Jafar poisons her and turns her into a serpent staff which he uses to channel her magic and uses it to his wish. As a staff, she is briefly destroyed by Aladdin after he snapped the staff into half but eventually restored by Jafar. Many years later, the Jabberwocky helps Alice and Cyrus turn Amara back to human form to fight against Jafar in Wonderland. In the fight, Cyrus is brutally injured, leaving Amara with no choice but to join forces with Jafar to change the laws of magic. Amara then escapes with Cyrus and Alice on a magic carpet to the White Rabbit's house where she heals Cyrus. She later joins Cyrus on their trip to the Well of Wonders to return the stolen water to Nyx to break the genie curse. Amara sacrifices herself to Nyx, causing her to turn into a pool of water. Despite Jafar's interference, the water is eventually returned to Nyx.
- The Jabberwocky (Wonderland) portrayed by Peta Sergeant, is an ancient human-like creature who can enter the minds of anyone. In Wonderland, she is stronger than an entire army and it took one army to imprison her with a blade in her chest. Many years later, she is freed by Jafar who requires her help. After finding Elizabeth's dead body, she takes her eyes for Jafar to locate the third genie's lamp. Learning that the Red Queen has it, the Jabberwocky hunts down the Red Queen and steals the bottle from her. She brings the Red Queen to Jafar as a prisoner and later taunts the Red Queen on her past history, as requested by Jafar. Eventually, the Jabberwocky successfully makes the Red Queen use all of her wishes. Later, after Jafar changed the laws of magic, he uses the Vorpal Blade to pin the Jabberwocky to the dungeon walls upon her serving her purpose. The Jabberwocky is later freed.
