= Only You (Once Upon a Time) =

- Once Upon a Time episode
- Episode no.: Season 5 Episode 22
- Directed by: Romeo Tirone
- Written by: David H. Goodman & Andrew Chambliss
- Production code: 522
- Original air date: May 15, 2016

Guest appearances
- Lee Arenberg as Grumpy/Leroy; Beverley Elliott as Widow Lucas/Granny; Hank Harris as The Groundsman/Dr. Jekyll; Sam Witwer as The Warden; Amy Manson as Merida; Arnold Pinnock as the Orderly/Mr. Poole; Olivia Steele-Falconer as Violet

Episode chronology
← Previous "Last Rites"	Next → "An Untold Story"
- Once Upon a Time season 5

"Only You" is the twenty-second episode of the fifth season of the American fantasy drama series Once Upon a Time and the first part of the show's fifth-season finale, which aired on May 15, 2016.

In this episode, Henry and Violet leave Storybrooke to destroy magic, so Emma, Regina, and Mr. Gold go after them. Meanwhile, Snow, David, Hook, and Zelena find themselves in a strange new land.

== Plot ==
=== Opening sequence ===
The title logo is attached to a flying dirigible.

=== Event chronology ===
The Storybrooke and Land Without Magic events take place after "Last Rites". The Land of Untold Stories events take place before "An Untold Story".

=== In Storybrooke ===
At Granny's, Regina is in mourning during a wake for Robin. Snow and David are ready to console Regina and even Zelena is ready to reach out each other in the wake of her loss to Hades. Violet also pays respects to Robin as she tells Henry she was worried about him while he was in the Underworld. At the Clock tower, Gold is looking for another way to wake up Belle, and begins to look at the Olympian crystal, which he'll use to tether all the magic from Storybrooke. Gold holds the crystal and it glows. Back at the Diner, Emma wants to talk to Regina but suddenly they hear a noise, and witnesses a series of beams shooting outside from the Olympian crystal. All of a sudden Hook shows up as Emma tells Regina about his return. Realizing that Gold is behind it, everyone traces the disturbance to the tower; Emma and Regina figure out that Gold couldn't wake Belle with True Love's kiss since she doesn't love him anymore, so he stole Storybrooke's magic as part of a plan to wake her. Emma tells Regina to let her and the others handle this one, leading to the two bickering until Henry stops them, but after Regina disappears, Emma tells Henry to leave as well, only to meet up with Violet at the pawnshop. Henry is upset over how magic has destroyed his family and sees it as bad, so he comes up with a solution by creating a plan called “Operation Mixtape.” Utilizing his role as the Author, Henry uses the quill to writes himself as the possessor of the crystal, and suddenly, it appears in his hand. He sends both mothers a text, detailing his plans.

When Gold tells the others that Henry has taken the crystal, he tells them that Henry could destroy all magic and with it, Storybrooke. Emma notes she placed a GPS app on Henry’s phone to find him, but Henry had the phone left behind on the bus on purpose. At the same time, Zelena uses the Apprentice's wand and creates a portal door to return Merida and the Camelot residents home, and also sends the Merry Men back to the Sherwood Forest for Roland to grow up there, in case magic does get destroyed. Unfortunately, the portal becomes too strong that it dragged Zelena, Snow, David, and Hook into it because of the magic tied to the crystal. The portal closes and vanishes in thin air.

=== In Boston ===
Regina and Emma are looking for Henry and Violet in Boston, but they have lost the tracker because Henry left his phone on the bus, as he knew Emma placed the GPS tracker app on it. After she shows the lady the picture of Henry on her phone, Regina grabs Henry's phone and throws it in the trash. Suddenly, Regina's anger lights the trash on fire, and Emma makes it go away. They discover that magic now works outside of Storybrooke, as Henry has taken the crystal and the magic. Regina then uses a needle on Emma's bloody finger on the map where to find Henry and Violet, leading them to New York City.

=== In New York City ===
In New York City, it's discovered that Henry and Violet have already arrived, as Emma’s blood traced them to Henry, but it also leads Gold to his whereabouts. Henry tells Violet that his father Neal was trying to destroy magic before he died, so they make plans to find his journal. Moments later, Regina and Emma shows up at Neal's apartment, and Regina encounters an old letter from Robin addressed to her, reminding her that she will always be the brave heroine with whom he fell in love with. Regina admits to Emma that she will never be at peace with herself as she wondered should she become the Evil Queen again because she feels cursed and will never find redemption, realizing that the more good that she does, the more people she loses. Both are unaware that Gold was listening to their conversation.

At the library, Henry and Violet look for more answers and Henry finds multiple "Once Upon a Time" storybooks containing different stories. Violet then sees a black duplicate of the Holy Grail, which was said to hold all magic. Henry breaks the glass, steals the item and stashes it in his bag, after seeing that it is capable of sapping magic from the Olympian Crystal. Gold then catches up with them, puts them both to sleep and leaves with the crystal. Emma and Regina later find Henry and Violet, but Henry leaves out the part about finding the Holy Grail. Regina uses a needle on Henry's finger to find out whether Gold is still in the city, but the magic doesn't work, as Gold had already stripped them of their magic. Gold checks in at a hotel and prepares to wake Belle, but later loses the Underworld Pandora's Box that contains Belle through a portal that opened in his hotel room.

=== In the Land of Untold Stories ===
Zelena, Snow, David, and Hook soon find themselves in a new realm, but Zelena has no way to return as her wand broke upon arrival. The four come across a frightened groundsman who warns them they shouldn’t be there, only to have another man appear and use magic to knock the unwanted visitors out. Hours later, they wake up in a cage of enchanted bars and are greeted by the warden, who believes that the Dark One must have sent them; they are enemies. They convince the warden that Gold is their enemy as well, and their arrival was an accident on his part in trying to wake Belle; however, the warden keeps them prisoner anyhow. The groundsman then visits the four, and agrees to help them if they will take him to Storybrooke.

After Zelena gives the groundsman her broken wand to repair, the orderly, Poole, finds him and takes Zelena's wand, then pours a blue potion down his throat which turns him into the warden himself. It turns out that the groundsman is actually Dr. Jekyll, and the warden is Mr. Hyde. He creates a portal using the wand, and pulls Pandora's Box from New York City, thus throwing a wrench into Gold's plans to free Belle from the sleeping curse. Hyde plans to blackmail Gold to cooperate with him if he ever wants to see Belle again.

== Cultural references ==
- The title for this episode is named after the song by Yazoo which has been previously featured in "The Price" and "Dreamcatcher".
- This episode introduces Dr. Jekyll, Mr. Hyde and Poole from The Strange Case of Dr. Jekyll & Mr. Hyde.
- The items Henry showed to Violet at Gold's Pawn Shop include Geppetto's parents transformed into puppets, needles for the sleeping curse and a snow globe.

== Reception ==
Andrea Towers of Entertainment Weekly gave it a good review: "It’s been a whirlwind of a year on Once Upon A Time. We’ve traveled to the Underworld and back; we’ve lost heroes...and everyone knows by now that a season finale usually ends with the introduction to a new world or a new set of heroes. After almost six years, what can Once offer that’s new and different in the world of fairytales?"

In a review from Rickey.org, Nick Roman said, "Last week, I was pretty miffed about Once Upon A Time and its treatment of Regina (Lana Parrilla). While I ultimately liked the episode, it felt like the show was continuing to use her as a punching bag to move the plot forward. Need something bad to happen to one of our characters? Just take it out on Regina! Granted, it’s a formula that has served Once Upon A Time in the past, but at this point, it just felt repetitive. That’s why “Only You” and “An Untold Story” provided such a fresh change of pace for a season finale that not only sets up the next phase of the story, but also promises to put Regina in a more central role."

Amy Ratcliffe of IGN said of the episode, "Once Upon a Time's trend of setting up the next season in the finale continued with the final installments of Season 5. Regina thankfully didn't go back to her Evil Queen ways and they, in fact, put a fresh spin on her turmoil and tied it nicely to the Jekyll/Hyde mythology. The only hiccup – and it was a big one – was Henry's all over the map behavior that caused all sorts of action. Two jam-packed episodes after a somewhat sleepy half season in the Underworld was jarring and made you realize how much story the show can churn through when it's not stretching out a "themed" plot." Ratcliffe gave the episode a 7.9 rating out of 10.

Gwen Ihnat of The A.V. Club gave the episode a good review, giving it a B overall. In her recap: "There are two competing themes in this Once Upon A Time double-episode finale, and one is leagues more successful than the other. Just when you get the feeling that OUAT can do little else but beat a dead horse forever (Hades’ blue hair! The River Of Lost Souls!), it pulls out actual insight about the duplicitousness of personality, handily personified by Dr. Jekyll and Mr. Hyde, as well as the Evil Queen herself, Regina."

Christine Orlando of TV Fanatic gave the episode a 4.5 out of 5.
