= Nimue (Once Upon a Time) =

- Once Upon a Time episode
- Episode no.: Season 5 Episode 7
- Directed by: Romeo Tirone
- Written by: Jane Espenson
- Production code: 507
- Original air date: November 8, 2015

Guest appearances
- Beverley Elliott as Granny / Widow Lucas; Caroline Ford as Nimue / Dark One; Liam Garrigan as King Arthur; Elliot Knight as Merlin; Joana Metrass as Queen Guinevere; Darren Moore as Vortigan; Graham Verchere as young apprentice

Episode chronology
← Previous "The Bear and the Bow"	Next → "Birth"
- Once Upon a Time season 5

"Nimue" is the seventh episode of the fifth season of the American fantasy drama series Once Upon a Time, which aired on November 8, 2015.

In this episode, Merlin helps Emma, while Regina, Mary Margaret, David, Hook, and Robin are tricked by Zelena. In Camelot's past, Merlin falls in love with the woman who becomes the first Dark One.

== Plot ==
=== Opening sequence ===
Middlemist flowers are scattered in the forest.

=== Event chronology ===
The first Camelot flashback about Merlin take place 1,000 years before Arthur becomes king in "The Broken Kingdom" and the rest of Camelot flashbacks about Merlin take place 500 years later, before "Dreamcatcher" and 533 years before Emma comes to Camelot in "The Dark Swan". The Enchanted Forest flashbacks with Merlin and Nimue at the site of the Flame of Prometheus take place before the scene with Zoso and the Apprentice in "The Apprentice". The Enchanted Forest events take place after "The Bear and the Bow". The Storybrooke events take place after "The Bear and the Bow".

=== In the Characters' Past ===
1,000 years before "the Age of Arthur" (approximately 1,033 years before the Present Day), (Note: In "Episode 88: Operation Mongoose Part 2", the Apprentice said that Merlin had fought the first Dark One for some time (at least a few decades). In "Episode 94: The Bear and the Bow", Merlin said that he was trapped as a tree for several hundred years. In "Episode 95: Nimue", Merlin told Nimue that he drank from the Holy Grail 500 years before he met her.) Merlin and a friend, Adda, were deserters from an army and were trekking through a desert, desperate for water. Merlin saw a light and ran after it, revealed to be the Holy Grail, on top of a stone. Thinking that it was sacred, Merlin initially refuses to touch it, but his friend, Adda, disregards his warnings and decides to drink from it anyway. When his friend grabbed it, he turned to ashes. Merlin then grabbed the grail after praying to the gods for permission, and was able to drink from it. When he put his hand down, he realized he had magic. The desert was no more — only lush greenery and forests. 500 years later, Merlin is at a village healing people, where his apprentice informs him of a woman who escaped a burning village. Merlin meets the woman, who introduces herself as Nimue. She wants revenge on Vortigan, the masked man responsible. She also had Middlemist flowers to offer, as their survival will guarantee a form of revenge. Merlin agrees to help her and places the seeds in a planter, and he uses his magic to grow them instantly. Over the course of the next several months, they fall in love, and Merlin reveals the truth about the Grail and how he acquired magic. He expresses a wish to reforge the grail into a sword that can destroy his immortality, so that he can live a normal mortal life with Nimue as his wife. However, as they start their quest, it turns out that Vortigan has been watching them.

Nimue takes Merlin to her burnt village, Oxleigh, where they learn that Vortigan has been after the Holy Grail. They trek to the Flame of Prometheus, where Merlin uses a portion of the flame to reforge the Grail into Excalibur. Vortigan followed them in his quest for the Grail, and when he sees Excalibur, he attacks Nimue, apparently killing her, before taking Excalibur for himself. Merlin believes Nimue to be dead, and is racked by grief as Vortigan turns to him. Unexpectedly, at this point, a healthy Nimue rips out Vortigan's heart and reveals that she had drunk from the Holy Grail, desiring power and immortality like Merlin's, and thirsty for vengeance against Vortigan. Despite Merlin's pleas and warning, Nimue crushes Vortigan's heart, killing him. This allows the darkness from within Vortigan's heart to infect her, transforming Nimue into the very first "Dark One". The Promethean Flame is extinguished to an ember, and Nimue goes on to shatter Excalibur into two pieces, in order to prevent Merlin from ending the immortality of both of them. Then, Nimue apologizes to him for her actions, but Merlin says no, that he is the one who is sorry.

=== In the Enchanted Forest and Camelot ===
Three weeks before the Present, Hook thinks that Merlin is not helping Emma at all, as Hook sees her making Dreamcatchers instead of sleeping now (she cannot sleep and is making dreamcatchers instead; Dark Ones do not need sleep). But Merlin tells Hook that he is doing his best to help her, as he knows what it means to lose a loved one to the Dark One. Merlin tells the residents they need to acquire Excalibur from Arthur, while he takes Emma with him to the site of the Promethean Flame to acquire the spark needed to reunite Excalibur's halves. Before they go on their mission, Hook gives Emma a necklace with a ring as reminder of their love, and as a keepsake. As Emma embarks on this quest, Merlin tells her that the quest will force her to choose between the light and darkness, which could have dire consequences for the two of them. As they reached the ruins of Oxleigh, the site of the Flame, Merlin had brought the dagger with him and gives it to Emma, in order for her to summon the oldest and darkest of the Dark Ones to obtain the Spark. As Emma looked into the dagger, its display rolls back the names of the previous Dark Ones, until they saw Nimue, who appeared to them, as she was the original Dark One. Then Nimue attacks Merlin through Emma. Nimue forces Emma's hand to choke Merlin's throat, with Nimue telling her to finish him off. Nimue urges Emma to kill Merlin, telling her that Merlin wants to destroy them and make her go back to being powerless, while Merlin counters by telling Emma to fight the darkness and to "let the light win." However, Emma fights it off by telling Nimue, "I’m not nothing! I was never nothing! The power you have I don’t need!" Then, she uses the Dagger to scroll back to her name, giving her control of Nimue, before removing the Promethean Spark from Nimue's chest. However, Nimue warns Emma that it isn't over yet, that the reforged Excalibur "has more than one purpose," and adds that she is still inside her head, before disappearing.

Meanwhile, the residents are coming up with plans to get into the castle and steal Excalibur, but Zelena already knew a way in, having studied the place, on the condition that her powers were restored. As Regina, Hook, David, and Robin sneak their way into the castle, Regina asked Mary Margaret to watch Zelena, with her cuff still on. At the same time, Arthur had other plans for the residents, as he showed Guinevere a potion that melts anything that it touches. It also turns out that Zelena had double crossed her fellow Storybrookers by tricking Mary Margaret with fake contractions, before knocking her out and tying her up. When they reached the Round Table, Regina freezes Arthur, and they are ready to take the sword from Arthur, only to discover that Zelena was working with Arthur and tethered Merlin to Excalibur, which now bears an inscription of his name. (This spell introduced Dark Magic into Merlin's body.) Despite David's pleas, Arthur uses the sword to summon Merlin. As Merlin and Emma are returning to Camelot, Emma discovers that Merlin is missing, even as he appears in front of Arthur. Arthur forces Merlin to disarm the others, but Merlin informs him that Emma had passed her test, and that he had what he needed to unite Excalibur. However, Arthur refuses to give Merlin the sword, in hopes of obtaining more glory, before ordering Merlin to make the "intruders" disappear.

=== In Storybrooke ===
In the basement, Emma has both the dagger and the sword, as the manifestations of both Rumplstiltskin, Nimue, and previous Dark Ones appear. She then uses the Promethean Spark she took from Nimue and fuses the dagger and the Excalibur fragment together, making the sword whole once again. Despite remembering Merlin's warning not to touch Excalibur, Emma gives in to the temptation from Nimue and the other Dark One manifestations to "take the power," and she takes control of the sword, cementing her title as the most powerful Dark One ever.

== Production ==
Jared S. Gilmore and Emile de Ravin were listed in the credits but were not featured in this episode.

== Reception ==
=== Reviews ===
The episode received excellent reviews.

Andrea Towers of Entertainment Weekly notes in her assessment of the review, "The moral of tonight’s Once Upon A Time might be, “Don’t play with fire.” Or perhaps it's, “Don’t trust the man behind the curtain.” In any case, Excalibur lives! And unfortunately, so does Dark One Emma — now even more powerful and ruthless than before. For the first time since the beginning of the season, we barely spent any time in present-day Storybrooke, save for the first and last few moments of the episode. With two halves of the sword now in her possession, Emma can only see power. But Dark One Rumple claims it represents more than that — like any fairytale, it represents history. And it's time for Excalibur's promise, given years ago, to be fulfilled."

In a review from Rickey.org, Nick Roman said, "Once Upon A Time served up a compelling story with “Nimue”. Granted, Merlin wasn't the most fascinating character going into tonight's show, but he's far more interesting coming out of it. I'm interested to see how his character evolves, and if it evolves. I'm also far more compelled by Emma's commitment to darkness, and whether or not it's one big misdirect. After all, Emma has a new opponent in the form of the newly-heroic Rumplestiltskin. That's going to be a showdown for the ages, I'd wager. Can't wait."

Amy Ratcliffe of IGN said of the episode, "It was obvious Nimue was going to be revealed as the first Dark One so they may as well have had Merlin say it instead of having him pull an Obi-Wan. That aside, this detour into Merlin's backstory gave greater depth to events in the present. His close ties to the Dark One make his interactions with Emma more meaningful. A hint of what turned Emma bad would have made the last scene with Excalibur more chilling though." Ratcliffe gave the episode a 7.8 rating out of 10.

Gwen Ihnat of The A.V. Club gave the episode an excellent review, giving it a A−. In her recap, she gave the performances high marks: "Y’know, when I get so frustrated with OUAT, it’s because it sets a high bar up against itself. Like this episode, for example. It takes a classic myth, perfectly twists it into the show’s own purposes, and manages to be jaw-dropping in a single hour. I didn’t realize we were about to get so much out of “Nimue,” but I should have guessed once we found out that it was penned by Jane Espenson, who writes most of OUAT's best episodes."

Christine Orlando of TV Fanatic gave the episode a 4.4 out of 5 stars.
