= Swan Song (Once Upon a Time) =

- Once Upon a Time episode
- Episode no.: Season 5 Episode 11
- Directed by: Gwyneth Horder-Payton
- Written by: Edward Kitsis; Adam Horowitz
- Production code: 511
- Original air date: December 6, 2015

Guest appearances
- Lee Arenberg as Leroy/Grumpy; Oliver Bell as Young Killian; Adam Croasdell as Brennan; Caroline Ford as Nimue; Scott Hylands as Captain; Eric Keenleyside as Moe French

Episode chronology
← Previous "Broken Heart"	Next → "Souls of the Departed"
- Once Upon a Time season 5

"Swan Song" is the eleventh episode and midseason finale of the fifth season of the American fantasy drama series Once Upon a Time, which aired on December 6, 2015.

In this episode, Hook and the Dark Ones try to take over Storybrooke, but in the end, Hook is redeemed, and dies. Also, in the end, Emma, her parents, Regina, Robin, Henry, and Mr. Gold go to the Underworld to bring back Hook. In flashbacks, Hook is reunited with his father.

== Plot ==
=== Opening sequence ===
The cloaked forms of 11 resurrected Dark Ones are featured in the forest.

=== Event chronology ===
The Enchanted Forest flashbacks with young Killian take place years before "The Brothers Jones" and the Enchanted Forest flashback with Hook and the Evil Queen take place during "Queen of Hearts", before Hook leaves for Wonderland. The Storybrooke events take place after "Broken Heart" and before "Devil's Due". The final scene where everyone leaves for the Underworld, takes place after the scene where Mr. Gold says goodbye to Belle in "Souls of the Departed".

=== In the Characters' Past ===
On board the Jolly Roger, a young Killian is consoled by his father, Brennan, who promised his son that he would become the person that he was meant to be, only to suddenly abandon him and his brother, as he sold his sons into servitude, because Brennan was a wanted man and the ship was stolen. Years later in The Enchanted Forest, Regina recruits Hook to kill Cora, and takes Hook to a tavern, where she requires Hook to kill his father, who is now the tavern's owner. After the tavern closes, Hook confronts Brennan, who explains that his attempt to flee the law failed and was put under a sleeping curse as punishment; Brennan fell in love with the sound of his nurse's voice and she with him, allowing a kiss to wake him. They married, but she died soon after having their son. Believing that Brennan has changed, Hook has to make it look like he had his father killed, so he can help his father and half-brother escape. When Hook follows Brennan back to his home, he watches him with his son, and witnesses his father tell him the same things he told Hook when he was little, which makes Hook very enraged, thinking that his father lied about having changed. Hook then hears his father address his new son as "Liam". When Brennan goes outside to meet Hook, he takes back his offer, telling Brennan that he thinks he can replace Liam and continue making false promises, though Brennan claims that he named his new son to honor Liam's memory. Despite Brennan's insistence that he had changed, Hook kills Brennan, making Hook the person he is now. As Brennan dies, however, he tells Hook that it's never too late to change, to become a better man.

=== In Storybrooke ===
Hook, remembers the last time he saw his father, when Gold arrives to confront him but Hook is steadfast in carrying out his plan. Meanwhile, Emma is determined to stop Hook and everyone follows her and tells the others to split up. Regina and Robin then run into Zelena, who vows to get custody of her daughter, only to be confronted by a group of Dark Ones who then place a mark on Emma's family and friends in a similar fashion. Gold explains to Emma that it is the Mark of Charon, who navigates the ferry to the Underworld. The Dark Ones plan to sacrifice the souls of the marked living, who will replace them in Hell. Then, the 21 resurrected Dark Ones march through Storybrooke, led by Nimue, to prepare for their final battle.

Regina confronts Hook at the docks to remind him about what happened back in the Enchanted Forest, but Hook chokes her, saying times have changed. At Granny’s, Mary Margaret, David, and Henry choose to spend their last hours alive, while Emma reveals her plan to Regina that she wants to sacrifice herself of the darkness inside. Gold then hands over Excalibur to Emma and arranges for Belle to escape town and live her life. Regina and Robin then confront Zelena again ready to take full custody of her and Robin's baby and everything Regina owns once they both die with the others. However Robin tells Zelena that their daughter deserves her best chance with Regina also stating that it's not with her, so she uses Merlin's Wand to conjure up a magic tornado to send Zelena to Oz, with Zelena vowing to return. Emma prepares her plan to confront Hook, who appears at her house, but he has the upper hand after he transforms into Henry, fooling her into handing over Excalibur, which leaves her defenseless.

The 21 past Dark Ones, led by Nimue, bring the residents to the lake that will take them to the Underworld, and act as a barrier to keep them from escaping. Hook appears to help Nimue carry out the plan as Emma is left to watch. Regina then reminds Hook that he is unable to destroy Emma's family because he has changed as a person, and urges him to choose what kind of person he wants to be. Emma attempts to stop the Dark Ones from sacrificing her family, but Nimue starts choking Emma, despite being unable to kill her, to keep her from interfering. As Hook watches, he realizes the truth behind what Regina said, and uses Excalibur to absorb all of the darkness from Nimue and the Dark Ones into himself, which also traps all of the past Dark Ones inside Excalibur. Hook then asks Emma to kill him to destroy the Darkness, in order to allow him to die as a hero. A sad, crying Emma goes through with his wishes and impales Hook with Excalibur, which kills all of the previous Dark Ones. As Hook dies, his neck wound from Excalibur returns, and Emma is transformed back into her normal self, with Excalibur disintegrating afterwards.

The next day, Belle returns to Gold and forgives him. However, after Emma hears the whispers of the dagger, she meets with Gold, who reveals the truth to Emma, about him using a magic potion to turn Excalibur into a conduit, so that when Emma killed all of the Dark Ones, their magic was transferred into Gold, allowing Gold to reclaim his life as the Dark One, and creating a new Dagger in the process, with a reversed color scheme of a black blade with silver engravings. (Excalibur was still tethered to the Darkness, so when Gold became the Dark One again, the Dagger reappeared.) He adds that he is more powerful than ever before, since he now wields the combined power of every Dark One that ever lived including her. Emma is very cross about this and tells him that she now has leverage over Gold, threatening to tell Belle at any moment the truth about her husband. In exchange for Emma keeping the secret, Gold agrees to help her enter the Underworld to rescue Hook. At the lake, Emma is joined by Gold, Regina, Mary Margaret, David, Robin, and Henry, as they approach the ferry to descend into the Underworld.

== Reception ==
The episode received positive reviews with many critics praising both O'Donoghue and Morrison's performances. The fan reception was rather negative through especially with the development of Rumple.

In a review from Rickey.org, Nick Roman said, "With Disney owning Star Wars now, it was only a matter of time until we saw elements of that universe incorporated into Once Upon a Time. The winter finale incorporated a climax that was straight out of Return of the Jedi, and it was remarkably powerful in its application. But make no mistake: while “Swan Song” is an undoubtedly emotional hour of television, it’s also incredibly frustrating in how it restores the status quo. The more things change, the more they stay the same."

Andrea Towers of Entertainment Weekly notes in her assessment of the review: "From Camelot to Neverland, the show has never quite been able to sustain itself when it’s simply Storybrooke, as much as some of the better stories have been rooted there. So it’s not a shock to find out that, after tonight, we’re probably going to be spending some time in the Underworld next month. We already know we’re meeting Hercules and Megara; given tonight’s events, does that also mean we’re meeting Hades? The bigger (and more interesting) question at stake is the fact that now that we’re in the Underworld, how many previously dead characters are going to get a chance to return? We’ve already had confirmations of past-dead characters like Cruella and Cora, though both of those characters are supposedly strictly for the show’s 100th episode. Regardless, moving to the Underworld opens up a host of options for 5B in terms of characters and plot, and I’m curious to see what those options are."

Amy Ratcliffe of IGN said of the episode, "The twists in Emma's and Hook's paths carried the episode. Death is an amorphous concept in Once Upon a Time, but whatever ends up happening with Hook, his sacrifice had an impact. The scene between him and Emma was painful to watch; both O'Donoghue and Morrison brought so much emotion to Hook and Emma's goodbye. The fact that Emma wielded the sword should mean interesting twists for her development too." Ratcliffe gave the episode a 7.9 rating out of 10.

Gwen Ihnat of The A.V. Club gave the episode an excellent review, giving it a B. In her recap, she points out: "It was a fun half-season, one of the series’ best, and one it will be tough for OUaT to top, even with a fun spring break in Hades."

Christine Orlando of TV Fanatic gave the episode a 4.6 out of 5.
