= Devil's Due =

Devil's Due, a variation of the idiom "give the devil his due", may refer to:

- Devil's Due (film), a 2014 American supernatural horror film
- "Devil's Due" (Once Upon a Time), an episode of the TV series Once Upon a Time
- "Devil's Due" (Star Trek: The Next Generation), an episode of the TV series Star Trek: The Next Generation
- Devil's Due Publishing, an independent comic book publisher
