= Our Decay =

- Once Upon a Time episode
- Episode no.: Season 5 Episode 16
- Directed by: Steve Pearlman
- Written by: Tze Chun & Dana Horgan
- Production code: 516
- Original air date: April 3, 2016

Guest appearances
- Emma Caulfield as the Blind Witch; Greg Germann as Hades; Teri Reeves as Dorothy Gale; Paul Scheer as the Scarecrow; Jeff Gulka as Boq; Keegan Connor Tracy as Blue Fairy/Mother Superior

Episode chronology
| ← Previous "The Brothers Jones" | Next → "Her Handsome Hero" |
- Once Upon a Time season 5

"Our Decay" is the sixteenth episode of the fifth season of the American fantasy drama series Once Upon a Time, which aired on April 3, 2016.

In this episode, Belle, Zelena, and Baby Hood end up in the Underworld. In flashbacks, Hades and Zelena meet.

== Plot ==
=== Opening sequence ===
Munchkins appear in the red-tinted forest.

=== Event chronology ===
The Oz events take place years after "Kansas" and many years before "Ruby Slippers". The Storybrooke events take place after "Devil's Due" and before "Last Rites". The Underworld events take place after "The Brothers Jones".

=== In the Characters' Past ===
Many years ago in the Land of Oz, Zelena is "celebrating" the day she was abandoned by her mother Cora. Her flying monkeys bring back a Scarecrow, whose brain she plans to steal and use to create a time travel spell to alter history. However, the Scarecrow is saved by Dorothy, who has come back to Oz using a pair of silver slippers. Zelena later confronts the Munchkins who told Dorothy that Zelena was still alive. Hades appears and offers his assistance to capture the Scarecrow, but Zelena replies that she needs no help and vanishes. However, Zelena later reconsiders. Hades reveals that his power is limited to the underworld unless he receives a kiss of true love. Later on, Hades brings Zelena to Dorothy’s bicycle so that they can find the Scarecrow. Hades enchants it so it will bring the two to Dorothy and they find an attraction between them. They arrive and Zelena takes The Scarecrow’s brain, but leaves Dorothy alive to prevent turning her into a martyr and to humiliate her. As Hades reveals his love for Zelena, but she believes that he is only manipulating her for true love's kiss and the time travel spell which he will use for his revenge against Zeus. Zelena demands that Hades leave Oz.

=== In Storybrooke ===
At the convent, Belle tends to baby Neal when she sees Mother Superior. A second Mother Superior shows up, telling Belle that her double is an impostor. Zelena reveals herself, who came back from Oz to take back her child. As she prepares to escape the convent, a portal opens that sends Belle, Zelena, and Zelena's baby to the Underworld.

=== In the Underworld ===
In the Underworld, the clock hand ticks again, signifying that yet another soul had moved on, (Note: Probably the Apprentice's soul, since Henry made the decision not to resurrect Cruella or to alter events with the Author's Pen, in the previous episode.) while Hades reflects on the page depicting him with Zelena. At this point, 12 souls had moved on from the Underworld (since the clock in the Underworld had shifted from 8:15 to 8:27). Inside Hades' lair, Hades is furious that Gold is taking his time to create a portal to Storybrooke in order to transport Zelena’s baby daughter to him, telling him that the success of this plan will be the difference in whether or not Gold's secrets are revealed to Belle and if Gold's debt to Hades will be cancelled, unless he finishes the job quickly. Meanwhile, Snow and David discover that they can use a special phone to contact their son Neal through the process of haunting. At the loft, Henry is still feeling less useful even as he shows them illustrated drawings that seems to come to him but can't explain it.

Later on, Zelena surprises Robin, Regina, Emma, Henry, David and Snow and told them about the portal that brought her, Belle and the baby to the Underworld. At the same time, Belle catches up and surprises Gold who then comes clean about still being the Dark One and his reacquired powers, as well as her pregnancy, but then he tells Belle that she will have to choose whether or not she wants to be with him and that he will never change. Robin, Regina and Zelena catch up with Belle and return the baby to Zelena so she can feed her. However, Zelena was about deceive everyone by escaping with her daughter, only to have a change of heart and returning her baby, upon learning that her magic isn’t powerful enough in the Underworld to protect the baby by herself, having suspected that Hades brought her to the Underworld so that he can use her daughter to enact a time-travel spell. Meanwhile, at the loft, everyone starts to believe that Zelena, even without her powers, can help them. Henry also shows them more drawings, including the story of baby Neal hearing his parents, indicating that Snow and David succeeded in getting the message to their son.

Outside in the street, Zelena later confronts Hades to tell him that she will never give him her baby. Hades later admits to having feelings for her, claiming that he was simply trying to summon her daughter to keep it away from her enemies, and even going as far as creating an Underworld version of Storybrooke for them to share together. However, Zelena turns down Hades again. He finally tells her that if she ever changes her mind, he’ll always be waiting for her "at home" in the Underworld.

== Production ==
Rose McGowan who played young Cora, was not credited in this episode, which used flashback footage.

== Reception ==
The episode was met with positive reviews.

Andrea Towers of Entertainment Weekly gave it a positive review, noting the chemistry between Rebecca Mader and Greg Germann.

However, Amy Ratcliffe of IGN said of the episode, "We only learned about the Hades and Zelena connection in the last episode, and twenty minutes of flashbacks in this episode weren't enough to sell their love story. Two characters known for being evil need extra time to make genuine feelings convincing, and it didn't happen here." Ratcliffe gave the episode a 6.8 rating out of 10.

Christine Orlando of TV Fanatic gave the episode a 4.6 out of 5.

One review from "TV.com" gives this episode a 7.8 out of 10.
