= Once Upon a Time season 5 =

Once Upon a Time
- Season 5
- DVD cover
- Starring: Ginnifer Goodwin; Jennifer Morrison; Lana Parrilla; Josh Dallas; Emilie de Ravin; Colin O'Donoghue; Jared S. Gilmore; Rebecca Mader; Sean Maguire; Robert Carlyle
- No. of episodes: 23

Release
- Original network: ABC
- Original release: September 27, 2015 – May 15, 2016

Season chronology
- ← Previous; Season 4 Next → Season 6

The fifth season of the American ABC fantasy-drama series Once Upon a Time was ordered on May 7, 2015. Like the previous two seasons, it was also split into two volumes, with the first airing from September 27 to December 6, 2015, and the second from March 6 to May 15, 2016. The season also saw the series reach its 100th episode, which aired on March 6, 2016 as the mid-season premiere. Ginnifer Goodwin, Jennifer Morrison, Lana Parrilla, Josh Dallas, Emilie de Ravin, Colin O'Donoghue, Jared S. Gilmore, and Robert Carlyle return as principal cast members from the previous season, and are joined by Rebecca Mader and Sean Maguire. This season is the only one to feature Maguire in a regular capacity.

Existing fictional characters introduced to the series during the season include antagonists King Arthur and Nimue for the first volume and Hades for the second, alongside Guinevere, Merlin, Merida, Percival, Hercules, Megara, Zeus, Poole, Jekyll and Hyde. The season also saw the return of numerous deceased characters from previous seasons, including the Blind Witch, Cora Mills / the Queen of Hearts, Peter Pan, Cruella de Vil, Baelfire / Neal Cassidy, Milah, Prince Henry, Liam Jones, Prince James, Gaston, Claude, and Stealthy.

== Premise ==
With Emma having become the new Dark One, her family travels to Camelot to find the sorcerer Merlin, in a bid to remove the darkness from her. They meet King Arthur and Queen Guinevere of Camelot, with both on the hunt of the Dark One's dagger to make Excalibur whole. The trip to Camelot is cut short when another Dark Curse is cast, returning everyone to Storybrooke, where it is revealed that Hook had also become a Dark One and is responsible for the new curse. The battle to destroy the darkness leads to the death of Hook, prompting Emma and the heroes to travel to the Underworld, where Hades, as well as most of the deceased villains, have plans of their own to return to the land of the living. Hook is eventually resurrected, but a bid by Mr. Gold to capture all of Storybrooke's magic results in the arrival of Dr. Jekyll, Mr. Hyde and refugees from the Land of Untold Stories to Storybrooke, as well as the separation of Regina Mills and her evil self.

== Cast and characters ==
=== Main ===
- Ginnifer Goodwin as Snow White / Mary Margaret Blanchard
- Jennifer Morrison as Emma Swan / Dark Swan
- Lana Parrilla as Evil Queen / Regina Mills (Note: Also appears as the Serum counterpart in "An Untold Story")
- Josh Dallas as Prince Charming / David Nolan (Note: Dallas also portrays Prince James, David's twin brother, in "Sisters")
- Emilie de Ravin as Belle French
- Colin O'Donoghue as Captain Hook / Killian Jones
- Jared S. Gilmore as Henry Mills
- Rebecca Mader as Wicked Witch of the West / Zelena
- Sean Maguire as Robin Hood
- Robert Carlyle as Rumplestiltskin / Mr. Gold

=== Recurring ===
- Liam Garrigan as King Arthur
- Elliot Knight as The Sorcerer / Merlin / the Usher
- Joana Metrass as Guinevere
- Lee Arenberg as Grumpy / Dreamy / Leroy
- Beverley Elliott as Widow Lucas / Granny
- Andrew Jenkins as Percival
- Sinqua Walls as Lancelot
- Amy Manson as Merida
- Olivia Steele Falconer as Violet
- Keegan Connor Tracy as The Blue Fairy / Mother Superior
- Timothy Webber as the Apprentice
- Meghan Ory as Red Riding Hood / Ruby
- Jamie Chung as Mulan
- David Anders as Dr. Victor Frankenstein / Dr. Whale
- Barbara Hershey as Cora Mills / Queen of Hearts
- Caroline Ford as Nimue
- Robbie Kay as Malcolm / Peter Pan / Pied Piper
- Greg Germann as Hades
- Giancarlo Esposito as Magic Mirror / Sidney Glass
- Victoria Smurfit as Cruella de Vil / Cruella Feinberg
- Tony Perez as Prince Henry Mills
- Teri Reeves as Dorothy Gale
- Michael Raymond-James as Baelfire / Neal Cassidy
- Emma Caulfield as the Blind Witch

=== Guest ===
- Mckenna Grace as Young Emma
- Ryan Robbins as Sir Morgan
- Paul Telfer as Lord Macintosh
- Glenn Keogh as King Fergus
- Caroline Morahan as Queen Elinor
- Lily Knight as Witch of DunBroch
- Adam Croasdell as Brennan Jones
- Oliver Bell as Young Killian
- Eric Keenleyside as Maurice / Moe French
- Bailee Madison as Young Snow White
- Jonathan Whitesell as Hercules
- Kacey Rohl as Megara
- Rachel Shelley as Milah
- Bernard Curry as Liam Jones
- Costas Mandylor as Captain Silver
- Jeff Gulka as Boq
- Paul Scheer voices Scarecrow
- Wes Brown as Gaston
- Ava Acres as Young Regina
- Isabella Blake-Thomas as Young Zelena
- Rya Kihlstedt as Cleo Fox
- Max Chadburn as Natasha "Tasha" Morris
- Geoff Gustafson as Stealthy
- David Hoflin as Zeus
- Hank Harris as Dr. Jekyll / the Groundsman
- Sam Witwer as Mr. Hyde / the Warden
- Arnold Pinnock as Poole / the Orderly
- Tzi Ma as the Dragon

== Episodes ==
No. overall	No. in season	Title	Directed by	Written by	Original release date	US viewers (millions)
89	1	"The Dark Swan"	Ron Underwood	Edward Kitsis & Adam Horowitz	September 27, 2015	5.93
The event of Emma being taken by the Darkness has the Storybrooke residents seeking a way to bring her back, and the only way to make it happen is to turn to an unlikely person: Zelena. However, the wicked witch has other plans in mind, only to be thwarted by Regina, who uses Zelena's magic to activate the Apprentice's wand, which creates a portal that brings everyone to the Enchanted Forest. They find a bewildered Emma, who is trying to track down Merlin, and along the way befriends Merida, while being guided by a dark apparition of Rumplestiltskin, who wants Emma to embrace the Darkness. After they meet up with King Arthur in their quest in Camelot, the residents return to Storybrooke six weeks later, with no memories of what happened in Camelot, while wearing completely different attires. Emma then shows up, now a fully-fledged Dark One, and vows vengeance on her loved ones.
90	2	"The Price"	Romeo Tirone	Andrew Chambliss & Dana Horgan	October 4, 2015	5.38
The Storybrooke residents try to keep Arthur and the rest of Camelot from revealing their identities and prevent Emma from going dark as they search for Merlin, so Regina pretends to be the Savior in order to spare Emma the trouble. As the Storybrooke arrivals are feted at a ball in their honor, Percival catches on to the deception, attempts to avenge himself on Regina. In the ensuing fight, Robin is stabbed with Percival's enchanted sword, but David kills Percival. Regina begs Emma to save Robin, but despite Hook's plea not to, Emma does so, and results in Regina eventually paying the price. In Storybrooke, the residents, and the now-transplanted Arthurians, are becoming fearful of Emma as the Dark One, and Regina must step up when a demon called the Fury attempts to take Robin's soul as payment, due to Emma having saved him on Regina's behalf. Meanwhile, Hook is feeling that Emma's good side is no longer there, while Henry meets a girl named Violet. It is revealed that Emma brought the Excalibur sword with the stone to Storybrooke, but she can't pull out Excalibur to make it whole unless she pays a price.
91	3	"Siege Perilous"	Ralph Hemecker	Jane Espenson	October 11, 2015	5.28
In Camelot, the quest to free Merlin continues when Arthur and David head to Brocéliande, the Forest of Eternal Night, and fight to obtain a toadstool called the Crimson Crown, which can allow them to communicate with Merlin. In the present, Emma manipulates Hook in order to gain Hook's sword. In the end, Emma brings Mr. Gold out of his coma by using Hook's sword, which had touched him prior to him becoming the Dark One. She informs the newly awakened Gold that she is going to mold him into a hero who can remove Excalibur from its stone. King Arthur's true intentions are revealed in Camelot and start to emerge in Storybrooke when uses his squire, Grif, to deceive David into believing that Grif had stolen key items, all as part of a plan to turn Storybrooke into a "New Camelot".
92	4	"The Broken Kingdom"	Alrick Riley	David H. Goodman & Jerome Schwartz	October 18, 2015	4.92
In Camelot's past, Arthur's obsession with Excalibur has taken a toll on Guinevere and leads to a betrayal of trust by Lancelot, as the two seek out the dagger. This leads to a confrontation with Rumplestiltskin, who offers a deal that Guinevere takes and ends up paying the price for at the hands of Arthur. This scenario comes full circle five years later, (Note: From Camelot's point of view. There is a gap of 33 years between the flashback storyline and the 'present-day' Camelot storyline, including the frozen 28 years of the first Dark Curse.) when Arthur learns of Emma being the Dark One from David after Mary Margaret confides that Lancelot is alive. Unfortunately, David and Mary Margaret's plan to save Emma and help Lancelot is foiled with Arthur arresting Lancelot and using Guinevere to brainwash David and Mary Margaret into doing his bidding. Lancelot discovers that he is not alone in trying to stop Arthur, as he is joined by another cellmate, Merida. Meanwhile, Hook, with the help of Henry, tries to keep Emma from giving in to Rumplestiltskin's manifestations by spending a romantic day with her. In present-day Storybrooke, Emma tells a reluctant Gold that she has plans to make him a hero and has found the perfect person to help her do the job: Merida.
93	5	"Dreamcatcher"	Romeo Tirone	Edward Kitsis & Adam Horowitz	October 25, 2015	5.12
In Camelot, Emma discovers how Merlin became a tree, so she and Regina race against time to find a tear of lost first love to release him, before Arthur stops them. At the same time Henry tries to prove to Violet that he can be heroic after confronting her father Sir Morgan, but a dinner date turns into a heartbreaker for Henry, which leads to his tear being used to free Merlin. Even as Arthur vows to get even, Merlin agrees to help Emma free her from the darkness. In Storybrooke, Emma sends Gold and Merida into the woods so Gold can become the hero, but after seeing how cowardly he is, Merida takes the chipped cup and uses it to bring out his bravery. As Henry convinced Emma to help Violet look for her horse, Regina, Hook, Robin, and Belle sneak into Emma's home and discover not just Excalibur, but the dreamcatcher, where Regina discovers Violet's memories, in which Emma used her to break Henry's heart back in Camelot in order to obtain Henry's teardrop. Regina and Henry both feel betrayed by Emma and shut her out of their life.
94	6	"The Bear and the Bow"	Ralph Hemecker	Andrew Chambliss & Tze Chun	November 1, 2015	4.83
In Camelot, Merida enlists Belle on a mission to save her brothers from the United Clans by using a spell to battle the clans, but Belle believes that her faith in fate should be enough to make Merida brave. In Storybrooke, Emma tries to force Merida to kill Belle so she can make Gold heroic. When Gold finally realizes that Belle sees him as a coward, Gold brings out his bravery by defeating Merida after the archer turns into a bear. Gold then releases Excalibur and places it at Emma's feet but tells her that he is the hero now. At the same time Emma offers Zelena a deal while the residents discovers Arthur's deception, as well as discovering a message from Merlin with help from Henry.
95	7	"Nimue"	Romeo Tirone	Jane Espenson	November 8, 2015	4.88
In flashbacks taking place 1,033 years prior, Merlin drank from the Holy Grail, begetting his transformation into a wizard who is able to heal the forlorn of his village, thus becoming a Christ-like figure. He meets a distraught woman by the name of Nimue, whose village and family were slaughtered by a mongol named Vortigan. Over time the two fall in love, but Merlin's immortality is an obstacle. They set out on a journey to forge the grail into a sword, that will cut away his immortality. Using the Promethean Flame, Merlin conjures Excalibur, but Vortigan attacks them, apparently killing Nimue. However, Nimue had also drunk from the grail. Citing her newfound ability to take vengeance, she kills Vortigan, becoming the first Dark One, and breaks the sword into two pieces. Meanwhile, in Camelot, Merlin and Emma set out on a journey to speak with the first Dark One and claim the Promethean Spark; while Zelena double-crosses the heroes and joins forces with Arthur. Zelena imbues Merlin's name to the broken Excalibur, and Arthur uses it to command the suddenly enslaved Merlin to do his bidding.
96	8	"Birth"	Eagle Egilsson	David H. Goodman & Jerome Schwartz	November 15, 2015	4.85
In Camelot, after saving her family and friends from Arthur and Zelena, Emma struggles to rid herself of dark magic. She's holding herself back due to fear of commitment with Hook. She works through the fear and attempts to meld Excalibur, but Hook falls to the floor. Facing his death, Emma conjures the dark magic from the sword and instills it in Hook, causing him to be reborn as a Dark One. In Storybrooke, our heroes confront the treacherous Arthur. He gets the drop on Hook, but Emma swiftly subdues him. She claims that all she's done has been for Hook, then disappears. While Hook is in search of answers and a way to get Emma's attention, Zelena's pregnancy is suddenly expedited, causing her to give birth shortly after. Believing Emma wants the baby, Regina and Robin rally defences, but she takes Zelena instead. Emma reveals her plan to transfer all dark magic to a vessel, Zelena, to rid the world of it forever. While she is away, Hook and Zelena escape. Zelena reveals to Hook one of Emma's dreamcatchers, enlightening him to his dark predicament.
97	9	"The Bear King"	Geofrey Hildrew	Andrew Chambliss	November 15, 2015	4.85
Back in Camelot, Arthur is desperate for aid in his quest to unite Excalibur, leading him and Zelena to Dunbroch to find an enchanted helm. In flashbacks, King Fergus visits the wood-carving witch in the woods, asking for something that would ensure the longevity of his kingdom. She in turn gives him the helm. In Dunbroch, (Note: The 'present-day' Dunbroch storyline takes place two years after the 'flashback' Dunbroch storyline, which takes place in-between the events of the season two episodes "Queen of Hearts" and "And Straight On 'til Morning".) Merida's coronation day commences. Just as she's about to be crowned, the witch appears and demands the helm be returned to her or she'll cast a bear spell on the entire kingdom. On her journey, Merida recruits the aid of Mulan and Red, the former battle instructor for the princess. When they reach the helm, they are met with opposition from Arthur and Zelena, whom they and members of the clans overpower. Back at the castle, Merida declares she will destroy the helm instead of returning it to the witch. The witch explains that the journey was all a test to ensure that she had the necessary skills to lead the kingdom. The clans unite and Merida is crowned queen. Later, after speaking with the spirit of her father, Merida vows revenge on Arthur, who is revealed to have killed Fergus.
98	10	"Broken Heart"	Romeo Tirone	Dana Horgan & Tze Chun	November 29, 2015	4.38
In Camelot, Hook embraces another path of revenge on the man he holds responsible for his life-long pain, Rumplestiltskin. Emma attempts to put a stop to his vengeance, but fails. She is then forced to take desperate measures. In Storybrooke, Henry and Emma team up to put a stop to Hook's Dark One misdeeds, while he is preoccupied with Rumplestiltskin. Meanwhile, Rumple and Belle experience relationship tribulations and Zelena adapts to skewed motherhood.
99	11	"Swan Song"	Gwyneth Horder-Payton	Edward Kitsis & Adam Horowitz	December 6, 2015	4.56
Back in the Enchanted Forest, Hook's feelings about his father abandoning him as a young boy lead to Hook killing him when Regina recruits him to kill Cora. In Storybrooke, as Hook and Nimue prepare to send Emma's family and friends to the Underworld to allow the resurrected Dark Ones to stay, his memories remind him of the man he wants to be. When he realizes what will happen if he goes through with it, Hook turns Excalibur on the previous Dark Ones and asks Emma to sacrifice him with Excalibur, saving everyone and returning Emma to normal. Emma discovers Gold used the situation to tether the darkness back into himself, leading Emma to blackmail Gold into helping her bring Hook back from the Underworld. Meanwhile, Regina sends Zelena back to Oz, after Zelena attempted to get sole custody of her daughter.
100	12	"Souls of the Departed"	Ralph Hemecker	Edward Kitsis & Adam Horowitz	March 6, 2016	4.01
The heroes arrive in the Underworld, which bears a striking resemblance to Storybrooke. Here, souls with unfinished business live, including Peter Pan and Cora. Cora offers Regina a way out, telling her she has one hour to leave on the ferry with Henry and Robin. Regina finds the soul of her father, whom Cora has threatened to send to a deeper layer of hell if she does not leave soon. When Regina's father tells her she has come too far to betray her friends now, Cora attempts to banish him. However, as Regina has chosen to stay, Cora's attempts are ineffective, as seeing his daughter choose to stay a hero resolved his unfinished business. With his soul at peace, he is accepted into "a better place" and departs the Underworld after saying goodbye to Regina and Henry. The heroes realize they could potentially rescue all the souls here and continue their quest to find Hook with this in mind. Cora meets with the ruler of the Underworld, Hades, who wishes the heroes gone. He punishes Cora for her failure with an eternity as a miller's daughter once again. Flashbacks show Regina celebrating her birthday with a surprising visit from her mother, Cora.
101	13	"Labor of Love"	Billy Gierhart	Andrew Chambliss & Dana Horgan	March 13, 2016	4.31
After a prisoner is sent by Hook to tell Emma that he is alive, a creature known as Cerberus begins pursuing the outsiders. This prompts Mary Margaret to turn to the only person who can defeat the creature, Hercules, as she learns that he has unfinished business and is therefore in the Underworld. Back in the Enchanted Forest, he was responsible for giving her the courage to fight back against the Evil Queen's bandits. When the outsiders learn that he has lost that confidence, Mary Margaret decides it's time for him to restore it as they square off against Cerberus and, with the help of the prisoner, kill the creature, giving Hercules and the prisoner, revealed to be Megara, their tickets out. In the process, Regina convinces Mary Margaret to again become Snow White, the woman who took risks before the original curse. A furious Hades vows to make the outsiders pay by forcing Hook to choose which living souls will stay behind as recompense for the souls they've redeemed. Meanwhile, Henry encounters Cruella, who wants him, in his role as The Author, to resurrect and return her to the world of the living, so that Emma's soul will no longer be branded a murderer's, but he keeps this offer to himself.
102	14	"Devil's Due"	Alrick Riley	Jane Espenson	March 20, 2016	3.54
In the past, Rumplestiltskin is forced to promise his second child to a healer when Baelfire falls ill from a snakebite; however, after becoming the Dark One, he kills the healer to void the deal. In the present, Hades grows frustrated with Hook's refusal to chisel three names down onto the headstones, signifying those who will remain in the Underworld to replace Prince Henry Mills, Hercules, and Megara. He threatens to drop Hook into the River of Lost Souls. Mr. Gold finds Milah, the ex-wife he killed, convincing her to help him and Emma find Hook. However, while Emma rescues Hook, Hades offers Gold the chance to leave in exchange for destroying the boat; Gold blasts Milah out into the River of Lost Souls, hoping to keep the deal secret. Later, when Regina attempts to split Emma's heart in two to revive Hook, she finds a protection spell stopping her. It turns out Hades has chosen Emma Swan, Regina Mills, and Snow White to replace the souls they freed. Also, Hades reveals that he's taken on the debt Gold owes the healer; it turns out Belle is now pregnant. Now, Rumplestiltskin must now work for Hades; otherwise, Hades will take his unborn child.
103	15	"The Brothers Jones"	Eagle Egilsson	Jerome Schwartz & David H. Goodman	March 27, 2016	3.51
In the past, Liam promises that he and Killian will find a way to get out of Captain Silver's servitude. However, he eventually gives in to Hades's offer of the "Eye of the Storm" jewel to buy their freedom, in exchange for selling out the souls of the entire crew during a dangerous mission for the same jewel. In the Underworld, Liam is reunited with Hook and joins the others in searching for the Underworld version of the "Once Upon a Time" book, only to be blackmailed by Hades who wants pages containing him removed. When Emma catches on to Liam's deception, Hook learns the truth after Captain Silver and his crew reveal what Liam did in the past, which leads to Liam sacrificing himself to save Hook, allowing he and the ship's crew to move on. It is later revealed that the pages Hades wanted have something to do with Zelena. Meanwhile, Henry discovers that the Apprentice is in the Underworld to help guide him in finding the quill, hoping he will make the right decision in lieu of helping Cruella. Later, Cruella makes a move on David while he is impersonating James, only to realize the deception, and she tells David about James' resentment toward him, about being raised by their mother Ruth.
104	16	"Our Decay"	Steve Pearlman	Tze Chun & Dana Horgan	April 3, 2016	3.78
In the past in Oz, Zelena's plot to create a time travel portal is derailed by the return of Dorothy Gale. When Hades arrives to help Zelena with her plan to steal the Scarecrow's brain, the two find romantic feelings for each other but, after they succeed, Zelena turns on Hades, believing that he is using her in order to get even with Zeus. In the Underworld, Hades forces Gold to create a portal that brings Zelena, Belle, and Zelena's baby to the Underworld. Unfortunately, when they arrive, Zelena discovers that Hades is behind the plot and that her magic is too weak to protect her child, while Belle learns the truth from Gold about his reclaiming his powers and her pregnancy, as well as the contract now with Hades. Zelena gives up her daughter to those who can better protect her, determined to keep Hades from using her to enact the time-travel portal, only to discover his love for her is unchanged. Meanwhile, Snow and David find a way to contact their son, and Henry starts to write stories in his sleep.
105	17	"Her Handsome Hero"	Romeo Tirone	Jerome Schwartz	April 10, 2016	3.75
In the past, Belle meets Gaston, and they come upon a young ogre in the forest. Gaston wants to use violence to get information from him, but Belle believes there's a more compassionate way. In the Underworld, Hades enlists Gaston to seek revenge on Gold, leading Belle to find out his unfinished business, only to have Hades make a deal with Belle that could determine the fate of her unborn child. Emma has a dream vision that comes true as she, Hook, and Snow attempt to reverse the graveyard spell. When Hook senses a storm brewing, he, Emma, Snow, and Regina go to the woods, where Emma uses her magic to take out the creature borne from the storm. The creature turns out to be a werewolf, who Snow discovers is Ruby/Red Riding Hood, having somehow ended up in the Underworld.
106	18	"Ruby Slippers"	Eriq La Salle	Andrew Chambliss & Bill Wolkoff	April 17, 2016	3.76
In the past, after teaming up in Camelot, Ruby and Mulan have made their way to Oz in search of the wolf pack. They meet Dorothy just as Zelena returns to Oz after being banished by Regina. Ruby and Dorothy form a bond as they work on a plan to defeat Zelena and get Toto back. In the present, Ruby finds herself in the Underworld after using a tracking spell to lead her to Zelena. Zelena reveals that she put Dorothy under a sleeping curse which can only be broken by true love's kiss. The heroes believe that a kiss from Dorothy's deceased Auntie Em is the solution but, after Hades ruins their plans, Snow suggests to Ruby that her feelings for Dorothy might allow her to break the curse. Meanwhile, David and Snow get antsy after the phonebooth is removed and they have no way to check up on their son. After Hook is able to change the name on Snow's headstone to "David Nolan", Snow is able to leave the Underworld with Ruby and the two head over to Oz, where Ruby is able to free Dorothy.
107	19	"Sisters"	Romeo Tirone	David H. Goodman & Brigitte Hales	April 24, 2016	3.85
Hades offers Zelena the chance for them to be a family, but at the cost of leaving the "outsiders" in the Underworld. Regina finds out about this and turns to Cora for help, leading to a reunion and closure between Cora and her daughters. Meanwhile, David meets his deceased twin, James, who jealously decides to get rid of Emma and Robin with Cruella's help. Gold finds a loophole in his attempt to save Belle and kidnaps Zelena with help from Peter Pan. In the Enchanted Forest in the past, Cora brings Zelena from Oz to save Regina, only for Cora to cut the sisters' time short when they discover that they're related, as Cora fears Zelena's presence will derail Regina's future as the new queen.
108	20	"Firebird"	Ron Underwood	Jane Espenson	May 1, 2016	3.77
In 2009 Maine, Emma buys food at Chantley's Lobster House while seeking her birth family. A bondswoman named Cleo Fox is after Emma for skipping town in Phoenix. At a nearby courthouse, Emma and Cleo are waiting for records from Emma's discovery as a baby, but find little of use. A year later in Boston, Emma is now a bondswoman seeking Cleo's biological daughter, Tasha, on behalf of her unexpected fallen friend. In the Underworld, Hades, Zelena, her daughter, and the Storybrooke residents return home through a portal made by the fallen clock tower near the Underworld graveyard, except for Hook, who could not be saved in the end. With Hades's departure, Cruella declares herself the new ruler of the Underworld.
109	21	"Last Rites"	Craig Powell	Jerome Schwartz	May 8, 2016	3.75
As everyone returns to Storybrooke, they plan to stop Hades, who wants to unleash the Olympian Crystal, a family heirloom, on those he sees as a threat. When Zelena's feelings blind her to the truth, Emma, Regina, and Robin have to find a way to prove Hades's deception, leading to Robin sacrificing his life for Regina and Zelena using the Crystal to destroy Hades. In the Underworld, a deceased Arthur, killed by Hades in Storybrooke, joins Hook in finding the missing element in killing Hades. After he succeeds in reaching Emma, Hook is allowed to move on but is revived by Zeus, while Arthur stays behind to fulfill his destiny of repairing a "broken kingdom". Zelena names her daughter Robin in honor of her father during his funeral. Meanwhile, after Moe refused to help wake Belle from her sleeping curse and Hades chose not to cut a deal, Gold takes advantage of the situation by acquiring a piece of the Crystal for a new plan.
110	22	"Only You"	Romeo Tirone	David H. Goodman & Andrew Chambliss	May 15, 2016	4.07
Regina is mourning Robin Hood when Gold tethers all of Storybrooke's magic to the Crystal fragment in a scheme to awaken Belle. Because of all the pain magic has caused his family, Henry uses his Author powers to take the Crystal, intending to destroy magic; Violet teams up with him. Zelena opens a portal, allowing Merida, the Merry Men, Arthur's court and the Camelot residents to return to the Enchanted Forest; she, David, Hook, and Snow are then sucked into the portal to the Land of Untold Stories, a place where those who hated their lives chose to flee, where they are held captive by Mr. Hyde. Meanwhile, Regina and Emma track Henry down to New York City, who is followed by Gold. Henry and Violet find a second, black-colored Holy Grail in the New York Public Library, before Gold arrives and steals the Crystal.
111	23	"An Untold Story"	Dean White	Edward Kitsis & Adam Horowitz	May 15, 2016	4.07
Dr. Jekyll succeeds in separating himself from Mr. Hyde, wishing to join the heroes in Storybrooke. Henry uses the black Holy Grail to banish magic while interrupting a confrontation between Emma, Regina, and Gold, inadvertently trapping the rest of his family in the Land of Untold Stories. The group seeks the Dragon's help; though he fails to open a gateway, he reveals magic has always existed in the real world. With a pep talk from Emma, Henry gives a speech to New York citizens about believing in magic, and asks them to make wishes in the park's fountain. This opens a portal, bringing the heroes home. Jekyll gives Snow some of his serum for Regina, allowing her to separate from her Evil Queen persona and crush her heart. Gold confronts Mr. Hyde, who promises him information on how to wake Belle in exchange for ownership of Storybrooke. Hyde arrives in Storybrooke along with some of his "friends". Back in New York, the Dragon is confronted by the manifestation of the Evil Queen, who takes his heart and declares war.

== Production ==
=== Development ===
The season has been confirmed to be split into two halves, with the mid-season premiere being the 100th episode. In October 2015, Horowitz announced that the episode set to air on November 15, 2015 was set to be a two-hour episode. He later clarified that the season's twelfth episode would be considered the 100th episode of the show, stating "it's all semantics. But yes, we're considering 512 the 100th!" when discussing the fourth-season episode, "Smash the Mirror", being two separate episodes.

=== Casting ===
On June 9, 2015, it was announced that Rebecca Mader and Sean Maguire had been promoted to series regulars for the fifth season, portraying their characters Zelena / Wicked Witch of the West and Robin Hood, respectively, while it was later revealed that Michael Socha would not be returning as a series regular as Will Scarlet / Knave of Hearts although further appearances as a recurring or guest star were hinted. Adam Horowitz confirmed via Twitter that Emilie de Ravin would return as Belle, while Vine Report confirmed the return of Jennifer Morrison as Emma Swan. On June 26, 2015, Josh Dallas confirmed his return as Prince Charming / David Nolan and Horowitz confirmed that there would be ten series regulars for the season. During Comic-Con 2015, Ginnifer Goodwin, Lana Parrilla, Colin O'Donoghue and Robert Carlyle were confirmed to return as Snow White / Mary Margaret Blanchard, Evil Queen / Regina Mills, Captain Killian "Hook" Jones and Rumplestiltskin / Mr. Gold respectively, while Morrison's character was confirmed to take on the moniker "Dark Swan". Jared S. Gilmore also returned as Henry Mills.

On June 26, 2015, it was revealed that Sinqua Walls would return as Lancelot. On July 1, 2015, it was announced that Liam Garrigan would play King Arthur during the first half of the season, while Gabe Khouth and Lee Arenberg confirmed via social media that they would be returning as Sneezy / Tom Clark and as Grumpy / Dreamy / Leroy respectively. On July 10, Beverley Elliott and Keegan Connor Tracy confirmed via their Twitter accounts that they would be returning as Widow Lucas / Granny and Blue Fairy / Mother Superior respectively while it was also confirmed that Elliot Knight, Joana Metrass and Andrew Jenkins had been cast as Merlin, Guinevere and Percival respectively.

Adam Horowitz announced on Twitter that Amy Manson had been cast in the role of the Scottish archer Princess Merida from Brave. Addressing rumours surrounding the character's origins for the show, Kitsis and Horowitz stated, "we are sticking to the canon of the movie Brave in terms of who her parents are and where she came from, but post-movie is where our Once Upon a Time spin comes into play". On September 8, Meghan Ory was confirmed to be returning for multiple episodes of the season as Little Red Riding Hood / Ruby, while on September 15, Horowitz revealed that Jamie Chung would be returning as Mulan. Both Chung and Ory made their first appearance this season in "The Bear King".

The premiere episode of the season, "The Dark Swan", saw the return of David-Paul Grove as Doc, Faustine Di Bauda as Sleepy, Jeffrey Kaiser as Dopey, Michael Coleman as Happy, Mig Macario as Bashful, Raphael Alejandro as Roland, Timothy Webber as the Apprentice and Ingrid Torrance as the Severe Nurse who is revealed during the episode to be the show's version of Nurse Ratched from Ken Kesey's One Flew Over the Cuckoo's Nest, and introduced Lee Majdoub as Sir Kay and Mckenna Grace as young Emma. Towards the end of the month, David Anders was confirmed to be returning as Dr. Victor Frankenstein / Dr. Whale. The second episode of the season, "The Price", introduced Olivia Steele Falconer as Violet, a love interest for Henry.

On October 14, it was announced that Adam Croasdell was cast as Hook's father, who would appear in a flashback before the midseason finale, and was later revealed to be called Brennan. The fifth episode, "Dreamcatcher", saw the introduction of Ryan Robbins as Sir Morgan, Violet's father, and Guy Fauchon as Vortigan. The sixth episode of the season, "The Bear and the Bow", introduced Paul Telfer as Lord Macintosh, Marco D'Angelo as Lord MacGuffin and Josh Hallem as Lord Dingwall while the seventh episode, "Nimue", saw the introductions of Jason Simpson as Adda, Caroline Ford as Nimue, Darren Moore as Vortigan and Graham Verchere as a younger Merlin's Apprentice.

On October 27, Glenn Keogh and Caroline Morahan were cast as Merida's parents King Fergus and Queen Elinor respectively. During October and November 2015, multiple recurring characters from previous seasons were confirmed to be returning for the 100th episode, "Souls of the Departed", including Barbara Hershey as Cora, Robbie Kay as Peter Pan, Giancarlo Esposito as Magic Mirror / Sidney Glass, and Emma Caulfield as the Blind Witch, who was last seen during the first season episode "True North". The episode also introduced a recurring character, Hades (initially dubbed "The Distinguished Gentleman"), who was portrayed by Greg Germann. On February 22, it was announced that Michael Raymond-James will also return in the 100th episode as the deceased Neal Cassidy.

On November 10, it was announced that Victoria Smurfit would return as Cruella De Vil for numerous episodes during the second half of the season, beginning with the thirteenth episode, "Labor of Love". On November 16, it was announced that Bailee Madison would be returning in the same episode to reprise her role as a young Snow White, joined by newcomers Jonathan Whitesell and Kacey Rohl, who would be portraying Hercules and Megara, respectively. On December 3, 2015, the cast of the mid-season finale, "Swan Song", was revealed with Eric Keenleyside returning as Maurice, Belle's father and Oliver Bell being introduced as a young Killian. On December 4, it was announced that Rachel Shelley would be reprising her role as Milah, Rumplestiltskin's ex-wife and Hook's ex-lover, for at least one episode in the second half of the season. On December 8, it was announced that the character of Dorothy Gale (previously portrayed by Matreya Scarrwener) will be returning midway through the second half of the season to be portrayed by a new actress, as the character will be aged up to her late 20s-early 30s. On December 18, it was revealed that the recurring role had been recast to Teri Reeves, who would be making her first appearance in "Our Decay". On January 8, 2016, it was announced that the character of Gaston from Beauty and the Beast will be reappearing in an upcoming episode in the back-half of the season. This marks the character's first appearance since the season one episode "Skin Deep". Wes Brown was later revealed to be taking over the role from Sage Brocklebank. On February 9, it was announced that Ava Acres and Isabella Blake-Thomas were cast as young versions of Regina and Zelena, respectively. They appeared via flashbacks in the nineteenth episode, "Sisters". On February 18, it was announced that Costas Mandylor would be appearing as Captain Silver, a pirate from Hook's past. On February 23, it was announced that Rya Kihlstedt had been cast as Cleo, Emma's former mentor, in a flashback to a time before Emma's time as a bail bondswoman. On March 15, it was announced that Sam Witwer and Hank Harris would be appearing in the recurring roles of "Jacob" and "Nathaniel", with their roles continuing into the sixth season. They were later revealed to be portraying Mr. Hyde and Dr. Jekyll, respectively.

=== Promotion ===
The first half of the season used the tag-line "#DarkSwan" for the entire duration of its run.

== Ratings ==
Viewership and ratings per episode of Once Upon a Time season 5
No.	Title	Air date	Rating/share (18–49)	Viewers (millions)	DVR (18–49)	DVR viewers (millions)	Total (18–49)	Total viewers (millions)
1	"The Dark Swan"	September 27, 2015	1.8/5	5.93	1.1	2.44	2.9	8.37
2	"The Price"	October 4, 2015	1.8/5	5.38	1.2	2.67	3.0	8.05
3	"Siege Perilous"	October 11, 2015	1.6/5	5.28	1.1	—N/a	2.7	—N/a
4	"The Broken Kingdom"	October 18, 2015	1.6/5	4.92	1.0	—N/a	2.6	—N/a
5	"Dreamcatcher"	October 25, 2015	1.6/5	5.12	1.0	—N/a	2.6	—N/a
6	"The Bear and the Bow"	November 1, 2015	1.5/4	4.83	1.1	2.30	2.6	7.13
7	"Nimue"	November 8, 2015	1.6/4	4.88	1.0	—N/a	2.6	—N/a
8	"Birth"	November 15, 2015	1.6/5	4.85	0.9	—N/a	2.5	—N/a
9	"The Bear King"	November 15, 2015	1.6/5	4.85	0.9	—N/a	2.5	—N/a
10	"Broken Heart"	November 29, 2015	1.3/4	4.38	1.1	2.32	2.4	6.70
11	"Swan Song"	December 6, 2015	1.3/4	4.56	0.7	1.69	2.0	6.25
12	"Souls of the Departed"	March 6, 2016	1.3/4	4.01	0.9	2.09	2.2	6.11
13	"Labor of Love"	March 13, 2016	1.3/4	4.31	0.8	1.87	2.1	6.19
14	"Devil's Due"	March 20, 2016	1.1/4	3.54	0.8	1.88	1.9	5.42
15	"The Brothers Jones"	March 27, 2016	1.0/3	3.51	0.9	—N/a	1.9	—N/a
16	"Our Decay"	April 3, 2016	1.1/4	3.78	0.8	—N/a	1.9	—N/a
17	"Her Handsome Hero"	April 10, 2016	1.2/4	3.75	0.7	1.79	1.9	5.54
18	"Ruby Slippers"	April 17, 2016	1.2/4	3.76	0.7	1.81	1.9	5.56
19	"Sisters"	April 24, 2016	1.2/4	3.85	0.8	1.84	2.0	5.68
20	"Firebird"	May 1, 2016	1.2/4	3.77	0.7	1.72	1.9	5.48
21	"Last Rites"	May 8, 2016	1.1/4	3.75	0.8	1.81	1.9	5.55
22	"Only You"	May 15, 2016	1.2/4	4.07	0.7	—N/a	1.9	—N/a
23	"An Untold Story"	May 15, 2016	1.2/4	4.07	0.7	—N/a	1.9	—N/a
