= Siege Perilous (Once Upon a Time) =

- Once Upon a Time episode
- Episode no.: Season 5 Episode 3
- Directed by: Ralph Hemecker
- Written by: Jane Espenson
- Production code: 503
- Original air date: October 11, 2015

Guest appearances
- Lee Arenberg as Grumpy / Leroy; Beverley Elliott as Granny / Widow Lucas; Liam Garrigan as King Arthur; Sinqua Walls as Lancelot; Joana Metrass as Queen Guinevere

Episode chronology
← Previous "The Price"	Next → "The Broken Kingdom"
- Once Upon a Time season 5

"Siege Perilous" is the third episode of the fifth season of the American fantasy drama series Once Upon a Time, which aired on October 11, 2015.

In Camelot, David and King Arthur seek out an item that could help them communicate with an imprisoned Merlin, while in Storybrooke, Emma needs an item to free Excalibur. David and Arthur track down a thief among the displaced Arthurians.

== Plot ==
=== Opening sequence ===
Brocéliande, where the toadstool was located, is featured in the forest.

=== Event chronology ===
The Camelot events take place after "The Price" and before the flashbacks with the group from Storybrooke in "The Broken Kingdom. The Storybrooke events take place after "The Price".

=== In Camelot ===
While the residents of Storybrooke attempt to work on finding a way to free Merlin, Arthur shows up when David comes across an item in a book. The item they need, which is a special toadstool, called the Crimson Crown, that will let them communicate with Merlin, is located in the Forest of Eternal Night (Brocéliande), and David volunteers to go after the item, with Arthur joining him. Before they set out on their quest, Arthur corrects David's assumption that the different seat at the Round Table belongs to Arthur, and explains that it is vacant, as it belonged to Lancelot, until Lancelot betrayed him. David explains to Arthur about why he knows the story of the love triangle that involved the King, Guinevere and Lancelot. When Arthur asks how Lancelot is, David has to deliver the bad news that he is dead.

Meanwhile, Regina is arguing with Zelena after having given her back her voice. She tells Zelena that she can't take Robin's child away from him and that she can't keep painting herself a victim but promises to keep her baby safe, but can't say the same for Zelena.

As they reach a bridge that can only be used by one person, David volunteers to take the challenge and snatch the toadstool, but as he attempts to return he is obstructed by phantom knights that drag him underwater. Arthur pulls David to the surface and helps him get back to dry land. However, once there, they discover that the toadstool is no longer in David's bag. After returning empty-handed, Arthur offers David a seat at the Knights of the Round Table, except that he is offered Lancelot's seat (the Siege Perilous) instead of Percival's. However, later that evening, Mary Margaret comes across a very much alive Lancelot, who warns her that the Dark One isn't the only villain in Camelot - it's King Arthur. Lancelot says that Camelot is "not what it seems" and insinuates that King Arthur is evil. The insinuation is corroborated, as Guinevere joins Arthur at the Round Table, he takes out the toadstool that was supposedly lost to add to the reliquary, which holds the magic relics collected by the knights. While it brought Arthur no pleasure to lie to someone he sees as a good and noble man, he tells Guinevere that he must think of his kingdom first.

=== In Storybrooke ===
In the mines, Emma interrupts the dwarves' work by taking Happy's pickaxe. This infuriated the dwarves, causing them to take their complaints to David and Mary Margaret. They interrupt David, Mary Margaret and Regina from researching what they were searching for in Camelot: The Crimson Crown. Following the dwarves' complaints, David blames himself for not saving Emma. However, David is interrupted by Arthur, who tells David that key items from his camp, including a magic bean that would take the displaced Camelot residents home, is missing. David and Arthur stop by the pawnshop first to acquire an item, then begin their search at the Arthurians' camp, where David asks the campers to drink from the Chalice of Vengeance. This points him in the direction of the thief, revealed to be Arthur's squire, Grif, who immediately takes off on horseback, which leads to David and Arthur chasing Grif in David's pickup. David gives Arthur a crash course lesson in driving as he takes a piece of wood, using it as a makeshift joust, and knocks Grif off his horse. Grif later wakes up in the Sheriff's jail and admits that he was tired of how he was being treated, causing him to want to hurt the King. However, there was no magic bean found among the stolen items, but at the camp, David recognized the Crimson Crown on the ground and took it to Regina, who had also seen the question mark that she had handwritten on its illustration back in Camelot.

At Emma's basement, Emma takes the pickaxe and tries to break Excalibur out of the rock. The pickaxe breaks, and Rumplestiltskin's manifestation appears, telling Emma she needs a true hero in order to pull out the stone. Over at Granny's, Hook and Robin look at Zelena's sonogram when Granny hands Hook a meal, which he knew came from Emma, who wants to meet him on board the Jolly Roger for a lunch date. However, Hook is not impressed, telling Emma that she wasn't the real Emma he knew and loved. However, Emma explains she was doing this to test if he still loved with her, vanishing the moment he says that he loved who she had been.

Unfortunately, at the Storybrooke Sheriff station, it turns out King Arthur is not as honest as he seems; he found out that the heroes lied to him about Emma was the Dark One when they first entered Camelot and lied about the magic bean. Additionally, he has sinister plans to turn Storybrooke into the New Camelot, and believes that it is now impossible to return to their former realm. It's also revealed that Grif was a minion of Arthur, and in order to make sure that no one finds out his plans, Arthur convinces the squire to drink a vial of Agrabah Doom Viper poison. Grif does just that and disappears.

Back at the diner, Hook enlists Robin into a plan to check Emma's house and see what she had in the basement. As Granny hands Belle a dinner plate, Belle, to her surprise, notices her rose's petals being restored, a sign that Mr. Gold is waking up, but when she returns to the pawnshop, he's not there. At Emma's house, Emma has taken Gold - and Hook's sword - since it was the last item that Gold touched when before he became the Dark One, which is what is needed to heal him. Emma wakes Gold up, by performing a healing spell, destroying the blade. She reveals that his heart is a blank slate and promises to make him the purest hero. She hints that she wants him to pull Excalibur out of the stone, in order to vanquish the light.

== Production ==
Jeffrey Kasier (Dopey) was listed in the opening credits, but was absent in the episode.

== Reception ==
=== Ratings ===
The episode's numbers remained steady with a 1.6/5 among 18-49s with 5.28 million viewers tuning in, despite a slight drop from the previous episode, but good enough to win its timeslot.

=== Reviews ===
The episode was received positively by most critics, with many commenting on Liam Garrigan's role as King Arthur in the episode.

Hillary Busis of Entertainment Weekly said, "Okay, look. I had Arthur pegged as sketchy the moment he seemed to be okay with Charming going over the water by himself, but I should’ve started side-eyeing him when he gleefully suggested that Guinevere and Snow should be pitted against each other. Charming would never!" Amy Ratcliffe of IGN said of the episode, "Tonight's Once put some important pawns into place with Arthur's villainy (and Lancelot) and Gold's return to the world. Those two points have promise. Aside from that, the episode meandered. David and Arthur's chemistry was flat, and Emma was robotic." Ratcliffe gave the episode a 7.0 rating out of 10.

In a review from Rickey.org, Nick Roman said, "“Siege Perilous” is certainly as good a starting point as any for Once Upon A Time to once again explore what makes a hero." Gwen Ihnat of The A.V. Club gave the episode a positive review, giving it a B+. She notes "We have writer/producer Jane Espenson to thank for this episode’s script, her first of this season." Christine Orlando of TV Fanatic gave the episode a 4.0 out of 5 stars.
