= Firebird (Once Upon a Time) =

- Once Upon a Time episode
- Episode no.: Season 5 Episode 20
- Directed by: Ron Underwood
- Written by: Jane Espenson
- Production code: 520
- Original air date: May 1, 2016

Guest appearances
- Emma Caulfield as the Blind Witch; Greg Germann as Hades; Geoff Gustafson as Stealthy; Robbie A. Kay as Malcolm/Peter Pan; Rya Kihlstedt as Cleo Fox; Victoria Smurfit as Cruella De Vil/Cruella Feinberg

Episode chronology
← Previous "Sisters"	Next → "Last Rites"
- Once Upon a Time season 5

"Firebird" is the twentieth episode of the fifth season of the American fantasy drama series Once Upon a Time, which aired on May 1, 2016.

In this episode, Emma and Hook prove that they are truly in love, but Hook decides to stay in the Underworld; and Mr. Gold tricks Pan. In flashbacks, Emma forces a bail bonds person to help her.

== Plot ==
=== Opening sequence ===
Emma's yellow bug drives through the red-tinted forest.

=== Event chronology ===
The Land Without Magic events take place in 2009, eight years after "Save Henry" and before "Pilot". The last flashback scene takes place at Boston one year later in 2010. The Underworld events take place after "Sisters".

=== In the Characters' Past ===
In 2009 Maine, At Chantley's Lobster House, the last location where both baby Emma and Pinocchio arrived in 1983, an adult Emma has begun a quest to find her birth family, and joined by a bondswoman named Cleo Fox, who has been tracking her down since Emma robbed a few convenience stores. Over time, both Cleo and Emma bond, and helps Emma gain access to records that may help her, but come up empty handed. When they arrived in Phoenix, Emma attempts to escape as she is wanted for robberies there only to have Cleo talk her out of it. When they stop at a government record office, Emma breaks in to get information but Cleo helps her escape by breaking a window and jumping out but a shard of glass cut into her stomach. As Emma helps a dying Cleo, she tells Emma the only family member she has left is her daughter that she gave up a ten years ago. Cleo then dies after telling Emma to run away.

A year later (2010 Boston) and after Cleo has passed, Emma, who is now a bondswoman, finds Cleo's biological daughter Tasha Morris, who now works at a department store. Emma collected information about Cleo so that Tasha could know more about her birth mother, and she is sad but appreciative. Before she leaves, Emma purchases the red leather jacket (later referred to by Hook as her "armor") that would become part of her trademark wardrobe.

=== In the Underworld ===
In the moments after Regina encouraged Zelena to pursue a relationship with Hades, the move has the outsiders, especially Hook, unhappy with this new development. But before tensions start to reach a boiling point, Hades appears and informs them that Zelena had been kidnapped by Gold and Peter Pan. A note Hades produces makes clear Gold and Pan are using Zelena as leverage in a trade deal for the contract on Gold's unborn child. Hades asks Emma for help by arranging a deal in which she will help him get Zelena back in exchange for Hades erasing the outsiders' names from their gravestones so they can leave the Underworld. At the diner, Hades closes up the place so he can meet with Gold and Pan. Zelena, who has been cuffed and prevented from using magic, is with them. Hades agrees to Gold's demands and rips up the contract, only for Pan to reveal that he will take Zelena's heart as part of his plan to return to the living. As Pan attempts to rip out Zelena's heart, Emma breaks in through the back door and blasts him with Light Magic, stopping Pan. Gold and Pan leave separately during the confrontation, and without complete satisfaction. As Hades and Zelena are reunited, Hades frees Zelena by removing the cuff, and the two share a kiss. Suddenly Hades' heart begins to beat once again, resulting in a new level of fulfillment in Hades' vision for a "normal" life and leaving the Underworld with Zelena. As part of the arranged deal with Emma along with Hades' new freedom, a portal to Storybrooke can open which will close at sunset. As promised, Hades wipes the outsiders' names off the gravestones. Before the portal opens, Emma attempts to give half her heart to Hook so he can live again and travel through the portal safely, but the process doesn't work. Hades explains that Hook's soul might not be able to return to a decaying body, because he has been in the Underworld too long. Emma's insistence on a way to bring Hook back leads to Hades telling of a rumor of the only time when someone was able to bring the dead back to life from the Underworld: the story of Orpheus and Eurydice. According to what worked in that tale, Hook must acquire Ambrosia, the food of the gods, to restore his body and be reunited safely with his body; but in order to get to the Ambrosia, Emma has to go deep into the Underworld, and face a test to determine whether her love for Hook is true, by testing her heart. Before Emma and Hook go on their quest, Hades removes Emma's heart so that she can bring it with her for the test that she and Hook will face. The others promise her that they will wait for their return, but must leave by sunset in case Emma and Hook do not succeed.

Around the same time, Pan demands that Gold help him get a heart before he leaves, and Pan offers his son Pandora's Box, in exchange for a heart, which will keep Belle safe on the return home. And as the others wait for Emma and Hook, Henry, and Regina decide that they should help continue helping the trapped residents resolve their unfinished business. Regina also convinces Robin to give his baby to Zelena so she and Hades can take care of her, but after he steps aside for a breath of fresh air, Gold shows up and takes his heart. Meanwhile, Henry, in his role as the Author, successfully helps the resident complete their "unfinished business," which will allow them to leave. However, Cruella and the Blind Witch lock the outsiders in the library, in their plot to take over the Underworld in Hades' absence, and to keep them away from the portal. Regina suspects the Blind Witch had help from Hades since she's doesn't usually cast that strong magic. As Emma and Hook continue the search for ambrosia, Emma physically weighs her heart to see if she is worthy as she places it on a scale but the weight is increasing her pain, and even Hook tries to grab it but he starts to catch fire. This has left Emma with two choices, saving her heart or Hook, and when she chooses the latter, a door opens as she is deemed worthy, only to discover that the tree had been cut down, and the leftover Ambrosia had been dead for a long time. The two suspect that Hades lied to them to prevent them from returning to Storybrooke.

As the portal starts to close, Hades convinces a reluctant Zelena to go through it as the rumbling starts to make the ceiling fall above them. Knowing that there is no other way to bring him back to the living, Hook wants Emma to go on without him and decides that it's time to say goodbye and vows not to let her be his unfinished business. Emma agrees not to put her emotional armor back up once they are separated. When Emma returns, she's on to Hades' and the Blind Witch's scheme to leave the outsiders in the Underworld, and she and Regina use their magic to free everyone, while Henry leaves behind the "Once Upon a Time" storybook with the details on the “unfinished business” of all the remaining Underworld residents. Finally, Gold places Robin's heart into Pan, only for Pan to discover that Gold has tricked him: Gold had returned Robin's heart to him earlier, while Pan was distracted. Instead, he had put a wineskin that he had filled with water from the River of Lost Souls and glamoured as Robin's heart into Pan's body. Gold tells a horrified Pan that he did this to keep him from getting the happy ending that a villain like him never deserved, as Pan dissolves into the River of Lost Souls. Then, Gold uses Pandora's Box to contain Belle safely, before leaving through the portal. Afterwards, all people, except for David and Emma, enter the portal. A heartbroken Emma explains to David that she needs to protect her loved ones. David understands and then takes Emma through the portal, just as it closes.

== Production ==
Ginnifer Goodwin is credited but not featured in this episode.

== Reception ==
Andrea Towers of Entertainment Weekly gave it a positive review: "It's deals and betrayal on Once Upon a Time as we approach the final two weeks of Season 5. So it's fitting, naturally, that we pick up with Emma (and everyone else) asking WHAT?"

In a review from Rickey.org, Nick Roman said, "So...did that really just happen? Once Upon a Time has taken it easy on the character deaths (well, at least the major ones) in recent times, but “Firebird” suggests this might really be the last we see of the man who, for the most part, is the show's de facto romantic lead. And if that's the case, then this episode could be a real turning point for the series."

Christine Orlando of TV Fanatic gave the episode a 4.6 out of 5.

Gwen Inhat of The AV Club gave the episode a B+. In her review she stated "Once Upon a Time likes to throw out a lot of platitudinal concepts like “trust,” and who can be trusted. It's a veritable trust smorgasbord this episode, as allies form that shouldn't, while villains turn on everyone because if we know anything from these five seasons of OUAT, we know that's what they do."
