= The Price (Once Upon a Time) =

- Once Upon a Time episode
- Episode no.: Season 5 Episode 2
- Directed by: Romeo Tirone
- Written by: Andrew Chambliss; Dana Horgan
- Production code: 502
- Original air date: October 4, 2015

Guest appearances
- Lee Arenberg as Grumpy / Leroy; Beverley Elliott as Granny / Widow Lucas; Liam Garrigan as King Arthur; Andrew Jenkins as Percival; Joana Metrass as Queen Guinevere; Olivia Steele-Falconer as Violet

Episode chronology
| ← Previous "The Dark Swan" | Next → "Siege Perilous" |
- Once Upon a Time season 5

"The Price" is the second episode of the fifth season of the American fantasy drama series Once Upon a Time, which aired on October 4, 2015.

In this episode, Regina must prove her mettle as a force for good as she tries to protect Emma, while King Arthur and Queen Guinevere throw a celebration for the transplanted heroes that turns deadly. Back in Storybrooke, six weeks after the events in Camelot, Regina, Mary Margaret, David, Leroy, and King Arthur save Robin Hood's life.

== Plot ==
=== Opening sequence ===
Merlin's Tree is featured in the forest.

=== Event chronology ===
The Camelot and Storybrooke events take place after "The Dark Swan".

=== In Camelot ===
The Storybrooke residents are welcomed with open arms in Camelot, and King Arthur and Queen Guinevere announce that they will throw a ball for their guests. In the meantime, they find that Merlin has been imprisoned in a tree, and the only person who can free him, according to Merlin's prophecy, is the Savior. However, the Storybrooke transplants worry that Emma will become darker if she uses her magic, so Regina lies to King Arthur and says that she is the true Savior. Regina and Emma search Merlin's tower for clues, but come up empty and are running out of time as the evening's ball is approaching. Prior the dance, Percival visits Regina and woos her with a necklace to wear and she puts it on, but later decides that she cannot go to the ball, claiming that she needs to continue her research to free Merlin. When she later admits that she does not know how to dance, Mary Margaret helps her find a suitable gown while David teaches her how to dance.

That evening at the ball, everyone makes their grand entrances and the couples dance. Henry has developed a crush on a girl named Violet and, after encouragement from David, introduces himself and shares his iPod Nano with Violet. Leroy is able to convince Belle to stop worrying about Rumpelstiltskin and gets her to join the dance. However, the event is about to end early when Percival reveals that he had witnessed Regina slaughter his entire family as a child. He also reveals that he knows that she is the Evil Queen and not the Savior, a fact he confirmed earlier by observing her through the enchanted necklace, and that he kept all of this from Arthur because he would have prevented him from killing Regina. Percival tries to kill Regina, but Robin steps in and fights him, only to be stabbed in the process before David kills Percival. Regina is desperate to save Robin, but her magic does not work due to an enchantment spell placed on Percival's sword. This prompts Regina to ask Emma to help save Robin by using her magic, but Hook does not want Emma to trigger her dark side. Meanwhile, King Arthur does not blame them for Percival's death, saying that his action was inexcusable, and admits that he suspected Regina's identity, but says that Camelot is a place of second chances. He later confesses to Guinevere that he thinks that there is something suspicious about the new arrivals, but he has to trust them, as they are his only hope of freeing Merlin and finding the missing piece of Excalibur. Emma eventually decides to help Regina despite the risk, but the magic triggers her vision of Rumpelstiltskin, who warns her that a price has to be paid if she saves Robin's life. Emma ignores the manifestation and uses her magic to save Robin, but in the process it triggers the darkness in her, as forewarned by Hook, with Emma's hand beginning to resemble that of a Dark One.

=== In Storybrooke ===
The new curse has the residents becoming more fearful of Emma, and the Dwarfs attempt to escape the town; Dopey steps over the town line and is immediately turned into a tree. Back in town, Hook asks Belle for advice on how to deal with loving Emma, who is now the Dark One. Belle tells Hook, "It's far easier to hate the Dark One than it is to love one." At the marina, Henry summons Emma and apologizes for whatever happened in Camelot; Emma explains she doesn't blame him. Regina finds them, tells Henry to get far away from Emma, then tries to convince her that she could save Storybrooke; Emma strongly disagrees.

The residents of Storybrooke discover that Arthur and the Camelot empire has been transported back with them, and David admits to Arthur that Emma had been the Dark One all along. While Robin is working in the woods, helping the displaced Arthurians, he is grabbed by a ghostly, winged entity and taken away.

Meanwhile, a lonely Hook summons Emma because he loves her too much to stay away. Emma brings Hook to her new house, where he notices a locked door. Emma then attempts to seduce Hook; but when true love's kiss fails to break the darkness's hold on her, (Note: In "Birth" and "Broken Heart," it is revealed that True Love's Kiss did not work because Hook is also a Dark One.) he rejects her. Emma is mad that he cannot accept her for who she is now, and he is equally angry at her for keeping what happened at Camelot a secret, though Emma tells him that giving it away would be "no fun."

Belle has learned that the monster that took Robin was a Fury. Someone had used magic in Camelot to save Robin and did not pay the price, which is a life, and the monster has arrived to collect Robin's soul as payment. It will return to the Underworld when the moon reaches its zenith, but can be stopped if someone gives their life in his place. Regina confronts Emma, believing that she had summoned the Fury, but Emma reveals that Regina was the one responsible for its appearance. That night near the pond, the Fury begins pulling out Robin's soul, and Charon the boatman appears as the moon reaches its zenith. Regina sacrifices herself for Robin, and is joined by Mary Margaret, David, Leroy and Arthur. As all five band together, they successfully pull Robin from the Fury (and since the price of a single soul was equally divided among them), which disappears back into the underworld with Charon. While everyone celebrates this latest victory at Granny's, a worried Mary Margaret notes that if they win, Emma will lose. At Granny's, Henry introduces himself to Violet again and shows her what a jukebox is, and plays the same song he had played in Camelot, which, somehow, seems familiar to her. At her house, Emma opens the locked door and goes downstairs, at the behest of Rumplestiltskin's manifestation, revealing the stone with the sword Excalibur in it. Rumplestiltskin, the manifestation of her darkness, says that she can make it whole again and use it to vanquish all of the light forever. Emma tries to pull the sword from the stone but fails, being repelled by the sword's magic. After this failed attempt, the Dark One taunts her, and tells her that in order to complete the task, she will have to pay the price, and it will cost someone dearly.

== Reception ==
=== Ratings ===
The episode's numbers remained steady with a 1.8/5 among 18-49s with 5.38 million viewers tuning in, despite a 3 percent drop from the previous episode.

=== Reviews ===
The episode was met with excellent reviews.

Hillary Busis of Entertainment Weekly said, "What happened during those six weeks in Camelot? I'm glad you asked because tonight Once Upon A Time took the first step in peeling back the layers of that mystery. And of course, like all good Enchanted Forest stories, it involved a ball."

Amy Ratcliffe of IGN said of the episode, "Tonight's Once Upon a Time moved the story along on several fronts – we learned a little more about the curse, the state of Merlin, and the danger of Excalibur. But characters acted, well, out of character. For example, Snow and Charming should have been more concerned about Emma in Camelot and less worried about teaching Regina to dance (as cute as that was)." Ratcliffe gave the episode a 7.7 rating out of 10.

In a review from Rickey.org, Nick Roman said, "while last week's premiere was better than “The Price”, this is the most excited I've been for an early season storyline for Once Upon A Time in a while. This was just plain fun television, with the contrast between the flashbacks and present day, as well as the trouble with the Fury, the developments in Camelot (Dancing! A grand ball! Wizards stuck in trees, just like on Game of Thrones!). Count me all-in on Once Upon A Time Season 5."

Gwen Ihnat of The A.V. Club gave the episode a positive review, giving it a B. She notes "Sure, there's a price for everything, and in a perfect fairy-tale world, no one gets away scot-free from the consequences of their actions. Once Upon A Time is deftly drawing on the show's own history to show how much of a problem that will be for Regina, the only one left who can save the town. She still has enough power to silence both Zelena and Emma this episode, and save Sneezy from his statue state with just a wave of her hand. But even that path isn't as interesting as seeing the town take on one of their own, in a far more intriguing plot development than fighting Cruella De Vil."

Christine Orlando of TV Fanatic gave the episode a 4.5 out of 5 stars.
