= The Bear and the Bow =

- Once Upon a Time episode
- Episode no.: Season 5 Episode 6
- Directed by: Ralph Hemecker
- Written by: Andrew Chambliss & Tze Chun
- Production code: 506
- Original air date: November 1, 2015

Guest appearances
- Liam Garrigan as King Arthur; Amy Manson as Merida; Elliot Knight as Merlin; Joana Metrass as Queen Guinevere; Paul Telfer as Lord Macintosh; Sinqua Walls as Lancelot

Episode chronology
← Previous "Dreamcatcher"	Next → "Nimue"
- Once Upon a Time season 5

"The Bear and the Bow" is the sixth episode of the fifth season of the American fantasy drama series Once Upon a Time, which aired on November 1, 2015.

In this episode, a chance encounter with Merlin, David, Hook, and Belle in Camelot gives Merida new hope in her quest to save her triplet brothers from the United clans of DunBroch, as Merida brings Belle along on a dangerous journey that culminates with an invaluable lesson in bravery. In Storybrooke, Regina, Mary Margaret, and David discover the spell that would allow one of Merlin's chosen to communicate with him, but they soon become suspicious of Arthur after he fails to reach the missing sorcerer, and when Emma commands Merida to kill Belle in hopes of forcing Mr. Gold's heroic transformation, Gold must use his courage to fight for Belle's life.

== Plot ==
=== Opening sequence ===
An arrow from Merida is shot in the forest, piercing the glass in the "O".

=== Event chronology ===
The Camelot events take place after "Dreamcatcher" and before "Nimue". The DunBroch events take place two years after King Fergus' story in "The Bear King" and before the events surrounding Merida's coronation in the same episode. The Enchanted Forest events at Granny's Diner take place after "Dreamcatcher". The Storybrooke events take place after "Dreamcatcher".

=== In Camelot, the Enchanted Forest and DunBroch ===
Six weeks earlier in the Camelot dungeon, David, Hook, Merlin and Belle waste no time at all in defeating Arthur's guards, with Hook impressed by Merlin's ability to see the future. They then reach the cell where Lancelot and Merida are being held, with Merlin telling the others that it is enchanted. Belle then gives Merlin a book of spells and makes the bars disappear. Merida tells the rescuers that Arthur took the wisps which she needed to find her brothers, so Merlin suggests that they need to come up with another way to find them. When Belle asks Merida why she was in the dungeon, Merida tells her that the wisps led her to the sea, but the boat she hid out in belonged to Arthur, and that when he found her he then threw her in the cell. Merida then knocks Belle out with a rock and hours later Belle awakes to find herself in a rowboat with Merida. Belle learns that Merida needs Belle's magic to find her brothers. She further explains that the clans kidnapped her brothers so they can force her to relinquish the throne as she is not married.

Merida and Belle later stumble upon a witch's home, where they sneak inside to use a cauldron to do a locator spell, which conjures up a futuristic vision of a Southern moor where three men are vying for Merida's hand in marriage, followed by her three brothers brought in by their captors who remove the bags off their heads. Unfortunately, the United Clans also plan to kills Merida's brothers and take DunBroch from Merida. Belle tells Merida its time to change fate, so Belle reads the scroll. As Belle watches Merida practices her archery skills, she's just finished up creating the potion, which will turn Merida into a bear so she can save her brothers. Belle is skeptical about using the spell to change fate, but Merida says otherwise. As they reach the United Clans, Merida threatens to take them out but as she drinks the potion, Belle told her it wasn't the actual potion, then tells Merida that she should have faith in her own fate without magic. When the United Clans' archers aim their arrows at her brothers and fire, Merida showed them who was in charge by aiming and firing her arrow at the executioners' arrows, destroying them, before bluffing her way out of a swordfight with them. The clans then bow down to Merida to acknowledge her as the Queen of DunBroch. With that out of the way, Merida lets Belle return to Camelot to join the others.

Finally, back in Camelot, Merlin looks at a candy bar when Emma arrives, and Emma remembers Merlin from their encounter in the real world. Merlin reminds Emma of his warning not to pull Excalibur, in order to protect her loved ones, and continues to stress that because of the darkness now within her, it is imperative for her to heed this warning more than ever before.

=== In Storybrooke ===
In the Present Day, Regina informs Mary Margaret that Emma has slipped out information about Merlin, then confirms that she has the Crimson Crown which can be used to summon Merlin, but it has to be the one that was chosen by the sorcerer. When Belle suggests Gold, believing that he is no worse than Emma, everyone else turns a deaf ear saying it's a risk they have to take if Gold gets hurt, and a furious Belle storms out. Out in the woods, Gold stares at the chipped tea cup in his hands and says "Forgive Me, Belle," then kisses it and breaks the glass in order to take the shards to free himself from the ropes. When Emma arrives to the spot to see if Gold has made any progress, they discovered Gold has escaped. Emma then forces Merida to find him, and threatens the archer by destroying her heart by having Merida kill Belle in order to turn Gold into the hero she needs to release Excalibur. As for Belle, she uses a street map to find out where Emma is keeping Gold, then hears a noise from the elevator, prompting her to take a weapon. She opens it and it's Gold, who warns Belle that Merida's after her by using Gold to turn him into a hero but in order to do that Emma has made Belle a target, and the two race back to the pawn shop to find magic.

Around the same time, Regina conjures up a potion with Arthur watching, telling her that David explained everything, then Regina gives Arthur the mushroom. Arthur hesitates and says its best to do it alone, and adds that Merlin only delivered prophecies when he was alone with him. David then tells everyone to step aside so he can be alone, but after Arthur tosses the Crown into the fire instead the cauldron, he tells them the spell did not work.

In between the events, Zelena, annoyed with Regina sending healthy food and reading "What to Expect When You're Expecting" at the hospital, is interrupted by Emma, who then materialized the Wicked Witch to her home for onion rings and take out food, as Zelena asks Emma about why she's important. Emma shows Zelena the Apprentice's wand, as Zelena was the only person to wield it and lived, then offers Zelena freedom and protection in exchange for her assistance, but Zelena tells Emma that she is a bad influence as her darkness is already causing Henry to resent her, and a broken heart can't be forgiven. Claiming to be busy with own family problems, Zelena asks to be sent back to her cell; despite this, Emma tells Zelena that she will take the deal soon.

Meanwhile, Belle tells Gold that the coast is clear but before they can make a run for it, Gold tells Belle about his past in the Enchanted Forest during the events of the Ogre Wars and why he sees himself as a coward, but Belle now sees Gold as a hero. When they make it back to the pawn shop, Merida shows up to shoot arrows at Belle, saying that he can't resist the magic. When Merida breaks open the door she walks into a mirror but after she sees their reflection Belle yanks the rug from under her and they escape with a bag containing a potion, then drive to the town line so they can use it, but Belle, worried that Emma will still go after them, demands that she be left out of the car. After she gets out, Belle tells Gold that he still a coward and walks away. Belle then runs into Merida, who then drinks a potion and she turns into a bear and starts chasing Belle, but before she can convince Merida to listen the bear is distracted by Gold, who told Belle to go so he can fight Merida. As the bear sniffs down Gold, he uses an antidote powder to restore Merida back to normal. Despite telling Belle that he didn't know how it worked, Gold told Belle that she saved him. The three return to the basement, where Gold agrees to pull Excalibur in exchange for Merida's heart and find out where her brothers are. Gold then pulls Excalibur then places it at Emma's feet, only to have Emma warn Gold that there are heroes around Storybrooke that haven't stopped her, but Gold tells her they're not him.

As for the spell, Regina told Mary Margaret that the spell did work, and as suspected by David, Arthur lied to them, believing that he did not want to contact Merlin. Regina believes the only other person who was chosen by Merlin was the Author, meaning Henry, who is brought in to help them, adding that Emma is still inside the darkness and they can save her. Henry then places the mushroom in the cauldron and an image of Merlin appears, informing them that things are worse than he feared. Regina sourly notes they've gotten Merlin's "voicemail". Merlin says the only way the Dark One can be defeated is by the Nimue, but before he can go any further, Merlin says the Dark One has found him already, and the message is cut short, leading the others to believe that Emma has done something to Merlin.

== Production ==
Sean Maguire was listed in the credits but was not featured in this episode, while Mckenna Grace was featured in flashback footage but was not credited in the episode.

The episode's title was also the original title for the 2012 film Brave, where the characters Merida and her triplet younger brothers originate. The remaining main characters from Brave, King Fergus, Queen Elinor and the Witch, later appeared in "The Bear King".

== Reception ==
The episode's numbers remained steady for a fifth week with a 1.5/4 among 18-49s, but slipped a tenth of a point with 4.83 million viewers tuning in, mostly affected by the World Series on Fox and Sunday Night Football on NBC.

=== Reviews ===
The episode received positive reviews.

Andrea Towers of Entertainment Weekly notes in her assessment of the review, "Bravery was given out in spades tonight on Once Upon a Time, and while Arthur continued to prove he wasn't the world's most trustworthy member of the Scooby gang, two of Once's most underused characters — as well as a relationship that hasn't been fully explored since last season — got some time to shine."

In a review from Rickey.org, Nick Roman said, "“The Bear and the Bow” is a really compelling episode for Once Upon a Time, and I admit that I wasn't necessarily expecting it to be. However, the separate trajectories towards heroism and self-confidence for both Merida and Gold were genuinely engrossing... The plot (The deception from Arthur) thickens, and it didn't feel like part of the same episode as the rest of the story, considering how singularly focused it is on the Gold/Merida arcs. But it was necessary if next week's episode is going to kick off the search for this mysterious person. So I can't really complain about it. All in all, I thought “The Bear and the Bow” delivered, as Once Upon a Time continues what is gradually becoming one of my favorite first-halves of any season in some time."

Gwen Ihnat of The A.V. Club gave the episode positive review, giving it a B−. However, she pointed out that "I'm having trouble with Merida's entry into OUAT season five because I'm just not that invested in the character. Not that she isn't a plucky little heroine—oh God, she's plucky!—but because her own backstory and mythology doesn't offer is a lot. Snow is now a terrible character, but her story was always rich with possibilities: the apple, the mirror, the queen, the hunter, even the dwarves. Everyone knows that story, even if they don't know they know it. But if you didn't check out Brave in the theater a few summers ago—which you probably wouldn't do unless you were a small child or had a small child yourself— you would have no idea why there are bears running around all over the place this episode."

Christine Orlando of TV Fanatic gave the episode a 4.3 out of 5 stars.
