= The Brothers Jones =

- Once Upon a Time episode
- Episode no.: Season 5 Episode 15
- Directed by: Eagle Egilsson
- Written by: Jerome Schwartz; David H. Goodman
- Production code: 515
- Original air date: March 27, 2016

Guest appearances
- Bernard Curry as Liam Jones; Greg Germann as Hades; Costas Mandylor as Captain Silver; Victoria Smurfit as Cruella De Vil/Cruella Feinberg; Timothy Webber as The Apprentice

Episode chronology
| ← Previous "Devil's Due" | Next → "Our Decay" |
- Once Upon a Time season 5

"The Brothers Jones" is the fifteenth episode of the fifth season of the American fantasy drama series Once Upon a Time, which aired on March 27, 2016.

In this episode, Emma is suspicious of Liam when Hook is reunited with him; and Henry finds the quill and ink. In flashbacks, Hades makes a deal with Liam.

== Plot ==
=== Opening sequence ===
The Jewel of the Realm ship appears in the red-tinted forest.

=== Event chronology ===
The Enchanted Forest events take place after the first flashback scene of "Swan Song" and before "Good Form". The Underworld events take place after "Devil's Due".

=== In the Characters' Past ===
In the early years of the Enchanted Forest, Liam and Killian are miserable and under servitude after their father sold them into slavery. Liam is hoping that he and Killian can escape by joining the Navy. Unfortunately, Killian becomes drunk and gambles away their prospects. Although Liam is still able to join, he vows to not leave without his brother. Some time later, their ship crosses paths with a hurricane en route to a sought-after treasure described as "The Eye of the Storm." Knowing the dangers of venturing into the hurricane, Liam holds a successful mutiny against the crew's Captain Silver. Soon after the mutiny, Hades appears in the Captain's quarters and makes a deal with Liam: Hades will take the souls of the men on the ship besides those of Liam and his brother in return for the Eye of the Storm (which will guarantee the survivors a spot in the Royal Navy). Liam agrees and sails into the hurricane that kills the crew but spares the Jones brothers. Liam gives the treasure to the Royal Navy and he and Killian are declared heroes, receive positions in the Navy, and given a ship: The Jewel of the Realm, which would later be known as the Jolly Roger.

=== In the Underworld ===
In the Underworld, Cruella and Henry are searching for the Author's quill. They split up and Henry notices a glimmering light, which leads him to the now-deceased Apprentice. The Apprentice explains that Henry is his unfinished business, and that he won't be able to move on until he knows that Henry will make the right decision. At Henry's behest, the Apprentice tells him that the quill is located in the Sorcerer's mansion, but warns Henry against using its power to resurrect Cruella.

Meanwhile, Emma uses her magic to heal Hook, but when she tried to kiss him Hook turns away, blaming himself for becoming dark. The two are then interrupted by Killian's dead brother Liam. Liam explains rumors of a book with the power to defeat Hades. Emma assumes it to be the Underworld equivalent of the "Once Upon a Time" book. Everyone searches Mary Margaret's apartment, but come up empty. Concerned that Emma is not good enough for his brother, Liam tells Emma that Hook and her should break up. Moments later, Henry returns and suggests they look for the book in the Sorcerer’s mansion. However, the key is located in the Sheriff's office which is occupied by James. After they leave, Hades visits Liam in a tavern and reveals that he knows of their plans. Hades blackmails Liam to destroy the Storybook pages concerning him, threatening to reveal Liam's unfinished business to his brother. At the Sheriff's office, Snow and David find the key, only to encounter Cruella. While Mary Margaret hides, David pretends to be his brother James (who Cruella was expecting).

At the mansion, Emma, Regina, Hook, and Liam look for the storybook while Henry searches for the quill. Unknown to everyone, Liam has found the book and rips out the pages about Hades. At the same time, Henry rediscovers the quill. Meanwhile, David turns down Cruella's advances and learns that James has resented his brother for staying with their mother during their separate childhoods while James lived with his new father, the king.

The others find the book and notice its missing pages. While they keep looking, Liam tosses the pages into the well of Cocytus, outside the Mansion. Emma suspects Liam of lying and tells Hook, who refuses to believe her, and suggests that they break up after escaping the Underworld. After Emma storms off, Hook notices that Liam has ink on his fingers, and Captain Silver and the deceased crew appear. They kidnap the Jones brothers and reveal that Liam sold their lives for the Eye of the Storm. Liam and Killian are taken to the edge of the Underworld where they would be sent to an even worse afterlife. However, Hades appears, blows Captain Silver into the Phlegethon, the River of Fire, and offers Liam a chance to escape, pleased that he destroyed the pages. However, Liam refuses to go with Hades, who angrily throws Liam toward the flames. Hook tries to pull his brother up, but is unable to. Liam lets go and falls into the fiery abyss. Despite this, a boat appears with Liam, who is ready to enter a better afterlife (his unfinished business was making peace with Killian). Seeing this, Hades disappears, promising to make Hook pay for that. The deceased crew is also able to leave. Liam also tells Hook he was wrong about Emma; she does want what's best for him. Hook returns to see Emma and explains what has happened, revealing he now wants to return with her.

Henry tells David that he has found the quill, but admits that he plans to use the quill only in a positive way, starting with re-writing the missing Hades story that Liam ripped out. Meanwhile, Hades retrieves the missing pages from the Cocytus River. The pages show that he has some sort of connection with Zelena.

== Production ==
- Emilie de Ravin, Rebecca Mader, Sean Maguire, and Robert Carlyle are not featured in this episode.

== Reception ==
The episode was met with mixed reviews.

In a review from Rickey.org, Nick Roman said, "“The Brothers Jones” is a strong episode for characterization on Once Upon A Time, since it illustrates how several characters have both matured and acquired a much-needed sense of self-awareness. I’ve liked other episodes better this season, but I would argue this was one of the best when it comes to pure character study."

Andrea Towers of Entertainment Weekly gave it a good review, noting the scenes with Victoria Smurfit are the best part of the episode.

Christine Orlando of TV Fanatic gave the episode a 2.5 out of 5 the lowest so far in the series.

In a review from "TV. com", the episode was given a 7.5 out of 10.
