= The Broken Kingdom =

- Once Upon a Time episode
- Episode no.: Season 5 Episode 4
- Directed by: Alrick Riley
- Written by: David H. Goodman & Jerome Schwartz
- Production code: 504
- Original air date: October 18, 2015

Guest appearances
- Liam Garrigan as King Arthur; Amy Manson as Merida; Sinqua Walls as Lancelot; Andrew Jenkins as Percival; Joana Metrass as Queen Guinevere; Dalila Bela as Young Guinevere; Ehren Kassam as Young Kay; Abby Ross as Young Emma (uncredited)

Episode chronology
← Previous "Siege Perilous"	Next → "Dreamcatcher"
- Once Upon a Time season 5

"The Broken Kingdom" is the fourth episode of the fifth season of the American fantasy drama series Once Upon a Time, which aired on October 18, 2015.

In this episode, Mary Margaret decides to take matters into her own hands when she fails to convince David about Lancelot's warning about King Arthur, and Hook’s unwavering love for Emma provides a slight possibility of succeeding in her struggle against the unrelenting voice of Rumplestiltskin, while in Storybrooke, Emma unleashes a weapon to unleash Excalibur by using a brave soul to do the task. Back in Camelot's past, Guinevere sets out with Lancelot on a quest to locate the other half of Excalibur, as she begins to sense Arthur's obsession with making Excalibur whole.

== Plot ==
=== Opening sequence ===
Merlin's tower is featured in the forest.

=== Event chronology ===
The opening scene in Camelot with young Arthur and Guinevere takes place some years after the opening scene of "Dreamcatcher". The Camelot scene where King Arthur shows Excalibur to his subjects, takes place shortly after the opening scene of "The Dark Swan". The Camelot flashback scenes focusing on the hunt for the Dark One's Dagger, takes place 33 years before the events with the group from Storybrooke, three years before the casting of the Dark Curse, and after the scene where Arthur shows Excalibur to his subjects. The Camelot events with the group from Storybrooke take place after "Siege Perilous". The episode displays these events as taking place five years after the scenes focusing on the hunt for the dagger, meaning that the time period is from the point of view of Camelot people and does not include the 28-year duration of the first Dark Curse. The Enchanted Forest flashback scenes at the Vault of the Dark One take place immediately before "Heroes and Villains". The Enchanted Forest flashback scenes at Granny's Diner take place after "The Dark Swan" and before "Dreamcatcher". The Storybrooke events take place after "Siege Perilous".

=== In the Characters' Past ===
During Camelot's early years, Arthur was a stable boy motivated to fulfill his prophecy of finding Excalibur at an early age, which he would follow through as an adult years later. While he proclaimed to his kingdom that he had found the entire sword, Arthur, like Merlin, only spoke in half truths, as the King left out the part about the sword being split in half, after he shows a portion from the case. He even tells Guinevere that he has studied the translations of the Carmarthen Scroll, which contain the three elements: the star, the eye, and the sun, but he can't decipher the clues. Arthur's quest to reunite Excalibur has led to his long running obsession to seek out the missing sword piece, which in turn leads to shutting Guinevere out of his life, which in turn leads to her turning to Lancelot, who plans a party for her and makes her feel loved, and would stay behind to watch Guinevere as Arthur began his search for the missing dagger.

With Arthur out on his mission, Lancelot and Guinevere decided to seek out the dagger themselves, by using Merlin's gauntlet that leads the two to a magical passageway that was located in the Vault of the Dark One. However, the passageway was also a deadly trap, as the Dark One emerges as pure darkness, and almost kills Lancelot, but he eventually survives, after Guinevere uses a torch to repel the Darkness. This would lead to a kiss between Lancelot and Guinevere. The two walk through the doorway and discover the Dagger, but couldn't grab it thanks to a protection spell placed on it by Rumplestiltskin, who in exchange for the gauntlet, offered the magical sands of Avalon, which can be used to fix anything that appears to be "broken" at their choosing. Unfortunately, despite Lancelot's warning not to accept it, Guinevere decided to accept the deal and goes back to Arthur. However, when she returns to Camelot, she is confronted by Arthur, who knew about her and Lancelot, and threw the enchanted sand of Avalon on her, making his wife obedient with whatever he wanted, and used more of the sand to create his Camelot empire.

=== In Camelot and the Enchanted Forest ===
King Arthur showed David the broken Excalibur after reading books on how to make it whole, and when he asked David to help him find the other half, David realized where the portion of the dagger came from. As for the dagger itself Emma is being drawn to it with each passing day, but is repelled by a protection spell put in place by Regina. The manifestation of Rumplestiltskin continues to consume Emma's mind to the point of her inadvertently nearly hurting Hook. The effects are starting a toll on Emma, prompting an intervention from Hook, Henry, Mary Margaret, David, and Regina, but before they can come up with a solution, Mary Margaret asks David for a moment alone to talk to her husband, and as expected, was to tell him about King Arthur. However, when she told him about Lancelot being alive and the message he gave her, David ended up defending Arthur, believing that he is being very trustworthy. Mary Margaret on the other hand, believes David has become friends with Arthur because he misses the life he enjoyed back in the Enchanted Forest and that fulfilling it as a Knight in the Round Table will make him important again.

David told Arthur they were going to restore Excalibur right this second and revealed that Emma was the Dark One and that Lancelot was back. David believed that he had brought the dagger to hand over, but Mary Margaret brought it to Lancelot to hide, who then took her to the place that he and Guinevere had discovered. Mary Margaret realized that she has been here before in a vision where Emma pulled her heart out and crushed it, but before they can carry out their plan a deranged Arthur arrived and pulled a sword on them and demanded Mary Margaret hand over the dagger. Arthur reveals that he was planning to use the Dagger to have Emma restore Excalibur, and then, he planned to kill Merlin with Excalibur and become the most powerful king in all the realms. Arthur then uses the dagger to try to command Emma to come to him, only to realize that he was fooled by Mary Margaret, as the dagger she gave him was a fake, and David was on to this plan all along. The threesome took Arthur to Granny's Diner, where Guinevere arrives and uncuffs him. Aware that Guinevere was still under a spell, she broke Lancelot's heart by telling him that she loved Arthur. Arthur also had a plan up his sleeves, as Guinevere blows a kiss out the sands on David and Mary Margaret, then tosses Lancelot in jail, where he was joined by another cellmate, Merida. With Mary Margaret and David now under Arthur's powers, they go to Regina and deceive her, with Mary Margaret saying "Making Excalibur whole is our best chance to help Emma."

Meanwhile, Henry brings Emma & Hook to the stables, but he really just wanted to see Violet, even though he didn't tell her about his birth mother being the Dark One. Hook makes Emma forget all about Rumple's manifestation with a romantic horseback riding. She needed to trust someone, and afterwards the two kiss in a field of Middlemist flowers.

=== In Storybrooke ===
In Storybrooke, Emma still had a pink rose called middlemist from Hook. As for Gold however, he was still locked up saying he is not ready to be a hero. Emma wasn't convinced, telling Gold that she could turn him into one with a little time. It also turned out that Emma has another person working for her as her minion, which is revealed to be Merida, since she has her heart. Emma wants the archer to carry out her plan, telling Merida,"I need you to make him brave."

== Production ==
Both Emilie de Ravin and Rebecca Mader were listed in the opening credits, but were absent in the episode. Abby Ross was featured in flashback footage but was not credited in the episode.

== Reception ==
=== Ratings ===
The episode's numbers remained steady for a third week with a 1.6/5 among 18-49s with 4.92 million viewers tuning in, experiencing another slight drop from the previous episode, while once again winning its timeslot.

=== Reviews ===
The episode received good reviews even though they left some mixed feelings about how it was executed.

Hillary Busis of Entertainment Weekly said, "Even though Merlin’s already appeared in an episode, wouldn’t you love to see him come out of the tree as Titus Welliver. Let’s get some Man in Black up in here."

Amy Ratcliffe of IGN said of the episode, "Though the Camelot arc isn't the most compelling yet, the Storybrooke crew is fitting into it nicely. Arthur's story isn't taking over, and the Excalibur and Dark One's dagger connection means Emma and co. are thoroughly involved. The introduction of the sand from Avalon and seeing Arthur's true nature is opening the door to understanding why Emma embraced evil. They're doing a suitable job of planting those seeds; there's just enough information to start theorizing about Emma's decision." Ratcliffe gave the episode a 6.6 rating out of 10.

In a review from Rickey.org, Nick Roman said, “The Broken Kingdom” is inching the overarching narrative forward for Once Upon A Time, while being fittingly entertaining in its own right. Ultimately, that's all I really ask from an episode."

Gwen Ihnat of The A.V. Club gave the episode a slightly positive review, giving it a C. She notes "I was hoping against hope for Morgan Le Fay to show up, because outside of Guinevere, Camelot is pretty much a dudefest. But Adam Horowitz recently pointed out at a Comic Con that she will not be appearing, that they just didn’t have room for everyone, which is too bad. The knights are fun, but the earthy witches and sorcery of the women of Camelot (Morgan, Morgause, and Vivian) add a deeper dimension to the story. At least in between we get Snow and Charming having another real relationship talk (well, fight, but even that was refreshing), along with a simple example of trickery with a fake dagger that enables them to reveal Arthur’s menace. But it’s not a lot to pin a whole episode on, unless we all start sniffing the pink stuff."

Christine Orlando of TV Fanatic gave the episode a 4.4 out of 5 stars.
