= Dreamcatcher (Once Upon a Time) =

- Once Upon a Time episode
- Episode no.: Season 5 Episode 5
- Directed by: Romeo Tirone
- Written by: Edward Kitsis & Adam Horowitz
- Production code: 505
- Original air date: October 25, 2015

Guest appearances
- Liam Garrigan as King Arthur; Elliot Knight as Merlin; Amy Manson as Merida; Joana Metrass as Queen Guinevere; Ryan Robbins as Sir Morgan; Olivia Steele Falconer as Violet; Guy Fauchon as Nimue

Episode chronology
← Previous "The Broken Kingdom"	Next → "The Bear and the Bow"
- Once Upon a Time season 5

"Dreamcatcher" is the fifth episode of the fifth season of the American fantasy drama series Once Upon a Time, which aired on October 25, 2015.

In this episode, with Mary Margaret and David attempting to retrieve the dagger, Emma uses a Dreamcatcher to look into the past to see how Merlin was transformed into a tree, and joins Regina in their quest to free the sorcerer, but Arthur is determined to keep Merlin imprisoned. Henry is encouraged by both his mothers to ask Violet out on a date. Meanwhile, in Storybrooke, Emma uses Merida to turn Gold into the hero she needs to release Excalibur as the heroes come up with a plan to break into Emma's home to see what she has in the basement.

== Plot ==
=== Opening sequence ===
A pumpkin is featured in the forest.

=== Event chronology ===
The Camelot opening scene takes place after "Nimue". The rest of Camelot events take place after "The Broken Kingdom". The Enchanted Forest scenes at Granny's Diner take place after "The Broken Kingdom". The Storybrooke events take place after "The Broken Kingdom".

=== In the Characters' Past ===
In the early years of Camelot, about 500 years before the Present, Merlin is walking through the forest, calling out The Dark One with the Dagger of Kris. As the original Dark One appears, Merlin tells the gold masked being that he destroyed the only woman he ever loved, so now he will destroy him. However, Merlin fails in his attempt to stab the Dark One, only to drop the knife in shock, saying that he can't do it. The Dark One then picks up the dagger, and holds it to Merlin's neck, with Merlin telling the Dark One that he "misses her." However, the Dark One uses the Dagger to collect a teardrop from Merlin instead, which causes the Dagger to briefly glow purple, and turns him (Merlin) into a tree.

=== In Camelot ===
The events of how Merlin was transformed is witnessed through a dreamcatcher by Emma as she stands near the tree. At the same time, David and Mary Margaret, who are now under King Arthur's command, convince Regina to hand over the dagger to Arthur, unaware that moments after, Regina took the two to the treestump where it was hidden. Emma was waiting for her parents by placing a freezing spell on them. She tells Regina about Arthur using Mary Margaret and David in order to unite Excalibur with the dagger and then kill Merlin, which is why Emma wants a skeptical Regina to work with her to free the sorcerer, even though Regina is not convinced of Emma's claim, believing that Emma's darkness is telling Emma this, which Emma disputes by saying it's true and that dark magic is the answer. Regina asks how Emma knew her parents were under the spell, and she shows Regina the dreamcatcher. Regina tells Emma that the device catches more than dreams because it's dark magic and dangerous, as Emma believes that her dark magic is stronger than she thought.

Emma then explains to Regina about how Merlin was imprisoned in the tree. Regina suggests to Emma that a tear of another lost love would be the answer to releasing Merlin. At the same time this was happening, Henry helps Violet groom her horse. The two talked about having lost a parent, with Violet telling Henry that her mother was once a champion rider before she died. Henry then sees a sword and pretends to pull Excalibur from the stone, but he is no match for the sword, and he falls through the stable wall. All of a sudden Violet's father Sir Morgan arrives, where the introduction becomes an unwelcomed one for Henry. Morgan disapproves of the outsider because of his lack of swordsman and horse riding skills, and even saving Violet from an ogre attack if it comes to that. Morgan tells Henry to stay away from Violet and leave the stables.

Later on in the woods, Regina and Emma stumble onto Henry practicing and both give him a boost of encouragement. This brought back memories for Regina as she reflected about how Cora killed Daniel, which gave Regina an idea to obtain the tear, which could come from her by using the dreamcatcher. When Emma tried using it, the potion didn't work, as Regina has moved on with Robin. Meanwhile, Henry treats Violet to dinner and a movie at Granny's and she is impressed, but when the subject of dating or courting came up, Violet tells Henry that she wants to just be friends, but explains that it was not because of her father's disapproval of him. This devastated Henry because he is not a hero in this universe. He is consoled by Regina, who then takes Henry's teardrop and gives it to Emma and tells Henry he just found a way to save Emma.

As they joined Emma at Merlin's tree, Arthur and his Knights are ready to stop Regina and Emma from releasing Merlin, calling them liars. As Regina unleashed her hand of fire to keep Arthur at bay, she tells Emma to use the spell, which unleashes light and dark magic, freeing Merlin. The now-human sorcerer then calls out Emma, and lashed out at Arthur, telling the King that he - and not Merlin's false prophecies - are to blame for this mess, and added as long as the dagger and Excalibur are separated Merlin is untouchable. Arthur, however says this is far from over. Merlin later lifted Arthur's spell off of David and Mary Margaret. Hook asks Merlin if he can he free Emma to remove darkness out of her. Merlin revealed he could lift the darkness from Emma, but there was just one thing he needs from Emma, and that is if Emma's heart was ready to release the darkness from hers.

=== In Storybrooke ===
In present day, the residents discover that Grif has disappeared, but Arthur, who had his squire killed, kept silent about his "whereabouts." Henry, on the other hand, believes the only way to stay positive in light of all this is to hold a dance, which in turn was a way to ask Violet out. At the same time, Emma continues to make a real man out of Gold without telling him exactly why she needed him. Gold tried to tell Emma that being the Dark One would cost her the ones she loved, but she didn't want to listen. She then brings in Merida to do her bidding and sends them to the woods. Emma, heeding Gold's words, was having second thoughts about everything as she went to her shed full of dreamcatchers and cried. As they arrive in the woods, Merida began putting Gold to work on making him a hero, but he is shown to be weak, which infuriated the Scottish archer from DunBroch. She then finds something that he can fight for by showing him Belle's chipped teacup, then taunts Gold on how cowardly he was, even to Belle. Gold immediately takes the sword and swings at Merida, who stops and tells him that what he did was an act of bravery, he was not thinking about himself or his limp: he was thinking of her. But, she also says that they have a long way to go so they can kill Emma.

Later on that day, Henry met up with Violet to ask her out to the dance, but she tells Henry that her horse Nico was missing, so he went to Emma for help, believing the mother he loved was still inside her. He asked her to help him find Nico. The two later found Nico at the pumpkin patch, where the owner warned Emma to stay away. Unbeknownst to Emma, Henry used the missing horse search to allow Regina, Hook, Robin, and Belle sneak into Emma's home to find out what she kept in the basement. When Regina discovers that Emma placed a protection spell on it, she used Henry's scarf to act as a counter spell, and discover Excalibur and the dagger together on the stone.

When Hook tries to pull it, Regina stops him as it might be booby-trapped. Belle also discovers the rope indicating that Gold was in the room, but when Regina gets a text that Emma was returning, everyone makes their exit. As they do, Hook spots a box and a dreamcatcher on the table. Regina believes that is where Emma stored everyone's memories. They later catch up with Arthur to tell about the dagger and Excalibur in Emma's possession, Arthur tells them that if Emma merges the two together it could either snuff out light or dark magic, leading Mary Margaret to believe that Emma might be trying to eliminate the light magic.

Finally, Henry arrives with Nico and brings it to Violet, with Sir Morgan thanking Henry for being a noble and heroic person. Unfortunately, Regina and Robin decided to look into the dreamcatcher, and discover what they see is Violet's memories: It turns out Violet discovered a note from Henry for their date, but Emma materialized and made Violet keep a secret by taking her heart as part of her plan to free Merlin by convincing her to break Henry's heart, which leads to his tear being used. Henry sees this and is devastated by Emma's betrayal, and he is not alone; When Emma learns of what happened, Regina explained how she can betray Henry like that by choosing darkness over her son. Regina then points out how Emma is no different from Cora for what she did to Daniel and warns Emma to stay away from Henry, who has also turned on Emma by closing the blinds on her before she disappears into the darkness.

== Production ==
Rebecca Mader was listed in the credits but was not featured in this episode, while Barbara Hershey and Noah Bean were featured in flashback footage but not credited in the episode.

== Reception ==
=== Ratings ===
The episode's numbers remained steady for a fourth week with a 1.6/5 among 18-49s, but saw a slight increase with 5.12 million viewers tuning in.

=== Reviews ===
The episode received positive reviews, especially for the character dynamics of the episode, along with praise for the acting, and surprising plotline.

Andrea Towers of Entertainment Weekly notes in her assessment of the review, "I’ve said this over and over, but one of my favorite things this season are the Camelot outfits. I also love how Regina is dressed routinely in red while Emma is dressed in white: similar to how their wardrobe choices reflected their intentions back in the first season."

Amy Ratcliffe of IGN said of the episode, "The dialogue in tonight's episode was flat and sometimes ridiculous but not necessarily because of the subject at hand. Some silliness is expected from a series about fairy tales, but that wasn't the issue. The delivery and flow all felt a little off. We can see how Emma is slowly succumbing to becoming the Dark One and it's great to see Merlin is already free, but the scenes between Henry and Violet were a distraction and a spell being cured with love is something we've seen before." Ratcliffe gave the episode a 6.5 rating out of 10.

In a review from Rickey.org, Nick Roman said, "Once Upon a Time thrived for four seasons on the notion that Emma Swan (Jennifer Morrison) was the be all, end all hero of the storybook worlds, and ours. Season 5, however, is an exploration into what happens when the best of heroes turn evil, even if the intentions behind the turn were good. To this end, “Dreamcatcher” is a compelling depiction of the corruption of a hero. After all, the road to Hell is paved with good intentions."

Gwen Ihnat of The A.V. Club gave the episode positive review, giving it a B−. While she liked the episode, she left some reservations: "Ultimately, depending on what you want from your Once, “Dreamcatcher” was a bit of a let down. It moved the plot along, but at a feverish pace and with built in leaps in faith and storyline that just haven't been explained enough. (How, for instance, did Emma learn that she could capture memories in dreamcatchers? [Emma learns from Mr. Gold how to use a Dreamcatcher in Season 2, using Pongo's memories to see what happened between Archie & Regina.] And why is that the craft she chose now that she doesn't need to sleep? [It's a reference to Neal, who was mentioned throughout the episode.]) Maybe all those assumptions and conclusions will be eventually explained in one of those “ohhhhh, I get it now” summations a couple of episodes down the road, but maybe not. Once's writers and creators have a tendency to play fast and loose with their storylines, knowing their audience will just kind of accept it and move on. Thus, these kinds of leaps aren't really out of the question for them. (You can't blame them, really. We’re already watching a show about fairy tales, for crying out loud.) But I didn't really get “Dreamcatcher.” I'm not sure that I'm supposed to yet, and down the road I might change my mind and say, “you know, that was the episode I need to go back and watch now that I know what I know.” But for now, it just left me a little cold. "
