= Last Rites (Once Upon a Time) =

- Once Upon a Time episode
- Episode no.: Season 5 Episode 21
- Directed by: Craig Powell
- Written by: Jerome Schwartz
- Production code: 521
- Original air date: May 8, 2016

Guest appearances
- Lee Arenberg as Grumpy / Leroy; Emma Caulfield as the Blind Witch; Beverly Elliot as Widow Lucas / Granny; Liam Garrigan as King Arthur; Greg Germann as Hades; Amy Manson as Merida; Victoria Smurfit as Cruella De Vil / Cruella Feinberg; David Hoflin as Zeus; Eric Keenleyside as Moe French

Episode chronology
← Previous "Firebird"	Next → "Only You"
- Once Upon a Time season 5

"Last Rites" is the twenty-first episode of the fifth season of the American fantasy drama series Once Upon a Time, which aired on May 8, 2016.

In this episode, Zelena redeems after finding out that Hades tricked her. Meanwhile, in the Underworld, King Arthur shows up and helps Hook find out about Hades' weakness. In the end, Hook comes back to life.

== Plot ==
=== Opening sequence ===
The Storybrooke Town Hall appears in the forest.

=== Event chronology ===
The Underworld events take place after "Firebird" and 50 years before the DVD special "Tales from the Underworld: A Knight with Cruella". The Storybrooke events take place after "Our Decay".

=== In Storybrooke ===
In the hours after Hades and Zelena return to Storybrooke, Zelena goes off to find the others and leaves the baby with Hades. While she is gone, King Arthur, who just escaped from jail and is being tracked down by Mary Margaret, Merida and the dwarves, stumbles upon Hades, but he kills Arthur as he sees him as a threat. Zelena finds Regina and Robin Hood and tries to convince them that Hades has changed his ways. Emma, David and Henry are reunited with Snow and Merida and explain the details of Hades' deception but Emma's vengeance against Hades is making her too emotional. Zelena and Hades are talking about the others not believing that he changed. Hades gets a weapon, known as the Olympian Crystal (Zeus's thunderbolt), which can kill anybody, even a god. Zelena also suggests that they should leave but Hades say no, stating that they will find them no matter what. As Emma, Merida and David find Arthur's body, David tries to calm down a furious Emma.

Meanwhile, Gold goes to Belle's father Moe to see if he can give Belle true love's kiss to wake up Belle from the sleeping curse she put herself under, but Moe refuses. Emma then shows up asking Gold for help defeating Hades, but Gold declines to help. Gold later calls Hades to offer him a deal by protecting him in exchange for the Crystal, only to have Hades turn down the offer.

Back at Regina's office, Hades is able to put back together the Crystal with Zelena's help. Zelena then sees Emma trying to break the protection spell that Zelena put on the town hall knowing that Emma wants to kill Hades (after she saw the new pages appear in front of her), leading to a confrontation between the women. Back inside the town hall, after they entered through a tunnel, Regina and Robin use Zelena's distraction to take the baby, only to be caught by Hades, who wants to use the crystal to destroy Regina. He explains that the crystal will not allow the person to move on to the Underworld but rather simply destroy their very presence. Robin sacrifices himself as he saves Regina from being destroyed by Hades. Zelena comes in and picks up the crystal as Hades tries to tempt Zelena to kill Regina, only to have Zelena realize that Hades never changed. She then kills Hades with the crystal. Later, Emma, Henry, Mary Margaret, David, Regina, Zelena and others attend Robin's funeral, as Zelena tells Regina that she has named her daughter Robin, in honor of her father. Emma decides to stay for a couple more minutes, and notices a resurrected Hook, who was brought back by Zeus as a reward for helping to defeat Hades, and the two are happily reunited. Meanwhile, Mr. Gold enters Regina's office, and it is revealed that a piece of the Crystal remains, which Mr. Gold collects for a new plan.

=== In the Underworld ===
King Arthur comes inside the Underbrooke diner, confused and not knowing that he is dead, until he is reunited with Hook who after a denial and angry conversation tells him he is in the Underworld now, he asks for Arthur's help in stopping Hades. King Arthur agrees to help him after being told he can either be sent to a better place or worse place or be trapped here forever. Later, Hook and King Arthur searched Hades' lair where they look for Hades' story, when Arthur realizes that the only way that Hades keeps his secrets would be inside his throne just like Arthur would do and find the missing pages. Shortly after that, Hook and King Arthur learn from Cruella that the "Once Upon a Time" book is near the River of Lost Souls, and when Hook and King Arthur find it there the lost Souls attempt to take it and Arthur but thanks to Hook he saves both Arthur and the book, where they discover the only way to destroy Hades is by using the Olympian Crystal, and Hook uses the book to magically reach the living successfully (after Emma sees it). Later, King Arthur decides to stay in the Underworld to repair it, telling Hook that he was prophesied to repair a broken kingdom, thinking it was Camelot when it was really the Underworld. Hook steps into the light of Mount Olympus and he meets Zeus, who then shows Hook the way back to the land of the living.

== Production ==
Emilie de Ravin is listed as credited but does not appear as she was on maternity leave during the filming of the episode.

== Reception ==
This episode was met with highly negative reviews. Generally considered an anticlimactic ending to the Underworld arc with Robin's fate being the main source of criticism. Andrea Towers of Entertainment Weekly gave it a good review: "Once Upon a Time promised death...and as Hades came to Storybrooke, death was delivered. (As was Regina’s unhappiness, yet again. This girl cannot catch a break.)"

In a review from Rickey.org, Nick Roman said, ""Last Rites" indulges in the grand Once Upon a Time tradition of presenting good outcomes and terrible outcomes in equal measure."

Amy Ratcliffe of IGN said of the episode, "Hook being brought back wasn't the biggest of shocks, but it was surprising to lose Robin. Unfortunately, I'm already so concerned about the inevitable struggle between good and evil that it will bring for Regina (another plot point we're apparently going to revisit) I couldn't focus on the weight of the loss." Ratcliffe gave the episode a 5.5 rating out of 10, calling it "Mediocre."

Gwen Ihnat of The A.V. Club gave the episode a good review, giving it a B− overall. In her recap however, she was upset over how they didn't give series regular Sean Maguire more stories for his character in general: "I’m glad for Sean Maguire that his character bit the dust this episode. When Robin Hood, one of the great, rakish heroes of all time, someone who should be swooping up women right alongside Captain Hook, is reduced to being a glorified blanket carrier for episodes, it’s like being on Once Upon a Time had him trapped in his own personal Underworld. When’s the last time Robin had his own plot—better yet, a plot that didn’t involve just traipsing along after Regina... That’s a plot for a hapless type like Walter Mitty, not Robin Hood."

Christine Orlando of TV Fanatic gave the episode a 4.6 out of 5.
