= Broken Heart (Once Upon a Time) =

- Once Upon a Time episode
- Episode no.: Season 5 Episode 10
- Directed by: Romeo Tirone
- Written by: Dana Horgan; Tze Chun
- Production code: 510
- Original air date: November 29, 2015

Guest appearances
- Beverley Elliott as Granny / Widow Lucas; Caroline Ford as Nimue; Liam Garrigan as King Arthur; Amy Manson as Merida; Joana Metrass as Queen Guinevere; Sinqua Walls as Lancelot

Episode chronology
← Previous "The Bear King"	Next → "Swan Song"
- Once Upon a Time season 5

"Broken Heart" is the tenth episode of the fifth season of the American fantasy drama series Once Upon a Time, which aired on November 29, 2015.

In this episode, Hook challenges Mr. Gold to a sword fight on the Jolly Roger, while Emma Swan and Henry get the memories of the past six weeks back. In Camelot, Hook casts the Dark Curse.

== Plot ==
=== Opening sequence ===
The Jolly Roger is featured in the forest.

=== Event chronology ===
The Camelot flashbacks take place after "The Bear King". The Enchanted Forest flashbacks and the Storybrooke events take place after "Birth".

=== In the Enchanted Forest and Camelot ===
In the Vault of the Dark One, the Darkness enters Hook, making him remember all of the darkest moments of his life, including the time when Rumplestiltskin killed Milah and took his hand, when Rumplestiltskin took his heart as part of a (failed) plan to absorb Emma into Merlin's hat, and when Emma became the Dark One. This causes him to scream in agony, before he emerges outside of the Vault from dark energy, as the newest Dark One. Like Emma, he is greeted by a manifestation of Rumplestiltskin, who offers Hook a chance to seek revenge on the living Rumplestiltskin, but Hook is reluctant to take up the challenge, knowing what the manifestation is, and not wanting to give in to the darkness.

David, Mary Margaret, Merlin, and the others search for Hook near the Vault of the Dark One, but they are too late, as Hook is no longer there. David expresses his frustration at being thwarted when they were so close to wiping out the Darkness, but Mary Margaret reminds him that they would have chosen to save their loved ones in any situation, which Emma did. Merlin tells them that this was the darkest possible future he saw for Emma, and that now, their fight to destroy the Darkness had become much more difficult. Merlin sends Lancelot to find his mother, the Lady of the Lake, as she can help them defeat the Darkness. Merlin heads back to the diner, while the others continue their search for Emma and Hook around the restaurant.

When Hook says that the manifestation is lying, that there's no way to go back to Storybrooke, the manifestation taunts him by saying that he could use the Dark Curse to return. When Hook says that he would never use Emma's heart to enact the Curse, the manifestation says that for Dark Ones, "there is always a loophole." Suddenly, Emma appears as the other Dark One, to convince Hook that they can work together to stop the Darkness by bonding together in love, and their kiss causes the manifestation of Rumplestiltskin to disappear. Later that night, Hook feels the "pull" of Excalibur towards the Dagger of the Dark One, despite Emma's claim that Excalibur had disappeared. When he calls Emma back, she admits that she has Excalibur, because Hook told her that he couldn't resist the darkness, making Hook furious with her lack of trust in him. Hook tells her that he had always trusted her, and that he was the one who told Emma's parents that she had to decide on her own not to crush Merida's heart in the past, before disappearing. Later on, Emma is forced to summon him with the Excalibur fragment later, just to have a conversation, angering him even more by the fact that she had used Excalibur to "force" him to come. She gives him Excalibur so that he can be in control of himself and they share a kiss.

Emma and Hook arrive at Granny's Diner together, with both of them telling a concerned David and Mary Margaret that they were fine, despite Emma's change in appearance, and with Hook adding that he "didn't look like a Crocodile just yet." The others tell them that they can finally continue their quest to destroy the Darkness, with Hook volunteering to get Merlin from the Diner. As Merlin was finishing the message that would be later be received in Storybrooke, Hook appears and locks the doors, revealing that he planned to cast another Dark Curse in order to get his revenge on Gold. Merlin says that this is impossible, since he would have to crush the heart of "the thing they love most" to enact it, and Hook would never kill Emma. Hook then takes Merlin's heart, and the manifestation of Rumplestiltskin morphs into one of Nimue, who appears to see Hook crush the heart. Just then, Emma enters, devastated to find out that Hook has tricked her. Hook says that he had always planned to get his revenge on Gold, and adds that no one will ever control him again, before sending Excalibur back into the Stone to ensure this. When Emma asks Nimue why she was helping Hook, Nimue reveals that Hook had made a deal with her: the Darkness would ensure Hook vengeance on Gold while Hook in turn would help the Darkness snuff out the Light, which devastates Emma. Nimue goes on to explain that when Hook crushes Merlin's heart, it also counts as her crushing his heart, since she is "in all the Dark Ones," which will allow Hook's Curse to work. Emma tries desperately to convince Hook to stop, telling him that he doesn't need revenge, and that his happy ending was with her. She warns Hook that if he crushes Merlin's heart, he will destroy his happy ending. However, Hook states that it was her "lovesick puppy dog" "Killian Jones" who had fallen in love with her, claiming that his former self was killed when she "turned him into a Dark One." Then, he suddenly crushes Merlin's heart in his hand, to enact the Curse. When Merlin dies, Emma tells Merlin that she was sorry, before dissolving his body and telling him to rest in peace. Unable to stop the Curse, a heartbroken Emma knocks Hook out, before using a dreamcatcher to erase Hook's memories, to prevent him from remembering why he cast the Curse. Then, at the behest of the manifestation of Rumplestiltskin, Emma brings her parents, Henry, Regina, Robin, Belle, their friends and Zelena (whom she reinstalled the magic-inhibiting cuff on) back to Granny's Diner in an unconscious state, before using the dreamcatcher to erase all of their memories, and to add a forgetting spell to the Curse, to keep Hook from ever finding out that he was a Dark One. Meanwhile, in Camelot, Arthur is shocked to find Excalibur's fragment returned to the Stone, and Guinevere points out the cloud of the Curse, which Arthur describes as "extremely dark magic." Then, Merida (who was riding her way back to Camelot to fight Arthur), Arthur, and Guinevere look on as the purple cloud of the Dark Curse engulfs Camelot and part of the Enchanted Forest.

=== In Storybrooke ===
At Emma's home, Hook, now endowed with the Dark One's powers, starts to embrace his new life in darkness, as Zelena watches in delight in front of an immobile Emma. Upset over what she did to him, Hook takes the dreamcatcher to erase Emma's memories of the events in Camelot, while Zelena places the anti-magic cuffs on her. Mary Margaret, David, Henry and Regina arrive to find Emma unconscious on a couch, and powerless. When she awakens, she tells them about Hook's becoming a Dark One. They berate her for her actions and hypocrisy which involved murder, but they reason that they can simply use the dreamcatchers to regain their memories and find out what Hook's plans are. However, Hook had taken all of the dreamcatchers. At the pawn shop, Hook shows up to challenge Gold to a battle on the Jolly Roger, so that he can finally get his revenge, giving Gold a cutlass to use for the battle, while Hook wields Excalibur. As Gold and Belle alert the others about Hook's challenge, they debate about whether they should leave the cuffs on Emma, and with Henry's distrust of Emma after everything she had done, they agree to leave her at the house with the cuffs, as they devise a plan to stop Hook.

Zelena heads to the hospital to find her child but finds only Regina, telling her that the child is Robin's and that their feud has to end. However, she allows Zelena to meet with Robin and the baby back at David and Mary Margaret's loft; she tells Zelena that she hopes that her love for her child will change her, the same way it did for her because of her love for Henry. Vowing that they will never be a family, Robin tells Zelena he will allow her to visit the child, as long either he or Regina are present. Zelena then has her first real bonding moment with her new baby.

Regina asks Merida to keep an eye on Emma, who wishes to pay her back after what she did to her, only to have Hook appear in front of the archer and knock her out. When Emma asks Hook what he plans on doing, he replies by saying that since he was now the Dark One, he was a "free man" and now sought revenge on Mr. Gold. He says that he is no longer bound by love or by Emma as "a distraction" from his true goal. He tells her that each time Emma is in trouble, she pushes away all of her loved ones, including Hook, because she thinks that she can solve all of her problems on her own, and that this trait will keep her as an "orphan" forever. He goes on to tell her that she didn't need any villains to destroy her happiness, because she was already good at doing that to herself. When Emma asks Hook why he's telling her that, Hook says that he's doing it because he wants to hurt her like how she hurt him, before vanishing. However, Hook's appearance had given Emma enough time to escape, to warn Gold and ask him to succeed in distracting Hook during their upcoming duel, so that she can retrieve the dreamcatchers.

Emma then teams up with Henry to form "Operation Cobra: Part II." Henry offers to create a locator spell, using a magic potion from Gold's pawn shop. On board the Jolly Roger, Hook and Gold begin their battle, with Hook using magic to repair Gold's crippled leg to give him "a fair fight." Despite Gold's efforts, Hook backs Gold into a corner and draws blood with his hook, saying that he will enjoy the final blow. This gives Henry and Emma enough time to find the dreamcatchers, which happen to be located inside the clock tower, only for them to discover that they are protected by a spell. Henry decides to trust Emma again, and uses a magic potion to remove her cuffs, which allows her to remove the dreamcatchers from Hook's protection spell. Back on the ship, Gold is able to take control of the fight, when the manifestation of Rumplestiltskin distracts Hook by telling him to kill the actual Mr. Gold, who seizes the opportunity to drop a weight on Hook and seize Excalibur. When Hook recovers from the impact, Gold decides to let Hook live forever, with the memory of being beaten by Gold. Hook says that his victory was only temporary, and disappears. When Gold meets Belle at the well, she informs Gold she wants to "step back" in their relationship. She tells him that she spent too many years trying to mend Gold's heart and now, she wants to protect her own heart, leaving a heartbroken Rumplestiltskin at the well. As Emma and Henry distribute the dreamcatchers to everyone and restores their memories, Emma has a realization as she learns that Hook intentionally lost the duel to Gold, so that he could get a drop of Gold's blood. It turns out that Hook planned to use the blood at the pond, for a spell that opens a portal into the Underworld. Hook opens the portal and summons all of the previous Dark Ones (minus Rumplestiltskin), led by Nimue, to aid him in destroying light magic.

== Production ==
Rachel Shelley, who appeared as Milah in the episode "The Crocodile", is shown in a flashback scene.

== Reception ==
The episode received generally positive reviews from critics.

In a review from Rickey.org, Nick Roman said, "All in all, while “Broken Heart” had its shortcomings, I thought it was a fun episode for Once Upon a Time. Everyone has their memories back, and we’re right at the point the season started. So, presumably, we won't be getting any more flashbacks. Rather, the story will move forward, hopefully, and show us just how the Darkness and the Light will clash. Knowing Once Upon a Time, there will probably be some sort of compromise, but I think it'd be bold if the show snuffed out one or the other, just to show us what a world without Light, or a world without plot-driving evil, looks like."

Andrea Towers of Entertainment Weekly notes in her assessment of the review: "We’ve got one more week until the winter finale of Once Upon a Time, and we’re finally getting some answers to what happened in Camelot all those weeks ago. Namely: We have memories! Finally! Which is good because those memories are definitely going to come in handy with what currently is threatening Storybrooke..."

Amy Ratcliffe of IGN said of the episode, "This week's Once won the day in the small moments. Years of fleshing out characters and their relationships paid off in scenes like the one with Henry and Emma reconciling and Regina bringing Zelena over for a visit with her daughter. We got to see Belle stand up for herself, and we saw the biggest threat of them all introduced. But as far as Emma and Hook are concerned, the story fell short. Hook's fall was too rushed and sort of undermined Emma's turn to the dark side." Ratcliffe gave the episode a 7.7 rating out of 10.

Christine Orlando of TV Fanatic gave the episode a 4.5 out of 5.
