= Devil's Due (Once Upon a Time) =

- Once Upon a Time episode
- Episode no.: Season 5 Episode 14
- Directed by: Alrick Riley
- Written by: Jane Espenson
- Production code: 514
- Original air date: March 20, 2016

Guest appearances
- Lee Arenberg as Leroy/Grumpy/Dreamy; Aaron Douglas as Fendrake the Healer; Beverley Elliott as Widow Lucas/Granny; Greg Germann as Hades; Robbie A. Kay as Malcolm/Peter Pan/Pied Piper; Rachel Shelley as Milah; Victoria Smurfit as Cruella De Vil/Cruella Feinberg

Episode chronology
← Previous "Labor of Love"	Next → "The Brothers Jones"
- Once Upon a Time season 5

"Devil's Due" is the fourteenth episode of the fifth season of the American fantasy drama series Once Upon a Time, which aired on March 20, 2016.

In this episode, Emma, Mr. Gold, and Milah find a way into Hades' lair; and Regina tries to find out whether Daniel is in the Underworld. In flashbacks, Rumpelstiltskin makes a deal with a healer.

== Plot ==
=== Opening sequence ===
Hook is shown hanging from a chain in the red-tinted Enchanted Forest.

=== Event chronology ===
The Enchanted Forest events from take place after "Manhattan" and "Good Form", and before "The Crocodile" (the final scene with Rumplestiltskin and Fendrake takes place during the events of "The Miller's Daughter", after Rumplestiltskin began his relationship with Cora). The Storybrooke events take place after "Swan Song" and before "Our Decay". The Underworld events take place after "Labor of Love".

=== In the Characters' Past ===
In the Enchanted Forest, Rumple and Milah argue over his cowardice, but then lose sight of Baelfire, who is poisoned by an Atlantean Rat Snake. Milah coerces with Rumple to kill a healer, Fendrake, and steal the antidote from him. However, Rumple cannot bring himself to kill the healer, but instead bargains with him for the antidote. Rumple agrees to hand over his second-born child to Fendrake in return for Baelfire's cure. While this is going on, Milah encounters Hook for the first time at a tavern. Milah and Rumple meet and cure Baelfire, but Milah is furious at her husband upon learning of the deal he made. Years later, after Rumple has become the Dark One, he visits and kills Fendrake in order to void the contract.

=== In the Underworld ===
Hades has grown impatient with Hook over the latter's refusal to pick three living people to stay behind, so Hades condemns him to the River of Lost Souls (Acheron). Hook is then chained up and hung by Hades. Meanwhile, Gold receives a message and a flute from Pan at the pawn shop before conjuring up a crystal ball. However, a shocked Rumple drops and shatters the ball after seeing an image of Belle, who was at Granny's Diner with Leroy. After meeting with Emma, he tells her that they'll need a deceased soul's aura to disguise their presence in order to save Hook. He introduces Emma to his late wife, Milah. The group then heads to Emma's Underworld home and Milah is able to penetrate a protection spell leading to Hades' lair. The trio go further, but Milah and Rumple both stay behind to watch over the boat. Emma sees Hook and rescues him from being dropped into the green river.

Meanwhile, at Granny's Diner, Regina gets help from Cruella, who explains how to tell if someone has moved on from the Underworld. Snow and Regina visit the cemetery and find Daniel's tombstone toppled, which shows that he has moved forward. Later Regina rediscovers her magical abilities after healing an injured horse.

While waiting at the boat, Gold and Milah try to make amends. However, the moment is interrupted by Hades who freezes Milah and suggests making a deal with Gold. Hades suggests that Gold gets rid of his company in exchange for ensuring that Rumple safely returns to Storybrooke. Milah unfreezes and attempts to tell Emma of Gold's planned deception, but he blasts her into the River of Lost Souls. Emma soon after arrives with Hook. Gold lies, saying that Hades attacked and pushed Milah in the river. Emma prepares to split her heart in half and share it with Hook in order to return him to the living. However, Regina is unable to take Emma's heart. It turns out that Hades personally picked Regina, Snow, and Emma as the three living souls unable to leave the Underworld.

Gold pays a visit to Hades, who has broken his promise to let Rumple return to Storybrooke. Hades explains that he found out about the crystal ball, which revealed a pregnant Belle when Gold asked to see his child (the intent being to see Baelfire). Since Rumple signed over his second-born child to Fendrake who is now dead, Hades is now the recipient of that deal. Hades tells Gold that he needs to work for him, threatening to take his unborn child.

== Production ==
Rebecca Mader does not appear in this episode.

== Cultural references ==
The five rivers of Hades in the Underworld are featured in this episode:

- Acheron is a green river of sorrowful lost souls.
- Lethe is a yellow river meaning oblivion, forgetfulness, or concealment.
- Phlegethon is a river of fire.
- Cocytus is a steaming river of wailing or lamentation.
- Styx is a blue river of hate that forms the boundary between Earth & the Underworld.

== Reception ==
The episode was met with positive reviews.

In a review from Rickey.org, Nick Roman said, "Once Upon a Time frequently asks viewers to sympathize with villains, predicated on the notion that every villain has some good in there somewhere. “Devil’s Due” keeps with this tried and true formula, by showing us a dyed-in-the-wool villain who finds himself completely screwed over by a desperate act of love from his past. It results in an episode that is unmistakably compelling, even though we’ve been down the same road with this character about a thousand times now."

Andrea Towers of Entertainment Weekly gave the episode a positive review.

Gwen Ihnat of The A.V. Club gave the episode an excellent review, giving it a B+. In her recap, she points out: "Need any more proof that Rumplestiltskin is Once Upon A Time’s best character? The episodes focused on him just seem to fly by. A lot of this is due to Robert Carlyle’s baddassery, able to bring vulnerability to Rumple the coward, and ruthlessness to the Dark One, all in the same episode."

Christine Orlando of TV Fanatic gave the episode a 4.9 out of 5.
