= Merida (Brave) =

Fictional main character from the 2012 film Brave

- Brave character
- First appearance: Brave (2012)
- Created by: Brenda Chapman
- Voiced by: Kelly Macdonald Julie Fowlis (off-screen singing voice) Peigi Barker (child) (Brave, Brave (video game)); Ruth Connell (Disney Infinity 3.0, Sofia the First, Lego The Incredibles, LEGO Pixar: Bricktoons, Disney Dreamlight Valley); Elsie Lovelock (Disney Speedstorm)
- Portrayed by: Amy Manson (Once Upon a Time)

In-universe information
- Title: Princess of DunBroch
- Affiliation: Disney Princesses
- Family: King Fergus (father); Queen Elinor (mother); Princes Harris, Hubert and Hamish (younger brothers)
- Nationality: Scottish

Merida, Princess of DunBroch is the main protagonist of the 2012 Disney/Pixar film Brave (2012). Voiced by Scottish actress Kelly Macdonald, Merida was added to the Disney Princess line-up as the eleventh member, on May 11, 2013, becoming the first, and to date only, Disney Princess from a Pixar production.

== Development ==
The brainchild of original director Brenda Chapman, Merida is Pixar's first female lead.

=== Origins and concept ===
Princess Merida is the 16-year-old daughter of King Fergus and Queen Elinor, who rule a kingdom in Scotland. Queen Elinor's traditional expectations that Merida takes a husband and become a proper royal lady come into conflict with the single-minded and impetuous Merida's insistence that she controls her own destiny. Merida has greatly perfected her skill in archery and is one of the most skilled archers in the kingdom. She is also incredibly skilled in spears, sword-fighting and racing across the countryside on Angus, her Clydesdale horse. Despite her outgoing, forceful personality, Merida does have a softness of heart, particularly when it comes to her younger triplet brothers, Harris, Hubert and Hamish. She is pampered but in no way spoiled, and even though she frequently argues with her mother, Merida does love her parents.

=== Voice ===
Merida is voiced by actress Kelly Macdonald. Macdonald was hired to replace Reese Witherspoon, the actress originally cast in the role. Two of the songs in the movie, "Touch the Sky" and "Into The Open Air", were sung by Julie Fowlis, as Merida's off-screen musical thoughts. In Disney Speedstorm, she is voiced by Elsie Lovelock.

=== Design and characterization ===
Merida has long, wild, curly, red hair, blue eyes, pale skin and a slender body. Her main outfit is a dark cyan-emerald green traditional gown, made of wool, with stylish slits for movement during archery. When the Lords arrive for the games, she is dressed in a Medieval-style turquoise silk gown with long arms, gold trimmings, and gold beading, teamed with a white wimple and crown to hold in her hair. She also appears in scenes wearing a navy/black cape with a gold buckle. Merida's bow is slung onto her back, over her shoulder, with arrows in a brown leather quiver around her waist. In the final scene, Merida is seen wearing a dark blue gown with light green patterns.

== Appearances ==
=== Video games ===
Merida appeared as the main character in the endless runner video game Temple Run: Brave, a spinoff of the game Temple Run. The game was released on June 14, 2012, a week before the film was released. Merida and her father King Fergus are the playable characters in the game. The developers, Keith Shepherd and Natalia Luckyanova noted, "We definitely had some surreal moments while working with them. They're Pixar! They do such a fantastic job of appealing to young audiences as well as adults. Their movies always span the whole range of emotions, from happiness to sadness, to everything in-between. Working with them, I think there was a couple of times where we just had to pinch ourselves and, you know, ask is this really happening?" The game received positive reviews from critics.

MacDonald reprised the role as Merida for the video game adaptation of the film. Merida is a playable character in Disney Infinity 2.0, Lego The Incredibles, Disney Magic Kingdoms, and Disney Mirrorverse and appears as a villager in Disney Dreamlight Valley.

=== Bravely ===
Merida appears in young adult novel Bravely written by author Maggie Stiefvater, published by Disney Press on 3 May 2022. The story picks up a year after events of Brave where DunBroch is about to be demolished by god of destruction, Feradach (whom Merida later romances), while the ancient entity of creation known as Cailleach informs Merida about a way to save her people.

== Other appearances ==
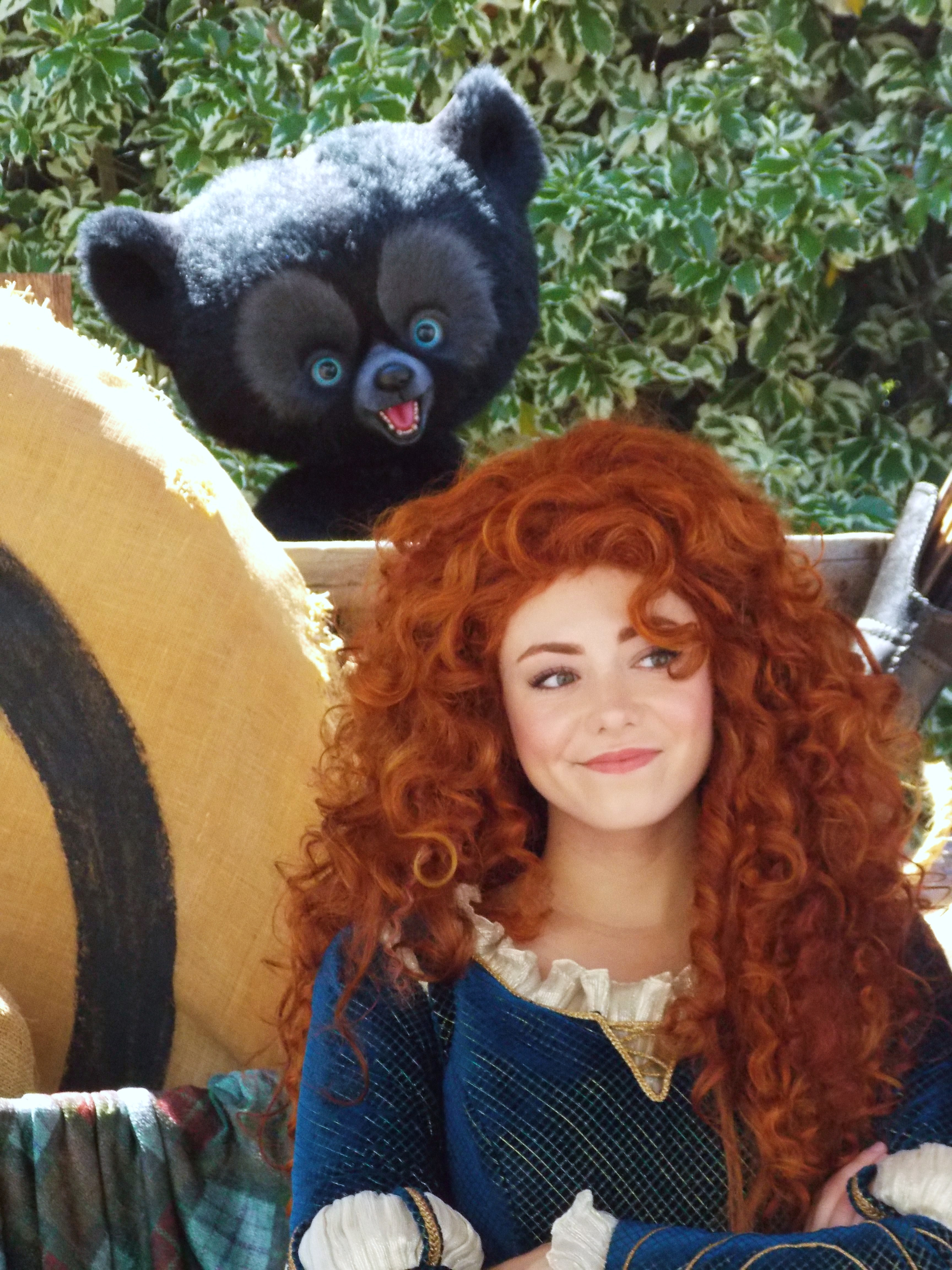
Merida at Disneyland

Merida is a character to meet and greet at the various Disney parks and can usually be found in Fantasyland. At Disneyland Park, she meets guests near the It's a Small World attraction near a gate used as a parade terminus. She is also seen sometimes at the World Showcase in Epcot.

In 2016, Merida began meet-and-greet sessions at Hong Kong Disneyland, as part of the park's 10th anniversary celebration.

=== Once Upon a Time ===
On July 11, 2015, the producers of Once Upon a Time announced that Merida would be a recurring character in the series' fifth season. Scottish actress Amy Manson was cast as Merida, with her storyline in the series set ten years after the events of Brave, although it is not considered canon to the original film's continuity.

In the sixth episode of the season, "The Bear and the Bow", Merida rescues her brothers with the help of Belle. In the ninth episode, "The Bear King", Merida is revealed to have been tutored in the finer points of combat by Mulan and later teamed up with Mulan and Ruby against King Arthur and the Wicked Witch of the West Zelena on the eve of her coronation as DunBroch's queen, with Fergus having been killed by Arthur a few years earlier.

=== Sofia the First ===
Merida appears in the third-season Sofia the First episode "The Secret Library", where she's called to aid Sofia via the amulet of Avalor, with Ruth Connell assuming the role.

=== Ralph Breaks the Internet ===
Merida appears in Ralph Breaks the Internet (2018) alongside other Disney princesses, with Kelly Macdonald reprising her role. She speaks in the Scots language, and the other princesses cannot understand her because "she's from the other studio".

== Reception and impact ==
The character of Merida has been well received by critics, as well as Macdonald's performance. The decision of Pixar to introduce a lead female heroine was praised by The Guardian. Empire described Merida as "feisty" and as "a modern girl in an ancient world." Merida was included on CNN's list of "Top Female Animated Heroines". She has been described as "a fairy-tale feminist", and has been praised for not needing to be rescued by a male love interest. She has been noted and applauded by feminists and critics for not needing a love interest. She also is one of the few Disney Princesses to not sing in her movie, compared to the other princesses. Entertainment Weekly called Merida, "A spunky Scottish princess with wild red hair, and clearly a lass built to entertain the audience for Twilight and The Hunger Games." Critics have also noted Merida's hair and how it is symbolic of her wild and independent spirit. Entertainment Weekly also referred to Merida as a "headstrong heroine".

Ophelia's Place, a charity dedicated to helping young girls, celebrated Merida for being a body image role model. The organization noted that, "Merida exemplifies strength in women because she is brave and independent. She isn't the typical Disney princess or damsel-in-distress as portrayed by many female characters throughout children's films." Time, however, criticized the movie and Merida for not fully embracing the concept of female empowerment. Author of the piece, Mary Pols also harshly criticized Pixar for firing Chapman, their first female director, halfway through production and for making Merida a traditional princess.

=== Redesign controversy ===
Merida as she appeared when it was announced she would be joining the Disney Princess line-up

In May 2013, Disney released a traditional animation-style redesign of Merida in preparation for her coronation as Disney's 11th princess. The redesign of the character featured a slimmer waist, more revealing neckline, larger eyes and a sparkly dress. Feminist groups criticized the makeover for allegedly disempowering Merida, sparking outrage from mothers and feminist groups who saw the new Merida as "an overly sexualized pin-up version of her former self." Critics were also very critical of the makeover, saying it turned Merida into "just another princess". Creator and co-director Brenda Chapman fiercely criticized the change, calling it 'atrocious' and added that "Merida was created to break that mould." A Change.org petition was created to protest the Merida redesign, with female empowerment website A Mighty Girl arguing that "by making her skinnier, sexier and more mature in appearance, you are sending a message to girls that the original... version of Merida is inferior; that for girls and women to have value... they must conform to a narrow definition of beauty." The petition received over 20,000 signatures in seven days.

Shortly after the petition appeared, Disney removed the redesigned image from their official website, in favor of Merida's original film appearance. Disney later clarified the situation, assuring that Merida would remain in her original form. Disney also released the statement, "The artwork used on Merida's official social media sites has always been the imagery from the movie – there have been no changes. We routinely use different art styles with our characters and this rendition of Merida in her party dress was a special one-time effort to commemorate her coronation. Merida exemplifies what it means to be a Disney Princess through being brave, passionate and confident and she remains the same strong and determined Merida from the movie whose inner qualities have inspired moms and daughters around the world."

Disney later released 2D artworks of Merida that have a closer resemblance to her original form.
