= Child in Time (disambiguation) =

"Child in Time" is a song by Deep Purple.

Child in Time may also refer to:

- Child in Time (album), by the Ian Gillan Band
- The Child in Time, a novel by Ian McEwan
- The Child in Time (film), a British television film, an adaptation of the novel

== See also ==
- Child of Time, a novel by Isaac Asimov and Robert Silverberg
