= List of The Big C episodes =

The Big C is a Showtime original series created by Darlene Hunt and starring Laura Linney. She plays a reserved, fortysomething, suburban wife and mother whose recent cancer diagnosis forces her to shake up her life and find hope, humor and the light side of a dark situation, while managing her immature but well-meaning husband, played by Oliver Platt.

A total of 40 episodes of The Big C were aired over four seasons, between August 16, 2010, and May 20, 2013.

== Series overview ==
The runtime was 27-minutes for seasons 1 through 3, and one-hour for season 4. In syndication, season 4 was recut into half-hour episodes (identified as part 1 and part 2).

Season	Episodes	Originally aired	
Season	Episodes	First aired	Last aired
1	13	August 16, 2010	November 15, 2010
2	13	June 27, 2011	September 26, 2011
3	10	April 8, 2012	June 17, 2012
4	4	April 29, 2013	May 20, 2013

== Episodes ==
=== Season 1 (2010) ===
No. overall	No. in season	Title	Directed by	Written by	Original release date	U.S. viewers (millions)
1	1	"Pilot"	Bill Condon	Darlene Hunt	August 16, 2010	1.16
Cathy Jamison, a reserved suburban wife and teacher in Minneapolis, is diagnosed with stage-four melanoma and has decided against starting chemotherapy. She keeps her diagnosis a secret from her unruly teenage son Adam, and her immature but well-meaning husband Paul, whom she has kicked out of the house. Upon learning of her diagnosis, Cathy decides to build a pool in her backyard, much to the chagrin of her older curmudgeonly neighbor, Marlene. While supervising a summer school class, Cathy is mocked by her overweight student Andrea. When Cathy learns that Andrea wants to lose weight, Cathy devises a weight-loss plan for Andrea, promising to pay her $100 for every pound she loses. Cathy also makes an effort to reconnect with her eccentric homeless brother Sean, whom she has a distant relationship with.
2	2	"Summer Time"	Michael Engler	Darlene Hunt	August 23, 2010	1.07
Cathy meets with her oncologist Dr. Todd Mauer and discovers how much time she has left to live. She continues to keep her diagnosis a secret from Adam, Paul and Sean. After spotting a nude woman openly sunbathing on her front lawn, an inspired Cathy starts to appreciate her body more. Desperate to get more bonding time with her son, Cathy refuses to let Adam attend a six-week long soccer camp, much to his dismay. Upon discovering that Paul has allowed Adam to board the school bus, Cathy follows the bus and forces the driver to pull over before ordering Adam to get off. Andrea continues her weight-loss plan, but doesn't seem to take it seriously. Paul tries to convince Cathy to sign up for couples therapy, but Cathy storms off during their first session and insists that she wants to live apart from each other for the summer.
3	3	"There's No C in Team"	Michael Engler	Jenny Bicks	August 30, 2010	0.875
When her attempts to connect with the people closest to her fail, Cathy signs up for a well-meaning but mostly overbearing cancer support group, who try to encourage Cathy to focus on the positive. Cathy disagrees, asserting that her cancer will cause her to miss out on her family's future life events. Adam rebuffs Cathy's attempts to connect with him. In response, Cathy decides to put together a dinner party with Andrea, Sean, and his girlfriend Daphne. Paul tries to win back Cathy's love with an elaborate romantic gesture, but Cathy is unimpressed by it. Marlene's dog, Thomas, constantly shows up at the Jamison house. Marlene figures out that Cathy has cancer, recounting that Thomas followed her late husband around when he had cancer. The two neighbors ultimately reconcile.
4	4	"Playing the Cancer Car"	Craig Zisk	Mark Kunerth	September 13, 2010	0.874
Cathy, eager to try on a carefree, impulsive persona, cashes out her 401K and buys a convertible. She spends the day house-hunting with Dr. Todd, and the two play along when the realtor assumes that they are a couple. Paul gets back into rugby and bonds with Tina, whom Cathy nicknames "Rugby Slut". Sean goes to great lengths to knock out a tooth without the help of a dentist. Adam gets caught shoplifting and is returned home by the police. Marlene comes to Adam's aid, telling the police that she is Adam's grandma, and blackmails Adam into cleaning her front yard. Dr. Todd confesses to Cathy that he feels bad for having more of a future than she does, but Cathy asserts that her future is with Adam. Cathy then stores the convertible into a secret storage locker, leaving a note gifting it to Adam as a future birthday present.
5	5	"Blue-Eyed Iris"	Craig Zisk	Cara DiPaolo	September 20, 2010	0.709
Sean attempts to fight the city council against demolishing a building that he squats in, and Marlene gives Sean her husband's old clothes to wear for the city council meeting. Sean is ultimately escorted by security for unruly behavior. Paul continues to bond with Tina. Cathy accidentally walks in on Adam masturbating to pornography, after which Adam starts to ignore her. Cathy apologizes and tries to give Adam a talk about sex and relationships. Both Andrea and Cathy develop a crush on Lenny, a new painter at the high school. Cathy gets a bikini wax and flirts with Lenny. Later that day, Lenny shows up at Cathy's classroom and kisses her; the two end up having sex.
6	6	"Taking Lumps"	Alan Poul	Toni Kalem	September 27, 2010	0.728
Cathy continues her affair with Lenny, who notices a strange lump on her backside; Cathy turns to Dr. Todd and schedules a surgery to get the lump removed. Marlene tries to convince Cathy to tell her family about her cancer. Andrea discovers Cathy and Lenny's affair, and she breaks into the school to destroy Lenny's mural. Sean gets severely injured after someone beats him up in his sleeping bag. Cathy insists that Sean move in with her, but Sean will only accept sleeping in the front yard. Cathy enters the family into a charity bathtub race, and the event brings Paul and Cathy back together. Cathy starts to open up to Paul about her cancer, but Paul interrupts, revealing that he had a sexual encounter with Tina. Following her surgery, Cathy calls Lenny to pick her up.
7	7	"Two for the Road"	Alan Poul	Hilly Hicks, Jr.	October 4, 2010	0.624
When Cathy discovers Marlene's distant relationship with her daughters, Cathy organizes a road trip with Sean to visit their estranged father, Donald. With Cathy away, Paul spends the day with Adam and allows him to drink beer; Adam ends up getting drunk and passes out in Marlene's yard, leading Marlene to lecture Paul over his parenting. Cathy and Sean arrive at their father's house; Donald criticizes Cathy for breaking up with Paul, stating that he doesn't see her doing any better than him. Cathy angrily tells her father off for never believing in his children, and she grabs her mother's ashes before leaving. Cathy and Sean spread their mother's ashes in the river, and Cathy reveals her cancer diagnosis. When Sean has an intense emotional breakdown over the news, Cathy reneges and claims she made it up.
8	8	"Happy Birthday, Cancer"	Tricia Brock	Darlene Hunt	October 11, 2010	0.741
As her 43rd birthday approaches, Cathy impulsively takes Lenny up on his offer to accompany him to the Bahamas for the weekend. However, the plan is put on hold when Paul throws Cathy a surprise party at the house. Cathy reunites with her old college roommate Rebecca, whom Paul had invited, and the two reflect on their past. During the party, Rebecca and Sean flirt and have sex, Lenny meets Paul while making a brief visit, and Marlene begins to show signs of Alzheimer's. Cathy gives a speech thanking Paul for the party, stating that she feels genuinely happy for the first time in twenty years. The speech offends Paul, who drunkenly confronts Cathy for dismissing their marriage. Repulsed by Paul, Cathy calls Lenny and tells him that she is joining him at the airport.
9	9	"The Ecstasy and the Agony"	Tricia Brock	Story by : Jenny Bicks; Teleplay by : Hilly Hicks, Jr.	October 18, 2010	0.607
Paul receives a promotion at work but, annoyed by Cathy's impromptu trip to the Bahamas, declines to invite her to the congratulatory dinner. Sean tries to set up Marlene with his friend. Adam attends a party and is taunted by his friends for being a virgin. Dr. Todd informs Cathy that she has not been accepted into the clinical trial, which Cathy was hoping would solve her insurance problem. Upset, Cathy gets high on ecstasy with Lenny and the two have sex. At the same time, Paul returns home and discovers the affair through the house window. At the congratulatory dinner, Paul gets drunk and asks Adam, who does not have a license, to drive him home. Adam ends up crashing the car, and the family convenes at the hospital; Paul confronts Cathy about her affair and calls for a divorce.
10	10	"Divine Intervention"	Michael Lehmann	Mark Kunerth	October 25, 2010	0.705
Marlene lectures Cathy for pursuing an affair with Lenny, proclaiming that Cathy's cancer is not an excuse for her behavior. Following his decision to divorce Cathy, Paul turns to Tina for solace, and the two have sex. Rebecca and Sean continue a sexual relationship, though Rebecca wishes to repair her friendship with Cathy. Rebecca ultimately apologizes to Cathy for being a bad friend, and the two reconcile. Cathy confronts Andrea for dropping out of her class; Andrea, in turn, reveals her knowledge of Cathy's affair with Lenny. In an attempt to get through to Andrea, Cathy attends a mass service at Andrea's parish and profusely apologizes to Andrea for the hurt she has caused. Andrea accepts the apology and agrees to return to class. Cathy finally reveals to Paul that she has cancer.
11	11	"New Beginnings"	Michael Lehmann	Cara DiPaolo	November 1, 2010	0.966
While trying to deal with his wife's cancer, Paul discovers that Cathy is not considering chemotherapy. Paul also lectures Adam for being disrespectful towards his mother. At his work, Paul tries to bond with Cheryl, a co-worker whose husband also had cancer. Rebecca reveals to Sean that she has quit her position and is moving to Minneapolis. When Sean does not seem to be happy about the decision, she angrily throws a coffee mug at him. Adam meets a girl named Mia. Marlene invites Cathy and Rebecca to a lunch buffet, only to discover that the buffet is at a male strip club. Marlene reveals to Cathy that she has Alzheimer's. Paul moves back in with his family. Cathy tells Dr. Todd that she wants to try bee sting therapy to cure her cancer.
12	12	"Everything That Rises Must Converge"	Michael Engler	Jenny Bicks	November 8, 2010	0.800
Cathy and Dr. Todd go to Canada to seek out the Bee Man for his non-traditional bee sting therapy. Upon meeting with the Bee Man, Cathy and Dr. Todd realize the Bee Man is a lunatic and leave. The two later have drinks at a local bar; Dr. Todd reveals that he cares about Cathy and kisses her. Cathy does not return the kiss, stating that Todd has to pick the girl that lives. Adam begins dating Mia and gets advice from Sean. While doing chores at Marlene's house, Adam gets confronted by Marlene, who does not recognize him; she pulls a gun on Adam and orders him to leave. When Marlene returns to lucidity, Paul orders her to stay away from Adam. Disturbed by what she has done, Marlene shoots herself in the head. She leaves a suicide note for Cathy, thanking her for being a friend, and encouraging her to live her life as best as she can.
13	13	"Taking the Plunge"	Michael Engler	Darlene Hunt	November 15, 2010	0.957
At Marlene's funeral, Cathy learns that Marlene has left her the house. Rebecca reveals to Sean that she is pregnant, and that he's the father. After some contemplation, Sean visits Rebecca and agrees to be present in the baby's life. Upon discovering Rebecca's pregnancy, Cathy gives Sean the keys to Marlene's house. Dr. Todd informs Cathy about trying Interleukin-2 cancer treatment. Paul expresses concerns about the treatment's risks and side effects, but Cathy decides to go through with the treatment anyway. Cathy and Paul reveal Cathy's cancer to Adam, but are put off by his nonchalant reaction. Later that night, Adam discovers the keys to Cathy's secret storage locker. He visits the storage locker and discovers it is filled with hundreds of gifts for his future birthdays, holidays and major life events. Realizing his mother doesn't have long to live, Adam breaks down crying. While starting her first round of treatment, Cathy experiences a vision of herself diving into a pool in her backyard with Marlene.

=== Season 2 (2011) ===
No. overall	No. in season	Title	Directed by	Written by	Original release date	U.S. viewers (millions)
14	1	"Losing Patients"	Michael Engler	Darlene Hunt	June 27, 2011	0.891
After doing two rounds of treatment, Dr. Todd reveals that Cathy's tumors are unchanged, and that her kidney function has deteriorated. He advises Cathy to deal with the side effects, suggesting medical marijuana for the pain. Paul and Cathy's marriage seems to be improving, but Paul is hurt upon learning of her kiss with Dr. Todd. He confronts Dr. Todd, who apologizes for his actions. Cathy wants Adam to continue his therapy appointments, but Adam wishes to be with his friends. Sean and Rebecca have begun a serious relationship. Cathy reveals her cancer to Rebecca, who informs Sean. Sean is hurt and angry with Cathy for keeping her cancer a secret. Cathy and Paul seek out the help of Dr. Atticus Sherman, whom they are told has had success curing people with Cathy's advanced stage of cancer.
15	2	"Musical Chairs"	Michael Engler	Jenny Bicks	July 4, 2011	0.583
Cathy expresses interest in taking part in Dr. Sherman's latest medical trial, only to learn that it is full. A spot later opens up in Dr. Sherman's trial, but Cathy is saddened to discover it has only opened because another patient had died. Cathy returns to work, only to discover that everyone is aware of her condition, making her feel uncomfortable. Adam is also dismayed by the attention he's getting because of Cathy's cancer. After attending her sonogram appointment, Rebecca wants Cathy to host an impromptu baby shower, to Cathy's dismay. During the baby shower, Rebecca announces that she wants to name her baby "Cathy" as an homage, and reveals Cathy's cancer to the guests. Cathy apologizes to Sean for keeping her cancer a secret, and encourages him to continue taking his bipolar medication.
16	3	"Sexual Healing"	Miguel Arteta	Mark Kunerth	July 11, 2011	0.528
Andrea informs Cathy that her parents are moving to Ghana for missionary work; Cathy invites Andrea to move in with her, so Andrea can graduate with her class and go to university. Cathy and Paul haven't had sex in two months because of Cathy's illness. Paul insists he is fine with staying abstinent, but later, Andrea accidentally walks in on Paul masturbating. Following the incident, Paul apologizes to Andrea and admits to Cathy that he misses sex. Sean has begun taking his bipolar medication, and Rebecca is put off by his new observant personality. Adam is unsatisfied in his relationship with Mia, who is not quite ready to get intimate. Adam ends up cheating on Mia, having sex with a classmate named Emily.
17	4	"Boo!"	Miguel Arteta	Cara DiPaolo	July 18, 2011	0.617
On the first day of her clinical trial, Cathy is put off by Lee, a fellow cancer patient who pulls a prank on Cathy and Paul in the parking lot. As she prepares to begin the clinical trial, Cathy learns that she cannot start that day because she does not have an insurance approval form. Sean begins hearing weird noises in Marlene's house. He initially believes the house is being haunted by Marlene's ghost, only to discover the source of the noise: a white owl in the attic. Adam gets into trouble at school when he starts a fight with a bully. He begins to feel smothered by Emily, who believes they are in a serious relationship; Adam ultimately confronts Emily and breaks things off with her. Paul gets laid off from his job, losing the insurance for Cathy's treatment in the process.
18	5	"Cats and Dogs"	Jennifer Getzinger	Melanie Marnich	July 25, 2011	0.506
Desperate for a new job, Paul reconnects with an old friend, Jimmy, whose company is hiring. However, Paul discovers that the new position at Jimmy's company does not cover health insurance. In an effort to make more money, Cathy decides to sell her jewelry and spots Lee on her way to the pawn shop. The two spend the day together, having frank discussions about cancer and death. Sean is kicked out of a local park after approaching mothers for their babies to test out his homemade baby sling. With his parents out of the house, Adam pretends to be eighteen and calls a dominatrix hooker. They have sex in Cathy's bed, but Adam is forced to call Sean to bail him out when he is unable to pay the hooker's $250 fee. Paul ends up landing a job at an electronics store, providing Cathy with health insurance.
19	6	"The Little c"	Jennifer Getzinger	Hilly Hicks, Jr.	August 1, 2011	0.572
Cathy gets a new job as a swimming coach at her high school, though some of the parents do not have confidence in her coaching abilities. Sean wants to propose to Rebecca. Paul bonds with his Ukrainian co-worker Myk, who expresses a romantic interest in Andrea. Adam discovers that he has contracted crabs from his encounter with the hooker, and has inadvertently exposed Cathy and Paul. Upon discovering the news, Cathy confronts Mia, believing Adam got the crabs from her; Mia angrily breaks up with Adam, realizing he has cheated on her. Following the crabs outbreak, the principal and parents tell Cathy to resign from her swim coach position, and imply that she only received the job because she has cancer. Cathy refuses, boldly warning them to hire a lawyer if they try to fire the "lady with cancer."
20	7	"Goldilocks and the Bears"	Michael Engler	Cusi Cram	August 8, 2011	0.492
Cathy grows worried about the clinical trial, as none of the side effects that indicates the treatment is working are occurring. After being encouraged by Lee and Sean, Cathy decides to try acupuncture treatment. The acupuncturist notes that Cathy's blood pressure goes down every time Lee is in the room, and attributes that relaxation to her and Lee being soulmates, despite the fact that Lee is gay. Later that day, Lee invites Cathy and Paul to have drinks at a local gay bar. Myk and Andrea go on their first date. Sean consoles Adam over his break-up with Mia. Cathy has an unexpected sexual encounter with Lee over the phone, causing Cathy to question if it's possible to have more than one soulmate. Cathy reveals to Paul that one of her fingernails is gone – a side effect of the cancer treatment.
21	8	"The Last Thanksgiving"	Michael Engler	Darlene Hunt	August 15, 2011	0.527
Cathy is elated that the cancer treatment is working, but she makes the family promise not to tell Lee, as he has not experienced any side effects yet. Paul confronts Myk for stealing items from the electronic store; Myk reveals that there is a line item in the corporation's budget to allow for 3% loss or theft in merchandise, and Paul asks to take part in his scheme. The Jamisons host a Thanksgiving dinner, and Cathy invites Lee. During the dinner, Andrea and Myk profess their love for each other, Rebecca and Sean get engaged, and Lee discovers that Cathy has been wearing fake nails. Realizing Cathy is pitying him, Lee lashes out at Cathy, stating that the clinical trial will not work and is merely giving her more time. After Lee storms out, Rebecca begins feeling ill and leaves early. Sean is later seen calling an ambulance for Rebecca.
22	9	"A Little Death"	Ryan Fleck & Anna Boden	Jenny Bicks	August 22, 2011	0.624
Following her miscarriage, Rebecca organizes a symbolic burial, while a grieving Sean has stopped taking his medications. In an effort to make more money, Paul has begun helping Myk lift and sell items from the electronic store. Adam joins an online cancer support group and bonds with a girl named Poppy. Adam and Poppy meet up in real life, and Adam discovers that Poppy is actually a middle-aged woman whose father has lung cancer. Rebecca posts the funeral information for her miscarried baby online; many of Cathy's old friends show up, mistakenly believing that the funeral is for adult Cathy. During the funeral, Sean goes off the rails and gives a vulgar speech to the crowd. Realizing she cannot pursue a relationship with Sean, Rebecca packs her bags and says goodbye to Cathy, revealing that she is moving back to Chicago.
23	10	"How Do You Feel?"	Anna Boden & Ryan Fleck	Mark Kunerth	August 29, 2011	0.704
Cathy and Lee reconcile, and Cathy vows to be honest with him about how things are progressing with her health. During another round of treatment, Cathy learns that her tumors are shrinking, but Lee's are growing. Despite the bad news, Lee tries to remain positive and upbeat. Paul buys Cathy a body composition scale. After testing out the scale himself, Paul discovers he is in poor health and needs to lose weight. Adam and Poppy continue to bond, and Poppy invites Adam to her high school class reunion, as she wants to impress her former classmates. Adam accompanies Poppy to the reunion and pretends to be Poppy's wealthy 21-year-old boyfriend. They have a good time, although Adam later notices that Poppy has cut herself in the bathroom. Following Rebecca's departure, Sean has spiralled out of control. At the end of the episode, Cathy discovers that Sean has run away.
24	11	"Fight or Flight"	Craig Zisk	Cara DiPoalo & Melanie Marnich	September 12, 2011	0.535
While the Jamisons search around town for Sean, Lee informs Cathy that he is dropping out of Dr. Sherman's clinical trial, as he hasn't been making any progress. Lee also reveals that he is moving out of the city following the Minneapolis New Year's Eve Marathon. Cathy is angry with Lee for giving up, but Lee feels he is at peace with dying. During a swim practice, Cathy runs into Dr. Sherman and his younger wife Gia, who invites Cathy and Paul over for dinner; Cathy reluctantly agrees. Cathy confronts Paul for his shoplifting scheme at work. Paul continues working towards losing weight, and discovers that Myk has been snorting cocaine; Myk gives him a share of the drugs. Myk also proposes to Andrea, who happily accepts, much to Cathy's dismay. Cathy's swim team wins the championship. Following the win, Cathy reveals to Paul and Adam that she wants to take a trip to Italy.
25	12	"The Darkest Day"	Craig Zisk	Jenny Bicks	September 19, 2011	0.454
Cathy is asked by Dr. Sherman to attend a university class as a guest. Cathy agrees, but is put off by the cold demeanor of the students. Paul's cocaine addiction worsens. Adam discovers that Poppy's father had actually died several years ago. Realizing that Poppy has been lying, Adam confronts her and ends their friendship; Poppy reveals that she was greatly affected by her father's death, and tells Adam that you lose a part of yourself when a parent passes. As the Jamisons prepare to leave for Italy, Cathy tries to convince Andrea to call off her engagement with Myk. Paul learns that Myk is really marrying Andrea for a green card, and exposes Myk's real intentions to Andrea. Devastated and hurt, Andrea reports Myk to the INS. Upon receiving a call from Lee, Cathy visits Lee's apartment and discovers him in rapidly deteriorating health. She spends the night with Lee, causing the family to miss their flight. Lee ends up passing away. The following day, Sean returns home.
26	13	"Crossing the Line"	Michael Engler	Darlene Hunt	September 26, 2011	0.431
Sean reveals that, in his absence, he had been working at a travelling carnival. Following Lee's death, Cathy decides to run the New Year's Eve marathon he had been planning to take part in, although Dr. Todd strongly advises Cathy against running in the marathon. Adam and Mia rekindle their relationship. Paul quits his job to avoid taking random drug tests, and Cathy learns of his cocaine addiction. With insurance bills mounting, Paul crashes the agency's party to berate them. Despite Dr. Todd's warnings, Cathy takes part in the marathon anyway, and the family shows up to cheer her on. As Cathy approaches the finish line of her marathon, she sees her family and friends, including Lee and Marlene, waiting for her; Adam then remarks how Paul isn't there yet. Cathy begins to sob and collapses when she sees Paul's spirit standing with Lee and Marlene. Paul is then shown to have suffered a heart attack at the insurance agency, with paramedics racing to revive him.

=== Season 3 (2012) ===
No. overall	No. in season	Title	Directed by	Written by	Original release date	U.S. viewers (millions)
27	1	"Thin Ice"	Michael Engler	Darlene Hunt	April 8, 2012	0.581
Three weeks after the previous season's finale, it is revealed that Paul has survived his heart attack, and the near-death experience has pushed him and Cathy to ask Sean to be Adam's guardian in the event of their deaths. Needing an escape from life, Cathy has created a double life for herself at the Naked Turtle Pub; she smokes, drinks, flirts with the bartender, and goes by the name Alexis. Andrea, having returned from visiting her parents, has developed a strong sense of her black identity, and has renamed herself Ababu. Sean has begun taking his medication again, and he still mourns his break-up with Rebecca and the loss of their unborn child. With the help of Sean, Andrea moves on from her failed engagement with Myk by burning her wedding dress. Dr. Sherman happily informs Cathy that her tumors are continuing to shrink.
28	2	"What's Your Story?"	Michael Engler	Mark Kunerth	April 15, 2012	0.465
Paul creates a public online blog recounting his life leading up to his heart attack. Unaware of how public the blog really is, Paul includes details about Cathy's affair with Lenny; Adam reads Paul's blog and becomes angry with his mother. Feeling that his prayers may have helped some of his mother's tumors disappear, Adam joins the school Bible group and meets a girl named Jessie. Meanwhile, Sean gets a job as the school janitor, while Andrea tries to revive the Black Students Association. Cathy is reprimanded by her boss for showing up to work inebriated. Sean hooks up a phone line at his home and finds out that the last person who had the number was a gay phone sex operator. At the Naked Turtle Pub, Cathy gets to know more about her fellow bar patrons. Inspired by a conversation with the bartender, Cathy gets a tattoo on her back of the letter C.
29	3	"Bundle of Joy"	Adam Bernstein	Jenny Bicks	April 22, 2012	0.442
Sean has begun a lucrative occupation as a gay sex phone operator, to Cathy's bewilderment. Paul's blog begins getting more traction. Adam attends a Christian rock concert with Jessie and begins to rethink his relationship with Mia. Sean and Andrea share a Valentine's Day dinner at a restaurant, pretending to be a couple who then have to improvise during dessert. Seeking direction in their lives, Cathy and Paul attend a weekend retreat hosted by life coach Joy Kleinman, a "joyologist" who beat cancer. Upon arriving at the retreat, Cathy is put off by Joy, who encourages the audience to focus on the positive aspects of cancer and makes the claim that you can cure cancer by "embracing joy." During the seminar, Joy instructs Cathy and the crowd to imagine a moment of pure joy; Cathy imagines Adam as an infant, and later reveals to Paul that she wants to have another baby.
30	4	"Family Matters"	Adam Bernstein	Cara DiPaolo	April 29, 2012	0.429
Both Adam and Sean are upset about Cathy's wish to have another child. Upon meeting with an adoption agency, Cathy discovers that she and Paul are unable to adopt a child because of her cancer. Sean is harassed by Willy Wanker, the irate previous owner of his phone number, who accuses Sean of stealing his phone sex business. Adam continues to bond with Jessie, who runs through traffic with him to prove that God is "protecting" them. Cathy and Paul attend Joy's latest seminar; Joy, seeing potential in Paul's blog, decides to introduce Paul up on stage to tell people of his heart attack experience. After receiving applause from the crowd, Joy expresses interest in hiring Paul to become a motivational speaker for her seminars. Cathy writes on Paul's blog of their desire to have a baby. The following day, Cathy and Paul receive a message from a young couple who wishes to meet with them.
31	5	"Face Off"	Jennifer Getzinger	Melanie Marnich	May 6, 2012	0.483
Paul and Cathy meet with the young couple, Dave and Maxine, who are willing to give up their unborn baby for adoption. However, Dave and Maxine also reveal that they are meeting with other couples, leading Cathy to try to showcase her and Paul's parenting skills to impress the couple. Cathy barges in on Adam's Bible study group and discovers that Adam is dating Jessie; Adam confronts Cathy for being judgemental of his friends. Andrea helps Paul try to improve his image before his big debut as a motivational speaker. Paul has a rough speaking debut but then recovers by "flipping that switch", prompting an appealing offer from Joy. Dave and Maxine visit the Jamison house and decide to give Cathy and Paul their baby after speaking with Adam. Adam later informs Cathy that he is moving in with Sean, and that he lied to Dave and Maxine about her being a good mother.
32	6	"Life Rights"	Jennifer Getzinger	Hilly Hicks, Jr.	May 13, 2012	0.417
Sean gives Cathy an old crib as a present for the upcoming arrival of her adopted baby. Cathy learns that Dave and Maxine are expecting a daughter, and Cathy expresses interest in hiring Dave to renovate the upcoming nursery. Sean confronts Adam over Jessie's religious beliefs after catching him having anal sex with Jessie, who believes she is retaining her technical virginity through anal intercourse. Desperate to get out of the house, Sean meets with Tim, one of his phone sex clients; Tim introduces Sean to his wife, Giselle, and they engage in a threesome. Joy introduces Paul and Cathy to Rita Strauss, a Hollywood producer who wants to make a movie about Paul's life. During a dinner with Joy and Rita, Cathy grows upset when Rita reveals that she wants to end the movie with Cathy's character dying. Cathy storms out and criticizes Paul for failing to prioritize their plans to adopt a baby.
33	7	"How Bazaar"	Jann Turner	Cusi Cram	May 20, 2012	0.450
As Dave begins renovations on the exterior wall of the nursery, Cathy decides to increase her level of generosity towards the couple by paying for their expenses. Sean begins a polyamorous relationship with Tom and Giselle. Paul and Andrea join Joy on a speaking engagement in Omaha. Joy invites Paul to Puerto Rico for Easter for further professional development, but Andrea suspects that Joy wants to begin an affair with Paul. Adam does his part in donating items for the church bazaar; Cathy is shocked to discover that Adam had donated the convertible from her secret storage locker as a grand prize. Cathy takes up target shooting with the bartender from the Naked Turtle Pub to vent her frustrations, and then returns to the bazaar to take back the convertible. Intending to give the car to Dave and Maxine, Cathy arrives at their apartment and discovers that Maxine is not actually pregnant.
34	8	"Killjoy"	Jann Turner	Mark Kunerth	June 3, 2012	0.589
Upon discovering Dave and Maxine's deception, Cathy holds them at gunpoint before leaving them stranded in the middle of the woods. After receiving empty comfort from Paul over the adoption scam, Cathy takes up smoking pot. Tim and Giselle break up with Sean. Paul learns about Cathy's double life while visiting the Naked Turtle Pub, and is perturbed to learn that Cathy had told the other patrons that her husband died of a heart attack. Andrea expresses her concerns about Joy and Paul's relationship to Cathy; Cathy investigates Paul's laptop and discovers a recent email from Joy, stating that she is going to "flip his switch" in Puerto Rico. Cathy confronts Joy at the hotel she is staying at and publicly lambasts her for making advances towards Paul. Joy warns Cathy about her negativity before being hit by a bus.
35	9	"Vaya Con Dios"	Michael Engler	Jenny Bicks	June 10, 2012	0.499
The Jamisons, along with Andrea and Sean, go off to Puerto Rico for Paul's speaking engagement. Paul, mourning Joy's death, realizes that he has big shoes to fill in replacing Joy; Andrea, tired of Paul's demanding behavior, quits her job as Paul's assistant. Paul angrily confronts Cathy for her secret alias at the bar, and reveals that he struggles to envision a future for their marriage. Cathy and Adam have a discussion in a church about Adam's religious beliefs. Despite vowing to give up sex in the short-term while getting over the break up with Tim and Giselle, Sean meets a new love at a scuba diving lesson. Cathy receives a call from Dr. Sherman, who gives her sobering news in regards to the latest results of her progress. Following the call, Cathy and Sean go scuba diving; Sean loses Cathy, who goes further into the ocean and gets separated from the rest of the group.
36	10	"Fly Away"	Michael Engler	Darlene Hunt	June 17, 2012	0.445
While scuba diving alone, Cathy gets caught in a fishing net; she urges the fisherman who caught her to take her back to San Juan, even though he speaks no English. Unaware that Cathy is missing, Paul picks up a woman using the same double identity idea Cathy used at the Naked Turtle Club, while Adam and Andrea attend the San Juan Good Friday parade. Cathy figures out that the fisherman's name is Angel, and the two spend time together on his fishing boat. Cathy tearfully reveals to Angel that her tumors are growing despite the clinical trials, and that she may die within a year. As the boat returns to San Juan, Cathy changes her mind and dives back into the ocean to join Angel, whose boat is heading towards Esperanza.

=== Season 4: Hereafter (2013) ===
No. overall	No. in season	Title	Directed by	Written by	Original release date	U.S. viewers (millions)
37	1	"Quality of Life"	Michael Engler	Darlene Hunt	April 29, 2013	0.238
In Puerto Rico, paramedics tend to Cathy after she gets lost in the ocean while scuba diving; Cathy experiences a vivid hallucination of Angel and his fishing boat triggered by her growing tumors. Five months later, Cathy's health worsens as her tumors continue to grow, and she interprets her hallucination of Angel as a symbol of her angel of death. Cathy and Paul's relationship is cordial, although Cathy confides to her therapist that she feels Paul is waiting for her to die to move on. Paul's new career as a motivational speaker is thriving and he is writing a self-help book. Andrea struggles to deal with her roommate at college, and she moves back in with the Jamisons. Cathy learns that Dr. Sherman is suffering from advanced stage colon cancer after seeing him at the clinic as a patient. Inspired by a talk with Dr. Sherman, Cathy quits her job to prioritize spending time with her family. Cathy also decides to stop chemotherapy treatment, knowing she will die regardless. She reveals the news to Adam, who accepts her decision, and she takes him to her storage locker to open all the presents she bought for his future birthdays.
38	2	"You Can't Take It with You"	Jann Turner	Cara DiPaolo & Melanie Marnich	May 6, 2013	0.253
Two months later, an upbeat Cathy begins donating her old clothes to lessen the burden on her family. Wanting to do something meaningful and life-affirming in light of what is happening to Cathy, Sean decides to donate a kidney to a stranger. Distracted by Cathy's cancer, Andrea struggles in her college fashion classes and is encouraged by her professor Isaac Mizrahi to drop the class. Cathy approaches Andrea about creating a dress for her to wear in her coffin. Adam struggles to pass chemistry and Cathy hires a tutor, Lydia; Lydia wants to lose her virginity before attending college and convinces Adam to have sex with her. In the end though, Lydia decides to wait, and helps Adam pass chemistry. Cathy experiences paralysis in one of her legs due to the tumor pressing on her brain. Following a speaking engagement in Detroit, Paul realizes that he wants to make amends with Cathy. Cathy ponders if Paul will remarry following her death, and she creates a profile for Paul on an online dating website for widows and widowers. At the end of the episode, a confused and disoriented Cathy experiences memory loss while cooking breakfast and asks Paul who he is.
39	3	"Quality of Death"	Richard Heus	Jenny Bicks	May 13, 2013	0.251
Cathy decides to go live at a hospice, which upsets the whole family. Cathy expresses relief to her therapist that her family does not have to worry about her care. Sean debates his organ donation options as he ponders the slim possibility of dying during the operation. After witnessing her hospice roommate suddenly pass away, Cathy realizes that she is not ready to die, and she experiences another vision of Angel in the hospice hallway. Paul becomes depressed as he realizes that Cathy will not be around for much longer; Adam fires Paul's assistant and berates Paul for failing to take care of his family. Paul finally visits Cathy, who advises him to be strong for Adam. Cathy is visited by Dr. Sherman, only to discover from the nurse that Dr. Sherman had actually died a week earlier from colon cancer. For her assignment, Andrea submits the dress she had designed for Cathy to wear at her funeral, but refuses to cut the dress to fit a slimmer model for the fashion show. Cathy leaves her hospice for an evening and surprises the family by modelling Andrea's dress on the runway.
40	4	"The Finale"	Michael Engler	Jenny Bicks & Darlene Hunt	May 20, 2013	0.390
As Cathy prepares for her impending death, she contemplates getting closure with her father, who does not know of her condition. Cathy's four months of insurance coverage expires and she leaves the hospice to return home. Sean learns his kidney is going to a wealthy man, who is grateful and tries to give him a Rolex. This blatant materialism offends Sean, although he decides to go through with the kidney donation. Andrea is offered an internship in New York by her professor. She initially rejects the offer, but Cathy convinces her to take the internship, even if it means Andrea will not be there when she dies. Paul brings Cathy's father to see her so that they can make amends. Adam is revealed to have been taking extra courses to graduate a year early, allowing Cathy to complete her wish of seeing him earn his high school diploma. Paul goes off to buy Cathy's flowers she wanted as her wedding flowers, only to return home and discover that she has died peacefully. Cathy's therapist is revealed to have been a higher being, and Cathy is seen taking Angel's hand into the afterlife. The series concludes with Cathy floating in a swimming pool with Marlene and Thomas.
