= Leftover Cuties =

American band

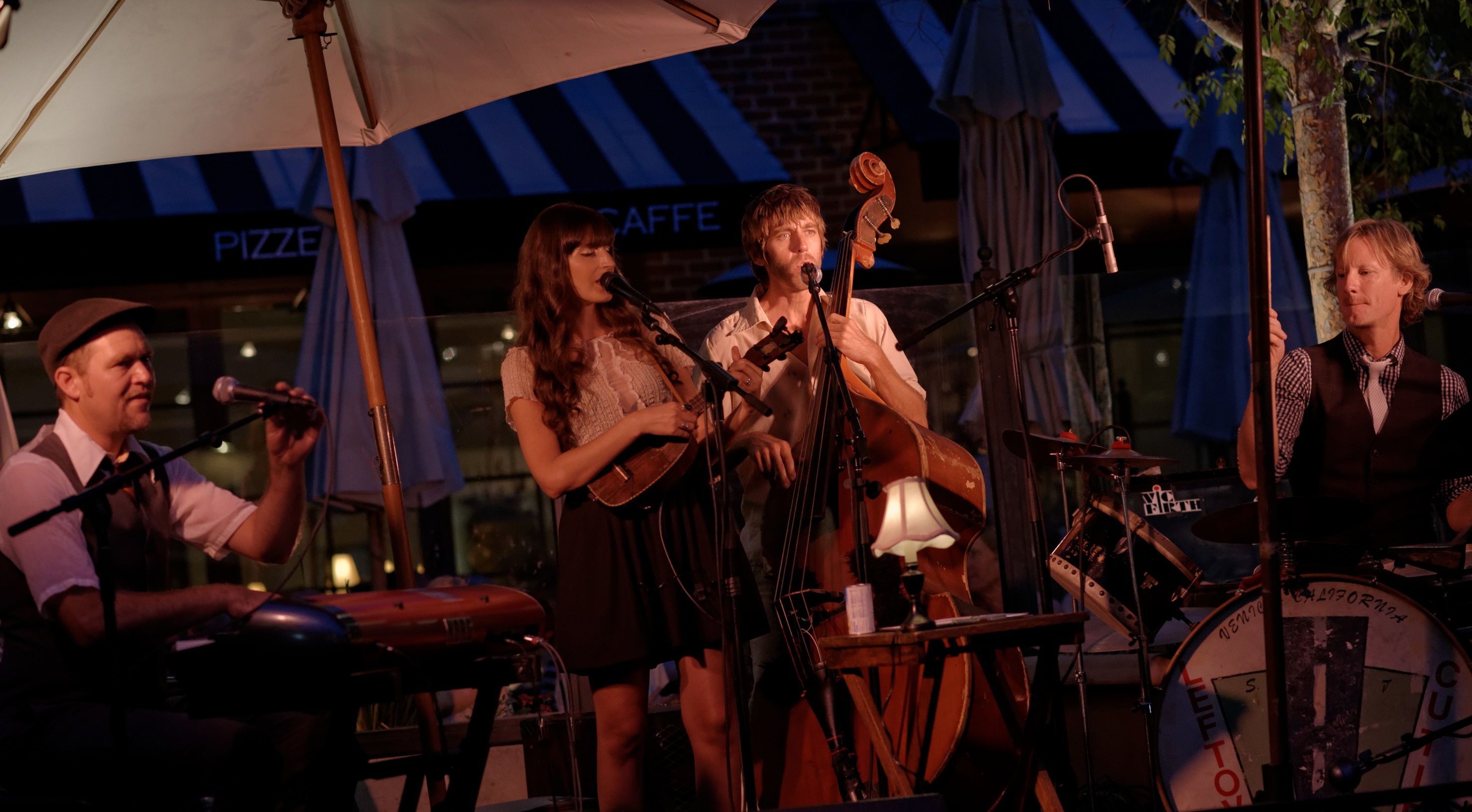
- Leftover Cuties performing in 2014

Background information
- Origin: Los Angeles
- Years active: 2008–present
- Members: Shirli McAllen; Austin Nicholsen; Mike Bolger; Stuart Johnson
- Website: leftovercuties.com

Leftover Cuties are an American band formed in Los Angeles, California, in 2008. The band consists of Shirli McAllen (lead vocals, ukulele), Austin Nicholsen (bass, vocals), Mike Bolger (brass, keys, accordion, vocals), and Stuart Johnson (drums, percussion, vocals). The Showtime original series The Big C used a song by the band as its theme music. The band has received coverage in Paste magazine and The A.V. Club. The band's most recent album, Little Big Room, was released March 27, 2020.

== Discography ==
Album	Year
Game Called Life	2009
Places to Go	2011
Departures	2012
Christmas Time Is Here	2012
The Spark & the Fire	2013
Little Big Room	2020
