= The Merry Gentleman =

- Theatrical release poster
- Directed by: Michael Keaton
- Written by: Ron Lazzeretti
- Produced by: Ron Lazzeretti; Steven A. Jones; Tom Bastounes
- Starring: Michael Keaton; Kelly Macdonald; Mike Bradecich; Darlene Hunt; Debbi Burns; Maritza Cabrera
- Cinematography: Chris Seager
- Edited by: Grant Myers
- Music by: Edward Shearmur
- Distributed by: Samuel Goldwyn Films
- Release dates: January 18, 2008 (Sundance Film Festival); May 1, 2009 (United States)
- Running time: 96 minutes
- Country: United States
- Language: English
- Box office: $322,581

The Merry Gentleman is a 2008 American neo-noir film directed by Michael Keaton (in his directorial debut), and starring Keaton and Kelly Macdonald. It is about a woman who leaves an abusive relationship to start a new life in Chicago, where she forms a friendship with a hitman who is undergoing his own emotional crisis.

== Plot ==
The Merry Gentleman is the story of Kate, a young woman who flees her abusive policeman husband, moving to Chicago. In her new life, she befriends a co-worker but otherwise generally keeps to herself, due to her embarrassment over a black eye left over from her husband's latest attack. Most everyone she encounters is of low character, which reinforces her feelings of loneliness and reclusion.

One night, she is seen in an office window through the rifle scope of professional hit man Frank Logan, who is on the roof of the opposite building, as he prepares to shoot the occupant on another floor. Afterwards, rather than leaving, he removes his hat and steps out on to the ledge as he apparently prepares to jump. As Kate steps out onto the sidewalk, she looks up at the falling snow and sees Frank on the ledge. She cries out, startling him into safely falling backward onto the roof.

She decides to bring a small bit of joy to her life by buying a Christmas tree. Later that night, she encounters Frank at her apartment building. She doesn't recognize him as the man on the roof, and he helps her carry the big Christmas tree to her apartment. He later returns to meet with her, but collapses from pneumonia before he can reveal why he's there. Kate rushes him to the hospital, and despite the awkwardness of their conversation there, they develop a friendship that has hints of romance. Some time after his release, she mentions the old hat that he wears and wonders about "the things it has seen," unknowingly referring to the many men that Frank has murdered. Meanwhile, Kate also becomes the romantic interest of Murcheson, the detective investigating Frank's latest murder. Murcheson asks Kate to stop by her office after work, presumably to discuss the case, but he has hoped it to be a date, and does not communicate these intentions. Kate cuts the meeting short when she realizes Murcheson's romantic interest.

Initially, the police remain oblivious to the fact that Frank is a professional killer, due to his framing the murder on another man, who he then killed in a manner to make the police suspect suicide. However, complications arrive when Kate's husband, Det. Michael Elkhart, tracks her down and breaks into her apartment. Michael swears he has become a safe and spiritual man, but the encounter leaves Kate badly shaken. She turns to Murcheson for help, but before he can intervene, Frank fatally shoots Michael in his motel room and makes it look like a suicide. The police begin to suspect that Frank may be behind all three deaths.

Murcheson asks Kate out on a second date, which she reluctantly accepts. The date turns horribly awkward, however, when he reveals that he suspects Frank to be a killer. Feeling guilty about her dead husband and disturbed by Murcheson's suspicions, she visits a church. Frank finds her there, but she is not comforted by his promise never to hurt her. Frank leaves the church and quietly walks out of her life, choosing not to subject her to the fear of knowing a professional killer.

The exact details of Frank's departure remain ambiguous. Apparently considering suicide, he drives to a high bridge over a forest and tosses his hat into the river far below. Then another car arrives and a man comes out. We later see Frank retrieve his hat from the water. Unsatisfied with his dreary day job as a tailor, having left behind the only pleasant aspect of his life, and placing the familiar symbol of his sinister side back on his head, he walks off into the woods.

== Cast ==
- Michael Keaton as Frank Logan
- Kelly Macdonald as Kate Frazier
- Tom Bastounes as Murcheson
- Bobby Cannavale as Michael Elkhart
- David Dino Wells Jr. as Passerby
- Darlene Hunt as Diane
- Guy van Swearingen as Goldman
- William Dick as Mr. Weiss

== Production notes ==
Ron Lazzeretti had planned on directing the projected film, and was in discussion with Michael Keaton regarding Keaton's playing one of the lead roles. A few days before production was scheduled to begin, Lazzeretti suffered a ruptured appendix and underwent extensive treatment. As it became evident that the project would either wither or be completely canceled, Keaton suggested that he would direct it if the producers desired (he had been looking for a project with which to make his directorial debut). They agreed, but a dispute soon arose between the producers and Keaton on his alleged lack of effort in cutting and promoting the movie. They sued for breach of contract, leading to Merry Gentleman, LLC v. George & Leona Prods., Inc. The movie was filmed in Chicago, Illinois, in 26 days from early March thru mid-April 2007. Many of the producers, principals, supporting actors and tradespeople involved with the film were residents of Chicago.

Other parts of the movie were also filmed in Bourbonnais, Illinois and at the Kankakee River State Park.

== Critical reception ==
The film was presented at the 2008 Sundance Film Festival, and released to theatres on May 1, 2009, to positive reviews. As of June 2020, the film holds a 65% approval rating on Rotten Tomatoes, based on 77 reviews with an average rating of 5.91/10. The website's critics consensus reads: "Michael Keaton's directorial debut, The Merry Gentleman, is a slow character study aided greatly by the performances of Keaton and Kelly MacDonald." Lisa Schwarzbaum of Entertainment Weekly wrote of the film, "This Debbie Downer of a drama is a bitter slug".
