= Birth (Once Upon a Time) =

- Once Upon a Time episode
- Episode no.: Season 5 Episode 8
- Directed by: Eagle Egilsson
- Written by: David H. Goodman; Jerome Schwartz
- Production code: 508
- Original air date: November 15, 2015

Guest appearances
- David Anders as Victor Frankenstein / Dr. Whale; Beverley Elliott as Granny / Widow Lucas; Liam Garrigan as King Arthur; Elliot Knight as Merlin; Joana Metrass as Queen Guinevere

Episode chronology
← Previous "Nimue"	Next → "The Bear King"
- Once Upon a Time season 5

"Birth" is the eighth episode of the fifth season of the American fantasy drama series Once Upon a Time, which aired on November 15, 2015. The episode serves as the first part of a 2-episode airing night that were unrelated, with the second part being "The Bear King".

In this episode, Emma saves her parents, Regina, Hook, and Robin from King Arthur and Zelena. In Storybrooke, Hook and Zelena become allies.

== Plot ==
=== Opening sequence ===
The emerging new Dark One from the vault appears in the forest.

=== Event chronology ===
The Camelot scene at the mes place after "Nimue" and before "Broken Heart". The Enchanted Forest and Storybrooke events take place after "Nimue".

=== In the Enchanted Forest, outside Camelot ===
Three weeks earlier in Camelot, Emma brings a box with the Spark of the Promethean Flame in it to Granny's Diner, and she tells Henry that she can reunite the sword with it. Henry tells her that the others are not back with Arthur's fragment of Excalibur, and Emma says that Merlin is missing too. Granny and Henry begin to lock up the shop, but before they can finish, they are frozen with magic by Merlin, who is there and being forced to follow Arthur's orders, due to him being tethered to the Excalibur fragment. He says that Arthur tethered him to Excalibur and has ordered him to unite the sword, with the Promethean Flame. Emma refuses to hand it over, and Merlin says that Arthur has her family and will force him to kill them unless she hands over the Dagger of the Dark One and the flame. Emma says that it's not a flame yet, just a spark since she hasn't had enough time to light it yet, but Merlin tells her that with her power, she will be able to light it when she's ready. Emma then says she can't give up without a fight. But Merlin tells her that "acceptance is a form of strength," begs her not to seek vengeance and not to make the same mistakes as Nimue.

Emma tries to ignite the spark into a flame when Rumplestiltskin's manifestation appears and says that Arthur will kill her if he reunites Excalibur, but she says she has no choice and can't risk the lives of her family. Rumple's manifestation says that she can only light it when she's ready to give up the darkness. As the manifestation tries to goad Emma into lighting the flame, Emma loses her temper and yells at him to stop. Henry finds Emma talking to herself, and he asks what she's doing, and what the "voices" said. Emma says that they told her she wasn't ready to give up the darkness. He shows her a photo of a house that he and Hook were looking at for their Operation Light Swan, which Hook planned to obtain for Emma after she was free of the Darkness. Henry tells her that it was a reminder of something she could look forward to. Emma shuts the lid on the spark and says that she's not ready to give up the darkness just yet because she has to use her dark magic one more time.

Emma goes to the woods and sees Arthur, Merlin, and Zelena, with Emma's family tied to trees. She tells him to free them but Arthur wants Emma to hand over the dagger, and spark or else he'll "unleash" Merlin, and brought along Zelena to make sure she complies, asking Emma if she should kill Hook or David first. Emma hands Zelena the spark but when she opens it Zelena discovers that it's a fake, containing a spell that binds her to a tree. Furious that Emma tricked him, Arthur orders Merlin to fight her, and they battle by using magic. Merlin says he wishes Emma could defeat him, but that he's too experienced, and Merlin knocks her back. Arthur, believing he has the upper hand, orders Merlin to kill Mary Margaret, which he does by choking her with one of the tree's vines. Emma then pleads with Merlin to fight back against Arthur, telling him that he is the greatest sorcerer of all time and that if he can't fight off the darkness, no one can. Merlin struggles, but successfully fights off Arthur's control and stops the vine from choking Mary Margaret.

Arthur is stunned but continues trying to force Merlin to kill Mary Margaret, pushing Merlin to the limit, but the distraction gives Hook time to free himself and come at Arthur. After a brief scuffle, Hook knocks the sword away from Arthur and keeps him from grabbing it. Arthur runs off and releases Zelena, who teleports both of them away. Emma thanks Hook and heals a cut on his neck from Excalibur. He says that now they have the sword, so they just need to light the spark, and then they can get the darkness out of Emma. Back at Granny's, Hook recounts the adventure to Henry, who is excited. David and Regina report back that Arthur has retreated far away and Emma is outside with the spark, trying to make it work. Regina comes out and she tells her that Rumplestiltskin's manifestation is playing with her, telling her she can't light it because she's not ready to give up the darkness since she is still lured by it, even though she knows that it's wrong. Regina grabs the dagger and commands Emma to tell her why she's afraid to give up the darkness. Emma says that she can't protect her family if she does. Regina says that's not the truth, that it's only "a wall," and uses the dagger to continue probing her, trying to get her to admit the truth. Hook, David, and Mary Margaret come up, and Hook snatches the dagger from Regina, thinking that she's worsening the situation, while Emma storms off with the Dagger and the spark. Regina responds by telling them that she wasn't being cruel; she was trying to help her find the truth, even it is painful.

Hook finds Emma and tells her that he's sorry that Regina used the Dagger on her, but Emma says that Regina was right and that with her help, she was finally able to uncover the truth. She shows Hook the ad for the house and says that she's afraid of the future. He asks if she's scared to move in with him and Emma tells him that "it’s everything." She says that she's afraid because she does want a future with him, and the minute the darkness is gone, that future begins. Hook says that's music to his pirate ears. He tells her not to be afraid of the future and kisses her. The Promethean Spark ignites, and Hook points out that now that Emma has overcome her fear, they are finally ready to reforge Excalibur.

Back at Granny's, Emma takes part of the Promethean Flame and ionizes it, before she thrusts both halves of Excalibur into the flame to reunite the blade. However, the cut from Excalibur that Hook received reappears, causing him to bleed and collapse. Emma catches holds him and tells him that she's not ready to let him go, but Hook tells her that it's okay and wants to see her reunite Excalibur before he dies. As Emma desperately searches for a way to save Hook, Merlin tells her that there's nothing she can do to heal a wound from Excalibur (which was forged to cut immortal ties), and Regina and Emma's parents tell her that Merlin's right. However, Emma yells that after how hard Regina pushed for her to save Robin, it was not fair for her to give up Hook, and says that Merlin was lying, that she could use her power to save him. Emma says that she could release Merlin from the fragment of Excalibur and tether Hook's life to it instead; but Merlin says that if she does, it could create another Dark One, which will multiply the Darkness so much that Emma will be unable to destroy it unless she pays "the steepest of prices." He also tells her that such an act will complete her fall into the darkness. However, Emma says that she won't let Hook go and uses her magic to take both of them to a field of Middlemist flowers.

In the field, Hook says that he doesn't want to become a Dark One, that he's weak, unlike Merlin and Emma, and that he'll succumb to the darkness again if she does that. Emma says that he won't, that she'll help him fight it together, and that she still wants a future with him. But Hook tells her not to, that their future is now, and that he's happy just to know that she has one, before going limp. Emma says that it's not enough for her. She holds him and cries, and then takes Excalibur and floods it with magic. In the diner, Merlin tells them it's too late, and tendrils of darkness emerge from him as he is released from Excalibur (the darkness was what bound Merlin to the fragment of Excalibur). The dark tendrils re-emerge from Excalibur and flow into Killian's heart, bathing him in a golden light. Then, Hook vanishes and his name appears on the blade of Excalibur. Then, a burst of dark magic erupts from the blade of Excalibur, turning Emma into her present-day appearance, with white hair and a dark appearance, signifying the completion of her journey into darkness. At the same time, a flood of dark energy pours into the entrance of the Vault of the Dark One, and reforms into a cloaked Killian.

=== In Storybrooke ===
In the woods, David, Hook and Robin are ready to confront Arthur at his tent, and they brought weapons along, just in case. Robin and Hook secure the area while David goes inside the tent. As Arthur greets David cordially, David demands to know why Arthur lied and tried to burn the Crimson Crown, and tells him about the message they received from Merlin, which detailed that only Nimue could destroy that Darkness. David demands to know who Nimue is and points his gun at Arthur. Arthur, however, decides to throw the threesome off with a table, then escapes into the wood with the three in pursuit. After Arthur trips, he sees Hook and kicks him down and draws his sword on him, but just before he can kill Hook, Emma suddenly shows up and uses the now-reunited Excalibur stop Arthur's attack, telling a stunned Arthur that the sword no longer controls anyone, before sending him flying into a tree. Hook thanks Emma, but Emma says that there's no need to. Hook apologizes for what he said on his ship, and when Emma asks if he meant that he didn't love her and that he refused to accept who she now was, he says that he still does and will always love her. When Emma asks Hook what he wants, he says that he wants to help her, and asks who Nimue is. She says that Nimue doesn't matter anymore, and that it will all be over tomorrow. Hook asks why she needs the sword. Emma walks away and Hook says he knows she has reasons for doing this, and Emma tells Hook that she does, and that she's doing all of this for him, before disappearing.

Arthur is in a cell in the town prison, and Hook wants to know who Nimue is and what he's hiding, but Arthur says that Emma took his memories so he doesn't know anything. David pries Hook away, saying that Arthur was right, he doesn't remember anything from the events in Camelot, and the now Arthur was "no longer important." Hook says Emma told them this was about him, but Regina says that Emma is manipulating him as all the Dark Ones do. Regina is convinced that Emma has fully succumbed to the darkness. Hook believes Emma hasn't fully caved to the darkness yet since she hasn't used the sword. But Regina thinks Emma still needs another ingredient for her spell. Hook is determined to find out what went on in Camelot, saying that the only way to help her is to find out what happened between him and Emma. Hook visits Gold at his shop, and Mr. Gold tells Belle to put down the crossbow since Hook wasn't Emma. Mr. Gold says he had some squid ink set aside, but the new Dark One took it. Hook says that Dark Ones are clever, being able to convince everyone that they've really changed when they haven't, and then asks what's going on inside Emma's head. He tells Gold what Emma said about her actions being about him. Gold says he recognizes the look on her face – regret. He says he became the Dark One to save his son. He adds that he convinced himself everything he did was for that, and that once he saved his son, he would atone for his sins, but things did not work out. He tells Hook to find out what Emma is trying to atone for. Hook says he can't find her, and Gold says that he will have to give her a reason to find him. Hook goes outside and calls for Emma and asks what happened between them and what she wants.

Hook goes calling for Emma and stands on a rooftop to get attention. He jumps off, and Emma uses magic to take him safely to the ground, before asking why he was so sure she'd save him. He says he was optimistic and then asks what happened between them in Camelot. He says he forgives her, but she says that she's the Dark One and she doesn't need forgiveness. Hook says there's nothing she's done could be as bad as what he's done. He shows her a ring that belonged to Barnaby, and whom he killed in front of his wife. He says that every ring he wears is a sad story. She shows him the ring he gave her to keep safe, and he says it was the saddest story of all. It belonged to a man better than him, his brother Liam. She tries to give it back but he tells her to keep it. He says he wore rings as trophies and now they're just reminders. When Emma asks if Hook wants to know the truth, no matter how terrible, Hook says he loves her no matter what. Emma says she needs to show him something. She takes him to her house and she points him to a telescope. He looks and sees the sea and a full moon over the waves. She says he told her the ocean calmed him and he says it's a nice home she picked, but Emma says that he picked it, not her. He looks at the newspaper and recognized his handwriting on it. She says he told her this was their future and she says everything she did was to keep that future alive. He asks again for the truth and she says they're almost there and kisses him. She says she can't tell him everything because he would try and stop her. After the kiss, Hook gets groggy and asks what she's doing, before passing out.

At the rehabilitation cell, Zelena reads "Hansel and Gretel" to her unborn child, before going into pain, screaming and banging on the door. Regina and Robin show up and they look at her pregnant body, which has accelerated by seven months (from two months), a result of Emma's dark magic. Zelena is rushed to the hospital and says that Emma did this with her onion rings. Dr. Whale is there and Zelena says tells him to get her "angry baby" out, and Whale reminds her about the last baby he delivered, which she tried to steal. He then mocks her, telling her that she must have realized that having a baby was so much more fun than stealing one. Regina asks why his hair is blonde and spiked, with Dr. Whale replying that since Emma changed her hairstyle, he thought he could do the same as well. As Dr. Whale continues to joke about Zelena, Regina mutters that they "really need a new doctor in this town." Belle and Mary Margaret rush in and tell them that Emma is coming for the baby and that the only thing she needs other than Excalibur to snuff out the light is the cries of a newborn child. Zelena begs Regina to take off the cuff so she can defend herself and her baby, but Regina says no. Zelena immediately delivers a baby girl, as Regina and Mary Margaret wait in the hall. Mary asks if Regina is ready to meet her new family, but she says she doesn't know. As Robin hold the newborn, Emma appears, throwing Whale against the wall yet again. Robin and Regina prepare to fight her, but Emma reveals that she wants Zelena instead, and disappears with her.

Zelena and Hook are both chained to the wall in Emma's basement, as Zelena thinks Emma is preparing a spell to take her magic. Emma says she's giving her dark magic to Zelena. Hook asks her why she kept it a secret, and she says that she did this because she knew he would want to stop her. She says the dark magic must be put into a vessel, and then Emma will cut her down. Emma says that's why she needed the baby out. She reminds him that Zelena killed Marian and Neal, but Hook says that it's still "cold-blooded murder." Hook says Merlin must have a better solution, but she says that he can't help them anymore. Hook asks what happened to Merlin, and he asks her again why she's really doing this. Mary asks David and Regina how Emma can use Zelena to end dark magic, but they can't figure it out. Regina says no one hurts her sister except for her and tells them she's going to show Emma what dark magic is really like. Mary Margaret and David argue with Regina over going to war with Emma. Regina says Emma gave her the dagger because they knew she was the only one who could act despite her feelings. Emma comes out and says when she's done with Zelena, they will all be better off. Regina says that this is not right, but Emma says she knows Regina will be happier when Zelena is gone. Emma uses Excalibur to freeze them while putting up a magic barrier around the house.

In the basement, while Hook contemplates an escape, Zelena says that her anti-magic cuff is the real problem. Hook says he has magic in his hook but says that the last time he helped her, she betrayed him. She says that even though he doesn't know if he can trust her, he has no choice now. He slips off the cuff and she gets rid of her shackles, and puts herself into a fresh outfit, before coming over to Hook and undoing his shackles. Zelena tells Hook they have to sneak out the back, but Hook says he's not going. When Zelena questions why, Hook says he needs to stop Emma, and Zelena bids him goodbye. Hook searches Emma's house and takes a painting off the wall, but then Emma comes in, saying that she was trying to help Hook. Hook finds the squid ink on the back of the painting and splashes her with it, saying that she's a villain now, like Regina said. He says she has to tell him what happened in Camelot, but Emma says that he can't make her. Zelena returns and says that she couldn't leave without making the Dark One pay. Zelena stabs Hook in the chest, but he doesn't bleed or suffer any wounds, and he demands to know what's happening. She says she found a Dreamcatcher outside, which can explain what happened. Emma whispers to him not to trust her and that she can explain everything. Hook tells Zelena to do it and she shows him. The Dreamcatcher shows Hook his memories in Camelot, before showing him the events involving his current situation. It turns out that Hook was fatally wounded by Excalibur, and in order to save him, Emma tethered his life to Excalibur, which turned him into another Dark One. Emma tells him that she's sorry and says she had no choice. Hook says there must be another explanation. Zelena hands Hook the re-united Excalibur and she removes a glamour spell, and shows him that his name is on the bottom part of the sword while Emma's name is on the dagger end, gloating about them being "the Dark Ones." Emma says she wanted to make up for this, and says that her plan was the only way to get rid of the darkness in both of them. She says all she did was to try to save him, but Hook is enraged, saying, "So much for our future, Swan." Zelena asks if he's ready to find out what else happened in Camelot and he says yes, much to Emma's dismay. But Hook tells Zelena that first, they have to take care of Emma.

== Reception ==
The episode received positive reviews from critics

Andrea Towers of Entertainment Weekly notes in her assessment of the review, "While the two back-to-back episodes didn’t make too much sense meshed together, we still learned a lot of important things."

In a review from Rickey.org, Nick Roman said, "I liked that the script had enough trust in its audience to allow them to decide for themselves whether or not it was the right thing to do."

Amy Ratcliffe of IGN said of the episode, "The first installment of tonight's two-part yet separate Once Upon a Time episodes addressed nearly all the questions about the whys and hows of Emma's decision. Hook was an obvious choice, but the part about him also becoming a Dark One was an unexpected move and a smart way to twist the story. It was weird to follow the big reveal with a barely related adventure starring Merida though." Ratcliffe gave the episode an 8.5 rating out of 10.

Gwen Ihnat of The A.V. Club gave the episode an excellent review, giving it an A. In her recap, she gave the performances high marks: "Fortunately, “Birth” was magnificent enough to almost make up for all of that. We finally learn Emma's secret plan, and it's amazing: She had to turn Hook into another Dark One to save his life. In all the likely speculative scenarios, I sincerely doubt anyone saw that coming. So sure, Emma's plan is a bit dastardly now: To have Zelena absorb all of the dark magic, then kill her, but hey, she's the (a) Dark One! Of course her plan has to be a bit menacing."

Christine Orlando of TV Fanatic gave the episode a 4.5 out of 5 stars.
