= Kelly Macdonald =

Scottish actress (born 1976)

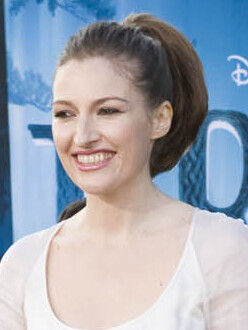
- Macdonald at the 2012 premiere of Brave
- Born: 23 February 1976 (age 50); Glasgow, Scotland
- Occupation: Actress
- Years active: 1996–present
- Spouse: Dougie Payne (m. 2003; sep. 2017)
- Children: 2

Kelly Macdonald (born 23 February 1976) is a Scottish actress. Known for her performances on film and television, she has received various accolades including a BAFTA Award, a Primetime Emmy Award, and four Screen Actors Guild Awards.

Macdonald made her film debut in Danny Boyle's Trainspotting (1996). She was nominated for the BAFTA Award for Best Actress in a Supporting Role for her role in the Coen brothers film No Country for Old Men (2007). During her career, she has taken roles in Elizabeth (1998), Gosford Park (2001), Intermission (2003), Nanny McPhee (2005), Harry Potter and the Deathly Hallows – Part 2 (2011), Anna Karenina (2012), T2 Trainspotting (2017), and Operation Mincemeat (2021). She voiced Princess Merida in the Disney Pixar animated film Brave (2012).

On television, she won Primetime Emmy Award for Outstanding Supporting Actress in a Miniseries or a Movie for her role in the BBC One film The Girl in the Cafe (2005). She was further Emmy-nominated for her portrayal of Margaret Thompson in the HBO period crime drama series Boardwalk Empire (2010–2014). She also acted in Black Mirror's Hated in the Nation (2016), the limited series Giri/Haji (2019), the BBC police procedural Line of Duty (2021) and the HBO superhero series Lanterns (2026).

== Early life ==
Kelly Macdonald was born on 23 February 1976 in Glasgow, Scotland, and grew up in nearby Neilston, Renfrewshire. She attended Eastwood High School from 1989 to 1993.

== Career ==
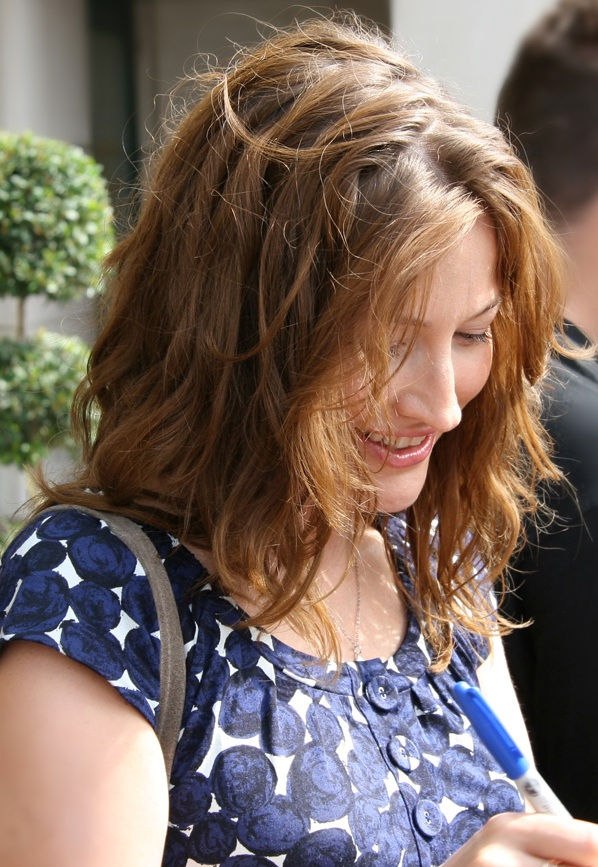
Macdonald at the 2007 Toronto International Film Festival

Macdonald's career began while she was working as a barmaid in Glasgow. She saw a leaflet advertising an open casting session for Trainspotting and decided to audition, winning the part of Diane, the underage love interest to Ewan McGregor's Renton. Other roles include Mary O'Neary in Two Family House, and an actress playing Peter Pan in Finding Neverland. She had major roles in Robert Altman's British period piece Gosford Park, where she played an aristocrat's maid, and in Intermission (2003), as Deirdre.

On radio she portrayed Mary in the 1999 BBC radio drama Lifehouse, based on Pete Townshend's abandoned rock opera, some of the songs for which were released on The Who's album Who's Next. On television, her highest profile roles have been in two BBC dramas, the Paul Abbott serial State of Play (2003), and the one-off Richard Curtis piece The Girl in the Café (2005). Both of these were directed by David Yates, and both also starred Bill Nighy. For her performance in The Girl in the Café, she was nominated for the Golden Globe Award for Best Actress – Miniseries or Television Film in 2006, and won the Primetime Emmy Award for Outstanding Supporting Actress in a Miniseries or a Movie.

Macdonald had a supporting role in the Coen brothers' Academy Award-winning film No Country for Old Men (2007), for which she was nominated for a BAFTA Award for Best Actress in a Supporting Role. It was reported that she had to fight her agent to be considered for the role, but Macdonald later denied the story.

Other films where she had supporting roles include Choke (2008), adapted by Clark Gregg from the 2001 Chuck Palahniuk novel, as Paige Marshall; In the Electric Mist (2009) (based on James Lee Burke's In the Electric Mist with Confederate Dead (1993), as Kelly Drummond, alongside Tommy Lee Jones and John Goodman; and Skellig (2009), as Louise. She played the lead in The Merry Gentleman (2008).

In 2011 she played the "Grey Lady" (revealed to be Helena Ravenclaw) in Harry Potter and the Deathly Hallows – Part 2, the final instalment of the Harry Potter film franchise. She replaced Nina Young, who originally played the role. In 2012, she provided the voice of Merida, the heroine of the Disney/Pixar film Brave, and played Dolly in Anna Karenina. She starred in the romantic comedy film The Decoy Bride, which was released in 2012.

From 2010 until its ending in 2014, she starred in the HBO crime drama Boardwalk Empire as Margaret Thompson, the wife of Prohibition-era Atlantic City crime boss Nucky Thompson (Steve Buscemi). She appeared in all five seasons of the series. In 2011, she and the rest of the show's cast were awarded the Screen Actors Guild Award for Outstanding Performance by an Ensemble in a Drama Series.

In 2016 she starred in Ricky Gervais' Special Correspondents as Claire Maddox, and Swallows and Amazons as Mrs. Walker. In 2016, she played the lead role in "Hated in the Nation", an episode of the anthology series Black Mirror for which she received critical acclaim. On 3 November 2016 Macdonald was featured in the trailer for Danny Boyle's T2 Trainspotting confirming she would reprise her role as Diane from the original film, which she did. In 2017, she co-starred opposite Benedict Cumberbatch in the BBC film The Child in Time. Macdonald played the guest lead in the sixth series of the BBC's police drama Line of Duty.

In 2025 Macdonald appeared as a therapist in the Netflix thriller Dept. Q. Her current role is as a sheriff in the HBO series Lanterns.

== Personal life ==
In August 2003 Macdonald married musician Dougie Payne, bassist of the band Travis. They have two sons. The couple moved back to their hometown of Glasgow in 2014 after living in London and New York City. They separated in 2017.

== Filmography ==
=== Film ===
Year	Title	Role	Notes
1996	Trainspotting	Diane Coulston	Film debut
1996	Dancing, Some Days	Sharon	Short film
1996	Stella Does Tricks	Stella McGuire	
1997	Dead Eye Dick	Wendy	Short film
1998	Cousin Bette	Hortense Hulot	
1998	Elizabeth	Isabel Knollys	
1999	Splendor	Mike	
1999	Entropy	Pia	
1999	The Loss of Sexual Innocence	Susan	
1999	My Life So Far	Elspeth Pettigrew	
1999	Tube Tales	Emma	Segment: "Mr. Cool"
2000	Two Family House	Mary O'Neary	
2000	House!	Linda	
2000	Some Voices	Laura	
2001	Strictly Sinatra	Irene	
2001	Gosford Park	Mary Maceachran	
2003	Intermission	Deirdre	
2004	Finding Neverland	Peter Pan	
2005	The Hitchhiker's Guide to the Galaxy	Reporter Jin Jenz	
2005	All the Invisible Children	Jonathan's wife	Segment: "Jonathan"
2005	Nanny McPhee	Evangeline	
2005	Lassie	Jeanie	
2005	A Cock and Bull Story	Jenny	
2007	No Country for Old Men	Carla Jean Moss	
2008	The Merry Gentleman	Kate Frazier	
2008	Choke	Paige Marshall	
2009	In the Electric Mist	Kelly Drummond	
2011	The Decoy Bride	Katie Nic Aodh	
2011	Harry Potter and the Deathly Hallows – Part 2	Helena Ravenclaw	
2012	Brave	Princess Merida	Voice
2012	Anna Karenina	Dolly Oblonskaya	
2016	Special Correspondents	Claire Maddox	
2016	Swallows and Amazons	Mrs. Walker	
2016	The Journey Is the Destination	Duff	
2017	T2 Trainspotting	Diane Coulston	
2017	Goodbye Christopher Robin	Olive	
2018	Puzzle	Agnes	
2018	Ralph Breaks the Internet	Princess Merida	Voice
2018	Holmes & Watson	Mrs. Hudson	
2019	Dirt Music	Georgie Jutland	
2021	Operation Mincemeat	Jean Leslie	
2022	I Came By	Lizzie Nealey	
2022	Typist Artist Pirate King	Sandra	
2024	The Radleys	Helen Radley	

=== Television ===
Year	Title	Role	Notes
1996	Flowers of the Forest	Amy Ogilvie	Television film
2003	Brush with Fate	Aletta Pieters	Television film
2003	State of Play	Della Smith	6 episodes
2005	Alias	Kiera MacLaine/Meghan Keene	Episode: "Ice"
2005	The Girl in the Café	Gina	Television film
2009	Skellig	Louise/Mum	Television film
2010–2014	Boardwalk Empire	Margaret Thompson	45 episodes
2016	Black Mirror	DCI Karin Parke	Episode: "Hated in the Nation"
2017	The Child in Time	Julie	Television film
2019	The Victim	Anna Dean	Television miniseries
2019	Giri/Haji	DC Sarah Weitzmann	Main role
2019	Urban Myths	Princess Margaret	Episode: "Mick and Margaret"
2020	Truth Seekers	Jojo74	2 episodes
2021	Line of Duty	DCI Joanne Davidson	Main role, Series 6
2022	Ten Percent	Herself	Episode #1.1
2024	Star Wars: Skeleton Crew	Pokkit	2 episodes
2024	Somebody Feed Phil	Herself	Episode: "Scotland"
2025	Dept. Q	Dr Rachel Irving	Main role
2026	Lanterns	Sheriff Kerry Kane	

=== Video games ===
Year	Title	Role	Notes
2012	Brave	Merida	Voice

== Awards and nominations ==
Year	Nominated work	Award	Category	Result
1997	Trainspotting	BAFTA Scotland Awards	Best Film Actress	Nominated
2000	Two Family House	Independent Spirit Awards	Best Female Lead	Nominated
2002	Gosford Park	Online Film Critics Society	Best Cast	Won
2002	Gosford Park	Phoenix Film Critics Society	Best Acting Ensemble	Nominated
2002	Gosford Park	Satellite Awards	Best Cast – Motion Picture	Won
2002	Gosford Park	Screen Actors Guild Awards	Outstanding Performance by a Cast in a Motion Picture	Won
2002	Gosford Park	Critics' Choice Movie Awards	Best Acting Ensemble	Nominated
2002	Gosford Park	Florida Film Critics Circle	Best Ensemble Cast	Won
2003	Gosford Park	Empire Awards	Best British Actress	Nominated
2006	The Girl in the Café	Primetime Emmy Awards	Outstanding Supporting Actress in a Miniseries or a Movie	Won
2006	The Girl in the Café	Golden Globe Awards	Best Actress in a Miniseries or Television Film	Nominated
2008	Choke	Sundance Film Festival	Special Jury Prize for Best Dramatic Ensemble Cast	Won
2008	No Country for Old Men	Online Film Critics Society	Best Supporting Actress	Nominated
2008	No Country for Old Men	British Academy Film Awards	Best Actress in a Supporting Role	Nominated
2008	No Country for Old Men	London Film Critics' Circle	Supporting Actress of the Year	Won
2008	No Country for Old Men	Screen Actors Guild Awards	Outstanding Performance by a Cast in a Motion Picture	Won
2011	Boardwalk Empire	Golden Globe Awards	Best Supporting Actress – Series, Miniseries or Television Film	Nominated
2011	Boardwalk Empire	Screen Actors Guild Awards	Outstanding Performance by an Ensemble in a Drama Series	Won
2011	Boardwalk Empire	Critics' Choice Television Awards	Best Supporting Actress in a Drama Series	Nominated
2011	Boardwalk Empire	Primetime Emmy Awards	Outstanding Supporting Actress in a Drama Series	Nominated
2012	Boardwalk Empire	Golden Globe Awards	Best Supporting Actress – Series, Miniseries or Television Film	Nominated
2012	Boardwalk Empire	Screen Actors Guild Awards	Outstanding Performance by an Ensemble in a Drama Series	Won
2012	Boardwalk Empire	Critics' Choice Television Awards	Best Supporting Actress in a Drama Series	Nominated
2012	Brave	Annie Awards	Outstanding Voice Acting in a Feature Production	Nominated
2017	Goodbye Christopher Robin	British Independent Film Awards	Best Supporting Actress	Nominated
2019	The Victim	British Academy Scotland Awards	Best Actress Television	Won
2021	Line of Duty	British Academy Scotland Awards	Best Actress Television	Nominated
2021	Line of Duty	British Academy Scotland Awards	Audience Award	Nominated

== Honours ==
Eastwood High School, where she was a pupil, has a drama studio and theatre named in her honour.
