= The Big C (TV series) =

American comedy drama TV series (2010–2013)

- Genre: Comedy drama
- Created by: Darlene Hunt
- Showrunner: Jenny Bicks
- Starring: Laura Linney; Oliver Platt; John Benjamin Hickey; Gabriel Basso; Gabourey Sidibe; Phyllis Somerville
- Opening theme: "Game Called Life" by Leftover Cuties
- Composers: Marcelo Zarvos; Jesse Voccia
- Country of origin: United States
- Original language: English
- No. of seasons: 4
- No. of episodes: 40 (list of episodes)

Production
- Executive producers: Darlene Hunt; Laura Linney; Jenny Bicks; Neal H. Moritz; Vivian Cannon; Mark J. Kunerth; Michael Engler
- Producers: Cara DiPaolo; Lou Fusaro (pilot only); Melanie Marnich
- Production locations: Minneapolis–Saint Paul (setting); Stamford, Connecticut (actual filming location)
- Running time: 28 minutes (season 1–3); 56 minutes (season 4)
- Production companies: Perkins Street Productions; Farm Kid Films; Original Film; Sony Pictures Television; Showtime Networks

Original release
- Network: Showtime
- Release: August 16, 2010 – May 20, 2013

The Big C is an American comedy drama television series which premiered on August 16, 2010, on Showtime. It drew the largest audience for a Showtime original series premiere. Season 2 premiered on June 27, 2011. Season 3 premiered on April 8, 2012. On July 31, 2012, The Big C was renewed for a fourth and final season, named "Hereafter", which premiered on Monday, April 29, 2013, and concluded on May 20, 2013.

== Plot ==
Season	Episodes	Originally aired	
Season	Episodes	First aired	Last aired
1	13	August 16, 2010	November 15, 2010
2	13	June 27, 2011	September 26, 2011
3	10	April 8, 2012	June 17, 2012
4	13	April 29, 2013	May 20, 2013

Cathy Jamison (Laura Linney), a high school teacher in Minneapolis, is diagnosed with melanoma. She withholds the diagnosis from her husband Paul (Oliver Platt), homeless brother Sean (John Benjamin Hickey), and son Adam (Gabriel Basso). This news, coinciding with the beginning of summer, inspires Cathy to get a pool built in her backyard. Her cranky neighbor Marlene (Phyllis Somerville) opposes the project but ultimately begins to bond with Cathy and becomes the first person to learn about her cancer. Cathy also begins exhibiting increasingly odd behavior in reaction to her cancer, such as emptying out her retirement fund and burning the couch she's always hated. Meanwhile, Paul and Cathy remain separated over an incident that occurred prior to the start of the series. Cathy begins an extramarital affair with a painter at the high school (Idris Elba). Paul witnesses the two of them together and asks for a divorce; Cathy, in turn, ends the tryst and informs Paul that she has cancer. Paul begins to understand what Cathy's been going through, moves back in and pledges to assist her with her disease. Marlene, who has been succumbing to Alzheimer's, dies by suicide after inadvertently putting Adam in harm's way. Her death inspires Cathy to begin seeking treatment, something she was initially opposed to.

In the fall, Cathy begins a clinical trial run by the highly renowned Dr. Atticus Sherman (Alan Alda). By this point, Cathy's friends and family are all aware of her diagnosis and provide her with support; financially, however, the Jamisons are struggling to foot the bill for Cathy's treatment. After Paul is fired from his job, he accepts a demeaning position at an electronics store solely for the insurance benefits. Meanwhile, Cathy befriends Lee (Hugh Dancy), a fellow patient in Dr. Sherman's trial. The two become close over their shared experience and Lee becomes a close friend of the Jamisons. Cathy begins experiencing symptoms of the drugs in the clinical trial, a sign that the treatment is working; Lee does not fare as well and announces that he plans on quitting treatment altogether. Lee dies shortly after and Cathy plans on running the Minneapolis New Year's Eve marathon in his honor. Meanwhile, the stress of providing for the family leads Paul to become increasingly reliant on cocaine. With insurance bills mounting, Paul crashes the agency's holiday party and has a heart attack. Although he is pronounced dead for several minutes, he ultimately survives.

One month later, Paul is recovering from his heart attack and begins chronicling his near-death experience in a blog. Cathy's tumors have shrunk immensely as a result of the clinical trial and she enters remission. Seeking direction in the wake of their new leases on life, Cathy and Paul attend a retreat by a self-help guru named Joy Kleinman (Susan Sarandon). Cathy, although initially resistant to Joy's teachings, comes to the realization that she wants another child. Joy sees potential in Paul's blog and invites him to join her on stage; Paul subsequently becomes a popular speaker. Meanwhile, Cathy and Paul speak to a couple regarding the possibility of the Jamisons adopting their yet-born child. This is ultimately a scam and becomes a point of contention between Cathy, who really wanted the child, and Paul, who is more concerned with his newfound popularity. Suspecting that Joy is having an affair with Paul, Cathy confronts her but Joy is hit by a bus in a freak accident. Paul replaces Joy at a speaking engagement in Puerto Rico over Easter and becomes the successor to her self-help empire. Cathy is informed that her tumors are growing and that she will probably die within a year. While scuba diving in Puerto Rico, Cathy experiences a vivid hallucination caused by the growing tumors and requires brain surgery.

Cathy spends the next several months undergoing chemotherapy but quits when she realizes that it is ultimately pointless. Her relationship with Paul is cordial although she suspects that he's waiting for her to die to move on; Cathy in turn encourages him to begin dating other women so she can approve of who he may remarry. Per the advice of a counselor, Cathy sets a goal that she wants to see Adam graduate high school before she dies, although this appears unlikely considering he's only starting junior year. When Cathy begins experiencing memory loss, she goes to live in hospice. This upsets the whole family and Paul and Adam fall apart in her absence. The following spring, Cathy's four months of insurance coverage expires and she returns home, albeit bedridden. Adam, fulfilling one of Cathy's wishes, reveals that he's secretly taken an entire year's worth of school online and has received his high school diploma. Paul, having gone out to buy Cathy's flowers, returns home to find that she's dead. In the very last scene, Cathy is seen in a serene swimming pool with Marlene and Thomas, Marlene's dog.

== Cast ==
Actor	Character	Seasons			
Actor	Character	1	2	3	4
Laura Linney	Cathy Jamison	Main	Main	Main	Main
Oliver Platt	Paul Jamison	Main	Main	Main	Main
John Benjamin Hickey	Sean Tolkey	Main	Main	Main	Main
Gabriel Basso	Adam Jamison	Main	Main	Main	Main
Phyllis Somerville	Marlene	Main	Recurring	Recurring	Recurring
Gabourey Sidibe	Andrea Jackson	Recurring	Recurring	Main	Main

=== Main cast ===
- Laura Linney as Cathy Jamison. Cathy is a Minneapolis–Saint Paul high school teacher who, at the start of the series, has been recently diagnosed with terminal (stage IV) melanoma. Reluctant to burden her family and friends with the news, she keeps it a secret for months. She does reveal her illness to elderly neighbor Marlene (who later dies by suicide), after Marlene figures it out since her dog, Thomas, who had often been hanging around Cathy, can sniff out cancer. Her behavior dramatically changes as she begins to make reckless choices in the face of oncoming death. These include kicking her husband out of the house, spending money on an expensive car, and having an affair. She befriends Andrea, a mouthy student in her summer English class. Desperate to make sure her teenage son is on the right path before she dies, she unintentionally drives a rift between them. She ends her affair when it is exposed, and allows her husband to move back in after finally revealing to him that she is sick. She gives Marlene's house, which Marlene left to Cathy in her will, to her brother Sean. She decides to undergo a treatment with great risks because she wants to live. Although initial results are promising, the treatment proves unsuccessful. In season four, Cathy plans for the inevitability of her imminent death.
- Oliver Platt as Paul Jamison, Cathy's husband. Paul has a somewhat childlike approach to life, and Cathy kicks him out of the house because she is fed up of looking after him. He doesn't really understand the situation but appeases her in the hopes that their marriage can be repaired. While separated, he has a sexual encounter with another woman; this is ultimately forgiven in the face of Cathy's affair. After Cathy reveals her cancer to him, he moves back in and becomes overly attentive and doting. At the end of the second-season finale episode, Paul appears to Cathy as a hallucination at the end of the marathon she runs and then a cut scene shows him being worked on by an EMS team after ingesting cocaine earlier in the day. In season three, Paul begins to write a blog about his life and Cathy's cancer. They attend a motivational workshop led by Joy Kleinman, who becomes Paul's mentor. After Joy dies by getting hit by a bus, Paul takes over her motivational self-help empire, under his tag phrase "flip that switch".
- John Benjamin Hickey as Sean Tolkey, Cathy's brother. Sean is an eccentric, homeless, anti-establishment environmentalist. He is frequently dirty and eats out of garbage cans. Though having a somewhat distant relationship, Cathy begins making a concerted effort to get closer to him after she is diagnosed with cancer. He starts a relationship with Cathy's college friend Rebecca, which ends badly. At one point Cathy reveals her illness to him and he has an emotional breakdown; she reneges, claiming she made it up to get a reaction. In the season one finale, Rebecca reveals to Sean that she is pregnant. At the beginning of season two, Sean and Rebecca have moved into Marlene's house. It's revealed that Sean has bipolar disorder but has refused to treat it in the past. He begins taking medications in order to become more stable for his unborn child, but then goes off the medications when Rebecca miscarries. After Rebecca leaves Sean, he has an emotional downward spiral that causes him to lash out against Cathy and other family members. He comes home at the end of second season and tells Cathy that he was working for a traveling circus. In the third season, Sean gets a job as a janitor at Adam's school. After finally getting a landline, he starts receiving calls for "Willy Wanker", discovering that the last person who had the phone number was a gay phone sex operator. Sean starts his own phone sex operation as a way to make extra money, and ends up connecting with a client named Tim. He then starts a relationship with him and his wife Giselle, but they break it off when Sean's presence begins to negatively affect their marriage. Wanting to do something meaningful and life-affirming in light of what is happening to Cathy, he decides to donate a kidney to an unknown recipient. He and that recipient, Ray, decide to meet days before the surgery. In the simple act of Ray offering Sean a gift of an expensive Rolex watch in gratitude of what he's doing, Sean can see that Ray is everything he abhors in life. Although Sean decides to go through with the donation on Cathy's urging, he also decides because of Ray that he will return to being homeless again.
- Gabriel Basso as Adam Jamison, Cathy and Paul's son, who attends the same school where Cathy teaches. A typical teenager, he resists his mother's sudden increase in attention and affection. He strikes an unsteady friendship with schoolmate Andrea, but it falls apart after he balks when it is insinuated by others that they are sexually intimate. After getting in trouble, he is punished by being forced to do house chores for Marlene. He is the first to realize Marlene has Alzheimer's disease. In season one episode "Everything that Rises Must Converge", Marlene, not recognizing Adam, pulls a gun on him and chases him out of her home. Adam does not know about his mother's cancer until the season one finale. While his mother is in the hospital receiving treatment, he discovers a key to a storage locker that is filled with hundreds of gifts for his future birthdays, holidays and major life events. He realizes his mother is not going to live very long and finally reacts emotionally. At the beginning of season two, Adam feels frustrated with all the attention he's been getting at school due to Cathy's illness. He wants to pursue a sexual relationship with his girlfriend Mia, who he started dating at the end of season one, but she wants to take things slow. He then sleeps with classmate Emily, but refuses to take any responsibility for his actions. While his parents are away, Adam has sex with a hooker / dominatrix in their bedroom, and then has Uncle Sean help get rid of her. In the episode "The Little C", it is revealed that Adam contracted crabs from his encounter with the hooker, and accidentally exposed Cathy and Paul. He confesses this to them, and Cathy tells Mia thinking Adam got it from her. Mia promptly dumps him, and refuses to give him any sympathy due to his mother's illness. He then begins chatting with a girl named Poppy through an online cancer support group. When they finally meet, Adam discovers that Poppy is actually a thirty-something year old woman. Despite this, they bond over their immature sense of humor and their parents' diseases. Before the family is supposed to go to Italy for Christmas, Adam discovers that Poppy's father has actually been dead for several years. He confronts Poppy, but she explains that once he loses his mom, he will feel like a part of him is missing. In the third season, Adam has joined a prayer group at school, where he meets the extremely religious Jesse, who becomes his girlfriend. In season four, Adam is starting grade 11. One of Cathy's pipe dreams is to see him graduate from high school before she dies. He, however, is having troubles and is failing one of his classes, Chemistry. With the help of a tutor that Cathy hires, Adam is able to pass his Chemistry exam and class. As it becomes clear to Adam that Cathy will most likely die while he is in Grade 11, Adam, without telling anyone in his family, decides to accelerate the completion of his degree requirements online, his frequent absences from the house which he lies to his family that he is hanging out with friends while he is really going to school to write exams. In a small, informal and previously unannounced ceremony at the Jamison home, Adam's principal, Connie Schuler, is able to hand a cap and gowned Adam his high school diploma in front of Cathy and the rest of the family.
- Gabourey Sidibe as Andrea Jackson (Seasons 3 and 4, recurring previously), a mouthy and combative student in Cathy's class. Cathy takes an interest in her and offers her a cash reward for losing weight. She is the first person to realize Cathy is having an affair. She lies to Cathy about her upbringing and economic status, claiming her mother is a drug addict and they live in poverty. Cathy visits their home to discover she lives in a lovely upper-middle-class home with two educated, caring parents. In the second season, Andrea, on Cathy's invitation, comes to live with Cathy and her family due to her parents moving away to Africa for missionary work. She starts dating Paul's co-worker Myk, and becomes engaged to him, but then Paul reveals that Myk is in the country illegally, and might be only marrying her for a green card. Heartbroken, Andrea spends her winter break in Africa and connects with her heritage, after which she renames herself Ababu. In season four, she is a student at a local college in the fashion design program, with Isaac Mizrahi a guest professor for the year. Her school year does not start off well, she was not getting along with her dorm roommate, and losing the sparkle in her design work largely because of her thoughts of Cathy's imminent death. Mizrahi is able to get Andrea back on track, and offers her an internship in New York at the end of the academic year. She initially decides not to accept it, knowing that Cathy will die when she will be in New York, but Cathy convinces her to change her mind and accept it.
- Phyllis Somerville as Marlene (Season 1, recurring afterward), Cathy's elderly neighbor and friend. Somewhat crotchety, Marlene lost her husband to cancer many years earlier. She has two daughters, from whom she is estranged. Although she finds Cathy annoying at first, the two quickly become friends, eventually becoming close to the whole family. Marlene is the first person to know Cathy's secret. She figures it out after her dog, a Basset Hound named Thomas, stalks Cathy, because dogs can supposedly "smell" cancer. Marlene starts to exhibit episodes of memory loss, often suddenly forgetting where she is and who people are. She finally admits to Cathy that she has Alzheimer's. She pulls a gun on Adam, not recognizing who he is, and her horror of what she might do as she continues to deteriorate makes her decide to kill herself. At the beginning of the second season, she appears to Cathy during hallucinations. Marlene and Thomas, who dies at the beginning of season four, are waiting on the other side in Cathy's swimming pool when Cathy dies.

=== Recurring cast ===
- Reid Scott as Dr. Todd Mauer (Seasons 1 and 2), Cathy's oncologist and friend. Compassionate and concerned, he goes beyond the doctor/patient relationship by going on several personal outings with Cathy. He begins to become her confidante as she tells him all of the secrets she cannot tell her family. He allows her to accompany him while house shopping for him and his girlfriend. He reluctantly accompanies Cathy to Canada for an alternative therapy treatment, and while there reveals that he is "confused" and has feelings for her.
- Cynthia Nixon as Rebecca (Seasons 1 and 2), Cathy's college roommate and long-time friend. She resurfaces at Cathy's birthday party after a long absence. When she begins a sexual relationship with Sean, Cathy reveals that she has always found Rebecca to be selfish and a bad friend, which serves as a wake-up call and leads to the end of the romance. She becomes pregnant with Sean's child. This news leads to him telling her that he wants to raise the child together. She later moves in with Sean and they fall in love, becoming engaged; however, when Rebecca miscarries their child, Sean discontinues his medication, giving Rebecca no choice but to leave him.
- Nadia Dajani as Tina (Seasons 1 and 2), who went to high school with Cathy and Paul and was then known as "Rugby Slut". Always attending the local rugby games, and not saying die to her youth, she starts an affair with Paul (Paulie) after Cathy kicks him out. Cathy discovers their affair when she comes to offer Paul an olive branch and sees Tina leaving with her thong.
- Idris Elba as Lenny (Season 1), a painter at Cathy's school. They have a brief affair but Cathy ends it as she re-examines her feelings for Paul.
- Myra Lucretia Taylor (Season 1) as Sheila, moderator of a discussion group.
- Alexandra Socha as Mia (Seasons 1 and 2), Adam's classmate and first serious girlfriend. She and Adam break up after she discovers that Adam had sex with someone else. She finds out about Adam's indiscretion when Cathy confronts her after he brings pubic lice aka crabs into the house, Cathy believing Adam having gotten them from having sex with Mia. She eventually forgives him leading to them getting back together for a short time.
- Brian Cox (Season 1) and Brian Dennehy (Season 4) as Donald Tolkey, Cathy and Sean's father, with whom they both have an estranged relationship. Despite that estrangement, Cathy feels the need to see him before she dies.
- Alan Alda as Dr. Atticus Sherman (Seasons 2–4), an oncologist leading a clinical trial. Cathy is first enthralled by the notion of Dr. Sherman and his work as possibly saving her life, but she changes her mind about him after he initially refuses her entry into the trial and she sees that his bedside manner is clinical rather than humanistic. Dr. Sherman eventually does admit Cathy into the trial, which initially does show promising results, but which ultimately does not cure Cathy. Cathy eventually learns that he too is suffering from advanced stage cancer of the colon when she catches him at the cancer clinic as a patient. He dies before Cathy of his cancer.
- Hugh Dancy as Lee Fallon (Season 2), a fellow patient in Dr. Sherman's clinical trial. Cathy thinks Lee is inappropriately interested in her until he comes out as gay to her. She and Lee find comfort in each other due to their cancer, and become "clinical trial" buddies. Lee's acupuncturist believes they are soul mates, as Cathy's excessively high blood pressure immediately drops once Lee enters the room. However, their relationship becomes strained when the treatment begins to work for Cathy and not Lee. As she encourages him to fight, he refuses. Ultimately Lee dies from his cancer, leaving Cathy devastated. She does however believe that the greatest gift he gave her was asking her to be there when he died, and she seeing that he died in peace.
- Parker Posey as Poppy Kowalski (Season 2), who Adam meets in a children of cancer victims online support group. In Poppy's online persona, Adam believes her to be the same age as him, but upon their eventual face-to-face meeting, he finds out that she is in her thirties. Adam later finds out that Poppy had been lying in that her cancer-stricken father is no longer alive, he having died several years earlier, leading to him believing that she has mental issues.
- Emily Kinney as Emily (Season 2), a classmate of Adam's who is his first sexual partner after his girlfriend at the time, Mia, tells him that she isn't yet ready to have sex.
- Boyd Holbrook as Mykail (Season 2), Paul's Ukrainian immigrant co-worker at the electronics store. Paul finds out that Mykail is stealing and selling merchandise from the store on the sly, the scheme which Paul enters into briefly with him. Mykail enters into a relationship with Andrea, the two who eventually get engaged. Just before their wedding, Andrea learns that Mykail was only marrying her to get his green card. As such, she dumps him. He ends up disappearing as the police are after him.
- Connie Ray as Connie Schuler (Seasons 2–4), the over politically correct principal at Cathy's high school, with who Cathy is constantly butting heads over Cathy's actions in dealing emotionally with her cancer while at work.
- Susan Sarandon as Joy Kleinman (Season 3), a motivational speaker. She once had cancer, but it went into remission. She attributes her full recovery to the joy that reentered her life (hence the reason she uses the stage name Joy), "joy" which is what she espouses in her events. Despite Cathy being the one initially to suggest she and Paul go to one of Joy's weekend-long workshops, Cathy ends up believing Joy to be a bitch. Joy, however, ends up being Paul's mentor as she encourages him about his blog, which turns into Paul being Joy's "opening act". Cathy's reaction to Joy is in large part because she knows that Joy sexually propositioned Paul. After Joy is killed from being run over by a bus, Paul takes over her speaking engagement in San Juan, Puerto Rico, which transitions into him developing his own burgeoning self-help empire.
- Hamish Linklater and Mamie Gummer as Dave and Maxine Cooper (Season 3), a relatively poor married couple who are putting their yet unborn baby up for private adoption. After reading on Paul's blog that Cathy wants to adopt, Dave and Maxine choose them to be the adoptive parents. Cathy's joy about this news is short-lived when she, while going to visit them at their motel and seeing them secretly through their motel room window, finds out that Maxine is not really pregnant and this adoption is all a scam to extort money. Cathy exacts revenge by taking Dave and Maxine on a ride in her sports car along an isolated country road on a cold winter day - the car which she was really intending on giving to them until she found out about the scam - when she deserts them there at gunpoint while taking most of their clothes.
- Kailie Torres as Jesse (Season 3), a member of Adam's Bible group, who eventually becomes Adam's girlfriend. Adam and Jesse have anal sex in the mistaken belief that it is not really sex, as she is saving what she considers real sex (vaginal sex) until after marriage.
- Lee Tergesen and Fredi Walker-Browne as Kirby and Shay (Season 3), a bartender and server respectively at the bar Cathy frequents near the hospital. Cathy has told them that she is Alexis, a widowed flight attendant who is getting her commercial pilot's license. Regardless, Cathy sees them as her friends, albeit ones she cannot tell anyone about outside of this circle.
- Brian d'Arcy James and Tammy Blanchard as Tim and Giselle (Season 3), a married couple. Tim is one of Sean's clients of his Willy Wanker gay phone sex service. Sean and Tim agree to meet after Sean breaks from his Willy Wanker persona during one of Tim's calls. Sean initially discovers that Tim is gay-curious. Despite Sean not identifying as either gay or bisexual, he enters into a relationship with Tim and Giselle together (what they refer to as a "thruple"), where each treats the other two as equally as possible. That relationship is short-lived as Tim and Giselle soon discover that they need to focus on themselves as a couple.
- Michael Ray Escamilla as Angel (Seasons 3 and 4), a Puerto Rican fisherman Cathy sees in a hallucination and interprets as her Angel of Death. He accompanies Cathy when she dies.
- Kathy Najimy as Cathy's therapist (Season 4), who is helping her deal emotionally with everything surrounding what is basically her imminent passing to the other side. Portrayed as being a mortal human, she is really a spirit, the gatekeeper who will tell Cathy when it's time to pass over.
- Samantha Futerman as Lydia Hye (Season 4), a friendless, overachieving student at Westhill whom Cathy hires to be Adam's chemistry tutor, because he is failing the class. When it doesn't appear that Adam will pass his chemistry exam, he proposes to Lydia that she help him cheat in return for money. She counterproposes that she will help him cheat if he takes her virginity, not because she is "into" him, but because she knows that he isn't a virgin and she doesn't want to be one by the time she reaches college. Although he reluctantly agrees, she calls it off at the last second because it does not feel right to her. However, after Adam gets a B+ on his exam, they do have a sexual encounter in their mutual excitement over their combined success.
- Isaac Mizrahi as Isaac Mizrahi (Season 4), a guest professor in Andrea's fashion design program. He was excited by the sparkle in Andrea's entrance portfolio that seems to have left her work while she is in the program, which she attributes to her sadness in soon losing Cathy in her life. He shows her that ancient Egyptian tombs were full of sparkle, a perspective that gets Andrea back on track.
- Liz Holtan as Amber (Season 4), Paul's assistant, an overly happy woman who gets on Cathy's nerves because of her focus and stress on the small stuff, but always with a smile. With Paul depressed because of Cathy's imminent death and Adam taking over the running of the household, Adam fires Amber when he learns that she is using their family as a case study for her clinical psychology thesis.

== Critical reception ==
The Big C's pilot episode was received positively by critics, while subsequent episodes received mixed reviews from critics. Season One received an overall score of 66 on Metacritic based on 27 reviews. Alessandra Stanley of The New York Times wrote: "The Big C works because most of the writing is strong and believable, and so is Ms. Linney, who rarely sounds a false note and here has perfect pitch... the series is at its best when sardonic and subdued." Washington Post critic Hank Stuever said: "Buoyed by scalpel-sharp writing and even keener performances, The Big C ...walks a fine line of having it both ways. It's for people who are repelled by the warm-fuzzy, disease-o'-the-week dramas of cable television." EW.com's Ken Tucker quibbled with its major plot point: "My big problem with The Big C concerns a crucial decision the show made for the early episodes: Cathy declines to tell those closest to her that she has cancer. While this is one of the many different reactions people have to such a diagnosis in real life, in a comedy drama like this, it makes everyone around her seem a bit dim."

The second season received similar reviews to the first, receiving a score of 64 on Metacritic based on reviews from 6 critics. Maureen Ryan of AOL TV stated that "Having a character and her family deal with a potentially fatal illness is such a rich arena for both drama and black comedy, but so far, The Big C hasn't been able to mine that topic with consistent freshness and depth." Ken Tucker of Entertainment Weekly was critical towards the show, but commended the acting, stating that "Much of The Big C's unoriginal dramatization of cancer concerns is mitigated by the fresh, dynamic performances of Laura Linney and Oliver Platt."

The third season received a score of 65 on Metacritic based on reviews from 4 critics.

The fourth and final season—consisting of four hour-long episodes received a score of 73 on Metacritic based on reviews from 10 critics.

== Awards and nominations ==
Year	Award	Category	Nominee	Result
2010	Satellite Award	Television Series (Musical or Comedy)	Series	Won
2010	Satellite Award	Best Actress - Television Series (Musical or Comedy)	Laura Linney	Won
2010	Golden Globe Award	Television Series (Musical Or Comedy)	Series	Nominated
2010	Golden Globe Award	Best Actress - Television Series (Musical or Comedy)	Laura Linney	Won
2010	American Cinema Editors Award	Best Edited Half Hour Series for Television	Brian A. Kates	Nominated
2010	Primetime Emmy Award	Outstanding Lead Actress in a Comedy Series	Laura Linney	Nominated
2010	Primetime Emmy Award	Outstanding Guest Actor in a Comedy Series	Idris Elba	Nominated
2010	Primetime Emmy Award	Outstanding Casting for a Comedy Series	Julie Tucker and Ross Meyerson	Nominated
2010	Satellite Award	Television Series (Musical or Comedy)	Series	Nominated
2010	Satellite Award	Best Actress - Television Series (Musical or Comedy)	Laura Linney	Nominated
2012	Golden Globe Award	Best Actress - Television Series (Musical or Comedy)	Laura Linney	Nominated
2012	Primetime Emmy Award	Outstanding Casting for a Comedy Series	Bernard Telsey	Nominated
2013	Primetime Emmy Award	Outstanding Lead Actress in a Miniseries or a Movie	Laura Linney	Won
2013	Primetime Emmy Award	Outstanding Supporting Actor in a Miniseries or a Movie	John Benjamin Hickey	Nominated
