= Brave (2012 video game) =

2012 video game

- North American Xbox 360 cover art
- Developer: Behaviour Interactive
- Publisher: Disney Interactive Studios
- Composer: Philippe Charron
- Platforms: Mac OS X Microsoft Windows; Nintendo DS; PlayStation 3 Wii; Xbox 360
- Release: NA: June 19, 2012; AU: June 21, 2012; EU: July 27, 2012
- Genre: Action-adventure
- Modes: Single-player, multiplayer

Brave is an action-adventure video game adaptation based on the 2012 film of the same name developed by Behaviour Interactive and published by Disney Interactive Studios. Actress Kelly Macdonald, who voiced Merida in the film, reprised her role for the video game.

This was the final Pixar-related title from Disney Interactive Studios prior to its closure in 2016.

== Story ==
The storyline of the video game matches that of the film up until Elinor's transformation into a bear and subsequent escape from the castle, which is where the game begins.

Merida chases her mother through the forest until she reaches the Ring of Stones. Will-o'-the-wisps appear to guide her to the cottage of the witch from whom she originally received the spell. Confronting the witch, Merida demands her mother be changed back. The witch explains that the cursed bear Mor'du has been corrupting a series of waystones with his evil energy, leading to the appearance of hostile creatures. The corruption has grown to the point that it even affects the witch's magic, making its effects unpredictable, thus explaining Elinor's newly-ursine form. Due to her status as the best archer in the kingdom, the witch charges Merida with cleansing the waystones of Mor'du's corruption.

As Merida journeys through the land, she encounters her younger identical triplet brothers (Harris, Hubert, and Hamish), also transformed into bears, and her mother, gradually losing her humanity as the spell stays in effect. After cleansing the last waistone in Mor'du's lair, Merida and her mother come face-to-face with the beast himself, with the princess finally defeating him after a long and arduous battle.

With Mor'du's defeat, Elinor and the triplets are restored to their human forms. Merida states that the journey was good for her because it taught her that she must strike a balance between her desire for adventure and her responsibilities as a princess.

== Gameplay ==
The gameplay consists of single player and local co-operative play. The first player controls Mérida while in co-op mode a second player can take control of a will-o'-the-wisp. Gameplay also features puzzles, which are to be solved with the help of the triplets, and Queen Elinor, who is playable in her bear form in arena fights. Different levels of the game can be accessed from the location called "Ring of Stones". Players can use different types of charms (fire, earth, air, and ice) to add elemental effects to her arrows and sword attacks when fighting enemies, some of which are vulnerable to a certain element.

The PlayStation 3 and Xbox 360 versions of the game are compatible with the PlayStation Move and Kinect motion control peripherals, respectively. This feature comes in the form of an "archery range" mode.

== Development and release ==
THQ was originally reported to be publishing the game and would've been the last title in the original agreement with Pixar that was signed in 2004 (before Disney acquired Pixar in 2006) that was set to expire in 2014. It was instead ultimately published by Disney Interactive Studios (after previously handling the video game adaptions of Toy Story 3 and Cars 2) due to THQ announcing they would be exiting the licensed kids game business in January 2012.

== Reception ==
Reception

Aggregate score
Aggregator	Score
Metacritic	PS3: 71/100; X360: 65/100

The game received mixed reviews from critics who praised the gameplay and style but criticized the Kinect mode in the Xbox 360 version.
