= The Bear King =

- Once Upon a Time episode
- Episode no.: Season 5 Episode 9
- Directed by: Geofrey Hildrew
- Written by: Andrew Chambliss
- Production code: 509
- Original air date: November 15, 2015

Guest appearances
- Jamie Chung as Mulan; Beverley Elliott as Granny / Widow Lucas; Liam Garrigan as King Arthur; Glenn Keogh as King Fergus; Lily Knight as Witch; Amy Manson as Merida; Caroline Morahan as Queen Elinor; Meghan Ory as Red Riding Hood / Ruby Lucas; Paul Telfer as Lord Macintosh

Episode chronology
← Previous "Birth"	Next → "Broken Heart"
- Once Upon a Time season 5

"The Bear King" is the ninth episode of the fifth season of the American fantasy drama series Once Upon a Time, which aired on November 15, 2015. In the episode, Merida, Mulan, and Ruby deal with King Arthur and Zelena. In DunBroch's past, Merida is trained by Mulan.

== Plot ==
=== Opening sequence ===
Merida riding on a horse is featured in the forest.

=== Event chronology ===
The DunBroch flashbacks about King Fergus' death take place two years before "The Bear and the Bow" and in-between the events of "Queen of Hearts" and "And Straight On 'til Morning". The DunBroch flashbacks about the search of the magical helm take place after "The Bear and the Bow". The Camelot flashbacks take place after the scene at the middlemist meadow in "Birth". The Storybrooke flashbacks take place during the last scenes of "There's No Place Like Home".

=== In the Character's Past ===
Two years prior to the present-day events, a rider arrives to the Witch's Hut, and demands to show themselves and asks for magic. The person, King Fergus, is met by a witch who asks what he wants and he says he needs something to ensure the future of his kingdom and says he will pay the price. She says he can pay her later and calls it an IOU and offers him a contract to sign and he stamps it with his signet ring. She says it's a deal and she blends up a potion using a pluck of his hair. Later on, Fergus and Merida walking among the clans. Fergus says he'll take the tongue of the next man who disrespects her. She sees the men writing and thinks they're sending love notes but Fergus says they're writing their last will and testaments. Fergus also gave Merida his prized bow that she can carry into her first battle, and Merida thanked her father for keeping her safe. Merida pulls a sword and challenges the man who knocks her down, but the person who defeated her was Mulan, who says she can teach her how to fight better than any man there and will teach her honor as well. Some of the men watching mock her and call Mulan her nursemaid, but tells her no one will follow her out of fear and says to ask her father since they already follow him. Later that day, Merida came looking for him by the water. He says the invaders are sailing in and he's watching for them. She asks if they will win the war and then says she wants to know how he inspired all these men to follow him into battle. He looks at the helm and she asks if everything is all right. Fergus says you have to show you're the first one willing to die and says that tells them how important it is. He tells her he's the Bear King and can face anything. She sees her father with the helm and discovers that Mulan had kept Merida from going with him. When she arrived and sees a knight coming towards Fergus, Merida aims an arrow at the knight, but misses as the knight kills Fergus. The Knight removes his helm, who is then revealed to be Arthur.

=== In Camelot and DunBroch ===
As Arthur and Zelena return to Camelot, Arthur wants to come up with a plan of action, with Arthur telling her that they would have to go to a place called DunBroch. Over in DunBroch, Merida puts a flower on her father's grave and tells him she saved the boys and proved she's fit to be queen. She says now it's even harder since she has to rule and her father made it look easy. She says she wishes he was here so she could ask him how he did it. Her mother is there and says her father is always with her then says she misses him too. She tells Merida it's not a day for sadness since she's got her coronation. They leave the grave of King Fergus.

Merida is ready to be crowned by her mother as the Queen of Clan DunBroch but the witch bursts in with the contract. Upon learning this, the witch says she wants the helm or 10k of gold by tomorrow night or she'll curse them all to be bears. She tells Merida to lead and figure it out which was something Fergus could not do. Merida's mother searches the house for the helm but can't find it. Merida says he was wearing it when he was killed and the knight who killed him took it. Merida is determined to find this knight and get the helm.

Meanwhile, Mulan pays a visit to some men in a bar demanding they pay her the money that they owe to an unnamed boss. The man refuses and Mulan says that if they don't pay she'll cut off his hand. She then knocks out his two friends and tells him she'll even let him chose if she takes the right or left hand. Merida steps in and puts an arrow in the guy's hand and tells Mulan she needs her help. Mulan says she only helps herself these days and when Merida asks her about the honor in that, Mulan says honor won't fill her purse. Merida asks what happened to her. When Mulan won't help Merida, Merida tosses her a sack of gold and Mulan agrees to help on one condition and says no more questions about her. Later, Merida tells Mulan she won't give up on justice for her dad. Mulan says someone is coming and Merida sends an arrow as Arthur and Zelena appear.

Zelena and Arthur are in the woods and come upon the witch's home and are met by a giant wolf, only to have Zelena throws some sleeping powder on it. The witch appears and says she won't be as easy to subdue. Arthur asks for the magic helm and the witch says she already sent someone to look for it. Zelena holds her head near the cauldron and threatens her and the witch says Merida has it. Arthur is shocked that Merida escaped and Zelena promises to make her pay. They then show up with Zelena demanding it while Merida asks why everyone wants it. Arthur says it has the power to make other men fight your battle and says he needs it but Merida says her father wouldn't use magic to fight his battles. Mulan says they need the helm to protect their people but they don't have it. Zelena takes Merida's bow to use as a tracking device, and tells her she can console herself with the memories of what a terrible ruler her father turned out to be and then tells Arthur they can use it to track the helm and they disappear.

Mulan tells her they can still track the helm and Merida says if her dad can't lead without magic, neither can she. Later, Mulan takes the cloak scrap and goes to see the witch to get her to tell her who the cloak belongs to. She goes into the witch's house and looks around. The wolf snarls and leaps. Mulan backs away and it follows her outside. Then Mulan smiles at her and says she's not a wolf and transforms into Ruby, who told them that Mary Margaret and Emma told them about Mulan and she says she knows Philip and Aurora too. Mulan gets quiet and says it's hard to travel between realms then asks how Red ended up here. It is revealed in a flashback after defeating Zelena that Ruby told Mary Margaret that being the only one of her kind in Storybrooke, she wanted to return to the Enchanted Forest to find others like her with a magic bean given to her by Tiny who had managed to grow one. But when she arrived back in the Enchanted Forest, the pack had already left and so she sought help from the witch to find them but instead, she turned her back into a wolf to be her guard. Arthur and Zelena arrive at the lake and use the spell to bring the helm up, both are stopped by Mulan, Merida, and Ruby. Merida then fights Arthur after finding out he killed her father while Mulan and Ruby use sleeping powder on Zelena as payback. Arthur and Zelena return to Camelot defeated when the clans of DunBroch arrive to aid Merida.

Back in DunBroch, Merida shows off the helm, when the witch showed up for it, but she had a surprise for Merida. The quest for the helm was a test to prove that she was worthy of being the ruler of DunBroch, and she passed the test. The witch gives Merida a pouch of magical ale, to summon her father's spirit from the Underworld. Merida then thanked Mulan and Ruby for helping her, with Ruby and Mulan decide to team up together to find other werewolves. Merida then uses the spell at her father's grave and his spirit appears to her, telling Merida that he was proud of her. After King Fergus' spirit disappears, Merida vows to make Arthur pay.

== Production ==
This episode marked the first in the series that most of the regular cast, with the exception of Ginnifer Goodwin and Rebecca Mader, did not appear.

== Reception ==
This episode received negative reviews. Andrea Towers of Entertainment Weekly notes in her assessment of the review, "While the two back-to-back episodes didn’t make too much sense meshed together, we still learned a lot of important things." Amy Ratcliffe of IGN said of the episode, "The return of Mulan and Ruby was pushed in marketing for the second part of Once Upon a Time's two-hour special, but Merida, Mulan, and Ruby didn't have much screen time together. The dynamic between Mulan and Merida was solid though, and they pushed each other to be better. Merida's had nothing but trouble with her kingdom in all the encounters we've had with her so another quest so soon was wearisome, and it didn't have the emotional pull it could have possessed." Ratcliffe gave the episode a 6.1 rating out of 10. Gwen Ihnat of The A.V. Club gave the episode a mixed review, giving it a C+. In her recap, she cited that the episode was weak in the delivery, saying " I’ve already complained about how the Merida storylines aren’t doing it for me, through no fault of the actress playing her, I just don’t think the Brave canon has much to offer as Merlin’s, say." Christine Orlando of TV Fanatic gave the episode a 4.5 out of 5 stars.
