= Darlene Hunt =

American actress

- Born: Melinda Darlene Hunt; July 7, 1970 (age 56); Lebanon Junction, Kentucky, U.S.
- Occupations: Television producer, writer, actress

Melinda Darlene Hunt (born July 7, 1970) is an American actress, producer and television writer, best known for creating and producing the Showtime series The Big C.

== Career ==
Hunt is from Lebanon Junction, Kentucky and attended Northwestern University. Her writing credits include episodes of 90210, Will & Grace, The Goldbergs, and Save Me. She also created the Showtime series The Big C, starring Laura Linney. The series revolved around the life of suburban wife and high-school teacher Cathy Jaminson, who is diagnosed with melanoma. The Big C premiered on August 16, 2010, and concluded on May 20, 2013. She was nominated for a Golden Globe for being a producer on the series. Hunt is also one of several executive producers of the Fox series Call Me Kat, which premiered on January 3, 2021. That show is set in Louisville, of which Lebanon Junction is located an hour's drive. Other executive producers on that series include Mayim Bialik and Jim Parsons.

As an actress, she is known for her recurring roles in television shows such as Parks and Recreation, Help Me Help You, and Suburgatory. In addition to television, she has appeared in the films I Heart Huckabees and Idiocracy.

== Filmography ==
=== Television ===
Television (Producer/Writer/Creator)
Year	Title	Credited as				Notes
Year	Title	Executive Producer	Consulting Producer	Writer	Creator	Notes
2002	Will & Grace	No	No	Yes	No	1 episode
2003	Good Morning, Miami	No	No	Yes	No	1 episode
2003	Platonically Incorrect	Yes	No	Yes	No	13 episodes
2008	90210	No	Yes	Yes	No	3 episodes produced, 2 wrote
2010–2013	The Big C	No	No	Yes	Yes	Created 39 episodes, wrote 11
2013	Save Me	Yes	No	Yes	No	1 episode
2013	The Goldbergs	No	Yes	Yes	No	1 episodes
2013	Good Girls Revolt	Yes	No	Yes	No	10 episodes
2018	Roseanne	Yes	No	Yes	No	Executive produced 10 episodes, wrote 1
2018-2019	The Conners	No	Yes	Yes	No	Consulting produced 19 episodes, wrote 2
2019	Dickinson	No	Yes	Yes	No	Consulting produced 9 episodes, wrote 1
2021-2023	Call Me Kat	No	No	Yes	Yes	Created 53 episodes, wrote 3
2021	Charlie	Yes	No	Yes	No	TV movie
2021	Patty's Auto	Yes	No	Yes	No	1 episode

Television (Actor)
Year	Title	Role	Notes
1998	Since You've Been Gone	Theater Person	TV movie
2000	Party of Five	Lynda	Episode: "Forgive and Forget"
2000	Becker	Lynda	Episode: "The Bearer of Bad Tidings"
2001	Sabrina the Teenage Witch	Erato	Episode: "Sabrina, the Muse"
2002	Will & Grace	Beth	Episode: Dyeing is Easy, Comedy is Hard
2002	The King (short)	Phyllis	
2005	One on One	Caria	Episode: Shock Jock
2006–2007	Help Me Help You	Darlene	13 Episodes
2008	Greek	Rental Car Worker	Episode: Spring Broke
2009	Hung	Linda	Episode: "This is America or Fifty Bucks"
2010	Donna's Revenge	Marlene	Episode: "Keeping Kosher Every Now and Zen"
2011-2013	Suburgatory	Connie Kushell	3 episodes
2013	The Big C	Hospice Administrator	2 episodes
2014	Longmire	Mrs. McGill	Episode: "In the Pines"
2014	The Night Shift	Mrs. Palmer	2 episodes
2014	Parks And Recreation	Marcia Langman	6 episodes
2015	Hot in Cleveland	Phyllis	Episode: Vegas Baby/I Hate Goodbyes
2016	Dice	Splits Lade	Episode: Prestige
2019	The Conners	Gaby	Episode: Lanford... Lanford
2021	Dickinson	Maggie	13 Episodes
2023	American Auto	Deborah	Episode: Cost Cutting

=== Film ===
Film
Year	Title	Role	Notes
1999	Smut	Millie	
2004	I Heart Huckabees	Darlene	
2006	The Darwin Awards	Minion	
2006	Idiocracy	Yuppie Wife	
2008	The Merry Gentleman	Diane	
2014	Runoff	Paula	
2015	Accidental Love	Doctor Adams	
2020	Lazy Susan	Wendy	Also writer
