= The Child in Time (film) =

2017 British television film

- Film poster
- Genre: Drama
- Based on: The Child in Time by Ian McEwan
- Written by: Stephen Butchard
- Directed by: Julian Farino
- Starring: Benedict Cumberbatch; Kelly Macdonald; Stephen Campbell Moore; Saskia Reeves
- Composer: Adrian Johnston
- Country of origin: United Kingdom
- Original language: English

Production
- Executive producers: Helen Gregory; Benedict Cumberbatch; Adam Ackland; David Boulter; Lucy Richer; Rebecca Eaton; Stephen Butchard
- Producer: Grainne Marmion
- Cinematography: David Odd
- Editor: Kristina Hetherington
- Running time: 90 minutes
- Production companies: SunnyMarch TV; Pinewood Television

Original release
- Network: BBC One
- Release: 24 September 2017

The Child in Time is a British television film directed by Julian Farino, adaptation of the 1987 novel of the same name by Ian McEwan. The film premiered on BBC One on Sunday 24 September 2017 and stars Benedict Cumberbatch.

== Cast and characters ==
- Benedict Cumberbatch as Stephen Lewis, a successful children's book author whose daughter goes missing.
- Kelly Macdonald as Julie, Lewis' estranged wife
- Stephen Campbell Moore as Charles, Lewis' best friend
- Saskia Reeves as Thelma, Charles's wife
- John Hopkins as Home Secretary
- Beatrice White as Kate Lewis

== Production ==
The film was announced on 15 February 2017, as the first commission for Pinewood Television and SunnyMarch TV for BBC One, with Benedict Cumberbatch cast as Stephen Lewis. Kelly Macdonald, Stephen Campbell Moore and Saskia Reeves joined the cast in April 2017. Filming started in April 2017 in London.

== Locations ==
Film locations in London included a Co-op supermarket in Crouch End, Hornsey Town Hall and the National Theatre in Lambeth. Other locations include Shingle Street, a hamlet on the Suffolk coast. The family was depicted as living in Maida Vale and several exterior scenes were filmed around Elgin Avenue.

== Reception ==
=== Critical response ===
On review aggregator Rotten Tomatoes, the film holds an approval rating of 81% based on 21 reviews, and an average rating of 7.2/10. The website's critical consensus reads, "The Child in Time skillfully resists melodrama, trusting the finer details of its story -- and the actors bringing them to life -- to land with a slow-building, devastating impact." On Metacritic, the film has a weighted average score of 83 out of 100, based on 5 critics, indicating "universal acclaim".
