= Perfect Skin =

Perfect Skin may refer to:

- Perfect Skin (film), a 2018 British horror film
- "Perfect Skin" (The 69 Eyes song), 2007
- "Perfect Skin" (Lloyd Cole and the Commotions song), 1984

== See also ==
- Skin care
