= Nina Humphreys =

British composer

Nina Humphreys is a British composer of music for film and television.

Humphries was educated at Brighton College from 1989 to 1991 and has a bachelor's degree in Music from the University of Exeter and an MA in Film Music from Bournemouth University.

== Works ==
Humphreys has composed music for:

Released/ broadcast	Title	Description	Reference
2020	Kat and the Band	British coming-of-age musical film	
2019	Warren	British sitcom featuring Martin Clunes, broadcast on BBC One from 25 February to 1 April 2019	
2016	In Plain Sight	Scottish TV series covering the crimes committed by serial killer Peter Manuel in Lanarkshire in the 1950s, first broadcast on ITV on 6 December 2016	
2013	Manglewood	Early Manglewood track for LittleBigPlanet 3 released in 2014. Developed in 2013.	
2009	All the Small Things (renamed Heart and Soul in some countries)	BBC television drama following the lives and ambitions of a church choir and its members, first broadcast on 31 March 2009	
2006	A for Andromeda	British television science fiction drama serial, a 2006 remake of the 1961 TV series of the same name by Fred Hoyle and John Elliot	
2005	The Robinsons	British comedy television series starring Martin Freeman that debuted on BBC Two on 5 May 2005	
2004	Lie With Me	British television crime drama series, starring Andrew Lincoln and Eve Best, first broadcast on ITV from 15 to 16 November 2004	
2003	Boudica (released in the United States as Warrior Queen)	Television film written by Andrew Davies, first broadcast on 28 September 2003	
2002	Murder	British television crime drama series, starring Julie Walters, first broadcast from 29 May to 19 June 2002 on BBC Two	
2001	Sword of Honour	Television film scripted by William Boyd and starring Daniel Craig	
1999	First series of Bad Girls	Television drama series, broadcast on ITV, focusing on the inmates and staff of a fictional women's prison	
1997	The Lakes	British television drama series, created and principally written by Jimmy McGovern, first broadcast on BBC One on 14 September 1997	
