= Julian Rhind-Tutt =

English actor (born 1967)

- Born: Julian Alistair Rhind-Tutt; 20 July 1967 (age 59); West Drayton, London, England
- Education: Royal Central School of Speech and Drama
- Occupation: Actor
- Years active: 1981–present
- Spouse: Nataša Zajc
- Children: 1

Julian Alistair Rhind-Tutt (born 20 July 1967) is an English actor. His credits include Piccolo Grande Amore (1993), The Madness of King George (1994), Tomorrow Never Dies (1997), Les Misérables (1998), Notting Hill (1999), Hippies (1999), Lara Croft: Tomb Raider (2001), Miranda (2002), Keen Eddie (2003-2004), Green Wing (2004-2006), Stardust (2007), Merlin (2008), Gambit (2012), Rush (2013), The Lady Vanishes (2013), Lucy (2014), Bridget Jones's Baby (2016), Britannia (2017-2021), Harlots (2018-2019), Blithe Spirit (2020), Napoleon (2023), and Kill Jackie (2026).

== Early life ==
Rhind-Tutt was born on 20 July 1967 in West Drayton, London, to Philip Rhind-Tutt, a building business owner, and his wife Joan, as the youngest of five children. He attended the John Lyon School in Harrow, Middlesex, where he acted in school productions, eventually taking the lead in a school production of Hamlet that played at the Edinburgh Festival Fringe in the mid-1980s. After reading English and Theatre Studies at the University of Warwick, he attended the Central School of Speech and Drama in London, where he won the 1992 Carleton Hobbs Award from BBC Radio Drama.

== Career ==
Rhind-Tutt's first significant acting role was as the Duke of York in The Madness of King George (1994). This was followed by a succession of lesser television and film roles. He then landed a major role in William Boyd's First World War drama The Trench (1999), alongside Paul Nicholls and Daniel Craig. His first major recurring TV role was co-starring in the Graham Linehan–Arthur Mathews sitcom Hippies (1999), and he subsequently appeared in several other major British sketch and situation comedy series of the period including Smack the Pony, Absolutely Fabulous, and Black Books. He starred in Green Wing from 2004 to 2006, and had a major role as Inspector Monty Pippin in the cult American show Keen Eddie.

In 2008, he narrated a short film for the 60th anniversary of the Universal Declaration of Human Rights. In 2015 he appeared as Lord Pembroke in the TV series The Bastard Executioner. In 2018, he appeared as the Marquess of Blayne in the Hulu original series Harlots.

In 2026, he starred as assassin Friedrich Mahler, leader of the Demons, working alongside Catherine Zeta-Jones and Daniel Ings in Kill Jackie (2026).

== Personal life ==
Rhind-Tutt is married to Natasa Zajc, a Slovenian make-up artist and yoga instructor. They have a son.

== Filmography ==
=== Film ===
Year	Title	Role	Notes
1993	Piccolo Grande Amore	Barone Von Bismarck	
1994	The Madness of King George	Duke of York	
1997	The Saint	Young Student	
1997	Tomorrow Never Dies	Yeoman – HMS Devonshire	
1998	Les Misérables	Bamatabois	
1998	The Tribe	Forester	
1999	Notting Hill	Time Out Journalist	
1999	The Trench	2nd Lt. Ellis Harte	
2001	Lara Croft: Tomb Raider	Mr Pimms	
2002	Miranda	Rod	
2003	To Kill a King	James	
2005	The River King	Eric Herman	
2006	Rabbit Fever	Rupert	
2007	Stardust	Quartus	
2010	Meant to Be	Will	
2011	Your Highness	Warlock	
2012	Gambit	Xander	
2013	Rush	Bubbles Horsley	
2014	Castles in the Sky	Albert Rowe	
2014	Lucy	The Limey	
2015	Aaaaaaaah!	Ryan	
2015	Burn Burn Burn	Adam	
2016	Bridget Jones's Baby	Fergus, Shazza's husband	
2016	Chubby Funny	Commercial Director	
2017	The Rizen	Blast Door Scientist	
2017	Slovenija, Avstralija in jutri ves svet	Roger Brown	
2020	Blithe Spirit	George Bradman	
2023	Napoleon	Abbé Sieyès	

=== Television ===
Year	Title	Role	Notes
1994	A Breed of Heroes	Lt. Tim Bryant	
1995	The Vacillations of Poppy Carew	Sean	TV film
1997	Richard II	Duke of Aumerle	
1997	Reckless	Danny Glassman	6 episodes
1997	Dangerfield	Adam	Episode: "Adam"
1998	Heat of the Sun	Asst. Supt. James Valentine	3 episodes
1998	An Unsuitable Job for a Woman	Philip Hampson	Episode: "A Last Embrace"
1998	Reckless: The Movie	Danny Glassman	TV film
1999	Let Them Eat Cake	Advisor	3 episodes
1999	Hippies	Alex Picton-Dinch	6 episodes
2000	The Wilsons	Colin	6 episodes
2000	Hero of the Hour	Danny	TV film
2000	Smack the Pony	Uncredited	Episode #2.7
2000–2001	Clocking Off	Peter Cochrane	2 episodes
2001	Sword of Honour	Ian Kilbannock	
2001	Bei aller Liebe	Peter Cobold	Episode: "Kidnapping Lara"
2001	Absolutely Fabulous	Taylor	Episode: "Donkey"
2004	Black Books	Jason Hamilton	Episode: "Travel Writer"
2003–2004	Keen Eddie	Insp. Monty Pippin	13 episodes
2005	The Rotter's Club	Nigel Plumb	3 episodes
2005	E=mc²	Antoine Lavoisier	TV film
2004–2006	Green Wing	'Mac' Macartney	18 episodes
2006	The Secret Policeman's Ball 2006	'Mac' Macartney / Rev Green	TV film
2007	Agatha Christie's Marple	Arthur Calgary	Episode: "Ordeal by Innocence"
2007	The Shadow in the North	Alistair MacKinnon	TV film
2007	Oliver Twist	Edward "Monks" Brownlow	Miniseries, 5 episodes
2007	Seven Ages of Rock	Narrator	
2008	Uncle Max	Conductor	Episode: "Uncle Max Plays the Piano"
2008	Merlin	Edwin Muirden	Episode: "A Remedy to Cure All Ills"
2008	Crooked House	Noakes	Episodes: "Omnibus", "The Wainscoting"
2010	Rude Britannia	Narrator	
2010	Inside John Lewis	Narrator	
2010	The Modern Age of the Coach	Narrator	
2010	Agatha Christie's Poirot	Michael Garfield	Episode: "Hallowe'en Party"
2010	Any Human Heart	John Vivian	Miniseries
2011–2012	The Hour	Angus McCain	12 episodes
2012	Gadget Geeks	Narrator	
2012–2014	A Touch of Cloth	A.C.C. Tom Boss	6 episodes
2013	The Lady Vanishes	Mr. Todhunter	TV film
2013	Wipers Times	Pearson	TV film
2014	Blandings	Galahad Threepwood	2 episodes
2014	Parking Mad	Narrator	
2014, 2024	Inside No. 9	Mark / Party Guest	Episodes: "Sardines", "Plodding On"
2015	Banished	Tommy Barrett	7 episodes
2015	The Devil You Know	Minister Samuel Parris	Episode: "Pilot"
2015	The Bastard Executioner	Lord Pembroke	Episode: "The Bernadette Maneuver/Cynllwyn Bernadette"
2016	Drunk History	Oscar Slater	Episode: "Battle of Waterloo/Arthur Conan Doyle"
2016	Hoff the Record	Bunny Vasilis	Episode: "Finance"
2017	SS-GB	Bernard Staines	2 episodes
2017–2021	Britannia	Prince Phelan	24 episodes
2018	Silent Witness	David Cannon	Episode: "Moment of Surrender"
2018–2019	Harlots	Marquess of Blayne	14 episodes
2019	The Witcher	Giltine	Episode: "Betrayer Moon"
2022	Man vs. Bee	Christian Kolstad-Bergenbatten	4 episodes
2022	The Larkins	Mr Jerebohm	6 episodes
2023	Tom Jones	Fitzpatrick	3 episodes
2023	Extraordinary	Charles II (voice)	Episode: "The Merry Monarch"
2023	The Reckoning	Johnnie Stewart	2 episodes
2024	Sexy Beast	Stephen Eaton	4 episodes
2025	Washington Black	Erasmus Wilde	Post-production
2026	Death in Paradise	Cheech McCarthy	Series 15, Episode 6
2026	Kill Jackie	Friedrich Mahler	Main role

=== Theatre ===
Year	Title	Role
2007	Landscape with Weapon	
2009	Darker Shores (Hampstead Theatre)	

=== Animated television series and video games ===
Year	Title	Role
2005	Sunday Pants (animated television series)	Bob
2006	The Imp (animated television series)	Bob
2009	The Imp: Episode 1 (video game)	Bob

=== Radio ===
Year	Title	Role
1996	People Like Us	Police Detective
1999	BBC Radio 4 Classic Serial:Sketches by Boz	Cymon Tuggs
2000	Arrested Development	Andy
2002	BBC Radio 4 Drama: Magnolia Blossom	Vincent
2003	BBC Radio 4 Drama: Friday's Child	Ferdy Fakenham
2007–2009	The Maltby Collection	Rod Millet
2008	Number 10	Steve McKie
2009	Sapper Bulldog Drummond	Narrator
2012	Bird Island	Graham
2012	Welcome to Our Village, Please Invade Carefully	Field Commander Uljabaan
2012	Alice through the Looking Glass	Lewis Carroll
2013	BBC Radio 4 Book of the Week: The Norfolk Mystery	Narrator
2013	BBC Radio 4 Afternoon Drama: The Gestapo Minutes	Michael Oppenheim
2013	BBC Radio 4 Classic Serial:Three Men in a Boat	Narrator and character "J"
2015	BBC Radio 4 Book of the Week: Birth of a Theorem	Narrator
2015	BBC Radio 4 Book of the Week: The Inheritor's Powder: A Cautionary Tale of Poison, Betrayal and Greed	Narrator
2015	BBC Radio 4 Extra: The Corrections Omnibus	Chip Lambert
2015	BBC Radio 4 Drama: The Norman Conquests	Norman
2016	BBC Radio 4 Drama: Rumpole	Young Rumpole
2021	BBC Radio 4 Drama Series: The Archers	Trevor Fry
2025	BBC Radio 4 Drama: Acqua Alta	Commissario Guido Brunetti
