= Lie with Me (2004 TV series) =

2004 British miniseries

- Genre: Crime drama
- Created by: Stephen Butchard
- Written by: Stephen Butchard
- Directed by: Susanna White
- Starring: Andrew Lincoln; Eve Best; Inday Ba; Paul McGann; Amanda Mealing; Bill Paterson; Mark Lewis Jones
- Composer: Nina Humphreys
- Country of origin: United Kingdom
- Original language: English
- No. of series: 1
- No. of episodes: 2 (list of episodes)

Production
- Executive producer: Christine Langan
- Producer: Lucy Bedford
- Production locations: National Gallery, Trafalgar Square, Central London, England, UK
- Running time: 90 mins. (with advertisements)
- Production company: Granada Television

Original release
- Network: ITV
- Release: 15 November – 16 November 2004

Lie with Me is a British television crime drama series first broadcast on ITV from 15 to 16 November 2004. The two-part serial stars Andrew Lincoln and Eve Best as Will Tomlinson and Roselyn Tyler, a police officer and a victim drawn together during the course of a murder investigation. The serial received good viewing figures at the time of broadcast, but was critically panned, many blaming the poor ending as a reason for ITV not to renew it as an ongoing series. The DVD of the serial was released on 15 January 2007.

== Plot ==
Drugged with GHB, Ros Tyler (Eve Best) has no recollection of her weekend activities. When she awakens, however, she discovers that she has been raped, and her roommate has been murdered. Will (Andrew Lincoln) is assigned to the case as Lead Investigator. When Will and Ros slowly find attraction to one another - she for the security and he for the frailty - their desire for justice, and vindication, leads them towards a difficult and illegal action.

== Cast ==
- Andrew Lincoln as DI Will Tomlinson
- Eve Best as Roselyn Tyler
- Inday Ba as Ms. Reed
- Paul McGann as Gerry Henson
- Amanda Mealing as Carolyn Henson
- Bill Paterson as DCI Collman
- Mark Lewis Jones as Paul Stebbings
- Anthony Flanagan as Tom Fraser
- Josephine Butler as Donna Grogan

== Episode list ==
| No. | Title | Directed by | Written by | Original release date | UK viewers (millions) |
|---|---|---|---|---|---|
| 1 | "Episode 1" | Susanna White | Stephen Butchard | 15 November 2004 | 7.23m |
Ros Tyler wakes from a drugged sleep to find that her flatmate is dead and she herself has been viciously sexually assaulted. She has also suffered acute memory loss and has no recollection of events of the previous night. DI Will Tomlinson, who is leading the investigation, finds himself falling for Ros and becomes convinced of the killer's identity, but his world is turned upside down when the CPS decide not to prosecute.
| 2 | "Episode 2" | Susanna White | Stephen Butchard | 16 November 2004 | 5.41m |
After deciding to lie, Ros tells the court that she can identify her attacker. He protests his innocence but the decision goes against him. Soon she starts to receive anonymous letters from someone who knows that she has lied. Her relationship with Will changes and the pressures begin to show. She soon discovers that the truth can be more dangerous than a lie.
