= Parking Mad =

Parking Mad is a television documentary series about parking, shown on BBC Two.

It was first broadcast on 2013 with a second series shown in 2015 and is narrated by Julian Rhind-Tutt.

== Reception ==
Sameer Rahim in The Telegraph called it highly entertaining and said that it "lightly broached a serious issue". Sam Wollaston in The Guardian called Parking Mad a good documentary that was balanced, gave a voice to all and then sat back and observed as they went at each other.
