= Liam Garrigan =

English actor (born 1981)

- Born: 17 October 1981 (age 44); Kingston upon Hull, England
- Education: Guildhall School of Music and Drama
- Occupation: Actor
- Years active: 2003–present
- Spouse: Beth Rowley (m. 2017)
- Children: 2

Liam Garrigan (born 1981) is an English actor. As a youth, he attended classes at Kingston upon Hull's Northern Theatre Company and was a student at Wyke College, Kingston upon Hull. His first television role was in 2003 as Nic Yorke in the BBC continuing drama series Holby City. He is best known for his roles as Ian Al-Harazi on the Fox series 24: Live Another Day (2014), as King Arthur in the ABC series Once Upon a Time (2015–2016), the film Transformers: The Last Knight (2017), and as Thomas Jopson on AMC's The Terror (2018). He also provides the voice for Captain Kurt in the role-playing game GreedFall.

== Career ==
Garrigan was sent to musical theatre classes by his mother at an early age. He was five years old when he played a munchkin in Northern Theatre's production of The Wizard of Oz, and he later began, at age seven, to have one-on-one acting lessons with Northern Theatre's founder Richard Green. After attending Endsleigh Primary School and St Mary's, Garrigan studied at Wyke Sixth Form College, where he focused on theatre studies, history and English literature, while continuing acting classes at Northern Theatre, as well as giving performances at the National Theatre and the Edinburgh Festival. During his time at Wyke, he began working on audition pieces for drama school, with his eventual admission into the Guildhall School of Music and Drama, where he trained to be a professional actor.

He has appeared in BBC TV dramas Holby City, Doctors, The Chase and ITV1's Agatha Christie's Marple. He also portrayed Alfred in the Starz TV miniseries The Pillars of the Earth. He appeared in Ultimate Force as Corporal Edward Dwyer during the third series. He also starred in the 2008 and 2010 seasons of Irish drama series, RTÉ's Raw. In January 2011, Garrigan starred in the second series of BBC One's wartime drama serial Land Girls. From 2012 to 2013, Garrigan starred as Sgt. Liam Baxter in Strike Back, before being cast as Ian Al-Harazi in 2014's 24: Live Another Day. The same year, he appeared in the American 3D action fantasy film, The Legend of Hercules. In January 2014, Garrigan appeared in Silent Witness. In 2015, Garrigan was cast in the recurring role of King Arthur for the fifth season of Once Upon a Time, and later portrayed a different iteration of the character in the 2017 film Transformers: The Last Knight.

== Personal life ==
Garrigan was born in Kingston upon Hull, East Yorkshire, England, to Liz and Brian Garrigan, and he is the eldest of three siblings. In September 2016, Garrigan became engaged to singer-songwriter Beth Rowley. The two were married on 1 July 2017 and have two sons named Sidney (2019) and Sonny (2022).

== Filmography ==
=== Film ===
Year	Title	Role	Notes
2014	The Legend of Hercules	Iphicles	
2017	Transformers: The Last Knight	King Arthur	
2021	Cherry	Captain	

=== Television ===
Year	Title	Role	Notes
2003	Holby City	Nic Yorke	25 episodes
2004	The Afternoon Play	Ben Rose	Episode: "Sons, Daughters and Lovers"
2004	Doctors	Scott Renshaw	Episode: "Gap Year"
2005	Ultimate Force	Edward Dwyer	4 episodes
2005	Silent Witness	Nathan Archer	Episodes: "Ghosts: Part 1 & Part 2"
2005	Totally Frank	DJ Dan	Episode: "Bad Girl"
2006–2007	The Chase	Matt Lowe	20 episodes
2008	He Kills Coppers	Jonathan Young	TV film
2008–2011	Raw	Bobby Breen	16 episodes
2009	Agatha Christie's Marple	Stephen Restarick	Episode: "They Do It with Mirrors"
2009	Blue Murder	Billy Radfield	Episode: "This Charming Man"
2010	Inn Mates	Pete	TV film
2010	The Pillars of the Earth	Alfred	8 episodes
2011	Land Girls	Reverend Henry Jameson	4 episodes
2011	The Night Watch	Reggie Nigri	TV film
2012–2013	Strike Back	Sgt. Liam Baxter	11 episodes
2014	Silent Witness	Dr. Christy Nash	Episodes: "Fraternity: Part 1 & Part 2"
2014	Endeavour	Tony Frisco	Episode: "Trove"
2014	24: Live Another Day	Ian Al-Harazi	7 episodes
2015	Spotless	Victor Clay	10 episodes
2015–2016	Once Upon a Time	King Arthur	11 episodes
2018	The Terror	Thomas Jopson	9 episodes
2018	The End of the World As We Know It	Gah'ree	TV film
2020	Alex Rider	Martin Wilby	4 episodes
2020	Small Axe	Greg Huggan	Episode: "Red, White and Blue"
2021	Domina	Marcus Antonius	2 episodes
2021	Cobra	Tommy	Episode: "Cyberwar 4"
2021	Invasion	Hughes	Episode: "Crash"
2021	The Outlaws	Young Frank	Episode #1.4
2022	War of the Worlds	Gideon	2 episodes
2023	Sanditon	Samuel Colbourne	5 episodes
2023	The Long Shadow	PS Bob Blake	5 episodes
2024	Belgravia: The Next Chapter	Fletcher	8 episodes
2024	Moonflower Murders	Leonard Collins	4 episodes

=== Video games ===
Year	Title	Role	Notes
2018	Thronebreaker: The Witcher Tales	Gascon	Voice role
2019	GreedFall	Captain Kurt	
TBA	Squadron 42	Duncan Chakma Master-at-Arms	In production
