= True Love (TV series) =

- Genre: Drama
- Written by: Dominic Savage
- Directed by: Dominic Savage
- Starring: David Tennant; Billie Piper; Lacey Turner; David Morrissey; Jane Horrocks; Ashley Walters
- Opening theme: "What the World Needs Now Is Love" by Dionne Warwick
- Country of origin: United Kingdom
- Original language: English
- No. of series: 1
- No. of episodes: 5

Production
- Executive producers: Juliette Howell; Tim Bevan; Eric Fellner; Lucy Richer (for BBC)
- Producer: Guy Heeley
- Production locations: Margate, Kent, England
- Running time: 30 minutes
- Production companies: Working Title Television; BBC

Original release
- Network: BBC One
- Release: 17 June – 20 June 2012

True Love is a five-episode 2012 semi-improvised BBC television drama, which began on BBC One on 17 June 2012.

Each episode is a self-contained story (though there is some cross-over between all the episodes), devised through improvisation (a first for BBC One drama), exploring an issue related to love and relationships. True Love had its first public screening at the Turner Contemporary in Margate on 29 March 2012. The series premiered on 17 June 2012 on BBC One, the remaining four episodes being stripped across the next three nights, with the final two airing as a double-bill on 20 June. True Love was originally titled Love Life but was re-titled to avoid confusion with an ITV series with the same title.

== Plot ==
While each episode is self-contained, the series is set in the English seaside town of Margate, Kent. There is some overlap between episodes.

- Episode one centres on Nick (David Tennant), whose happy marriage is turned upside-down by the reappearance of his first love.
- Episode two centres on Paul (Ashley Walters), who is married to Michelle (Lacey Turner), a new father who experiences "love at first sight".
- Episode three centres on Holly (Billie Piper), a teacher who lives alone and is in an unhappy affair with a married man. Holly develops feelings for a student in her class (Kaya Scodelario).
- Episode four centres on Sandra (Jane Horrocks), a middle-aged woman in a stale marriage to an unfaithful husband. Jane Horrocks plays a shop keeper who is trapped in a loveless relationship and embarks on a passionate affair with a mysterious man.
- Episode five centres on Adrian (David Morrissey), a divorcé who lives in a flat in a tower block with his 16-year-old daughter. He begins a relationship with a woman he meets through the Internet. At the same time, his daughter's best friend (Jo Woodcock) develops an unrequited obsessive love for him.

== Filming ==
True Love was filmed entirely in Margate and surrounding areas between early September and mid-October 2011. Billie Piper's episode was partially shot at The Charles Dickens School in Broadstairs, where some of the current students were invited to be extras, filming scenes alongside Piper. Other prominent locations include Botany Bay, Turner Contemporary, Westwood Cross shopping centre, and Margate railway station.

== Cast ==
- David Tennant as Nick (appears in episode 1)
- Ashley Walters as Paul (appears in episode 2)
- Billie Piper as Holly (appears in episode 3)
- Jane Horrocks as Sandra (appears in episode 4)
- David Morrissey as Adrian (appears in episode 5)
- Vicky McClure as Serena, Nick's first love (appears in episode 1)
- Jaime Winstone as Stella, Paul's lover (appears in episode 2)
- Kaya Scodelario as Karen, Holly's pupil and lover, and Adrian's daughter (appears in episodes 3 and 5)
- Alexander Siddig as Ismail, Sandra's lover (appears in episode 4)
- Gemma Chan as Kathy, Adrian's lover (appears in episode 5)
- Joanne Froggatt as Ruth, Nick's wife (appears in episode 1)
- Lacey Turner as Michelle, Serena's younger sister and Paul's wife (appears in episodes 1 and 2)
- Jo Woodcock as Lorraine, Nick's daughter and Karen's best friend (appears in episodes 1, 3 and 5)
- Charlie Creed-Miles as David, Sandra's husband and Holly's lover (appears in episodes 3 and 4)
- Jenny Agutter as Holly's mother (appears in episode 3)
- Luke Bryant as Darren, Nick's son (appears in episode 1)
- Peter McNeil O'Connor as Jim, Nick's friend (appears in episode 1)
- Aymen Hamdouchi as Gavin, Paul's friend (appears in episode 2)
- Vahid Gold as Chris, one of Holly's pupils (appears in episode 3)
- Genevieve Barr as Sarah, Sandra's daughter (appears in episode 4)
- Neil Bell as Phil, Adrian's friend (appears in episode 5)

== Ratings ==
Episode-viewing figures are from Broadcast Now and Digital Spy.

Episode no.	Airdate	Episode title	Total viewers (millions)
1	17 June 2012	Nick	3.11
2	18 June 2012	Paul	2.64
3	19 June 2012	Holly	2.8
4	20 June 2012	Sandra	1.77
5	20 June 2012	Adrian	1.49

== Reception ==
The first episode was received negatively by most critics. Reviewing the episode for The Daily Telegraph, Isabel Mohan criticised the plot and Margate backdrop, both of which she found uninspiring, while Sam Wollaston of The Guardian compared the storyline, overlaid with sentimental music, unfavourably to an edition of the Our Tune radio feature. The Independent's Terence Blacker was also unenthusiastic: "It messed up the story, revealing the outcome of a will-they-won't-they tale of infidelity before a single word of dialogue had been spoken."
