= Arrested Development (radio series) =

- Genre: Comedy
- Running time: 30 minutes
- Country of origin: United Kingdom
- Language(s): English
- Home station: BBC Radio 4
- Starring: Letitia Dean; Susannah Doyle; Phil Cornwell; Julian Rhind-Tutt
- Written by: Simon Warne
- Produced by: Tracey Neale
- Original release: May 2000 – June 2000
- No. of series: 1
- No. of episodes: 4
- Audio format: Stereophonic sound
- Website: Official BBC Page

Arrested Development was a short-lived British radio programme that aired from May to June 2000. There were four half-hour episodes and it was broadcast on BBC Radio 4. It starred Letitia Dean and Susannah Doyle. The show was written by Simon Warne and produced by Tracey Neale.

== Episodes ==
=== Episode 1 ===
Penny and Dave are to get married; however, the day proves full of problems, with Penny's hair being one of them.

=== Episode 2 ===
Penny's sister Kate must help her come to terms with Dave jilting her on the wedding day.

=== Episode 3 ===
Kate's cottage is left ruined after she hires an over-enthusiastic builder.

=== Episode 4 ===
Bob attempts to woo Kate back, while Penny contemplates the future after her relationship broke down.
