= Land Girls (TV series) =

2009 BBC television series

- Genre: Drama; Costume drama
- Created by: Roland Moore
- Written by: Roland Moore; Dominique Moloney; Dale Overton; Paul Matthew Thompson; Jude Tindall; Joy Wilkinson
- Directed by: Steve Hughes; Paul Gibson; Daniel Wilson; Matt Carter; Ian Barber
- Starring: Summer Strallen; Christine Bottomley; Jo Woodcock; Becci Gemmell; Seline Hizli; Lou Broadbent; Nathaniel Parker; Sophie Ward; Danny Webb; Susan Cookson; Mark Benton; Mykola Allen; Liam Boyle
- Country of origin: United Kingdom
- Original language: English
- No. of series: 3
- No. of episodes: 15

Production
- Executive producers: Will Trotter; John Yorke
- Producers: Erika Hossington; Ella Kelly
- Running time: 45 minutes
- Production company: BBC

Original release
- Network: BBC One, BBC HD
- Release: 7 September 2009 – 11 November 2011

Land Girls is a British television period drama series, first broadcast on BBC One on 7 September 2009. Land Girls was created by Roland Moore and commissioned by the BBC to commemorate the 70th anniversary of the outbreak of the Second World War. The programme was BBC Daytime's first commission of a period drama. Land Girls was filmed in and around the city of Birmingham. The first series features Summer Strallen, Christine Bottomley, Jo Woodcock and Becci Gemmell as four girls in the Women's Land Army during the war.

Land Girls won the "Best Daytime Programme" at the 2010 Broadcast Awards and in that same year the BBC announced that it had commissioned a second series, comprising five episodes. Woodcock and Gemmell reprised their roles as Bea and Joyce and Seline Hizli made her debut as new girl, Connie Carter. The second series began airing from 17 January 2011 and two months later BBC Daytime Controller, Liam Keelan, renewed Land Girls for a third series. It began airing from 7 November 2011.

== Plot ==
The titular Land Girls are Nancy Morrell (Summer Strallen), Joyce Fisher (Becci Gemmell), Bea Holloway (Jo Woodcock) and Annie Barratt (Christine Bottomley), who have arrived at the Hoxley Estate to begin their new working lives at the Pasture Farm—owned by Frederick Finch (Mark Benton)—and the opulent manor occupied by Lord and Lady Hoxley (Nathaniel Parker and Sophie Ward). The women have joined the Women's Land Army for different reasons but share the same goal – to help win the war. Nancy is forced into joining the Women's Land Army when female conscription begins. Joyce wants to serve her country like her husband. Annie signs up herself and her younger sister Bea so they can escape their abusive father. As the girls adapt to their new surroundings and begin the hard work, their lives begin to change. About a year later, Bea is married to Billy (Liam Boyle) and Joyce is still working at the farm. The brash Connie Carter (Selin Hizli) arrives to do her duty, and American industrialist Jack Gillespie (Clive Wood) comes to the Hoxley Estate on business. The third series once again focuses on the lives of the land girls at the Hoxley estate. After the local military hospital is bombed, the patients and staff relocate to Hoxley Manor. Connie is engaged to Reverend Henry Jameson (Liam Garrigan; Gwilym Lee) and Iris Dawson (Lou Broadbent) arrives at the farm.

== Conception and development ==
Land Girls was conceived by Roland Moore, who wanted to cover the subject matter of the Women's Land Army in an ensemble drama. Once he had the idea, Moore set about creating the characters of Nancy, Joyce, Annie and Bea and devising story ideas from them. He told a reporter from the Writers' Guild of Great Britain, "In the 1940s, class was obviously much more of an issue than it is now, so it made sense to capitalise on this factor by ensuring that the girls came from a mix of working and middle classes. During development of the series, Will Trotter (executive producer) suggested adding some upper class characters; so Lord and Lady Hoxley were added. This fully-fleshed out the class element of the series and enabled us to devise stories that threw a spotlight onto the great social leveller that was World War Two."

Moore named the four main characters after his grandmother and great-aunts, which made the names authentic for the time period. He also read accounts from real life land girls to make sure his stories were believable. The writer decided to set each forty-five-minute episode three months apart to give the series "a unique format". He also wanted the series to be fast-paced. As well as focusing on the land girls, Moore decided to "shed light on other less well-known aspects of the home front", including segregation of black and white American troops, the hunt for Nazi sympathisers and the use of prisoners of war as labourers.

Will Trotter from BBC Drama Birmingham was looking for a Second World War drama to pitch to the BBC Daytime Controller, Liam Keelan. Trotter liked Moore's idea and it was soon green-lit. They, along with John Yorke, producer Erika Hossington and the directors, then began working to finalise the scripts. Ann Kramer, an historian specialising in the Women's Land Army, also helped out. The BBC announced the commission of Land Girls in June 2009, revealing that the series would air from 7 September 2009 to commemorate the 70th anniversary of the start of the Second World War. Keelan stated "I'm delighted to be able to place Land Girls at this time of the day as part of a unique week of programming. We hope to pay tribute, not only to the many lives that were lost in the Second World War, but also to the land girls who played such an important role on the home front. We hope it'll be seen by as wide an audience as possible."

In March 2010, it was announced that a second series of Land Girls had been commissioned and that filming would begin later in the year. The BBC said the second series would see a return to the rural Forties and continue to examine the women who helped the war effort. Keelan said "The first series of Land Girls was something completely new for BBC One Daytime. It proved to be such a success with our viewers that I'm delighted to be able to announce the commission of a second series". Keelan added that he hoped the second series would continue to be a tribute to the real land girls. Trotter and Yorke returned as executive producers and Trotter said that the second series would see some old faces returning and some new ones arriving.

Two months after the second series had concluded, Keelan renewed Land Girls for a third series. Of the third series, Keelan said "It builds on the success of the previous two series which our viewers have loved for the dramatic way they have told the story of land girls – and their families and friends – in the Second World War." Trotter added that it was "brilliant" to continue the land girls' story and that the new series would give the team an opportunity to further explore "how those left at home lived their lives in the shadow of the Second World War."

== Production ==
=== Casting ===
Summer Strallen was cast in the role of rich girl Nancy Morrell. Strallen read diaries and books on the land girls while she was preparing for her role. Of her character, Strallen said "Basically at the beginning, Nancy is a pain in the backside, she's one of those girls who has finished school and is looking to find a husband. [..] You hate to love her but it's not all dances and working on the farm. The actual reality of war sets in when someone in authority is challenging her patriotism." Strallen added that she enjoyed wearing the 1940s costumes and the hairstyles and that she had enjoyed filming the series.

Becci Gemmell was cast as the patriotic Joyce Fisher, a woman whose parents were killed in an air raid and whose husband has been posted overseas. Like Strallen, Gemmell read diaries of the land girls during her research for the role. She also spoke to a former land girl who gave her some inside knowledge. The character of Joyce is Gemmell's first television role and she said that she "really loved" filming the series and hoped there would be a second run.

Former Hope Springs actress Christine Bottomley was cast as the sensible and cautious Annie. Bottomley also researched the land girls after securing the role of Annie. Of filming the series, she said "I loved the experience of working in a completely different era and the completely different look." Jo Woodcock was cast as Annie's younger sister, Bea.

Nathaniel Parker and Sophie Ward were cast as Lord Lawrence Hoxley and Lady Ellen Hoxley respectively. Parker and Ward had previously worked together on A Village Affair.

Mark Benton was cast as Farmer Finch, Danny Webb as Dennis Tucker and Susan Cookson as Esther Reeves. Fourteen-year-old Mykola Allen joined the cast as Esther' son, Martin.

The cast for series two was announced in June 2010. Woodcock and Gemmell returned to their roles of Bea and Joyce. Woodcock said she was "delighted" to return as she really likes her character.

Six other cast members from the first series also reprised their roles, including Sophie Ward, Mark Benton, Danny Webb, Susan Cookson, Mykola Allen and Liam Boyle. It was also revealed that four new characters were to be introduced. Seline Hizli was cast as new girl, Connie Carter, who the Herts Advertiser said would "ruffle a few feathers". Land Girls is Hizli's first television role. Raquel Cassidy was cast in the role of Lady Hoxley's sister, Diana Granville. Clive Wood and Liam Garrigan joined as American businessman Jack Gillespie and Reverend Henry Jameson respectively. Keelan said that it was "wonderful" to have many of the original cast returning.

The BBC announced on 16 June 2011 that Gemmell and Hizli had reprised their roles as Joyce and Connie for the third series, along with Sophie Ward, Mark Benton, Susan Cookson, Mykola Allen, Nicholas Shaw, David Schofield and Carolyn Pickles. Lou Broadbent joined the cast as new girl Iris Dawson and Gwilym Lee took over the role of Henry Jameson. Other new cast members included Dominic Mafham as Dr Richard Channing, Joe Armstrong as Danny Sparks, Paul Ritter as Dennis Tucker's brother Frank and Samuel Edward-Cook as Walter.

=== Filming ===
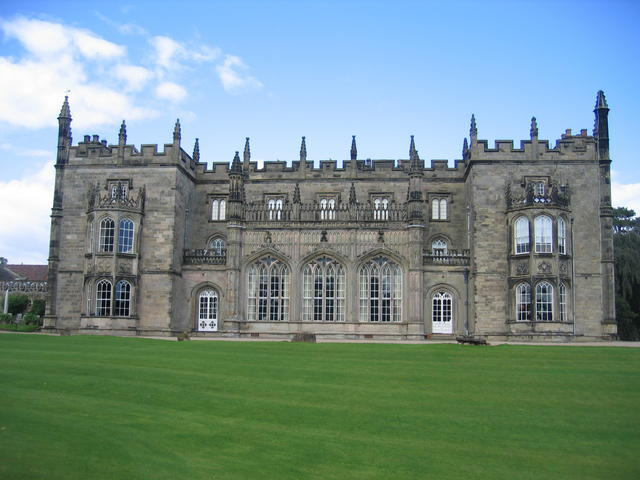
Arbury Hall in Nuneaton was transformed into the fictional Hoxley Manor.

Filming on the first series began in July 2009 in Birmingham and Land Girls became the first period drama to film there since 1994's Martin Chuzzlewit. Crew from the BBC's daytime drama, Doctors, worked on the shoot, which lasted for seven weeks. Erika Hossington, the series' producer, said "Drama production has fantastic roots in Birmingham, but it's all happening again now with shows like Doctors, Survivors, Hustle and now Land Girls."

A real farm near Henley-in-Arden in Warwickshire doubled for the Pasture farm, where the girls live and work. Hoxley Manor was created using Arbury Hall in Nuneaton. The Black Country Living Museum, Stoneleigh Abbey, the Fleece Inn and Toddington railway station were also used for location shooting. Moore revealed that the series' location manager Michael Grisewood and series producer Sam Hill managed to secure the locations and that they needed very little set dressing. Things like satellite dishes, double glazing and pylons needed to be disguised by the production staff and trees with leaves had to be hidden during filming of winter scenes.

Hossington said that the biggest challenge of the shoot was finding a farmer who was prepared to plough a field out of season for use during an episode set in the winter months. She said "It went right to the wire and we only found one a couple of days before filming. Farms are governed by so many rules and subsidies and have to be very careful about what land they use. We're shooting the girls picking swedes and beets, trying to look as cold as possible despite the sweltering heat." As Moore wanted each episode to be set three months apart, the design team were "stretched" with having to get the field ploughed and getting crops to grow at the wrong time of year. Trotter said that he had wanted to film another drama in Birmingham for a while and that he wanted to give the Doctors crew an opportunity to film something big. He explained that the ambition of Land Girls is "far greater than the budget would suggest," citing the use of the real Messerschmitt plane as an example.

Trotter said that he had looked at using CGI for the plane, but that it did not look good, so the team found a real plane and someone willing to fly it. He added that using the real plane actually worked out cheaper than using CGI. All of the costumes were hired from London and they had to be authentic for the time period.

The second series was also filmed on location in the West Midlands. For the opening of the first episode, Gemmell's character, Joyce, is taken for a flight in a Tiger Moth plane. Gemmell said that she did not get to fly in the plane and instead she was taxied around a field. As the pilot was getting ready to fly everyone on the set had to be quiet, so he could talk to people via the radio. Gemmell said "It's quite something standing with 30 people spread out across a field in total silence for a good 10 minutes, then hearing in the distance the rumble of a plane engine getting louder and louder." She also praised the make-up department for getting her wig to stay on during filming. Gemmell added that the second series was tough to film especially for the team behind the scenes.

== Broadcasting ==
The first series consisted of five episodes lasting 45 minutes, which were broadcast across five days on BBC One beginning from 7 September 2009. The series was also available on BBC HD and the BBC iPlayer. Land Girls was given an early evening time slot of 5.15pm and it was later repeated on Sunday evenings. Land Girls made its debut in Canada on 6 June 2010 on the Sundance Channel.

The second series of Land Girls began airing on 17 January 2011. The new series was once again made up of five 45-minute episodes and simulcast in HD on the BBC HD channel. On 19 January 2011, it was announced that Land Girls had been sold to Sundance Channel Global, which covers France, Benelux, Asia and Eastern Europe. The series will also be shown by the Australian Broadcasting Corporation, the Danish broadcasting corporation, DR, the Globosat television service in Brazil and the Finnish broadcasting company, YLE. The third series of Land Girls began airing on BBC One from 7 November 2011.

From 18 January 2012, series one of Land Girls was broadcast on Yesterday. The series was repeated on BBC One in September 2020, due to the lack of episodes of Doctors as a result of the impact of the COVID-19 pandemic on television.

== Episodes ==
=== Series 1 (2009) ===
No. overall	No. in series	Title	Directed by	Written by	Original release date
1	1	"Childhood's End"	Steve Hughes	Roland Moore	7 September 2009
Nancy, Joyce, Annie and Bea arrive at the Hoxley Estate and are assigned their duties by Farmer Finch and Esther Reeves (Susan Cookson). Bea rebels from her sister's control. She unsuccessfully petitions for segregation among American troops to be ended and finds herself charmed by Corporal Cal Gillespie (Christian Brassington). Nancy takes against Lady Hoxley and tries to get closer to Lord Hoxley.
2	2	"Secrets"	Steve Hughes	Dominique Moloney	8 September 2009
Bea is pregnant and finding it difficult to conceal her situation from those around her. Sergeant Dennis Tucker (Danny Webb) is on the lookout for enemy sympathisers and focuses his attentions on Nancy. He asks Esther to read the women's letters. Finch and Martin (Mykola Allen) sell home made carrot whisky. Lord Hoxley's horse is injured and he realises that his marriage is over. Annie receives news that her husband has been killed in action.
3	3	"Codes of Honour"	Paul Gibson	Roland Moore	9 September 2009
Three months later and Nancy and Lord Hoxley are having an affair. Annie is not dealing well with her husband's death and Joyce is hiding her deserter husband, John (Nicholas Shaw). Esther has started to screen Nancy's letters for Tucker, who believes that she is a Nazi collaborator. Bea is six months pregnant and still trying to hide her condition. Ernest Luckhurst (David Sibley), a food rations officer, arrives at the farm intent on catching Finch out.
4	4	"Trekkers"	Paul Gibson	Dale Overton	10 September 2009
Finch hires some cheap labourers, but following a break-in at the manor, Lady Hoxley orders Finch to get rid of them and a riot breaks out. The Hoxleys hold a party, where Joyce tells Lady Hoxley about Nancy's affair with her husband. Billy Finch proposes to Bea, but she goes into labour before she can give him her answer. Annie receives some shocking news about her husband.
5	5	"Destinies"	Daniel Wilson	Roland Moore	11 September 2009
Lady Hoxley reveals her husband's secret to Nancy. Bea prepares for her and Billy's wedding, but she realises that Finch has doubts about her. Annie faces a choice over her duty to her husband and her love for Adam Blackfield (Richard Harrington). Tucker sets out for revenge, which ends with Lord Hoxley's death and shocking consequences for all four girls.

=== Series 2 (2011) ===
No. overall	No. in series	Title	Directed by	Written by	Original release date
6	1	"Back to the Land"	Steve Hughes	Roland Moore	17 January 2011
A new girl, Connie, arrives at the farm and sets her sights on Billy. The manor house has been commandeered by the Americans, which excites Lady Hoxley's sister, Diana (Raquel Cassidy). John visits Joyce at the farm and Martin has an accident. Tucker is released from prison. Finch enters his pig into a county show, so it can avoid slaughter.
7	2	"Displaced Loyalties"	Steve Hughes	Paul Matthew Thompson	18 January 2011
Following his fall, Martin is found to have detached retinas. He is also hiding an injured man. Diana tries to help Jack Gillespie (Clive Wood) find his grandson and Joyce receives bad news about John. Finch tries to keep his contraband deals from Mrs Gulliver (Carolyn Pickles). Bea becomes friends with Salvatore Zappulo (Cesare Taurasi), an Italian POW, while Connie flirts with piano player, Henry (Liam Garrigan).
8	3	"Final Reckoning"	Daniel Wilson	Dominique Moloney	19 January 2011
Bea allows Jack to meet his grandson. Connie discovers that Henry is actually a Reverend. Joyce follows Martin and finds Ulrich Keitmeiler (Benjamin Wilkin), the German airman he has been hiding. Esther is desperate for money to pay for Martin's operation, so Finch organises a boxing match with Vernon Storey (David Schofield).
9	4	"Fight the Good Fight"	Daniel Wilson	Jude Tindall	20 January 2011
A week later, Joyce is still in shock after shooting Ulrich dead. Connie helps Joseph Price (Sam Walton), a young evacuee, reunite with his sister and mother. Tucker works with Billy to improve his shooting and Jack tries to convince Bea to come to Chicago with him. After being turned down by Lady Hoxley, Esther asks Vernon for the money for Martin's operation.
10	5	"Darkest Hours"	Matt Carter	Roland Moore	21 January 2011
Connie meets with the bishop to win Henry's love and respect. Joyce plans to leave the Land Army after recent events and she forces Tucker into making a confession. Finch learns how Esther got the money for Martin's operation. Jack prepares to leave England with his grandson, but without Bea or Diana. Billy reveals that he has been called up.

=== Series 3 (2011) ===
No. overall	No. in series	Title	Directed by	Written by	Original release date
11	1	"Home to Roost"	Ian Barber	Dominique Moloney	7 November 2011
Hoxley Manor becomes a makeshift hospital and Lady Ellen is shocked to see Doctor Richard Channing (Dominic Mafham). Frank Tucker (Paul Ritter) arrives at the Pasture Farm and befriends the new land girl Iris Dawson (Lou Broadbent). Connie and Henry (Gwilym Lee) celebrate their engagement. Joyce gets some good news about her missing husband. A drunken Farmer Finch drives into Mrs Gulliver's garden and he and Martin make a discovery.
12	2	"The War in the Fields"	Ian Barber	Paul Matthew Thompson	8 November 2011
Connie is rattled by Danny Sparks (Joe Armstrong), a face from her past. Lady Hoxley invites local dignitary, Miss Timpson (Annette Badland), to the village fete and she receives a job offer. The land girls take on Vernon Storey and his boys during a ploughing competition. Esther tries to keep her pregnancy a secret.
13	3	"The Enemy Within"	Ian Barber	Rob Kinsman	9 November 2011
John recalls how he escaped from France. Iris worries about her lamb when it goes missing. Frank asks Vernon's son, Walter (Samuel Edward-Cook), to end the feud between them. Henry learns the truth about Connie's connection to Danny. Romance blossoms between Lady Hoxley and Dr Channing.
14	4	"Farewell My Lovely"	Steve Hughes	Joy Wilkinson	10 November 2011
Danny threatens to harm Henry if Connie does not agree to help him out. Esther tells Vernon she had an abortion, while John tells Joyce about his infidelity. Lady Hoxley wonders if she can trust Dr Channing and Finch tries to sell the coins he found in Mrs Gulliver's garden. Walter fights with Frank and is then killed by Vernon, who frames Frank for the killing.
15	5	"Last Days of Summer"	Steve Hughes	Roland Moore	11 November 2011
A face from Danny and Connie's past comes to the village. John's memories return, but Joyce struggles to forgive his infidelity. Lady Hoxley discovers Ellis Harper (Bill Fellows) is a spy and Dr Channing comes to her rescue. Iris learns Vernon was responsible for Walter's death. Mrs Gulliver tells Finch she buried the coins he found. Connie and Henry marry.

== Reception ==
Land Girls surpassed the average audience share for the year in its slot by three per cent and peaked at 2.6 million viewers. The Daily Telegraph reported that the drama was criticised for its historical inaccuracies and the BBC notice boards attracted nearly a hundred comments and complaints about military uniforms and other general historical reconstructions.

=== Awards and nominations ===
Land Girls won "Best Daytime Programme" at the 2010 Broadcast Awards. Later that year, it was named "Best Drama" at the Royal Television Society Awards. Gemmell won the "Best Newcomer" award, with Ward and Webb winning the "Best Actress" and "Best Actor" awards respectively.

== Home media ==
Series one of Land Girls was released on DVD in the UK by Acorn Media in November 2010, two months before the official January 2011 release date. The DVD contains all five episodes of the drama, a documentary about the real land girls and a photo gallery. The DVD was distributed by ABC Commercial in Australia and BFS Entertainment in North America. The Land Girls: Original Soundtrack was released in early 2011, it contains period songs and original music composed by Debbie Wiseman. The second series was released on DVD in the UK on 7 November 2011, while the third series was released in February 2012. Series 1, 2, and 3 were added to Netflix in late 2015.

== Novels ==
In June 2016, Natasha Onwuemezi of The Bookseller announced that HarperImpulse, a digital imprint of HarperCollins UK, had signed a three-book deal with Moore to revive Land Girls as a series of novels. Publisher Kimberley Young said, "For anyone who cheered on the 'Land Girls', these novels get my vote!" While editor Charlotte Ledger stated that she was "beyond thrilled" to work with Moore, adding that he "has fantastic stories to tell on the page." The first novel titled Land Girls: The Homecoming was released in 2017, followed by Land Girls: The Promise in 2018. A third, Christmas on the Home Front, was published in 2019.
