= Hero of the Hour =

- Genre: Thriller
- Written by: Bill Gallagher
- Directed by: David Richards
- Starring: Ross Kemp; Maggie O'Neill; James Hazeldine; Emily Joyce; John McGlynn; Julian Rhind-Tutt; Bill Thomas; Jo Woodcock
- Country of origin: United Kingdom
- Original language: English
- No. of episodes: 1

Production
- Executive producers: Jo Wright; Laura Mackie
- Producer: Joshua St Johnston
- Cinematography: David Higgs
- Running time: 100 minutes
- Production company: London Weekend Television

Original release
- Network: ITV
- Release: 12 March 2000

Hero of the Hour is a single British television thriller film, written by Bill Gallagher and directed by David Richards, that broadcast on ITV on 12 March 2000. The film, produced by London Weekend Television's Joshua St. Johnston, focuses on security guard Richie Liddle (Ross Kemp), who foils an armed robbery and becomes a national hero, but finds his new-found fame cannot appease his guilty conscience.

The film was the first project commissioned as part of a "Golden Handcuffs" deal for Kemp, following his departure from EastEnders and the BBC for ITV. The film pulled in 11.7 million viewers on its debut broadcast, becoming one of the channel's highest rated new dramas of the year. The BBC later reported in 2002 that the film had been Kemp's most successful project for the channel, following a poor start for his action drama series Ultimate Force, which suffered badly in direct competition with Waking the Dead.

An extended version of the film was released on VHS on 19 June 2000, containing footage not broadcast on television, as well an exclusive behind-the-scenes documentary; but has yet to be released on DVD.

== Production ==
Filming for Hero of the Hour commenced in 1999, but was unexpectedly delayed when Kemp was shot in the face during a stunt that went wrong. Although treated at the scene by paramedics, Kemp required further hospital treatment. He suffered cuts to his chest and face after safety glass shattered, and was also hit in the face by the discharge from a blank round. Kemp went on to make a full recovery.

== Plot ==
Security guard Richie Liddle (Ross Kemp) is an ordinary family man with four kids to support. Money is tight and tension is high as his wife Alison (Maggie O'Neill) constantly nags him to get a better job and move them away from their troubled estate. In addition, his eldest daughter Donna (Lara Bruce) suffers from bullying due to a facial disfigurement. There seems no way out, until one dark night an incident occurs that transforms him into both hero and villain. The building he is guarding is robbed, and whilst Richie is trying to chase off the burglars, he comes across a bag of stolen money. Could it be the solution to his problems, or just the beginning of the end?

== Cast ==
- Ross Kemp as Richie Liddle
- Maggie O'Neill as Alison Liddle
- Lara Bruce as Donna Liddle
- Sean Chapman as Franky
- Harry Eden as Brian
- Sean Francis as Jockey
- James Hazeldine as DI Whelan
- Emily Joyce as Sylvie
- John McGlynn as Ken
- Julian Rhind-Tutt as Danny
- Bill Thomas as Victor
- Caroline Ward as Emma
- Jo Woodcock as Jessica
- Julie Armstrong as Caroline
