= Torn (TV series) =

Three part drama

- The two families of Torn
- Genre: Drama/Thriller
- Created by: Chris Lang
- Directed by: Sarah Harding
- Starring: Holly Aird; Adam Kotz; Jo Woodcock; Emma Natasha Miles; Owen Donovan; Bradley Walsh; Nicola Walker; Poppy Miller
- Country of origin: United Kingdom
- Original language: English
- No. of series: 1
- No. of episodes: 3

Original release
- Network: ITV
- Release: 19 September – 3 October 2007

Torn is a three-part original television drama series, which was broadcast on ITV from 19 September 2007 to 3 October 2007.

== Plot ==
=== Episode One ===
The series begins in 1996 with a married couple, Sarah (Holly Aird) and David (Adam Kotz) Hooper, going to a busy beach with their young children Alice, Jasmine (Emma Natasha Miles) and Sean (Owen Donovan) on a bank holiday. After some time three-year-old Alice is accidentally left alone and vanishes when her father goes to get ice cream and her mother fails to hear his cries to watch her and presumes she is with him. A frantic search fails to yield any results, and Alice is presumed dead by drowning and is remembered through a commemoration plaque near the beach.

The series then moves forward eleven years, with Sarah refusing to believe her daughter is dead. Whilst in a shopping centre several miles away from her home, she sees a girl (played by Jo Woodcock) who she believes is remarkably similar in appearance to Alice, and faints with shock. She later tells her husband, who maintains that Alice is dead and refuses to entertain Sarah's theories. Sarah returns to the centre, and after several hours of waiting, finds the girl again and follows her to her flat on an estate. The following day Sarah returns to the estate where she confronts the girl and her stepfather Stephen Turner (Bradley Walsh), and after a physical altercation is arrested. She receives a warning on the premise she does not approach the girl or the family again.

Sarah, however, is determined that the girl (revealed to be called Lori) is actually Alice, and the depth of her belief appeals to D.S. Sally Bridges (Poppy Miller) who takes up the case. She visits the Turners' household where she sees photos allegedly of Lori as a baby and, on the way out, meets Lori and her mother Joanne Taylor (Nicola Walker) who reveals she has finally relented and let her daughter get a tattoo on her upper right arm. Thinking this overcompensation for the "ordeal", Bridges asks Sarah if Alice had any distinguishing marks and is told she had a small birthmark on her arm, supposedly in the same place as the tattoo on Lori. With this information, Bridges returns to the Turner/Taylor home and requests a birth certificate and, after to failing to provide one, Joanne breaks down revealing she kidnapped Alice after becoming depressed having found that she was not able to have her own children.

=== Episode Two ===
A distraught Joanne is charged, however Lori/Alice chooses to return to her home with Stephen and is allowed to under the belief she is over the age of 16. Sarah counters that she is only fourteen, and Lori/Alice is taken from her devastated stepfather and placed in a foster home. Against the wishes of Sarah, who wants her daughter to move in immediately, social services want to integrate her into the new family over time, and ask Sarah to prepare a photo album to help Alice get to know her real family. In viewing the album, Alice begins to remember her former life, and after an emotional confrontation with Joanne in custody, she storms out refusing to accept her emotional apology.

As Joanne's trial approaches she requests that Sarah visits her so she can make a plea for her to protest against her going to prison. Sarah refuses and reveals to her husband that she wants the woman to feel as much pain as she went through for the last 11 years. However, the judge takes into account Joanne's depression and the loving relationship she had with Alice, and gives her a five-year suspended sentence on the provision that Joanne cuts all ties with Alice. Sarah is horrified, as she feels Joanne has gotten away with her crimes and may attempt to kidnap Alice again.

Following the trial, tensions run high in the Hooper household, with David considering an affair with his secretary, Jasmine treating Alice harshly out of jealousy as her position as the sole daughter is threatened, and Sean developing a crush on Alice. Sarah, however, tries to help Alice cope with the change, suggesting she retake her GCSE exams on account of her false age and throwing a fifteenth birthday party for her. At this, Alice's boyfriend passes her a card from Joanne which Sarah finds, compounding her fears over the contact between them. The events spiral out of control when Jasmine overdoses on drugs and is admitted to hospital. There, Alice overhears Sarah and David conversing about the problems which have emerged since she joined the family and, incorrectly believing they were blaming her, runs away. When she is discovered missing, a frantic search begins, culminating in the discovery of Joanne's body at the bottom of her block of flats and, as suspicion is cast over the events surrounding her death, Sarah, the last person thought to have seen her alive, finds herself a suspect.

=== Episode Three ===
Details emerge over Joanne's death and it is revealed she died due to a blow to the back of her neck and was thrown from the apartments posthumously. Alice (who was found at the beach where she was kidnapped), David, Sarah and Stephen are interviewed over the incident, and the police discover that Sarah lied about her whereabouts when she changes her story in custody. She is subsequently arrested and, since David has not produced a verifiable story and is still a suspect, social services decide to place their children in foster care. Faced with the situation David reveals to D.S. Bridges that he was meeting with his secretary at the time of Joanne's death, and is released and allowed to retain custody of his children.

Sarah remains at the police station, however eventually Stephen confesses the circumstances behind his wife's death. Joanne had told Stephen that she was planning on phoning Alice and telling her that they loved her but wouldn't be seeing her again until she was 16 and old enough to decide for herself whether she wanted contact. Stephen was against the idea and tried to stop her calling, but as she got up to walk into another room he accidentally pushed her into a table, killing her instantly. He reveals he stayed with her body until after dark and then pushed it from the balcony to feign the image of suicide. Sarah is released and, on the journey home, David admits he thought about an affair but maintains they were not romantically involved.

Three months later the family return to the beach where the epic began and, in a final act of forgiveness, change the name on the plaque from Alice to Joanne, recognising her as a wife and mother.

== Madeleine McCann controversy ==
The drama was controversial because it was reportedly based on real events, and was criticised because of its similarities to the disappearance of Madeleine McCann in May 2007. ITV denied any connection between the two, insisting that the series had been inspired by recent cases in the United States and had been written and filmed before Madeleine's disappearance.
