= Jo Woodcock =

English actress (born 1988)

- Born: Jo Woodcock; 9 September 1988 (age 38); Kent, England
- Occupation: Actress
- Years active: 2000–present

Jo Woodcock (born 9 September 1988) is an English actress. Although active since 2000, Woodcock came into prominence following her critically acclaimed performances as Alice in the television drama Torn in 2007, and as Liza-Lu Durbeyfield in the television series Tess of the d'Urbervilles in 2008. She appeared as Celia Radley in Dorian Gray, the film adaptation of Oscar Wilde's novel The Picture of Dorian Gray, in 2009.

== Career ==
Jo Woodcock was born on 9 September 1988 in Turnbridge Wells in Kent. She began her acting career in 2000, aged 12, starring in the British crime drama Hero of the Hour as Jessica. After a five-year break, Woodcock's career began to take off. 2005 and 2006 saw her act in both television and stage productions. Notably, she made an appearance on the long-running UK medical drama Casualty. In 2005 she also portrayed a young Estella in the stage production of Charles Dickens's Great Expectations, where she was praised for her "strong performance" by The British Theatre Guide. In 2007 she starred as Alice alongside veteran British actors Holly Aird and Bradley Walsh in the TV miniseries Torn, a role for which she received critical acclaim.

Her appearance in Torn led to a number of roles the following year in such established shows as Waking the Dead, Agatha Christie's Poirot and Silent Witness, with her most notable role in 2008 being in the television adaptation of Tess of the D'Urbervilles as Liza-Lu Durbeyfield. The roles kept coming in 2009, appearing in the new BBC series All the Small Things as Georgia Caddick, alongside Sarah Alexander, Sarah Lancashire and Richard Fleeshman. Later that year she played the character of Celia Radley in Dorian Gray, the film adaptation of Oscar Wilde's novel The Picture of Dorian Gray and also had a small part in the Greenlit Productions TV mini-series Collision, before appearing in another series that brought her attention in the BBC One drama series Land Girls. She played the part of Bea Holloway, and apart from a break in the 2nd series she was in the show from the start until it ended in 2011.

After Land Girls she continued to appear in a number of productions. In 2011 she appeared in only her second film Powder, about a rock band's attempts to emerge in the UK music scene. As well as showing the usual drugs and excess of the industry, Woodcock was called upon to strip off for a dramatic scene. Despite being adapted by Kevin Sampson from his own 1999 novel, the film received some negative reviews from newspapers, such as The Guardian and The Observer. Later that year, she appeared in the anthology series Moving On in the episode "Poetry of Silence", as well as the short film Graceland.

In 2012, she appeared in True Love, an anthology series of five dramas on BBC1 that were entirely improvised. Woodcock appeared in three of the five productions. The following year she appeared in episodes of Midsomer Murders and Death in Paradise. Of late she has worked on a number of short films, as well as doing a couple of voiceover jobs for video games. She then appeared in the horror film Perfect Skin, which was released in cinemas in 2018. In March 2022, she appeared in an episode of the BBC soap opera Doctors as Melissa Benson.

== Filmography ==
Year	Title	Role	Notes
2000	Hero of the Hour	Jessica	Television film
2005	The Bill	Katherine Picard	Episode: "305: No Good Advice"
2006	Casualty	Sadie Achill	Episode: "Happy Hour"
2007	Agatha Christie's Marple	Alice	Episode: "Towards Zero"
2007	Doctors	Mariah Carter	Episode: "Barbie Girls"
2007	Torn	Alice Hooper/Lori Taylor	3 episodes
2008	Waking the Dead	Natalie Brown	Episode: "Skin: Part 1 & 2"
2008	Agatha Christie's Poirot	Jennifer Sutcliffe	Episode: "Cat Among The Pigeons"
2008	Tess of the D'Urbervilles	Liza-Lu Durbeyfield	4 episodes
2008	Silent Witness	Margo Harris	Episode: "Judgement: Part 1 & 2"
2008	Apparitions	Lisa Sengrath	Episode #1.4
2009	All the Small Things aka (Heart and Soul)	Georgia Caddick	6 episodes
2009	Dorian Gray	Celia Radley	
2009	Land Girls	Bea Finch/Bea Holloway	10 episodes
2009	The Well	Beth	4 episodes
2009	Collision	Jodie Tolin	4 episodes
2010	Powder	Ticky Turnbull	
2011	Moving On	Amy	Episode: "Poetry of Science"
2011	Graceland	Emily	short film
2012	True Love	Lorraine	Episodes: "Nick", "Holly" and Adrian"
2013	Midsomer Murders	Harriet Farmer	Episode: "The Sicilian Defence"
2013	Death in Paradise	Amber Collins	Episode: "A Deadly Storm"
2014	Casualty	Eve Devereux	Episode: "The Lies Will Tell"
2014	3 Sides of the Coin	Emma	Short film
2016	Kill Pill	Lou	Short film
2016	Monochrome	Emma Rose	Short film
2018	Perfect Skin	Lucy Dalton	Film
2022	Doctors	Melissa Benson	Episode: "The Kick Inside"
