= All the Small Things (TV series) =

- Genre: Drama
- Created by: Debbie Horsfield
- Written by: Debbie Horsfield
- Starring: Sarah Lancashire; Neil Pearson; Sarah Alexander; Richard Fleeshman; Bryan Dick; Clive Rowe
- Composers: Nina Humphreys (incidental music); Chris O'Hara and Colin Hanson-Orr (choral); Colin Hanson-Orr (other)
- Country of origin: United Kingdom
- Original language: English
- No. of series: 1
- No. of episodes: 6

Production
- Executive producers: Phil Collinson; Debbie Horsfield; Manda Levin
- Producer: Richard Burrell
- Running time: 58 minutes
- Production company: BBC

Original release
- Network: BBC One; BBC HD
- Release: 31 March – 5 May 2009

All the Small Things (alternatively titled Heart and Soul in some countries) is a British television drama, produced by the BBC and created and developed by Debbie Horsfield. Following the lives and ambitions of a church choir and its members, the programme began airing on 31 March 2009 and ran for six episodes. The programme frequently features musical performances from its cast, usually popular music. The programme's title is taken from "All the Small Things", a hit song from the American pop punk band Blink-182.

== Production ==
The initial idea for the programme came from creator Debbie Horsfield's own experience performing in choirs since childhood. She felt it was a strong concept for a drama, based on the varied characters and multiple story ideas. She originally thought of the story as a stage play, but later decided to transfer it to television, citing that a series format would "give [her] more opportunity to go into extra depth with the characters and narrative".

The programme was commissioned by Jane Tranter, Controller of BBC Fiction, and was produced in-house by BBC Drama Productions. Filming for the series started in August 2008 and ended in December 2008. Locations included the Derbyshire town of Glossop, Bolton town centre and Manchester. St John's Church in Farnworth doubles for St Cecelia's, the main location of the series.

The local Sixth Form College (Glossopdale Community College) participated in the filming of the show, and several of the children from its lower school appear in two episodes where a school choir features. Creator and writer Debbie Horsfield worked closely with the head of music at Glossopdale, Chris O'Hara, and its head of music technology, Colin Hanson-Orr. Local Glossop based band My First Hello provided two songs for the series - "I'm Not Your Hero" and "We're Not Supposed To Be Alone". The end title song "Can You Hear Me?", sung by Richard Fleeshman, was co-written by singer Elton John, Fleeshman himself and Debbie Horsfield.

== Cast ==
Promotional photo: (l-r) Sarah Alexander, Neil Pearson, Sarah Lancashire, Richard Fleeshman.

- Esther Caddick, played by Sarah Lancashire, is the church secretary and choir member. She is mother to Kyle, Georgia and Fred and separated wife to the choir's conductor, Michael. Describing her character, Lancashire noted Esther has "very traditional values" and is "hugely generous". When Michael leaves her, Lancashire describes how Esther "just gets on with it" and "deals with it in the only way [she] knows how".
- Michael Caddick, played by Neil Pearson, is the husband of Esther Caddick and the respected conductor of the local choir. When Layla arrives to the town, Michael begins to question his current situation with Esther and where his life will end. He ends his marriage and begins a relationship with Layla.
- Layla Barton, played by Sarah Alexander, is the new arrival in the town. Michael, after hearing her soprano singing voice, makes her the star attraction in the choir and forms a relationship with her in secret, later leaving Esther and his children. Alexander was immediately drawn to the character from Debbie Horsfield's scripts, and describes her as "manipulative" and "a damaged individual". Alexander does not perform her own singing scenes and instead professional Rachel Luxon was brought in to dub. It was revealed in episode 5 that she and Jake are siblings.
- Kyle Caddick, played by Richard Fleeshman, is the troubled son of Esther and Michael Caddick. He is musically gifted and provides much of the inspiration when Esther decides to set up her own choir. He is an avid blink-182 fan and his guitar is that of Tom Delonge's signature Gibson ES-333. Fleeshman had previously performed musically on television, and won reality singing competition, Soapstar Superstar, in 2006. In episode 6, Grace and Kyle decided to get engaged
- Jake Barton, played by Bryan Dick, is the new church curate. Dick, who had previously appeared in several television productions, relished the opportunity to be part of an ensemble piece. Although Jake appears regularly throughout the programme, he is one of the few characters not to be part of the musical productions. It was revealed in episode 5 that he and Layla are siblings.
- Grace Oudidja, played by Ayesha Gwilt. Grace is the Caddick family's next door neighbour and the drummer in Kyle and Fred's band. Throughout the programme it is clear that Grace and Kyle have feelings for one another, but it is only in the last episode that they get together and they both bond over their passion for blink-182 and Kyle's knowledge of Tom DeLonge. In Episode 6 they decided to get engaged.

Other cast members include Jo Woodcock as Georgia Caddick, a keen member of the choir and daughter to Esther and Michael, Jamie Birtwistle as Fred Caddick, son of Michael and Esther and brother to Georgia and Kyle, Clive Rowe as Clifford "Shrek" Beale, the church caretaker, and Annette Badland as Ethel Tonks, member of the choir and a promoter of rules and organisation within the church, and Kiruna Stamell as Phoebe. David Fleeshman, father of Richard Fleeshman (Kyle), also appears as Ethel Tonks' husband, Gilbert "Jabba" Tonks.

== Episodes ==
Episode	Featured song(s)	Featured character(s)	Original airdate	Viewers in millions
1	"All the Small Things" by blink-182	Esther and Michael Caddick	31 March 2009	4.6
2	"Swing, Swing" by The All-American Rejects	Clifford "Shrek" Beale	7 April 2009	4.32
3	"Sloop John B" by The Beach Boys "God Only Knows" by The Beach Boys "I'm Not Your Hero" by My First Hello	Sofija Radic and Nemanja Radic	14 April 2009	4.33
4	"What's My Age Again?" by blink-182	Olive Halsall and Jimmy	21 April 2009	4.07
5	"You Really Got Me" by The Kinks "Aliens Exist" by blink-182 "Nothing Compares 2 U" by Sinéad O'Connor "Love Hurts" by Gram Parsons and Emmylou Harris	Ethel Tonks and Monica Binns	28 April 2009	4.12
6	"We're Not Supposed To Be Alone (Acoustic)" by My First Hello "Nobody Does It Better" by Carly Simon "Ode To Joy" by Beethoven combined with "We're Not Supposed To Be Alone" by My First Hello	Kyle Caddick and Jake Barton	5 May 2009	3.99

== Overseas broadcast ==
Overseas, the series has often been retitled Heart and Soul, under which it was broadcast in Europe on BBC Entertainment in October 2010. In Australia, Heart and Soul was first broadcast on the ABC on 12 September 2009, and in Belgium on Eén on 6 January 2010. In New Zealand, Heart and Soul finished screening on Prime on 7 January 2011. In Finland, Heart and Soul was first broadcast on Yle TV1 from 9 November to 14 December 2012 under the Finnish title Rakkautta ja riitasointuja (Love and discords).
