= Hippies (TV series) =

British TV comedy series

- Genre: Sitcom
- Created by: Arthur Mathews; Graham Linehan
- Written by: Arthur Mathews
- Directed by: Martin Dennis
- Starring: Simon Pegg; Julian Rhind-Tutt; Sally Phillips; Darren Boyd
- Country of origin: United Kingdom
- Original language: English
- No. of series: 1
- No. of episodes: 6

Production
- Running time: 28–29 minutes
- Production company: Talkback

Original release
- Network: BBC 2
- Release: 12 November – 17 December 1999

Hippies is a six-part British television comedy series broadcast on BBC 2 from 12 November to 17 December 1999. It was created by Arthur Mathews and Graham Linehan, the writing partnership most famous for Father Ted, but the scripts were written by Mathews alone. It starred Simon Pegg, Sally Phillips, Julian Rhind-Tutt and Darren Boyd.

== Synopsis ==
Hippies is set in 1969 during the 'Swinging Sixties' and follows the misadventures of Ray Purbbs (Pegg), who is the editor of a counterculture magazine called Mouth (a parody of Oz and International Times), which he produces in his flat in Notting Hill Gate. He is aided by Alex Picton-Dinch (Rhind-Tutt), Hugo Yemp (Boyd) and Jill Sprint (Phillips). Ray is constantly pining for Sprint to no avail.

The series delves into late 1960s culture and involves the characters in various socially awkward situations in this setting.

== Episodes ==
No.	Title	Original release date
1	"Protesting Hippies"	12 November 1999
2	"Hairy Hippies"	19 November 1999
3	"Sexy Hippies"	26 November 1999
4	"Hippy Dippy Hippies"	3 December 1999
5	"Muddy Hippies"	10 December 1999
6	"Disgusting Hippies"	17 December 1999

== Critical reaction ==
The series was Mathews and Linehan's immediate follow up to the hugely popular and highly successful Father Ted. As such it received a significant amount of pre-release hype which viewers felt let down by after watching the first few episodes, as it did not meet their expectations. In general it was badly received by critics but has gained a cult following.

A second series was commissioned, but was never made after Mathews was put off by the negative critical reaction.

Hippies has never been repeated on any terrestrial BBC channels, although it has been repeated on Paramount Comedy 2, the now defunct Play UK, and Gold.

BBC America aired the series in the United States in 2000.

The series was released on Region 0 DVD in the UK in March 2008.
