= Clive Rowe =

British actor

Clive Rowe MBE
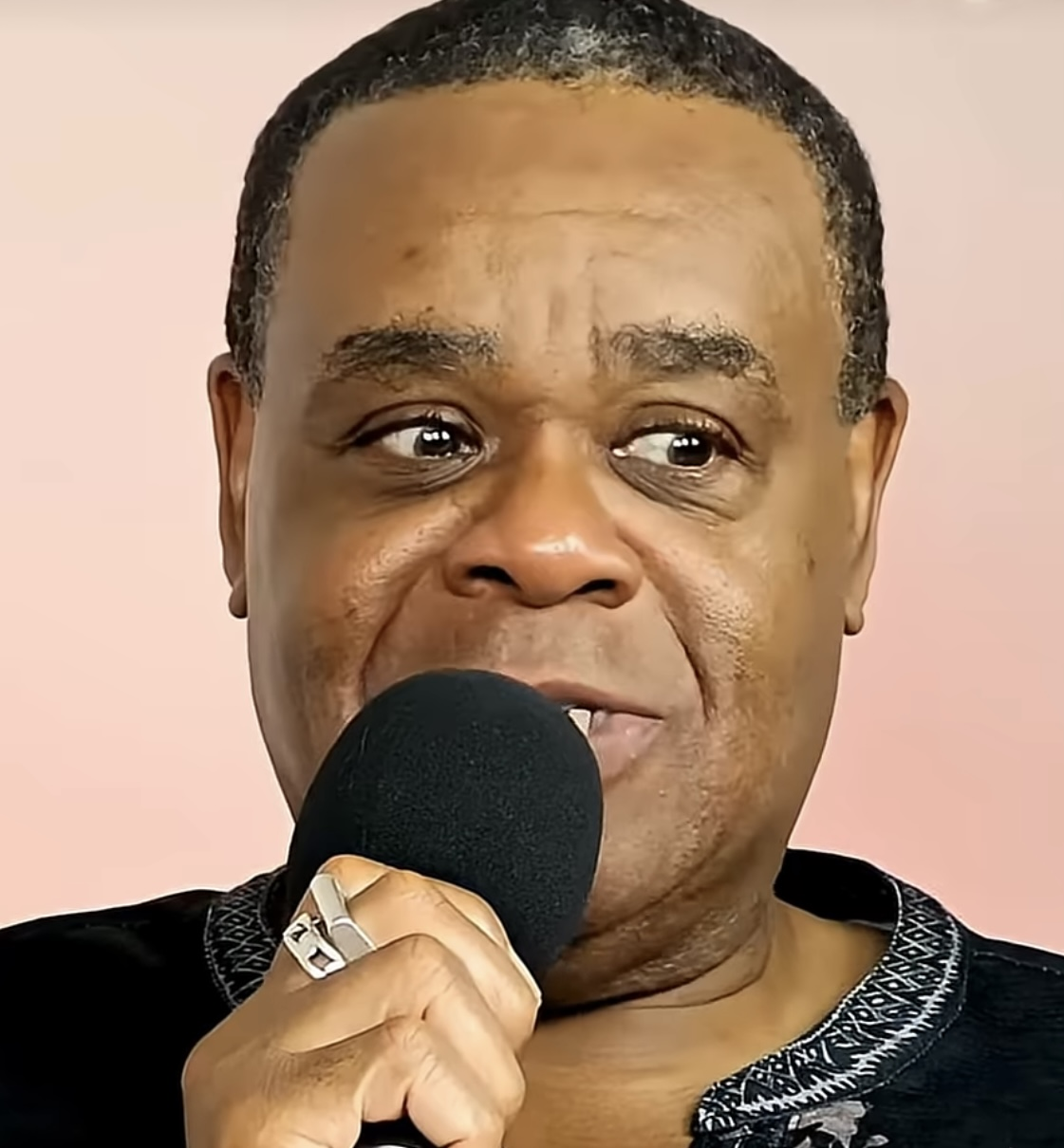
- Rowe in 2025
- Born: Clive Mark Rowe; 27 March 1964 (age 62); Oldham, Lancashire, England
- Education: Guildhall School of Music and Drama
- Occupations: Actor, singer
- Years active: 1989–present

Clive Mark Rowe (born 27 March 1964) is a British actor. He began his career in theatre, and won a Laurence Olivier Award in 1997 for his performance in Guys and Dolls. On television, he is known for his roles in the CBBC series The Story of Tracy Beaker (2002–2005) and So Awkward (2015–2017), the BBC drama All the Small Things (2009), and the Disney series The Evermoor Chronicles (2014–2017).

== Biography ==
Rowe was born in Oldham and grew up in Shaw, Lancashire (now Greater Manchester). He attended St James Primary School and Crompton House School. As a teenager he was a member of Crompton Stage Society. He graduated from the Guildhall School of Music and Drama. He is of Caribbean descent.

== Television ==
Rowe has appeared on television in Dalziel and Pascoe and The Bill, and had a main role as "Duke" in The Story of Tracy Beaker in Series 1 to 4.

He appeared in the 2007 Christmas special of Doctor Who — "Voyage of the Damned" as "Morvin Van Hoff".

More recently, he appeared on the BBC1 drama All The Small Things, portraying "Clifford Beale", a homeless caretaker, more commonly known as "Shrek".

Rowe has also recently appeared in the show So Awkward on CBBC as the father of one of the main characters called Jas.

== Film ==
His film roles include that of "Sammy" in Lars Von Trier's controversial Manderlay (2005). He appeared in the 2017 live-action remake of Beauty and the Beast as Cuisinier – the castle's head chef who has been transformed into a stove. He also starred as one of the football players in the Denzel Washington movie, Remember The Titans.

== Theatre ==
While a student at the Guildhall School, Rowe played Wally Watkins in a production of Lady Be Good, which caused the Opera critic to note "one of two potential stars in the cast" who "sang the title song most winningly and rattled off the acres of daffy dialogue with the aplomb and timing of a Durante". In 1992, Rowe was nominated for an Olivier Award for his performance as Enoch Snow in the London revival of Carousel. In 1994, he appeared in Once on This Island. In 1996, he appeared as Harry in Company at the Noël Coward Theatre. He won the 1997 Olivier for Best Performance in a Supporting Role in a Musical for his role as "Nicely Nicely Johnson" in the National Theatre revival of Guys and Dolls. In 2007, he played the Baker in the Royal Opera House revival of Into the Woods. He was also nominated for an Olivier Award for his role in 2008’s Mother Goose at the Hackney Empire. He was called one of the best Dames in the business when he appeared on BBC One's Breakfast News on 10 December 2009. He starred in the pantomime Aladdin at the Hackney Empire from November 2009 to January 2010 and in Jack and the Beanstalk from November 2010.

He appeared as "Judas Iscariot" opposite Dave Willetts' "Jesus" in a touring version of Jesus Christ Superstar. He also voiced "Audrey 2" in the UK tour of Little Shop of Horrors. He frequently plays the Dame in the annual Christmas pantomime at the Hackney Empire. He also starred as the lion and Uncle Henry in a theatre production of The Wiz, a black version of The Wizard of Oz, in 2011.

In the summer of 2009, he appeared as the Jester "Feste" in Edward Dick's Regent's Park Open Air Theatre's production of Shakespeare's Twelfth Night.

In September and October 2011, Rowe played Osterberg, Monty Python's lawyer in Steve Thompson's "No Naughty Bits" at the Hampstead Theatre. In November 2011, Rowe played 'One-Round' in The Ladykillers at The Gielgud Theatre, London. In 2018, he played Nicely-Nicely Johnson in Guys and Dolls at the Royal Albert Hall a role that in the past he won an Olivier Award for portraying.

Rowe also played one of the debt collectors in The Old Vic's production of Kiss Me, Kate. He played this role in the winter of 2012/13. From mid-2013 to February 2014 Rowe played King Darius in Tori Amos's musical production of The Light Princess, at the Lyttelton Theatre (National). In the summer of 2018, he starred alongside comedian Matt Lucas in Chichester Festival Theatre’s Me and My Girl. In the summer of 2025, he toured in the UK cast of The Addams Family as Uncle Fester Addams.

He toured in In the Willows, a modern, hip-hop retelling of the book of the same name. This show promotes equality by, for example, the incorporation of BSL into the choreography. Rowe plays Badger, teacher of a London state school. He was also in Sister Act as Eddie Souther.

In March 2026, he joined the West End cast of Hadestown at the Lyric Theatre as Hermes.

In October 2026, he will join Don Black's From The Heart revue at the Garrick Theatre.

== Filmography ==
=== Film ===
Year	Title	Role	Notes
1990	Paper Mask	Ants	
1996	Company	Harry	TV film
1997	The Perfect Blue	Flashback Date #3	
2002	The Honeytrap	Clinic Doctor	
2004	Tracy Beaker: The Movie of Me	Duke Ellington	TV film
2005	Manderlay	Sammy	
2006	Shoot the Messenger	Rev. Wilson	
2013	Aunties	Keith	TV film
2017	Beauty and the Beast	Cuisinier	also voice

=== Television ===
Year	Title	Role	Notes
1989	After the War	Black	TV mini-series
1989	Snakes and Ladders	Alabama Zee Montgomery	Episode #1.6
1989	The Bill	Spink	Episode: "Saturday Night Fever"
1991	Spatz	Coach Driver	Episode: "The Poster"
1993	Casualty	Geoff Speight	Episode: "The Final Word"
2000	Harry Hill	Deep South Guy	Series regular
2001	American Voices	Moses Austen	
2002–2005	The Story of Tracy Beaker	Duke Ellington	Series regular, 74 episodes
2004	Doctors	Barry Coombes	Episode: "Look Ma, No Hands"
2004	Dalziel and Pascoe	Vince Kilcline	Episode: "Soft Touch"
2007	Doctor Who	Morvin Van Hoff	Episode: "Voyage of the Damned"
2009	All the Small Things	Clifford 'Shrek' Beale	Series regular
2011	My Family	Nervous Passenger	Episode: "Germs of Enderment"
2011	Comedy Showcase	Paul	Episode: "The Fun Police"
2014–2017	The Evermoor Chronicles	Mayor Doyle	Series regular
2015	The Kennedys	David Palmer	Series regular
2015–2016	So Awkward	Mr. Salford	Series regular
2017	Will	Boxman	Series regular
2021	Midsomer Murders	Derek Sharrow	Episode: "For Death Prepare"
2026	The Hairdresser Mysteries	Lonnie	

=== Himself ===
- Doctor Who Confidential .... Himself (1 episode, 2007)
- The Lesley Garrett Show .... Himself (2 episodes, 2001)

=== Archive footage ===
- Newsround, Episode dated 18 December 2007 (uncredited) .... Morvin Van Hoff
