= Andrew Lincoln =

English actor (born 1973)

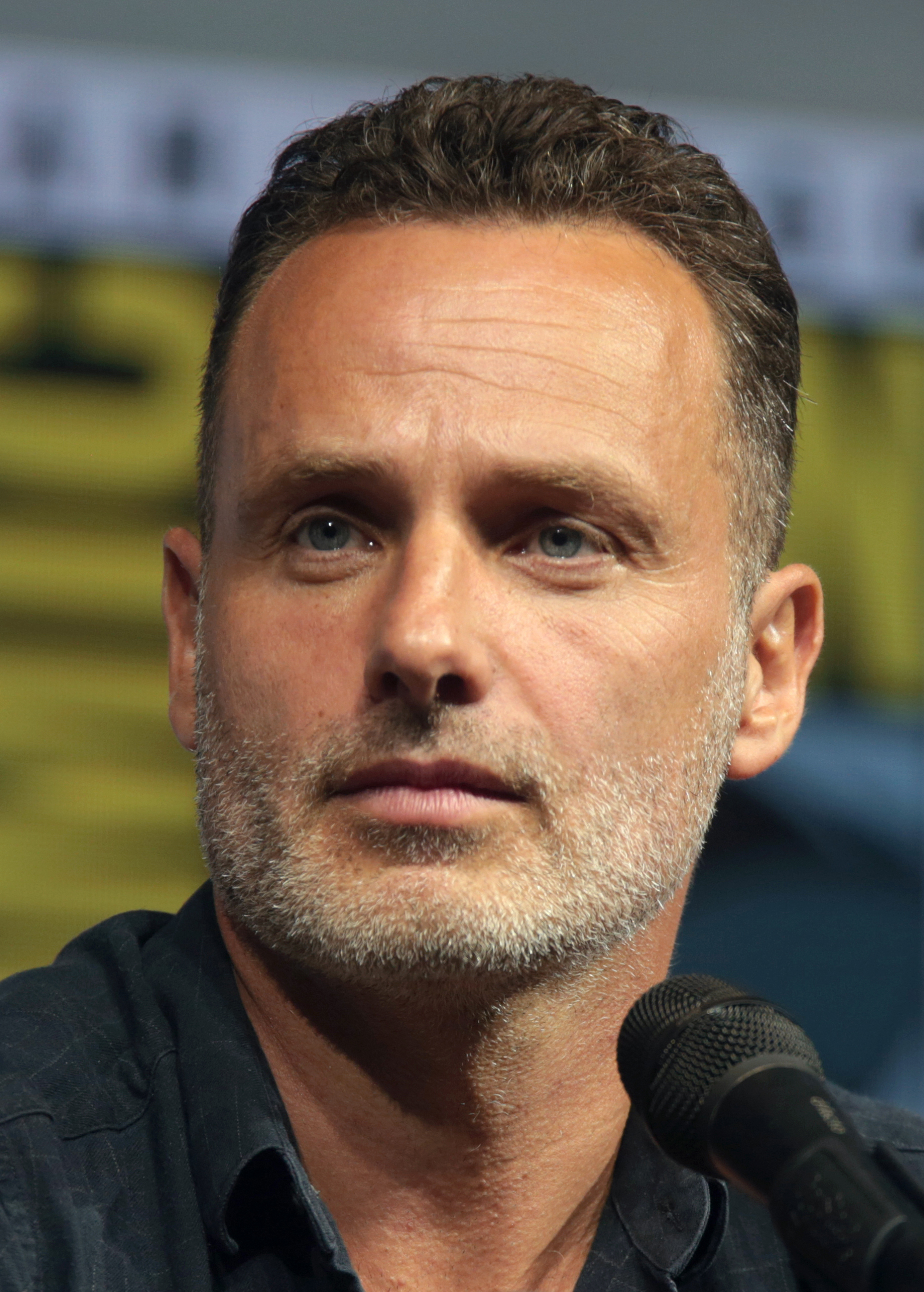
- Lincoln in 2018
- Born: Andrew James Clutterbuck; 14 September 1973 (age 53); London, England
- Education: Royal Academy of Dramatic Art
- Occupation: Actor
- Years active: 1994–present
- Spouse: Gael Anderson (m. 2006)
- Children: 2

Andrew James Clutterbuck (born 14 September 1973), known professionally as Andrew Lincoln, is an English actor. His first major role was as the character Egg in the BBC drama This Life (1996–97). Lincoln later portrayed Simon Casey in the Channel 4 sitcom Teachers (2001–03), Mark in the Christmas-themed romantic comedy film Love Actually (2003) and Dr. Robert Bridge in the ITV television series Afterlife (2005–06).

Lincoln gained recognition for his portrayal of Rick Grimes, the lead character on the AMC post-apocalyptic horror television series The Walking Dead (2010–18, 2022). For his work on The Walking Dead, he won the Saturn Award for Best Actor on Television in 2015 and 2017. Lincoln departed The Walking Dead in 2018, but reprised his role as Rick in the 2022 series finale and in the 2024 spin-off The Walking Dead: The Ones Who Live.

== Early life and education ==
Lincoln was born Andrew James Clutterbuck on 14 September 1973 in London, the son of an English civil engineer and a South African nurse. He has one brother who is 18 months older than him. His family moved to Cottingham, East Riding of Yorkshire, when he was 18 months old, and then to Bath, Somerset, when he was eight or nine.

He attended Beechen Cliff School, where at age 14 he had his first acting role as The Artful Dodger in a school production of Oliver!. He spent a summer at the National Youth Theatre in London and became interested in acting as a career. After leaving school, he studied at the Royal Academy of Dramatic Art (RADA) drama school and began to use "Andrew Lincoln" as his stage name.

== Career ==
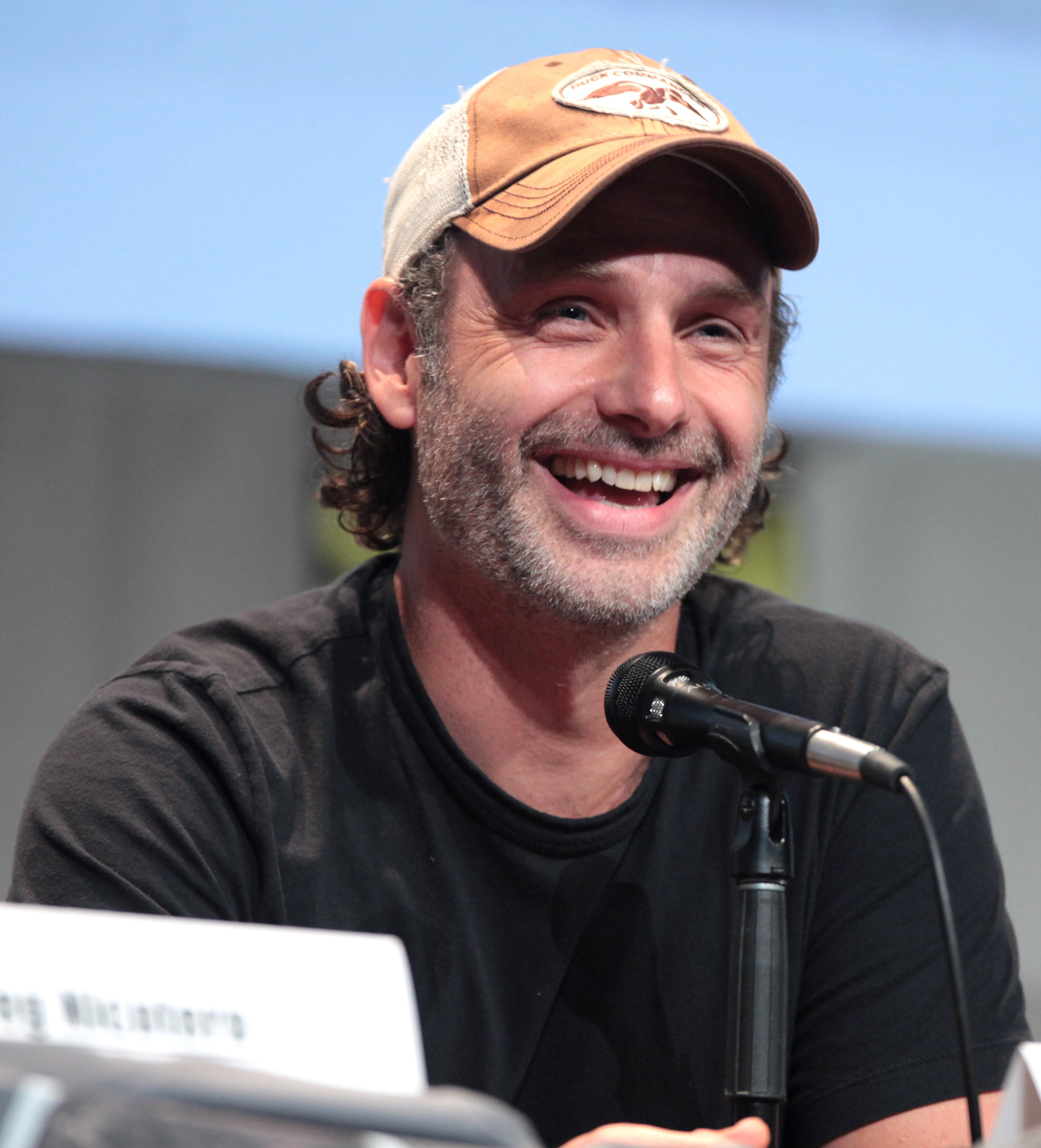
Lincoln at the 2015 San Diego Comic-Con

In 1994, Lincoln made his TV debut in "Births and Deaths", an episode of the Channel 4 sitcom Drop the Dead Donkey. In 1995, soon after finishing drama school, he was cast in his first major role playing Edgar "Egg" Cooke, one of the lead characters in the BBC drama This Life. He went on to appear in British television series and dramas such as The Woman in White, The Canterbury Tales, and Wuthering Heights, including probationary teacher Simon Casey in the Channel 4 sitcom Teachers. He also had a lead role as university lecturer and psychologist Robert Bridge in Afterlife, and starred in the Sky 1 series Strike Back with Richard Armitage in 2010. Lincoln appeared in several films such as Human Traffic and Gangster No. 1 and starred alongside Vanessa Paradis in Pascal Chaumeil's Heartbreaker. In particular, his role as Mark in the 2003 film Love Actually gained him wider recognition.

Lincoln has performed in plays, including Hushabye Mountain in 1999, Blue/Orange in 2000 and 2001, The Late Henry Moss in 2006, the Parlour Song in 2009, as well as radio productions. He has done voice-overs for documentaries, advertisements, and government campaigns. He directed two episodes in the third series of Teachers for which he received a BAFTA nomination for Best New Director (Fiction) in 2004.

In April 2010, Lincoln was cast as Rick Grimes, the protagonist of AMC's post-apocalyptic series The Walking Dead. Grimes is a sheriff's deputy who awakens from a coma in the midst of a zombie apocalypse. He becomes the leader of a group of family and friends who are forced to relentlessly fight off flesh-eating zombies and hostile humans. In 2010, Lincoln signed up for the show for a potential six years and renegotiated a deal for two further seasons. Lincoln appeared on the show for the final time on 4 November 2018, having previously stated that he wished to spend more time with his children. According to The New York Times, Lincoln's role on The Walking Dead made him "the center of one of the world's biggest pop culture franchises". Following Lincoln's departure from The Walking Dead, it was planned that he would reprise his role of Rick Grimes in a trilogy of feature-length films. Due to the COVID-19 pandemic, the films were delayed; they were later replaced with The Walking Dead: The Ones Who Live, a six-hour television show starring both Lincoln and Danai Gurira. Lincoln starred in the 2024 spin-off The Walking Dead: The Ones Who Live.

In 2019, Lincoln was cast in and filmed in the drama Penguin Bloom, his first non-The Walking Dead role since 2010.

== Recognition and awards ==
Lincoln has received various awards and nominations for his portrayal of Rick Grimes; he won the Saturn Award for Best Actor on Television in 2015 and again in 2017. In 2012 and 2015, TVLine spotlighted Lincoln as "Performer of the Week" for his performance in the fourth episode of season 3 ("Killer Within") and for the fifteenth episode of season 5 ("Try"), respectively. Regarding Lincoln's performance in "Try", TVLine said that he "could act his way from A to Z all within the span of a single hour". Jacob Stolworthy of The Independent said that Lincoln's performance in the first episode of season seven is "a moment where Andrew Lincoln excels, his character coming full circle".

== Personal life ==
On 10 June 2006, Lincoln married Gael Anderson, daughter of Ian Anderson, flautist and vocalist of Jethro Tull. They have two children, a son and a daughter.

Lincoln is a Manchester United fan.

He was educated in Bath, where he was childhood friends with former Exeter City manager Paul Tisdale.

== Politics ==
Lincoln has appeared in a video in support of the Robin Hood tax in 2014. Along with others involved in the video he has encouraged the public to get behind the measure, noting its "incredible support from people across Europe."

== Acting credits ==
=== Film ===
Year	Film	Role	Notes	Ref.
1995	Boston Kickout	Ted	Film debut	
1999	Human Traffic	Felix		
1999	Understanding Jane	Party Stonehead 1		
1999	A Man's Best Friend	Man	Short film	
2000	Gangster No. 1	Maxie King		
2000	Fixated	Andy	Short film	
2000	Offending Angels	Sam		
2003	Love Actually	Mark		
2004	Enduring Love	TV Producer		
2006	These Foolish Things	Christopher Lovell		
2006	Hey Good Looking!	Paul		
2006	Scenes of a Sexual Nature	Jamie		
2008	The Pro	(unknown role)	Short film	
2010	Heartbreaker	Jonathan Alcott		
2010	Made in Dagenham	Mr. Clarke		
2020	Penguin Bloom	Cameron Bloom		

=== Television ===
Year	Title	Role	Notes	Ref.
1994	Drop the Dead Donkey	Terry	Episode: "Births and Deaths"	
1995	N7	Andy	Unsold television pilot	
1996	Over Here	Cappy	Episodes: "#1.1" & "#1.2"	
1996	Bramwell	Martin Fredericks	Episode: "The Return of the Betrayer"	
1996–1997	This Life	Edgar "Egg" Cooke	Main role; 32 episodes	
1997	The Woman in White	Walter Hartright	Miniseries; 2 episodes	
1999	Mersey Blues	Himself - Narrator	Docuseries; 5 episodes	
2000	Bomber	Captain Willy Byrne	Miniseries; 2 episodes	
2000	A Likeness in Stone	Richard Kirschman	Television film	
2000–2001	Shipwrecked	Himself - Narrator	Reality series; 27 episodes	
2001–2003	Teachers	Simon Casey	Lead role (series 1–2), Recurring role (series 3); 20 episodes (also directed 2 episodes)	
2003	State of Mind	Julian Latimer	Television film	
2003	Trevor's World of Sport	Mark Boden	Episode #1.1	
2003	Canterbury Tales	Alan King	Episode: "The Man of Law's Tale"	
2004	Holby City	Boyfriend to Hep C Patient	Episode: "Letting Go" (uncredited)	
2004	Whose Baby?	Barry Flint	Television film	
2004	Lie with Me	DI Will Tomlinson	Miniseries; 2 episodes	
2005–2006	Afterlife	Robert Bridge	Main role; 14 episodes	
2007	This Life + 10	Edgar "Egg" Cooke	Television special	
2008	The Things I Haven't Told You	DC Rae	Television film	
2008	Play or Be Played	Joe	Television film	
2009	Wuthering Heights	Edgar Linton	Miniseries; 2 episodes	
2009	Moonshot	Michael Collins	Television film	
2010	Strike Back	Hugh Collinson	Main role; 6 episodes (series 1)	
2010–2018, 2022	The Walking Dead	Rick Grimes	Lead role (seasons 1–9), Special guest star (season 11); 102 episodes	
2011	Dispatches	Himself - Narrator	Episode: "Secret NHS Diaries"	
2014	Tigers About the House	Himself - Narrator	Docuseries; 4 episodes	
2017	Red Nose Day Actually	Mark	Television short for Red Nose Day 2017	
2017	Robot Chicken	Rick Grimes	Voice role; Episode: "The Robot Chicken Walking Dead Special: Look Who's Walking"	
2018	Fear the Walking Dead	Rick Grimes	Episode: "What's Your Story?"	
2022	Guillermo del Toro's Cabinet of Curiosities	Edgar Bradley	Episode: "The Murmuring"	
2024	The Walking Dead: The Return	Himself	Television special; also executive producer	
2024	The Walking Dead: The Ones Who Live	Rick Grimes	Miniseries; 6 episodes (also executive producer and co-creator)	
2025	Coldwater	John	Lead role; 6 episodes (also executive producer)	
2026	Force of Nature	Himself - Narrator	Docuseries; 6 episodes	

=== Theatre ===
Year	Title	Role	Location	Playwright
1998	Sugar Sugar	Joe	Bush Theatre	Simon Bent
1999	Hushabye Mountain	Danny	Hampstead Theatre	Jonathan Harvey
2000–2001	Blue/Orange	Bruce	Cottesloe Theatre (2000); Duchess Theatre (2001)	Joe Penhall
2002	Free	Alex	Loft (Lyttelton Theatre)	Simon Bowen
2006	The Late Henry Moss	Ray	Almeida Theatre	Sam Shepard
2009	Parlour Song	Dale	Almeida Theatre	Jez Butterworth
2020	A Christmas Carol	Ebenezer Scrooge	The Old Vic	Jack Thorne
2025	The Lady from the Sea	Edward	Bridge Theatre	Simon Stone

=== Video games ===
Year	Title	Role	Notes	Ref.
2021	Fortnite Battle Royale	Rick Grimes	Likeness	
2024	Call of Duty: Modern Warfare III	Rick Grimes	Playable Character (DLC); Voice and Likeness	
2025	Dead by Daylight	Rick Grimes	Playable Character (DLC); Voice and Likeness	
2026	World War Z	Rick Grimes	Playable Character (DLC); Voice and Likeness	

=== Podcast ===
Year	Title	Role	Notes	Ref.
2024	A Better Paradise Volume One: An Aftermath	Dr. Mark Tyburn	Main role; 12 episodes	

== Awards and nominations ==
Year	Award	Category	Result	Work	Ref.
2004	British Academy Television Awards	Best New Director (Fiction)	Nominated	Teachers	
2004	Phoenix Film Critics Society Award	Best Ensemble Acting	Nominated	Love Actually	
2004	Empire Awards	Best Newcomer	Nominated	Love Actually	
2007	Golden Nymph Award	Outstanding Actor – Drama Series	Won	Afterlife	
2010	IGN Summer Movie Award	Best TV Hero	Won	The Walking Dead	
2011	Saturn Awards	Best Actor on Television	Nominated	The Walking Dead	
2011	Scream Awards	Best Horror Actor	Nominated	The Walking Dead	
2012	Satellite Awards	Best Ensemble – Television (Special Achievement Award)	Won	The Walking Dead	
2013	Saturn Awards	Best Actor on Television	Nominated	The Walking Dead	
2013	Critics' Choice Television Award	Best Actor in a Drama Series	Nominated	The Walking Dead	
2013	TV Guide Award	Favorite Actor	Nominated	The Walking Dead	
2014	People's Choice Awards	Favorite Sci-Fi/Fantasy TV Actor	Nominated	The Walking Dead	
2014	People's Choice Awards	Favorite TV Anti-Hero	Won	The Walking Dead	
2015	Saturn Awards	Best Actor on Television	Won	The Walking Dead	
2015	Fangoria Chainsaw Awards	Best TV Actor	Nominated	The Walking Dead	
2016	Saturn Awards	Best Actor on Television	Nominated	The Walking Dead	
2016	Teen Choice Awards	Choice TV Actor: Fantasy/Sci-Fi	Nominated	The Walking Dead	
2017	People's Choice Awards	Favorite Sci-Fi/Fantasy TV Actor	Nominated	The Walking Dead	
2017	Saturn Awards	Best Actor on Television	Won	The Walking Dead	
2018	Saturn Awards	Best Actor on Television	Nominated	The Walking Dead	
2018	People's Choice Awards	Best TV Actor	Nominated	The Walking Dead	
2019	Saturn Awards	Best Actor on Television	Nominated	The Walking Dead	
2025	Saturn Awards	Best Actor in a Television Series	Nominated	The Walking Dead: The Ones Who Live	
2025	Saturn Awards	Best Television Presentation	Won	The Walking Dead: The Ones Who Live	
