= Sword of Honour (2001 film) =

2001 British television drama film

- Based on: Sword of Honour by Evelyn Waugh
- Written by: William Boyd
- Directed by: Bill Anderson
- Starring: Daniel Craig; Megan Dodds; Katrin Cartlidge
- Music by: Nina Humphreys
- Country of origin: United Kingdom
- Original language: English

Production
- Producer: Gillian McNeill
- Running time: 3 hrs 11 mins

Original release
- Network: Channel 4
- Release: 2 January 2001

Sword of Honour is a 2001 British television film directed by Bill Anderson and starring Daniel Craig. Scripted by William Boyd, it is based on the Sword of Honour trilogy of novels by Evelyn Waugh, which loosely parallel Waugh's own experiences in the Second World War.

== Reception ==
Commenting in The Daily Telegraph, its Defence Editor, John Keegan, said: "To reduce Waugh's enormous text to a short television treatment presented William Boyd with a daunting challenge. He has met it magnificently... Boyd's compressions improve Waugh's plot. At the literary level, therefore, Boyd passes all the tests. The failure is at the directorial level. Bill Anderson has either simply not grasped or has flinched from depicting how utterly different the Britain of 1939–45 is from Tony Blair's. His lack of grasp or nerve has affected his actors – though some of them may also be guilty of not having immersed themselves in the books, inexcusably, since Waugh is the most readable of novelists. As a result, characters appear either as caricatures or as pale approximations of Waughian realities".

== Filming locations ==
Edinburgh was one of the locations for filming.
