= Perfect Skin (film) =

- Promotional poster
- Directed by: Kevin Chicken
- Written by: Kevin Chicken; Dusan Tolmac
- Produced by: Fiona Campbell; Cordelia Plunket
- Starring: Richard Brake; Natalia Kostrzewa; Jo Woodcock
- Cinematography: Jim Marks
- Edited by: Emilio Rey
- Music by: Dan Bewick
- Release date: 25 August 2018 (FrightFest London)
- Running time: 102 minutes
- Country: United Kingdom
- Language: English

Perfect Skin is a 2018 British horror thriller film directed by Kevin Chicken, starring Richard Brake, Natalia Kostrzewa and Jo Woodcock.

== Cast ==
- Richard Brake as Bob Reid
- Natalia Kostrzewa as Katia Matuszczak
- Jo Woodcock as Lucy Dalton
- Kasia Kołeczek as Magda
- Jemima Bennett as Daisy Reid
- Oscar Bennett as James Reid
- Cameron Jack as D.I Craig
- Sartaj Garewal as D.I Rez Kiyani
- Ben Peel as Customer in tattoo studio

== Release ==
The film premiered at FrightFest in August 2018.

== Reception ==
Michelle Swope of Dread Central rated the film 4.5 stars out of 5 and wrote: "Brake’s riveting performance, the direction, and the work of cinematographer Jim Marks make Perfect Skin absolutely mesmerizing."

Trace Thurman of Bloody Disgusting rated the film gave the film a score of 3.5/5 and wrote that Chicken "has crafted a fascinating character study of a man driven solely by his obsession."

Anton Bitel of SciFiNow wrote that the film "shows the unhappy entrapment and transformation of a Polish migrant in London".

Film critic Kim Newman wrote that the film "boils down to another chained-up-in-the-cellar abduction exercise."
