= List of Bloodline episodes =

Bloodline is an American Netflix original thriller–drama television series created by Todd A. Kessler, Glenn Kessler, and Daniel Zelman. The series stars Kyle Chandler, Ben Mendelsohn, Linda Cardellini, Norbert Leo Butz, Sam Shepard, and Sissy Spacek among the main cast, and it focuses on the lives of the Rayburn family, which owns and runs an oceanfront hotel in the Florida Keys. The first 13-episode season premiered on Netflix, on March 20, 2015. The second season, comprising 10 episodes, was released on May 27, 2016. On July 13, 2016, the series was renewed for a 10-episode third season, later confirmed to be the final season. The third and final season was released on May 26, 2017.

== Series overview ==
Season	Episodes	Originally released
1	13	March 20, 2015
2	10	May 27, 2016
3	10	May 26, 2017

== Episodes ==
=== Season 1 (2015) ===
No. overall	No. in season	Title	Directed by	Written by	Original release date
1	1	"Part 1"	Johan Renck	Todd A. Kessler & Glenn Kessler & Daniel Zelman	March 20, 2015
Danny Rayburn, the family's oldest son, buses home from Miami for his parents' celebration of their 45th anniversary running Rayburn House, a beachside inn in the Florida Keys, and the scheduled dedication of a pier in their names. He disembarks at an earlier stop to avoid his brother John, a detective and deputy sheriff in the Monroe County Sheriff's Department. Instead of going to the party, Danny visits a bar, where he meets an old friend: a parolee named Eric O'Bannon. Eric offers Danny an opportunity to make money. After the party, Danny asks John to talk to Robert about Danny's staying home for good and working in the family business. Robert initially does not want Danny to return home, but leaves the choice to the three siblings. Though John, Kevin, and Meg fear Danny may ultimately break Sally's heart, they decide Danny should stay. However, John lies to Danny, telling him Robert did not want him to stay. Danny becomes upset and decides to cut his visit short. John asks him to stay until after the pier dedication, and when Danny declines, drives him back to the Islamorada bus stop. Earlier, John is called by his partner, Meg's boyfriend Marco, to investigate an unidentified female corpse floating in the channel.
2	2	"Part 2"	Johan Renck	Story by : Todd A. Kessler & Glenn Kessler & Daniel Zelman; Teleplay by : Jeff Shakoor	March 20, 2015
Danny does not take the bus home and instead climbs into Eric's van. Eric and Danny paint gas canisters black and steal gasoline from a local dock. Eric lets Danny in on his illegal business dealings. He tells Danny that they are dealing with dangerous people, but the money is easy. Eric lets Danny stay at the house of his sister, Chelsea. John and Marco meet with the coroner, who determines that the unidentified woman died from drowning despite the burns on her body. Danny is standing on an empty beach when Robert paddles up in his kayak. Robert tells Danny he thought he'd left, but Danny says he wanted to tell him goodbye, with no hard feelings, before Robert dies. Robert laughs it off, gets back in his kayak, and paddles off. Soon after paddling away Robert falls over in his kayak. Danny saves his life and, in the process, reinjures his shoulder. At the hospital the family is skeptical of what actually happened to Robert; Kevin accuses Danny of harming Robert. Sally questions Danny about why he didn't say goodbye prior to leaving, to which Danny replies that Robert wanted him to leave. Sally retorts: "You didn't want to face me." A doctor tells Danny that an improperly healed shoulder fracture is causing his chronic pain and asks how it happened. Danny claims it's from a car accident in his youth. Danny becomes agitated and aggressively presses for a refill for his pain medication. Afterward, Danny quickly leaves the hospital to finish the job with Eric. When John tries to check in on Danny, the doctor alerts John that Danny has left and says she believes he has a prescription pill problem. John immediately becomes suspicious of Danny and asks his colleague Chuck to investigate Eric. Chuck reports Eric had called in sick at work. Danny and Eric have used the Rayburn family boat to move the gasoline they'd stolen to the mangroves. Kevin, still suspicious of Danny, pays a fisherman who'd witnessed Robert's fall to tell him what happened. The fisherman takes Kevin's money but offers no new revelations. As Danny returns to Rayburn House, he is confronted by both John and Kevin. Kevin attacks Danny, and John protects Danny after having a flashback of Robert beating Danny when they were children.
3	3	"Part 3"	Adam Bernstein	Story by : Todd A. Kessler & Glenn Kessler & Daniel Zelman; Teleplay by : Jonathan Glatzer	March 20, 2015
Meg cheats on Marco with her client, Alec. Alec and his attorneys have hired Meg as a consultant to a luxury real estate project in Monroe County. Meg explains to Alec that after law school Robert put her in charge of his estate planning, and she did not do the one thing Robert wanted: take Danny out of the will. Later, Meg tells Alec and his team that the project will be very difficult, if not impossible, to complete due to local politics. At Sally's prompting, John asks Danny to stay home for good, despite what he'd told him days before. However, John imposes one condition: Danny cannot hang out with Eric O'Bannon. Eric gives Danny an envelope of cash and offers him another job. Danny declines, as he wants to continue working with his family. Danny mails the cash to an unknown address. Due to Robert's condition, the siblings discuss who will fulfill his duties at the inn. Sally, despite the concerns of John, Kevin, and Meg, determines that Danny will start work at the inn; he is given several of Robert's duties, including boat charters. Kevin tells Meg over drinks that he and his wife, Belle, have separated, in part due to a miscarriage and Belle's belief that Kevin is unsuited to be a father. Before visiting the hospital, Meg revisits her father's will. She takes Danny out of it and brings Robert a new copy to sign. At the hospital Robert wakes up. The doctors determine that he had mini strokes, but they cannot locate the main clot. Robert exhibits disorientation, including calling Meg "Sarah". Meg determines he should not sign the will. John's son Ben is making a video compilation for the pier dedication. Ben later shows John an old video that is misdated. Ben asks John if the other girl in the film is Sarah, which John confirms. Sarah is the late sister of Danny, John, Kevin, and Meg. Danny arrives back at the hospital to find Meg and Sally, who leave Danny in the waiting room to bid goodbye to Robert. While they are gone Danny looks through Meg's purse and finds a key card to the Sunset Palms motel, which he takes. He later confronts Meg about the card and tries to use it to blackmail her.
4	4	"Part 4"	Todd A. Kessler	Todd A. Kessler & Glenn Kessler & Daniel Zelman	March 20, 2015
John and Marco find the charred hull of a boat and believe it's related to the dead girl's case. Further investigation leads them to suspect that their Jane Doe may be the victim of an illegal immigration ring. In the hospital, Robert is about to be discharged and has an argument with Meg about the filing of his will and testament. Meg asks him again if he has changed his mind about keeping Danny out of his will. After a moment of frustration, Robert tells her he'll think about it. Danny continues working diligently at the inn and begins winning his mother's trust. Meg continues to cheat on Marco with Alec, but in a more secretive manner after Danny's blackmail. Kevin watches a few investors talking to the marina's owner and thinks the marina might soon be sold to an outside party. Danny bonds with his brothers and father at John's son's baseball game, and at the inn, in front of Sally, Belle continues the pretense of being happily married to Kevin. Meg receives an offer to work in a New York firm but declines, citing a personal commitment to her family's business. Marco discovers the place where Danny and Eric stole the gas from and find a working security camera. John and Marco get the security footage, but the video is too dark to positively identify the thieves. Kevin confronts the marina owner's son, Nicholas Widmark, and learns the marina is on the market for sale. Desperate not to lose his livelihood, Kevin says that he will make an offer to buy the marina. Danny and Kevin repair Robert's old pick-up truck. Meanwhile, another girl's body is discovered in the water with burns similar to the firsts, confirming John's suspicion that they both were the victims of an immigration run gone bad. Eric lines up another illegal gas run. Robert observes Danny around the inn and begins giving serious thought to Danny's future with the family. Meg confronts Alec about the offer to work in New York and asks if he arranged it for her. Alec convinces Meg that she impressed the people from New York with her work and got the offer on her own merits. Robert and his sons take a drive in the old pick-up truck which Danny and Kevin fixed. Robert later calls Danny aside for a private conversation and tells him he wants Danny to leave, and never come back. Robert offers him a check to help him start afresh. Danny refuses it and tells Robert that he will leave for "the right price".
5	5	"Part 5"	Jean de Segonzac	Jonathan Glatzer	March 20, 2015
Danny wakes up the day after his conversation with Robert. He begins packing and plans on leaving. Robert returns from his morning kayak trip, collapses on the beach, and dies. The Rayburn family starts making arrangements for a small funeral service, and Sally asks John to speak a few words on everyone's behalf. John and Sally have a late night drink and talk about Robert's childhood. Sally tells John that Robert never spoke about his childhood because he didn't want anyone feeling sorry for him. When John presses her, she reveals that Robert had a very abusive childhood, and she clarifies that he never finished high school because he left home after stabbing his father with a grilling fork after his father had abused Robert's stepmother. Robert didn't kill his father, but he was sure he would if he continued to stay in the house. Tensions run high between Kevin and Belle at the funeral service, and Robert's friend Detective Lenny Potts makes an appearance. Detective Potts was with the local Sheriff's department during John's childhood but had since then moved on. John delivers the eulogy to great praise. Kevin and Belle argue, and Belle leaves soon afterward. Things come to a head between Meg and Alec on the phone, and Meg tells him never to call her again. Kevin, Meg, and Marco go to a bar and run into Danny, Eric, and Chelsea. John sits down with Detective Potts to discuss the case of the two dead girls. Potts points him towards an old case he worked on which had similar elements. John asks Potts why he and his father fell out years before. Kevin makes his way to Belle's house from the bar, to apologize. The two share an understanding embrace. John visits the archives and retrieves the findings of the old case Potts spoke of. In the process, he decides to review the files related to Danny's injury during their childhood. Detective Potts meets up with Danny at the inn and apologizes to him for not doing his job when Danny got injured as a child. He tells Danny that he knew Robert had assaulted him, but he couldn't prove it. He also reveals to Danny that he interviewed the Rayburns in an effort to find the truth about his "accident". John discovers transcripts of the interviews Potts conducted with Danny's siblings as children. However, the audio cassettes of the interviews are not in their cases. Potts hands over the interview tapes to Danny before leaving.
6	6	"Part 6"	Alex Graves	Jeff Shakoor	March 20, 2015
John wrestles with the prospect of talking to Danny about the interviews everyone gave to Detective Potts. Danny's mental condition begins to gradually deteriorate, and his anger towards his siblings mounts. Sally receives Robert's will and testament in the mail and is disappointed to see that Danny has been left out. Danny asks for a few days off from the inn to go down to Key West, and he picks up a substantial amount of drugs from Eric along the way. Kevin discovers that Belle has begun seeing men she met on dating websites. Sally and Meg have a confrontation about Danny's exclusion from the will, and Sally makes it clear that she wants Meg to "make things right". Manny, the inn's valet, asks if Meg can help his cousin with some legal problems. Kevin talks to Susie, the marina owner, and proposes buying the marina from her at a lower price than what her son's customers are offering. However, Kevin agrees to come up with the money in a month, in cash. John meets up with Potts to discuss what happened during the investigation into Danny's injuries. Potts reveals that he did a poor job of interrogating Robert and Danny; he interrogated them together and let Robert feed Danny the false story. When he pressed Danny for details, Danny said he couldn't remember any, and that is why Potts decided to interview the other siblings. He then said that while interviewing John, Meg, and Kevin, he never pressed them about who fed them the same story, and he did not pursue the matter further out of his friendship with Robert and to let the family grieve the loss of a child. When Potts confronted Robert about this later, Robert continued to deny it, and that disagreement led to their falling out. John begins to understand some of the reasons why Danny resented the family. Meanwhile, Manny introduces Meg to his cousin Carlos, who is currently embroiled in an assault and battery case. Meg talks to her friend in the prosecutor's office and tries to convince the attorney to reduce Carlos' sentence. She bumps into Alec and decides to make amends for her behavior. Danny begins doing drugs with a young woman and her male friend at a party. John, Meg, and Kevin debate whether or not they should cut Danny back into the will. John stands up for Danny and declares that if Danny is out of the will, then so is he. After his drugs run out, Danny is abandoned by the girl and her friend. Danny makes it back to town and instigates a bar fight. Chelsea tries to take Danny back home, but he verbally abuses her and walks away. John finds Danny's truck and finds the interview tapes inside. Danny is picked up by a stranger on the highway and taken to a drug den, where he smokes more drugs and has a hallucination. Meg tells Marco that she wants to marry him, but Marco questions the sudden change in attitude and says he doesn't think she's ready. Chelsea and Kevin talk and drink together at a bar. When Danny returns home, John approaches him and tells him he found his truck. When Danny refuses to say anything, John apologizes for their father's beating Danny and for lying to Potts in the interview, because John "just wanted to get things over with". Danny suggests that John and he take a previously scrapped fishing trip and, on the surface, things appear to be getting better.
7	7	"Part 7"	Tate Donovan	Addison McQuigg	March 20, 2015
Sally, happy with Danny's work at the inn, gives him a raise. John tells his wife Diana about Danny's accident, saying that he has apologized and he thinks Danny is fine. Kevin and Chelsea wake up together on a boat at Kevin's boat yard, implying they slept together. Danny and Eric move more gasoline, and Danny asks Eric for his contact in order to ask for more work. Eric is nervous and tells Danny to be content with the work they have. While working on Carlos's assault case, Meg discovers that the witness knew the victim's sister. Kevin meets with the bank to take out a loan to purchase the marina. The marina owner's son confronts Kevin, believing that he is paying less than the marina is worth. Danny receives more money from Eric, which he mails to an unknown address. Eric tells Danny about Kevin and Chelsea's relationship; Danny doesn't seem perturbed. Later, John sees Danny talking with his teenage daughter, Jane. Diana and John are uncomfortable. Sally hears about Meg's work with Carlos, and offers to sign a character witness for him. John and Marco investigate the cases of the dead girls by speaking to undocumented migrant workers. They receive an anonymous tip from one of the workers, which leads them to a church where they find a missing poster matching their Jane Doe. Meg advises Kevin not to go through with the marina purchase, but he believes he has no other choice. Kevin agrees to cut Danny back into the will. Kevin also tells Danny about his hook-up with Chelsea. Eric tells Danny that the docks are being watched and that they can no longer run gasoline; Danny then meets with Eric's boss, a man named Wayne Lowry. Danny returns to Chelsea and tells her that he knows about Kevin and forgives them. At the same time, Kevin is assaulted and beaten by a masked assailant. When Kevin is unconscious, the assailant removes his mask and it is revealed that he is Eric O'Bannon. The episode ends with Danny listening to Kevin's interview with Detective Potts, claiming that their father never hurt Danny.
8	8	"Part 8"	Dan Attias	Arthur Phillips	March 20, 2015
Danny meets Lowry's associate Quintana at a bar, where he offers Danny and Eric more work. Eric hands Danny an envelope of money stolen from Kevin, and it is revealed that Danny was behind Kevin's assault. John and Marco follow the tip about the Jane Doe, and meet her father. He is an undocumented worker who arranged for his daughter to be brought to Florida illegally for $6000, but she never arrived. At another bar, Quintana threatens the witness in the case against Carlos, and the witness drops out. Danny suggests that the Rayburn family hire Carlos part-time. Danny asks Carlos to watch while he unloads some fish into a shed on the Rayburn property; hidden in the boxes are packets of cocaine. Marco proposes to Meg; the family celebrates. Kevin refuses to report the assault and burglary because it will affect his loan with the bank. John brings him to Sally's house, where the family is informed about what happened. The bank's loan officer comes to Kevin's house and informs him she has heard about the burglary; they need to take 90 days to assess the damage. Kevin, knowing that he cannot wait 90 days to purchase the marina, is furious. Danny takes John out to a bar, and John gets very drunk. When they return home, Diana is angry at Danny, who speaks to her threateningly before leaving. The next morning, Danny confronts Meg about being cut out of the will. Meg says that everything is fixed and she just needs to file the appropriate paperwork. Marco learns that Quintana was in charge of bringing Jane Doe to America. Quintana and Lowry meet Danny and Eric, confirming that Quintana intimidated the witness in Carlos's case. Danny and Eric try to deliver the drugs they have been keeping in the shed, only to discover that they are sugar; it has been a test. Wayne Lowry says he will keep in touch. The show flashes forward to a scene of John with a gun, and John's voiceover implies that Danny has made a huge mistake.
9	9	"Part 9"	Simon Cellan Jones	Jonathan Glatzer	March 20, 2015
In a flashback, a younger Sally boards a bus. John visits Lowry's bait shop as a customer, where he meets both Lowry and Quintana. At the police station, the DEA and John's department agree to share the Wayne Lowry case. At the dock, John asks Danny if he is dating Chelsea O'Bannon, and if he has seen Eric, but Danny is not forthcoming. Kevin, believing that the marina owner's son Nicky is behind his assault, beats up Nicky's car with a baseball bat. Danny asks Sally about expanding the inn into a full-service restaurant, but she seems unsure. Danny delivers his first shipment of drugs using the inn's transport shuttle; Carlos helps transfer the drugs to Quintana. At the inn, Danny talks to his niece Jane and explains that he once attended culinary school. (John and Diana contributed financially to his education.) While helping Meg plans her wedding, Sally suggests expanding the inn, but Meg disagrees. Diana discovers Jane has been talking to Danny. While she is working at a plant nursery, Danny approaches Diana and apologizes half-heartedly. He also tells her not to get between him and John, and Diana feels threatened. She calls the cooking school and finds that Danny only attended for a few months. Danny receives another envelope full of cash, which he mails away, unaware that John is watching. John looks up Danny's information in the criminal justice system, and finds an arrest record and a business address in Miami. Danny confronts Meg about her disagreement with his plan to expand the inn, acting aggressively. Nicky confronts Kevin about his car and threatens him with a restraining order. John drives to Miami, where he discovers that Danny had been managing a restaurant which burned down several months ago. At the inn, Meg and Kevin talk about Danny's accident. She is too young to remember, but Kevin tells her that they lied to the police about who hurt Danny. The scene moves to Danny, who is listening to the tapes of his siblings' interviews with the police. John learns that Danny borrowed money for the restaurant and was in financial trouble; his associates burned down the restaurant when Danny couldn't pay. Danny and Chelsea show up at the inn while Marco, Meg, and Sally are planning the wedding. Danny asks Marco if Meg is keeping any secrets; Meg tells Danny that she will tell Marco about her affair rather than allow herself to be blackmailed. Later, Danny and Sally smoke marijuana together and talk about the past; Sally says that she met Robert Rayburn at a bar while he was in the military. Sally implies that she got pregnant, then moved to be closer to his base so she and Robert could get married. John lets himself into Danny's Miami apartment, where he finds several large envelopes full of cash. Sally has a flashback to the scene on the bus. On the bus, it is shown that Sally has a picture of herself with all five of her children. At the end of the episode, Eric O'Bannon is brought in for questioning. John asks him about his and Danny's activities.
10	10	"Part 10"	Michael Morris	Carter Harris	March 20, 2015
At the pier dedication, John's voiceover tells us that he doesn't know what happened to Danny and that he hopes to find out. This voiceover contrasts with a flash forward where John pulls Danny's body out of a truck and through the rain. Back in the jail, John continues to question Eric. The police find gas cans in Eric's car. John and Marco watch the security footage of the stolen gasoline again. Marco wonders who the other man in the footage is; John suspects it is Danny. Sally has a flashback to a time when she almost left her whole family; as she is packing, Sarah knocks on her door. The police release Eric and he tells Danny what happened. Clay, a DEA agent, briefs the police, including John, on Lowry's operation. The police have tapped Quintana's phone. Meg tells Marco about both the job offer in New York and her affair with Alec; Marco leaves angrily. Meg, suspecting that something is wrong with Danny, meets Carlos outside of an AA meeting and questions him. Danny picks John's children up after school without permission from their parents. John tells his children they are not allowed to see Danny unsupervised. Kevin confronts John about the assault case, and John says that Nicky is not a suspect. Sally confronts John and Diana about keeping their kids away from Danny. Clay tells John that Lowry's drug ring will soon be busted. At home, John tells Diana that Danny will be arrested and that he wants Danny out of his life. Danny and Chelsea arrive at Sally's house to find Kevin there. Chelsea leaves, and Danny threatens Kevin. Sally apologizes to John for her outburst; she tells him that she was planning on leaving Robert the day Sarah died. When Sarah knocked on her door, Sally told Danny to take care of Sarah instead of Sally comforting her. Since she is the reason that Danny took Sarah on the boat, Sally feels responsible for Sarah's death. John confronts Danny about Lowry and Quintana and offers to help him reach a deal with the DEA. Danny denies everything, so John throws the pictures of the dead burn victims at him and leaves. Danny asks Quintana if the drug ring also does human trafficking, and Quintana says they don't do it anymore because of some "trouble" in the past. In a flashback, Lowry orders Quintana to torch a boat full of illegal immigrants. Sally asks Meg about the ownership documents for the business, and Meg admits she hasn't added Danny yet. Meg watches Carlos load boxes into the inn's storage shed. Quintana uses his cell phone to start the drug run, alerting the DEA. Danny comes to John and tells him everything, saying that he needed money and didn't know what he was involved in. Danny tells John he has tipped off Quintana about the drug bust. Quintana avoids capture and the drugs remain in the shed. Lowry tells Quintana to go away for a few weeks until things calm down. As Quintana gets onto a boat to leave the Keys, he is murdered by another one of Lowry's associates. Danny says he will continue to work for Lowry; if John continues to oppose him, Danny threatens to tell the DEA that John leaked information about the drug run. Meg discovers the drugs.
11	11	"Part 11"	Ed Bianchi	Arthur Phillips	March 20, 2015
Danny has a flashback to the day that Sarah died. Danny is contacted by one of Lowry's associates. Kevin apologizes to Chelsea and asks if Danny could have been behind the attack, which she denies. As Kevin leaves, he hears Chelsea tell Eric that Danny is looking for him. Eric gives Danny a gun. Kevin confronts Danny about the assault, which he denies angrily. John tells Carlos to get into his police car and intimidates him. Carlos shows John the shed full of drugs. John, Meg, and Kevin discuss the drugs; if they report it to the DEA, the business will be shut down and will never recover. Kevin suggests not reporting, while Meg suggests illegally moving the drugs. Clay tells John that Danny is going to be arrested; John agrees and apologizes for not realizing Danny's connection to Lowry sooner. Danny gives cigarettes to Jane and tells her jokingly that he is a bad influence. John asks Danny to talk to the DEA, and Danny threatens to tell them about John's tip-off. The DEA opens the shed to find it empty. Meg and Kevin have moved the drugs. John calls Meg and asks her to speak to the DEA; she claims that she discovered the drugs, and then called John, who called in the DEA. Kevin transfers the drugs to his boat, and finds the gun that Eric gave Danny. The DEA releases Danny, suspecting he has moved the drugs. John tells Danny the drugs are at the bottom of the ocean, and Danny fears for his life. Lowry learns that Danny never delivered the drugs, and orders his henchmen to do "what they have to do." Danny boards a bus back to Miami and has a conversation with Sarah's ghost. Danny leaves the bus and picks up Jane from school, against the wishes of her parents. He takes her out on the boat, where he gives her the same seahorse necklace that Sarah was wearing when she drowned. Danny and Jane return to the inn, where John sees her wearing the necklace.
12	12	"Part 12"	Carl Franklin	Todd A. Kessler & Glenn Kessler & Daniel Zelman	March 20, 2015
John tells Diana to take the kids out of town until he can be sure they are safe. Marco breaks up with Meg and tells her to accept the New York job offer. Suspecting that the drugs have not been destroyed after all, Danny threatens Meg. When she plays dumb, he tells her not to get between him and John. Danny calls John from a hotel room that Eric procured for him, but John refuses to help him with any illegal activities. Lowry, believing that Danny has stolen the drugs, orders his associate to kill Danny. Danny visits Chelsea and asks to borrow her car. Lowry's associate breaks into Eric's house and beats him up, trying to find Danny's whereabouts. Kevin sees Danny filling up Chelsea's car and threatens him with a gun, but Danny walks away and Kevin does nothing. Chelsea visits John at his office. She tells John that Eric told the henchman where Danny was staying and that Danny's life is in danger. Outside the hotel, John calls Danny and asks if his children will be safe; Danny is noncommittal. John sees the hitman approaching Danny's room but doesn't warn him and instead drives away. He hears police reports of gunshots at the hotel but does not respond. John arrives home to find that Danny is there; Sally calls a family meeting. Danny tells them all that he moved drugs through the inn and that they are now all in danger. He claims that Sally is the worst of them all because she always took Robert's side. John tells the family that he and Danny will meet the next day, and goes to the hotel, where Danny has apparently killed the hitman. Marco wonders how the intended victim knew the hitman was coming. Kevin gives John the gun, saying that it's untraceable and asking him to take care of Danny. The next day, John meets Danny at the beach. Danny says that he sent Chelsea to John to see how John would react to Danny's life being in danger. Danny and John fight about their childhood and the directions their lives have taken. John says he cannot forgive Danny's threats against his daughter, and Danny says he will never leave town. As Danny walks away, John hits him in the head and drowns him in the ocean. John sits on the beach as Danny's lifeless body floats in the water.
13	13	"Part 13"	Ed Bianchi	Todd A. Kessler & Glenn Kessler & Daniel Zelman	March 20, 2015
The episode opens with John still on the beach looking at Danny's body floating in the water. Four days later, a man named Larry tells John he should run for sheriff. Danny is presumed missing and still a suspect in the murder of Lowry's henchman. The marina owners have been unable to sell to an outside buyer, so Kevin offers to buy it for a reduced price. There is a flashback to the day Danny died. Danny's phone rings from inside his pocket, and John suffers chest pain when he sees Sally is calling. John calls Meg and Kevin; Meg arrives, sees Danny's body, and takes John to the hospital. She leaves before she can fill out the paperwork. Kevin and Meg panic when they see a boat approaching and move Danny's body to the trunk of the car, waiting for John. From the hospital, John uses Danny's phone to call Meg, who tells him Danny is with her. Sally asks if John has talked to Danny, and John claims he never showed up for their meeting. John checks himself out of the hospital and meets with Kevin and Meg. They discuss what happened before Danny died and how they can protect themselves. They put Danny's body on ice and store it in Kevin's boat. Kevin and John drive to Danny's Miami apartment and trash it; they are watched by an unknown person. Kevin uses Danny's phone to call John and obscure the phone records. John tells Sally that Danny probably murdered the man in the hotel room and that Danny is scared and wants to attend the pier dedication where he will turn himself in. At the pier dedication, Sally is saddened that Danny does not attend and Belle tells Kevin that she is pregnant. John talks to several officials at a dinner party about the campaign for sheriff; it is revealed that the voiceover for the season has all been part of this speech. John says he hopes Danny knows that he loves him, as a flashback reveals John dragging Danny's body to the boat and torching it. Sally finds Detective Potts, and tells him that she was the one who told all of her children to lie about Danny's childhood injury. She asks him to find Danny. Danny's body is discovered. John is questioned about Danny's last days, but the cover-up seems to go well. Though Marco has questions, the police believe Danny was murdered for stealing Lowry's drugs and hiding them in Miami. One month later, Lenny Potts tells Sally that he has discovered that her children are lying to her. At a Rayburn family dinner, a young man appears and claims to be Danny's son.

=== Season 2 (2016) ===
No. overall	No. in season	Title	Directed by	Written by	Original release date
14	1	"Part 14"	Ed Bianchi	Glenn Kessler	May 27, 2016
John questions Nolan about his reasons for coming to meet the Rayburns. Nolan claims that his mother, Evangeline Radosovich, is missing and that he has nowhere else to go. John decides to keep Nolan's existence a secret from his mother but tells his siblings that he believes Nolan truly is Danny's son. Sally, who has learned about Nolan from Detective Potts, gives John a chance to tell her what he is hiding; he refuses and she leaves angrily. John investigates Evangeline but cannot locate her. His department continues the investigation of Wayne Lowry, and they realize that many low-level members of Lowry's crew are missing or dead. Marco, suspecting that something about Danny's disappearance does not add up, questions John. Kevin, who has been using the leftover stash of Danny's cocaine, almost breaks down to confess to his wife. Marco brings Kevin to see the burned-out boat in which Danny's body was found, and Kevin mistakenly admits that it is possible that the boat was burned purposefully. John questions Nolan further about his father, and Nolan tells John that he and Danny used to hang out at Danny's Miami apartment, to which Danny would send envelopes full of money for Nolan. John also suspects that Nolan may have been in Miami in September, and could have seen him and Kevin planting the drugs in Danny's apartment. Nolan denies this, but upon investigating further, John discovers Nolan is lying. Meanwhile, in New York, Meg struggles to cope with her new firm. She sleeps in the office and gets drunk at a company dinner, embarrassing her coworker. She receives a call from her father's account manager and discovers that he had been sending money to Evangeline with instructions not to tell Sally. The cops search Wayne Lowry's house, but find nothing. Nolan leaves the Rayburn house at night and meets with Eric O'Bannon; he claims John is lying to him. Wayne Lowry calls John, insisting that they meet at night in the boatyard. Wayne tells John to drop the investigation and blackmails him with a tape that Danny recorded before he died.
15	2	"Part 15"	Michael Morris	Carter Harris	May 27, 2016
Wayne Lowry reveals that Danny's tape would incriminate the entire Rayburn family in Danny's death. John returns home and tells his wife that he will run for sheriff. John and Marco receive a call that there has been an altercation involving a waitress named Elena Cortez. The waitress is arrested, accused by Jane Doe's father of being a recruiter for Lowry's human trafficking ring. Kevin meets with a real estate tycoon in an attempt to get money for his marina, but fails in this attempt due to his poor financial planning. His troubles are compounded when his last employee quits. Kevin begins selling Danny's cocaine to a man he met at the tycoon's house; he transfers the drugs inside boxes of pie at a local restaurant. Sally and Lenny Potts visit Danny's house in Miami, where they learn that John has visited more than once and has been lying to his mother and the DEA. Sally finally meets Nolan, and during the frosty conversation she questions his motivations for meeting the Rayburns. Meg returns to the Keys after rekindling her affair with Alec in New York. John tells her that Danny has left a paper trail which will implicate the entire Rayburn family, including Sally, in witness tampering and drug crimes. Meg and John contact Carlos to persuade him to prove their innocence, but Carlos blames the witness tampering on Meg. He leaves with an unseen driver, presumably an associate of Lowry's. Marco and John get a warrant to search Elena's apartment in the hopes of connecting her to Lowry, while John worries that Lowry would release the tape if the police find any evidence. John sabotages the investigation by secretly stealing a photograph of Elena with Quintana, which he destroys. John publicly announces his run for sheriff, and the episode ends with his campaign speech: a monologue questioning why people commit crimes and lamenting the fallen nature of humanity.
16	3	"Part 16"	Jean de Segonzac	Lizzie Mickery	May 27, 2016
In a flashback, Danny receives a gun from a man named Ozzy. In the present, John drives Nolan to a job interview. Kevin delivers another batch of cocaine at the restaurant. As he leaves, he speaks briefly with several policemen. Kevin is then kidnapped and attacked by the drug buyers, who believe he is an undercover cop. When Kevin fails to return home, Belle calls John and Meg. John speaks to Kevin's last employee and learns about Kevin's financial troubles. The police discover the dead body of the man who attacked Kevin. Nolan delivers a note from Eric to Chelsea. At the inn, Lenny asks Sally if he should end his investigation, worrying that he might uncover something painful. Sally says that Nolan may know more than he is telling her. Ozzy picks up Nolan and tells him that there is a lot about Danny that Nolan doesn't know. There is a flashback of Ozzy and Danny robbing a store together; Danny takes a young woman as hostage while emptying the store of drugs. Kevin calls Meg, who meets him at a hotel room. John joins them. After learning the whole story, John tells Meg to keep Kevin in the hotel. Meg misses her flight to New York, and John leaves. Ozzy gives Eric a gun, and asks if there is anything suspicious about the fact that John didn't try to stop Danny from being murdered. Lenny takes Nolan to lunch and asks if Nolan saw John and Kevin in Miami. John speaks to Chelsea about Eric; she says she doesn't know where he is but knows someone who does. John follows Nolan to Eric's hideout and brings Eric to the police station. Wayne Lowry's boss accuses him of shady business dealings when they find out that Danny's drugs are back on the market. Sally and Diana have a conversation, and Sally asks if John is hiding something from her about Danny's death. Diana responds by telling her that Danny had threatened her children, and that he was dangerous. The conversation escalates into a fight and Sally leaves. Chelsea works with John to convince Eric to give them information. John calls Wayne and informs him that Eric will give him up, and offers Lowry a plea deal in exchange for Danny's tape. Nolan gets into a car with a woman who is implied to be the same woman Danny took hostage during the robbery; she is Nolan's mother. Wayne Lowry calls the police department to accept the plea deal. John confronts Sally about her fight with Diana; Sally says she knows that John and Kevin moved the drugs to Miami. He allows her to draw the conclusion that he was protecting Danny, and Sally forgives him. Kevin knows that putting the drugs on the market has caused problems with Lowry, and attempts to fix things. While Meg is on the phone with her boss trying to explain why she missed her flight, he drives away from the hotel with the cocaine in the front seat.
17	4	"Part 17"	Daniel Zelman	David Manson	May 27, 2016
John is seeing visions of Danny. John tells Nolan that his trip to Miami was to protect Danny. Meg calls John to tell him about Kevin. Kevin returns the drugs to Lowry, who sends an associate to chase Kevin down; Kevin runs a stop sign and hits another car. He is arrested for DUI and possession. Lowry returns the drugs to his associates, who give him another chance. Jane Doe's father is told that Lowry is taking a plea deal; when he asks for John's opinion, John says it is the best option. Wayne contacts John to tell him the plea deal is off, and blackmail John into helping Lowry avoid the cops for his next drug run. Speaking with Danny's ghost, John considers confessing everything. Nolan's mother, Evangeline, introduces herself to Sally. Diana confronts John about the trip to Miami, and they fight. Evangeline (Eve) asks Sally for money and tells her about the money she received from Robert; Sally, shocked, dismisses her. On her way out, Eve steals credit card information from a hotel guest. John visits Hank, a veteran and radio hobbyist, and asks him for information about Coast Guard patrols. Sally questions Meg about the money Robert sent to Eve; Meg had hidden it because she thought Robert was having an affair. Marco and John tell Jane Doe's father that the plea deal is off. Meg is fired from her New York job. She gets drunk at a bar, where she embarrasses Marco and his new girlfriend. After getting information from the police department, John tells Lowry which areas are clear for the drug drop-off. Evangeline continues to ask Sally for money, which she refuses. Danny's ghost asks John if he is sure he's doing the right thing. It is revealed that John set Lowry up; Elena and other associates are arrested. John prepares for Lowry to turn on him, but as the cops invade Lowry's bait shop they discover that he has been murdered. Jane Doe's father confesses to Lowry's murder.
18	5	"Part 18"	Dennie Gordon	Chris Mundy	May 27, 2016
Eve and Ozzy share a hotel room. Meg tells Kevin and Belle that Kevin must attend AA meetings but will not receive jail time. John discusses his campaign for sheriff, and gets the backing of Roy Gilbert, an influential local businessman, lobbyist, and acquaintance of Robert Rayburn. Sheriff Aguirre holds a press conference announcing that Danny's murder case is not being closed. John tells Meg and Kevin that Aguirre is trying to hurt John's campaign through the investigation. Kevin offers Nolan a job at the marina. John tells Meg about Danny's blackmail tape, and says he must run for sheriff so he can shut down the investigation. Meg and John meet with Gilbert; Meg is acting as John's campaign manager. Eve meets with Meg to discuss getting money from Robert's estate; when Meg tells her that she and Nolan are not mentioned in the will, Eve is surprised. Ozzy meets John briefly but doesn't tell him he knew Danny. Meg, realizing that Eve might have a legal case, tries to persuade Sally to give Eve and Nolan some money; Sally disagrees. John confronts Marco about the continuing murder investigation. Ozzy meets John again, hinting that he knows about the Red Reef hotel where Danny was almost murdered. Nolan has dinner with Kevin and Belle; there is a flashback of Nolan and Danny working together in the restaurant. Nolan knew that Danny owed money on the restaurant, and once witnessed a man punch Danny for it. Gilbert tells Meg that they need to play dirty to win the election, and hands her a folder of secrets on the Aguirre family. Ozzy and Eric meet up, while John regrets not telling Danny about the attempted murderer.
19	6	"Part 19"	Stephen Williams	Barry Pullman	May 27, 2016
Eve talks to John and Diana about the differences between their stations in life. Kevin receives a letter from the bank about foreclosing the marina, and relapses by taking shots of tequila. Meg learns from Gilbert that Sheriff Aguirre and his ex-wife, Pamela Ortiz, were once involved in a domestic dispute, but no police report was ever filed. Meg asks Chelsea to illegally retrieve Ms. Ortiz's hospital records. Ozzy and Eric fight, revealing that Ozzy has anger management issues. Aguirre tells Marco that the timeline in Danny's murder doesn't add up, and asks him to continue investigating the Rayburns. Eve takes Jane out for coffee; Eve steals a shirt for Jane. Diana gets a flat tire and Ozzy helps her fix it, while implying that John has skeletons in his closet. Diana is unnerved. Belle tells Kevin that she may be suffering from preeclampsia and asks him to wait before painting the nursery. John discovers that Diana's tire was slashed, and runs Ozzy's fingerprints. He discovers that the same woman bailed both Ozzy and Danny out of jail. John, learning Ozzy's location from Eric, threatens Ozzy if he refuses to leave town. Marco and Aguirre investigate the Red Reef Inn, and Aguirre suspects that John was inside the hotel helping Danny. Meg receives the hospital records from Chelsea, and the local media airs the story. Aguirre denies any assault and says that his ex-wife's injuries occurred in a bad fall. Gilbert makes a large donation to the campaign; Meg learns that Robert may not have come by his fortune honestly. At a family dinner, Kevin announces that the baby is a boy, but Jane interrupts by saying that no one cared when Danny had a son. Sally slaps Jane. Meg meets Ms. Ortiz, who tells her that Marco was the responding officer in her assault case, and that he declined to file a police report in return for getting a job with the sheriff's department three weeks later. After finding a note from Ozzy inside his house, John meets him at the Red Reef. Instead of speaking, John attacks Ozzy and beats him.
20	7	"Part 20"	Todd A. Kessler	Lucas Jansen & Amit Bhalla	May 27, 2016
John returns home and Diana sees him washing Ozzy's blood off his hands. Marco confronts Eric about the Red Reef Inn, and says he will pin the murder on Eric if he doesn't give more information. Eric tells Marco to investigate the Rayburns. Diana and Sally fight about Jane. Aguirre tells Marco to bring in Meg and Kevin for more questioning, and Marco tells John as a courtesy. John tells Meg and Kevin to keep their stories the same. Sally asks Nolan to take her to Danny's restaurant. Diana catches Jane looking for her seahorse necklace, and tells her to let it go because Danny was dangerous and had threatened her. Diana has a revelation that John might have hurt Danny. At the station, Kevin confesses to being high when Marco asked him about the burned-out boat. Kevin creates a new story: the boat was owned by Quintana, his coke dealer, and Kevin had lied to Marco about the boat to protect himself. When Marco questions Meg about her strange behavior on the night of Danny's disappearance, she panics and leaves. Diana asks John about the necklace, and he yells at her. Meg visits Marco's house to tell him about Sarah's death and explain her family's secrecy; she and Marco have sex. Meg tells Marco that the reason she was behaving strangely was because Alec was in her house that night. John gives a speech to a domestic violence support group. Diana, upset with his speech, leaves. Eric returns Ozzy's gun to him. Ozzy confronts Meg at the campaign office and tells her about the Red Reef Inn. Diana has realized that John killed Danny, and confronts him. Wanting to maintain plausible deniability, she asks him to deny the murder. John is silent.
21	8	"Part 21"	Michael Morris	Arthur Phillips	May 27, 2016
Sally and Nolan visit Miami, where he tells her about the restaurant but not the drugs that Danny sold to keep it afloat. John tells Meg he beat up Ozzy; Meg says Ozzy wants money to keep quiet. Sally and Nolan visit the house where he grew up; it is currently under eviction proceedings. She sees a photograph of Robert and Nolan; Nolan claims to have only met him once. Meg tells Gilbert about Kevin's financial situation and he agrees to find an investor for the marina. Ms. Ortiz meets with John and asks him to expose Marco; she tells him how Meg broke the abuse story. Marco questions Alec about Meg's story, and Alec reveals that Meg lied. Gilbert tells Meg to pay off Ozzy, and offers to buy Kevin's marina himself. Marco confronts John; he believes the Rayburns helped Danny cover up the murder at the Red Reef Inn. Sally apologizes to Eve and Nolan and offers to let them stay at the inn. Meg pays off Ozzy. Marco questions John again, and there is a tense confrontation in which Marco accuses John of aiding Danny and John calls out Marco for covering up Ms. Ortiz's domestic assault case. In a flashback, it is revealed that Nolan burned down Danny's restaurant.
22	9	"Part 22"	Mikael Håfström	Carter Harris & Chris Mundy	May 27, 2016
Nolan and Eve move out of John's house. Marco questions Eric O'Bannon. Eric says he can prove that John met Danny on the day that he was killed, and requests full immunity. He tells Marco to ask Jane about the seahorse necklace. John finds a farmer's security camera which likely saw him on the way to the beach to meet with Danny. The farmer refuses to let him see the footage without a warrant. Hank helps John hack into the camera system. Gilbert meets Kevin and offers to purchase the marina and hire Kevin as a full-time employee. Watched by Diana, Marco questions Jane about the necklace. Diana calls John to ask him about Marco, but she hangs up when he refuses to answer her questions. Eric picks up the seahorse necklace from a pawn shop. Gilbert offers to funnel more money into John's campaign by hiring Meg as a legal consult for the marina purchase. Ozzy realizes that Eve has left him; he and Eric talk about how to extort the most money from the Rayburns. Ozzy advises Eric not to speak with the cops and to blackmail John directly. Sally tells Meg that Gilbert and Robert were not friends, and that he is a bad person. Despite Meg's new objections, Kevin sells the marina to Gilbert. Hank delivers the security footage to John. John leaks the information about Marco to internal affairs, which begin an investigation. In a flashback, we see Eric speaking with Danny on the beach on the day of Danny's death. Later, he returns to the beach and finds the seahorse necklace. Meg sees Eve talking to Ozzy, but Sally refuses to believe her and says that Eve and Nolan are family. John breaks into Marco's office and finds the request for Eric's immunity. While reviewing the security footage, John discovers that he, Meg, Kevin, and Eric can all be placed at the scene of the murder.
23	10	"Part 23"	Daniel Zelman	David Manson & Glenn Kessler	May 27, 2016
John admits to Diana that he and the family are not safe. She tells him to not come home that night. After promising Eric immunity, Marco discovers the security footage that shows John, Meg, Kevin, and Eric at the scene of Danny's murder. Ozzy meets Sally at the inn, wanting to speak with Eve. In a flashback, Danny, Robert, and Nolan have dinner together, and Danny asks Robert for more money to support his son. Robert gives Danny an ultimatum; he will give him the money for his restaurant or his son. Eve tells Sally that he ultimately chose Nolan. Ozzy confronts Eric at his mother's house, interrogating him about the Rayburns. This leads to a hostile standoff between Ozzy, Eric, and Chelsea, who tells Ozzy to leave. John, who watched the scene, tells Chelsea that a neighbor reported the incident and asks her to go to the police station to make a statement to the police. Marco is questioned by Internal Affairs, shortly after Ms. Ortiz ends the investigation, calling it a misunderstanding. John, Meg, and Kevin learn that Marco can get a statement from Eric which implicates all of them in Danny's death. After a heated argument, Meg and Kevin turn on John. That night, John breaks into Ozzy's car and steals a gun. Gilbert is shown listening to the incriminating tape that Danny gave to Lowry. Meg admits to Marco that she leaked that information about Aguirre, and he cuts ties with her. In a flashback, Danny, released from jail, is about to leave Miami to visit the Rayburns and gives Nolan the key to his apartment. He tells his son to take good care of himself before leaving. In the present, Nolan is crying and blames himself for his father's death; Diana assures him that it is not his fault. Gilbert's henchman arrives at the Red Reef and takes Ozzy with him. John takes Eric to a shack where he attempts to make a deal with him. After Eric blames John for Danny's death, John points the gun at Eric's face. However, he is unable to pull the trigger and leaves Eric at the shack, telling him to go ahead and tell his story. Meg drops Kevin off at Marco's to tell him everything while she goes to the inn. After Kevin tells Marco that John killed Danny, Marco tells Kevin that he, John and Meg are going to prison. Kevin then beats him to death with a dolphin statuette. Meg cries in Sally's arms, telling her that there is something she needs to know. Meanwhile, John drives away from the Keys as a hallucination of Danny tells him to just keep driving.

=== Season 3 (2017) ===
No. overall	No. in season	Title	Directed by	Written by	Original release date
24	1	"Part 24"	Todd A. Kessler	Todd A. Kessler	May 26, 2017
John totals his car after hitting an alligator. He declines a ride home from a fellow officer, and hitchhikes to a bus station. Kevin returns to Marco's house to see if he can wake him, hiding when Meg pulls up. John arrives at the bus station and declines all of his family member's calls. Ozzy escapes from his kidnappers, killing one and letting the other go. Kevin returns to the marina to hide the murder weapon, where he sees Roy's men unloading drug supplies. At first, Gilbert is furious, but promises to help Kevin when he learns what has happened. Meg, unable to find Kevin or John, finds Chelsea O'Bannon at a bar; they drink together. Meg Rayburn drunkenly drives herself home, John gets a bus out of town, and Eric O’Bannon stumbles upon Marco's body.
25	2	"Part 25"	Mikael Håfström	Hans Tobeason	May 26, 2017
Kevin goes back to Marco's house and meets Jim Schakowsky, the local coroner. Schakowsky works for Gilbert. Schakowsky goes over the night in question with Kevin. Kevin sweated and urinated in Marco's house, so his DNA covers the crime scene. Jim orders Kevin to retrieve the murder weapon, and they also notice that Eric O'Bannon has called and texted Marco. On the way back from retrieving the weapon, Kevin panics and calls John again. John is going to ignore the call, but another passenger on the bus answers the phone anyway. John orders Kevin to stay exactly where he is. John learns that Sally knows what has happened, but Meg is still in the dark. Kevin, unable to remain still, returns to Schakowsky. They decide to frame Eric for Marco's murder. Meanwhile, Eric attempts to leave the Keys but a roadblock forces him to turn around. He returns home to gather supplies, while ignoring his sick mother. Schakowsky decides to shoot Kevin in order to make the scene realistic, but Kevin tries to avoid the bullets, resulting in a potential fatal stomach wound. Schakowsky calls 911 with Kevin's phone as Kevin passes out. John arrives at the mile marker where he told Kevin to wait, but no one is there. He receives a call directing him to Marco's apartment, and arrives to see Kevin wheeled into an ambulance. Sally wants to talk to Roy, knowing he is responsible for Kevin's injuries. John locates Meg, but she is passed out drunk and cannot be woken. No one can find Roy. Sally tells her son that she knows everything, including that John killed Danny. As Kevin fights for his life, Eric speeds off on a boat, and John promises he will do his best to cover up Kevin's actions.
26	3	"Part 26"	Mario Van Peebles	David Manson	May 26, 2017
The police search for Eric O'Bannon. John locates Eric with help from Chelsea. Meg has several flashbacks, including a family dinner with Marco and the moment she first met him. Aguirre interrogates Kevin in the hospital and notices a few inconsistencies with his story. Shakowski gives John the gun that shot Kevin. Sally yells at Roy for initiating a plan that includes shooting her son. Meg is furious at Kevin; she saw Marco's body and knows what her brother did. Sally goes to a priest to confess, but does not reveal the truth about Marco's murder. John gives Eric the gun, pretending that he wants Eric to have it for his own protection. Eric is captured while holding the gun. Though Meg dislikes boats, she takes a boat alone into the ocean as she reminisces about Marco.
27	4	"Part 27"	Mikael Håfström	Bill Cain	May 26, 2017
Eric O'Bannon is in jail. Meg skips Marco's funeral while John speaks on behalf of the department. Five months later, John and Diana are separated, Kevin and Belle had their baby, and Meg is missing. Roy Gilbert convinces Kevin to sign a letter petitioning for Eric to be allowed to attend his mother's funeral. John is suspicious of Roy's letter. Roy continually gives Kevin more responsibilities, despite the suspicions of Kevin's staff. Roy tells John that Ozzy, who is doing a short prison sentence, will be getting out soon. John doesn't trust Roy, but Roy insists that he's on the Rayburn family's side. Kevin and Belle plan their son's christening party. John's new police partner flirts with him, but he rebuffs her advances. John has a dream of Eric getting shot at his mother’s funeral. John attends the funeral, but the prison guards drive so slowly that Eric cannot attend. John skips the christening to do this, and Roy stands in as godfather. Chelsea tells John that a paparazzi van was at the cemetery to take pictures, but John suspects it was an attempted assassin. It is revealed that John paid the driver to prevent Eric from attending the funeral.
28	5	"Part 28"	Mario Van Peebles	Arthur Phillips	May 26, 2017
Eric considers taking a plea deal for 30 years in prison. Marco's parents think it isn't enough. Chelsea O'Bannon ignores her brother because of the way he treated their dying mother, and is harassed by a police officer because of her association with Eric. Encouraged by Eric's lawyer, Chelsea tells Eric to reject the plea deal. Kevin helps smuggle Cuban drug dealers for Roy. Sally encourages Marco's mother to take the plea deal. Janie skips a family therapy session to meet Nolan, while Diana tells John she is seeing another man. The Cubans cause trouble for Kevin by illegally killing a marlin and then starting a fight in a bar. John sleeps with his partner. He then gets a call about the bar fight; the bartender tells him that Kevin was there, but she didn't tell the cops for fear of getting him in trouble. Roy tells John that Eric rejected the plea deal. John catches Kevin as he returns from ferrying the Cubans home. The two fight and Sally breaks it up.
29	6	"Part 29"	Mikael Håfström	Ashlin Halfnight	May 26, 2017
Eric's trial begins. John catches Kevin practicing his testimony and orders him to put away the script before it becomes evidence. Nolan offers Chelsea money to help with Eric's defense, but she turns him down. Sally refuses to take Nolan's money as well. Kevin learns from his dentist that he'll need a root canal due his cocaine use. Kevin is in pain but unable to take medication for fear he'll contradict himself in court. Chelsea tells John that her brother is falling apart and shows him a photo of Danny and Eric from when they were younger. John claims not to remember the photo. Later, Chelsea shows the photo to Eric, revealing that she ripped off a third person in the shot, a young John Rayburn. John begins testifying. During a break, retired detective Lenny Potts tells John that the trial may be his last chance to come clean. Eric's defense counsel reveals inconsistencies in John's story. As Sally confesses to her priest, Chelsea gives a deposition about where she was the night of Marco's murder, saying that she drove Meg to Marco's house. The defense counsellor attempts to prove that Meg killed Marco.
30	7	"Part 30"	Michael Apted	Dani Vetere	May 26, 2017
Sally tells John where to find Meg. Meg has changed her name to Amy and created a new life for herself, telling her friends that her parents are dead. Kevin begins testifying. The defense attorney claims that the Rayburns have a history of covering up for each other, such as when they lied about Danny being hit by a car. Belle realizes that Kevin is lying on the stand, and speaks to Diana about her suspicions. Sally speaks to an apparition of her dead mother and decides to testify. She tells the truth about covering up Robert beating Danny. She also says that she had no other choice, and that Meg was with her the night Marco died. Chelsea is fired from the hospital for stealing Percocet, rendering her testimony useless. Eric pleads guilty.
31	8	"Part 31"	David Manson	Melanie Hoopes	May 26, 2017
Ozzy confronts Sally at the inn and tells her to confess. Ozzy is unable to speak to John at the police station, so he asks Roy Gilbert for a meeting. Two of his henchmen try to pick up Ozzy, who commits suicide rather than be tortured. John gets a visit from an old friend and former cop named Mike Gallagher, who used to visit every year. John is paranoid, especially when Mike mentions O'Bannon. John later sees Mike at the police station, but Aguirre denies having seen him. Roy offers to put Kevin in charge of a new marina if Kevin completes a deal with the Cubans. Belle confronts Kevin and says that she'll leave if he doesn’t tell her the truth; Kevin tells her everything. Later, Kevin negotiates a deal with the Cubans that will pay for the marina, but Roy has a heart attack, which means Kevin will have to handle everything on his own. The next morning, one of the Cubans confronts Kevin; there is a mole inside the operation. It is revealed that another Cuban, Nicholas, is a DEA agent. Mike and his wife have dinner with Diana and John. John confronts Mike about Aguirre's lie. Mike says he wants Aguirre to come work with him in Boston and neither wanted anyone to know yet. In a closing scene, John imagines drowning in a diving accident.
32	9	"Part 32"	Mikael Håfström	Bill Cain & Arthur Phillips & Hans Tobeason	May 26, 2017
John experiences a series of delusions and memories involving the deaths of various family members at various times. John wakes up on a chaise longue on the beach. It is revealed that John did almost die while diving, but Mike saved him.
33	10	"Part 33"	Todd A. Kessler	Todd A. Kessler & David Manson	May 26, 2017
One of the Cubans threatens Kevin; if Kevin can't get him back to Cuba, the criminal will kill his family. As John tells Eric that he's finally ready to confess, Sally prepares to sell the Inn. She tells John that Nolan wants to talk to him about Danny. Kevin attempts suicide, but Belle convinces him to put the gun down, saying that John will fix everything. Diana tells John that she got a new home for herself and the kids. Sally tells Janie and Ben that she's selling the Inn and splitting the money between her grandchildren. John tells the DEA that Kevin will testify against Roy in exchange for immunity. Kevin refuses to turn himself in and tries to talk to Roy, only to find out that he has died. John arrives at the inn to find Sally drunk and depressed; she cannot sell the inn because of rising sea levels, and it will be worthless in ten years when it's all underwater. Sally blames herself for her children's lives. John tells the agents that Kevin will turn himself in. After entering Kevin's house, they find no one there. John calls Kevin on speakerphone, but he says that he is halfway to Cuba, where he cannot be extradited. The Coast Guard quickly catches up with the boat, but it's a trick: Kevin and Belle are actually headed to the Bahamas, and the Coast Guard captured the Cuban criminal instead. It is revealed that John helped Kevin and Belle escape with their son. However, Belle forgot to turn off her phone's GPS, and Kevin is arrested. John tries to confess everything to Aguirre, who refuses to listen. John sees a vision of an adult Danny, who tells him to confess to Nolan, and a young Danny, who tells him not to break Nolan's heart. John meets Nolan at a dock at the inn. The two stare at each other.
