= Writers Guild of America Award for Television: New Series =

Annual television award

- Awarded for: Outstanding Writing for a New Series
- Country: United States
- Presented by: Writers Guild of America
- First award: 2006
- Currently held by: The Pitt (2025)
- Website: www.wga.org

The Writers Guild of America Award for Television: Best Written New Series is an award presented by the Writers Guild of America to the writers of the best new television series of the season. It has been awarded since the 58th Annual Writers Guild of America Awards in 2006. The year indicates when each season aired. The winners are highlighted in gold.

== Winners and nominees ==
=== 2000s ===
Year	Program	Writer(s)	Network
2005 (58th)
2005 (58th)	Grey's Anatomy	Zoanne A. Clack, Ann Hamilton, Kip Koenig, Stacy McKee, James Parriott, Tony Phelan, Joan Rater, Shonda Rhimes, Mimi Schmir, Gabrielle Stanton, Krista Vernoff, Harry Werksman	ABC
2005 (58th)	Everybody Hates Chris	Aron Abrams, Rodney Barnes, Craig DiGregorio, Alyson Fouse, Howard Gewirtz, Ali LeRoi, Courtney Lilly, Chris Rock, Gregory Thompson, Kriss Turner	UPN
2005 (58th)	My Name Is Earl	Barbie Adler, Bobby Bowman, Vali Chandrasekaran, J. B. Cook, Brad Copeland, Victor Fresco, Greg Garcia, John Hoberg, Kat Likkel, Mike Pennie, Tim Stack, Hilary Winston, Danielle Sanchez-Witzel	NBC
2005 (58th)	The Office	Jennifer Celotta, Greg Daniels, Lee Eisenberg, Ricky Gervais, Mindy Kaling, Paul B. Lieberstein, Stephen Merchant, B. J. Novak, Michael Schur, Gene Stupnitsky, Larry Wilmore	NBC
2005 (58th)	Rome	Alexandra Cunningham, David Frankel, Bruno Heller, Adrian Hodges, William MacDonald, John Milius	HBO
2006 (59th)
2006 (59th)	Ugly Betty	Veronica Becker, Oliver Goldstick, Silvio Horta, Sarah Kucserka, Sheila R. Lawrence, Cameron Litvack, Myra Jo Martino, Jim Parriott, Marco Pennette, Dailyn Rodriguez, Donald Todd	ABC
2006 (59th)	30 Rock	Brett Baer, Jack Burditt, Kay Cannon, Robert Carlock, Tina Fey, Dave Finkel, Daisy Gardner, Donald Glover, Matt Hubbard, John Riggi	NBC
2006 (59th)	Friday Night Lights	Peter Berg, Bridget Carpenter, Kerry Ehrin, Carter Harris, Elizabeth Heldens, David Hudgins, Jason Katims, Patrick Massett, Andy Miller, Aaron Rahsaan Thomas, John Zinman	NBC
2006 (59th)	Heroes	Jesse Alexander, Adam Armus, Natalie Chaidez, Aron Eli Coleite, Kay Foster, Bryan Fuller, Michael J. Green, Chuck Kim, Tim Kring, Jeph Loeb, Joe Pokaski	NBC
2006 (59th)	Studio 60 on the Sunset Strip	Eli Attie, Christina Kiang Booth, Jessica Brickman, Dana Calvo, Mark Goffman, David M. Handelman, Cinque Henderson, Mark McKinney, Melissa Myers, Aaron Sorkin, Amy Turner	NBC
2007 (60th)
2007 (60th)	Mad Men	Lisa Albert, Bridget Bedard, Andre Jacquemetton, Maria Jacquemetton, Tom Palmer, Chris Provenzano, Robin Veith, Matthew Weiner	AMC
2007 (60th)	Damages	Jeremy Doner, Mark Fish, Davey Holmes, Glenn Kessler, Todd A. Kessler, Willie Reale, Adam Stein, Aaron Zelman, Daniel Zelman	FX
2007 (60th)	Flight of the Conchords	Damon Beesley, James Bobin, Jemaine Clement, Eric Kaplan, Bret McKenzie, Iain Morris, Duncan Sarkies, Paul Simms, Taika Waititi	HBO
2007 (60th)	Pushing Daisies	Chad Gomez Creasey, Dara Resnick Creasey, Bryan Fuller, Abby Gewanter, Jim Danger Gray, Lisa Joy, Kath Lingenfelter, Rina Mimoun, Jack Monaco, Scott Nimerfro, Peter Ocko	ABC
2007 (60th)	The Sarah Silverman Program	Dan Fybel, Rich Rinaldi, Rob Schrab, Jon Schroeder, Sarah Silverman, Dan Sterling, Harris Wittels	Comedy Central
2008 (61st)
2008 (61st)	In Treatment	Rodrigo Garcia, Bryan Goluboff, Davey Holmes, William Merritt Johnson, Amy Lippman, Sarah Treem	HBO
2008 (61st)	Breaking Bad	Vince Gilligan, Peter Gould, Patty Lin, George Mastras, J Roberts	AMC
2008 (61st)	Fringe	J. J. Abrams, Jason Cahill, Julia Cho, David H. Goodman, Felicia Henderson, Brad Caleb Kane, Alex Kurtzman, Darin Morgan, J. R. Orci, Roberto Orci, Jeff Pinkner, Zack Whedon	Fox
2008 (61st)	Life on Mars	Josh Appelbaum, André Nemec, Scott Rosenberg, Becky Hartman Edwards, David Wilcox, Adele Lim, Bryan Oh, Tracy McMillan, Sonny Postiglione, Phil M. Rosenberg, Meredith Averill	ABC
2008 (61st)	True Blood	Alan Ball, Brian Buckner, Raelle Tucker, Alexander Woo, Nancy Oliver, Chris Offutt	HBO
2009 (62nd)
2009 (62nd)	Modern Family	Paul Corrigan, Sameer Gardezi, Joe Lawson, Steven Levitan, Christopher Lloyd, Dan O'Shannon, Brad Walsh, Caroline Williams, Bill Wrubel, Danny Zuker	ABC
2009 (62nd)	Glee	Ian Brennan, Brad Falchuk, Ryan Murphy	Fox
2009 (62nd)	The Good Wife	Angela Amato Velez, Corinne Brinkerhoff, Ted Humphrey, Dee Johnson, Todd Ellis Kessler, Michelle King, Robert King	CBS
2009 (62nd)	Hung	Colette Burson, Ellie Herman, Emily Kapnek, Brett C. Leonard, Dmitry Lipkin, Angela Robinson	HBO
2009 (62nd)	Nurse Jackie	Taii K. Austin, Liz Brixius, Rick Cleveland, Evan Dunsky, Nancy Fichman, Liz Flahive, Jennifer Hoppe, Mark Hudis, John Hilary Shepherd, Linda Wallem, Christine Zander	Showtime

=== 2010s ===
Year	Program	Writer(s)	Network
2010 (63rd)
2010 (63rd)	Boardwalk Empire	Meg Jackson, Lawrence Konner, Howard Korder, Steve Kornacki, Margaret Nagle, Tim Van Patten, Paul Simms, Terence Winter	HBO
2010 (63rd)	Justified	Dave Andron, Wendy Calhoun, Benjamin Cavell, Fred Golan, Gary Lennon, Benjamin Daniel Lobato, Chris Provenzano, Graham Yost	FX
2010 (63rd)	Men of a Certain Age	Bridget Bedard, Tucker Cawley, Warren Hutcherson, Rick Muirragui, Jack Orman, Ray Romano, Mike Royce, Lew Schneider, Mark Stegemann	TNT
2010 (63rd)	Treme	Lolis Eric Elie, David Mills, Eric Overmyer, George Pelecanos, Tom Piazza, Davis Rogan, David Simon	HBO
2010 (63rd)	The Walking Dead	Frank Darabont, Charles H. Eglee, Adam Fierro, Robert Kirkman, Jack LoGiudice, Glen Mazzara	AMC
2011 (64th)
2011 (64th)	Homeland	Henry Bromell, Alexander Cary, Alex Gansa, Howard Gordon, Chip Johannessen, Gideon Raff, Meredith Stiehm	Showtime
2011 (64th)	Game of Thrones	David Benioff, Bryan Cogman, Jane Espenson, George R. R. Martin, D. B. Weiss	HBO
2011 (64th)	The Killing	Linda Burstyn, Jeremy Doner, Soo Hugh, Dan Nowak, Nic Pizzolatto, Dawn Prestwich, Veena Sud, Nicole Yorkin, Aaron Zelman	AMC
2011 (64th)	Episodes	David Crane, Jeffrey Klarik	Showtime
2011 (64th)	New Girl	Nick Adams, Rachel Axler, Brett Baer, Donick Cary, Dave Finkel, Berkley Johnson, Josh Malmuth, Elizabeth Meriwether, J.J. Philbin, Joe Port, Luvh Rakhe, Joe Wiseman	Fox
2012 (65th)
2012 (65th)	Girls	Judd Apatow, Lesley Arfin, Lena Dunham, Sarah Heyward, Bruce Eric Kaplan, Jenni Konner, Deborah Schoeneman, Dan Sterling	HBO
2012 (65th)	The Mindy Project	Ike Barinholtz, Jeremy Bronson, Linwood Boomer, Adam Countee, Harper Dill, Mindy Kaling, Chris McKenna, B. J. Novak, David Stassen, Matt Warburton	Fox
2012 (65th)	Nashville	Wendy Calhoun, Jason George, David Gould, David Marshall Grant, Dana Greenblatt, Dee Johnson, Todd Ellis Kessler, Callie Khouri, Meredith Lavender, Nancy Miller, James Parriott, Liz Tigelaar, Marcie Ulin	ABC
2012 (65th)	The Newsroom	Brendan Fehily, David M. Handelman, Cinque Henderson, Paul Redford, Ian Reichbach, Amy Rice, Aaron Sorkin, Gideon Yago	HBO
2012 (65th)	Veep	Jesse Armstrong, Simon Blackwell, Roger Drew, Sean Gray, Armando Iannucci, Ian Martin, Tony Roche, Will Smith	HBO
2013 (66th)
2013 (66th)	House of Cards	Kate Barnow, Rick Cleveland, Sam Forman, Gina Gionfriddo, Keith Huff, Sarah Treem, Beau Willimon	Netflix
2013 (66th)	The Americans	Michael Batistick, Joshua Brand, Joel Fields, Melissa James Gibson, Sneha Koorse, Joe Weisberg, Bradford Winters	FX
2013 (66th)	Masters of Sex	Michelle Ashford, Tyler Bensinger, Michael Cunningham, Lyn Greene, Richard Levine, Amy Lippman, Sam Shaw, Noelle Valdivia	Showtime
2013 (66th)	Orange Is the New Black	Liz Friedman, Sian Heder, Tara Herrmann, Sara Hess, Nick Jones, Jenji Kohan, Gary Lennon, Lauren Morelli, Marco Ramirez	Netflix
2013 (66th)	Ray Donovan	Ann Biderman, Sean Conway, David Hollander, Brett Johnson, Ron Nyswaner	Showtime
2014 (67th)
2014 (67th)	True Detective	Nic Pizzolatto	HBO
2014 (67th)	The Affair	Dan LeFranc, Hagai Levi, Melanie Marnich, Eric Overmyer, Kate Robin, Sarah Treem	Showtime
2014 (67th)	The Knick	Jack Amiel, Michael Begler, Steven Katz	Cinemax
2014 (67th)	Silicon Valley	John Altschuler, Alec Berg, Matteo Borghese, Jessica Gao, Mike Judge, Dave Krinsky, Carson Mell, Dan O'Keefe, Clay Tarver, Rob Turbovsky, Ron Weiner	HBO
2014 (67th)	Transparent	Bridget Bedard, Micah Fitzerman-Blue, Noah Harpster, Ethan Kuperberg, Ali Liebegott, Faith Soloway, Joey Soloway	Prime Video
2015 (68th)
2015 (68th)	Mr. Robot	Kyle Bradstreet, Kate Erickson, Sam Esmail, David Iserson, Randolph Leon, Adam Penn, Matt Pyken	USA
2015 (68th)	Better Call Saul	Vince Gilligan, Peter Gould, Gennifer Hutchison, Bradley Paul, Thomas Schnauz, Gordon Smith	AMC
2015 (68th)	Bloodline	Jonathan Glatzer, Carter Harris, Glenn Kessler, Todd A. Kessler, Addison McQuigg, Arthur Phillips, Jeff Shakoor, Daniel Zelman	Netflix
2015 (68th)	The Last Man on Earth	Andy Bobrow, Liz Cackowski, Erik Durbin, Will Forte, Kira Kalush, Matt Marshall, Tim McAuliffe, David Noel, Erica Rivinoja, John Solomon, Emily Spivey	Fox
2015 (68th)	Unbreakable Kimmy Schmidt	Emily Altman, Jack Burditt, Robert Carlock, Azie Mira Dungey, Tina Fey, Lauren Gurganous, Charla Lauriston, Sam Means, Dan Rubin, Meredith Scardino, Allison Silverman, Lon Zimmet	Netflix
2016 (69th)
2016 (69th)	Atlanta	Donald Glover, Stephen Glover, Stefani Robinson, Paul Simms	FX
2016 (69th)	Better Things	Pamela Adlon, Louis C.K., Cindy Chupack, Gina Fattore	FX
2016 (69th)	Stranger Things	Paul Dichter, Justin Doble, The Duffer Brothers, Jessica Mecklenburg, Jessie Nickson-Lopez, Alison Tatlock	Netflix
2016 (69th)	This Is Us	Isaac Aptaker, Elizabeth Berger, Bekah Brunstetter, Dan Fogelman, Vera Herbert, Joe Lawson, Kay Oyegun, Aurin Squire, K.J. Steinberg, Donald Todd	NBC
2016 (69th)	Westworld	Ed Brubaker, Bridget Carpenter, Dan Dietz, Halley Gross, Lisa Joy, Katherine Lingenfelter, Dominic Mitchell, Jonathan Nolan, Roberto Patino, Daniel T. Thomsen, Charles Yu	HBO
2017 (70th)
2017 (70th)	The Handmaid's Tale	Ilene Chaiken, Nina Fiore, Dorothy Fortenberry, Leila Gerstein, John Herrera, Lynn Maxcy, Bruce Miller, Kira Snyder, Wendy Straker Hauser, Eric Tuchman	Hulu
2017 (70th)	American Vandal	Seth Cohen, Lauren Herstik, Dan Lagana, Kevin McManus, Matthew McManus, Jessica Meyer, Dan Perrault, Amy Pocha, Mike Rosolio, Tony Yacenda	Netflix
2017 (70th)	The Deuce	Megan Abbott, Marc Henry Johnson, Lisa Lutz, George Pelecanos, Richard Price, Will Ralston, David Simon, Chris Yakaitis	HBO
2017 (70th)	GLOW	Arabella Anderson, Kristoffer Diaz, Liz Flahive, Tara Herrmann, Nick Jones, Jenji Kohan, Emma Rathbone, Sascha Rothchild, Rachel Shukert	Netflix
2017 (70th)	Ozark	Whit Anderson, Bill Dubuque, Ryan Farley, Alyson Feltes, Paul Kolsby, David Manson, Chris Mundy, Mark Williams, Ning Zhou, Martin Zimmerman	Netflix
2018 (71st)
2018 (71st)	Barry	Alec Berg, Duffy Boudreau, Bill Hader, Emily Heller, Liz Sarnoff, Ben Smith, Sarah Solemani	HBO
2018 (71st)	The Haunting of Hill House	Meredith Averill, Charise Castro Smith, Mike Flanagan, Jeff Howard, Rebecca Leigh Klingel, Scott Kosar, Liz Phang	Netflix
2018 (71st)	Homecoming	Micah Bloomberg, Cami Delavigne, Eli Horowitz, Shannon Houston, Eric Simonson, David Wiener	Prime Video
2018 (71st)	Pose	Steven Canals, Brad Falchuk, Todd Kubrak, Janet Mock, Ryan Murphy, Our Lady J	FX
2018 (71st)	Succession	Jesse Armstrong, Simon Blackwell, Jon Brown, Jonathan Glatzer, Anna Jordan, Lucy Prebble, Georgia Pritchett, Tony Roche, Susan Soon He Stanton, Daniel Zelman	HBO
2019 (72nd)
2019 (72nd)	Watchmen	Lila Byock, Nick Cuse, Christal Henry, Branden Jacobs-Jenkins, Cord Jefferson, Jeff Jensen, Claire Kiechel, Damon Lindelof, Stacy Osei-Kuffour, Tom Spezialy, and Carly Wray	HBO
2019 (72nd)	Dead to Me	Rebecca Addelman, Njeri Brown, Liz Feldman, Kelly Hutchinson, Anthony King, Emma Rathbone, Kate Robin, and Abe Sylvia	Netflix
2019 (72nd)	PEN15	Jeff Chan, Maya Erskine, Anna Konkle, Gabe Liedman, Stacy Osei-Kuffour, Andrew Rhymer, Jessica Watson, and Sam Zvibleman	Hulu
2019 (72nd)	Russian Doll	Jocelyn Bioh, Flora Birnbaum, Cirocco Dunlap, Leslye Headland, Natasha Lyonne, Amy Poehler, Tami Sagher, and Allison Silverman	Netflix
2019 (72nd)	What We Do in the Shadows	Jesse Armstrong, Sam Bain, Jemaine Clement, Josh Lieb, Iain Morris, Stefani Robinson, Duncan Sarkies, Marika Sawyer, Tom Scharpling, Paul Simms, and Taika Waititi	FX

=== 2020s ===
Year	Program	Writer(s)	Network
2020 (73rd)
2020 (73rd)	Ted Lasso	Jane Becker, Leann Bowen, Brett Goldstein, Brendan Hunt, Joe Kelly, Bill Lawrence, Jamie Lee, Jason Sudeikis, Phoebe Walsh, Bill Wrubel	Apple TV+
2020 (73rd)	Dave	Dave Burd, Vanessa McGee, Saladin Patterson, Luvh Rakhe, Alex Russell, Jeff Schaffer, Max Searle, Yamara Taylor	FXX
2020 (73rd)	The Flight Attendant	Kara Lee Corthron, Michael Foley, Ryan Jennifer Jones, Ticona S. Joy, Meredith Lavender, Jess Meyer, Daniele Nathanson, Marcie Ulin, Ian Weinreich, Steve Yockey	HBO Max
2020 (73rd)	The Great	Vanessa Alexander, Tony McNamara, Tess Morris, Amelia Roper, Gretel Vella, James Wood	Hulu
2020 (73rd)	Lovecraft Country	Misha Green, Shannon Houston, Jonathan Kidd, Kevin Lau, Ihuoma Ofordire, Wes Taylor, Sonya Winton	HBO
2021 (74th)
2021 (74th)	Hacks	Lucia Aniello, Joanna Calo, Jessica Chaffin, Paul W. Downs, Cole Escola, Janis E. Hirsch, Ariel Karlin, Katherine Kearns, Andrew Law, Joe Mande, Pat Regan, Samantha Riley, Michael Schur, Jen Statsky	HBO Max
2021 (74th)	Loki	Bisha K. Ali, Jess Dweck, Elissa Karasik, Tom Kauffman, Eric Martin, Michael Waldron	Disney+
2021 (74th)	Only Murders in the Building	Thembi Banks, Matteo Borghese, Rachel Burger, Kirker Butler, Madeleine George, John Hoffman, Stephen Markley, Steve Martin, Kristin Newman, Ben Philippe, Kim Rosenstock, Ben Smith, Rob Turbovsky	Hulu
2021 (74th)	Reservation Dogs	Tazbah Rose Chavez, Sydney Freeland, Sterlin Harjo, Migizi Pensoneau, Tommy Pico, Taika Waititi, Bobby Wilson	FX
2021 (74th)	Yellowjackets	Cameron Brent Johnson, Katherine Kearns, Jonathan Lisco, Ashley Lyle, Bart Nickerson, Liz Phang, Ameni Rozsa, Sarah L. Thompson, Chantelle M. Wells	Showtime
2022 (75th)
2022 (75th)	Severance	Chris Black, Andrew Colville, Kari Drake, Dan Erickson, Mark Friedman, Helen Leigh, Anna Moench, Amanda Overton	Apple TV+
2022 (75th)	Abbott Elementary	Quinta Brunson, Ava Coleman, Riley Dufurrena, Justin Halpern, Joya McCrory, Morgan Murphy, Brittani Nichols, Kate Peterman, Brian Rubenstein, Patrick Schumacker, Justin Tan, Jordan Temple, Garrett Werner	ABC
2022 (75th)	Andor	Dan Gilroy, Tony Gilroy, Stephen Schiff, Beau Willimon	Disney+
2022 (75th)	Bad Sisters	Brett Baer, Dave Finkel, Sharon Horgan	Apple TV+
2022 (75th)	The Bear	Karen Joseph Adcock, Joanna Calo, Rene Gube, Sofya Levitsky-Weitz, Alex O’Keefe, Catherine Schetina, Christopher Storer	FX
2023 (76th)
2023 (76th)	The Last of Us	Neil Druckmann, Halley Gross, Craig Mazin, Bo Shim	HBO/Max
2023 (76th)	The Diplomat	Eli Attie, Debora Cahn, Mia Chung, Anna Hagen, Amanda Johnson-Zetterstrom, Peter Noah	Netflix
2023 (76th)	Jury Duty	Tanner Bean, Lee Eisenberg, Marcos Gonzalez, Cody Heller, Mekki Leeper, Katrina Mathewson, Kerry O’Neill, Ese Shaw, Gene Stupnitsky, Andrew Weinberg, Evan Williams	Amazon Freevee
2023 (76th)	Poker Face	Christine Boylan, Wyatt Cain, Chris Downey, CS Fischer, Rian Johnson, Alice Ju, Joe Lawson, Natasha Lyonne, Charlie Peppers, Lilla Zuckerman, Nora Zuckerman	Peacock
2023 (76th)	Shrinking	Wally Baram, Rachna Fruchbom, Brian Gallivan, Neil Goldman, Brett Goldstein, Bill Lawrence, Annie Mebane, Bill Posley, Jason Segel, Sofia Selig	Apple TV+
2024 (77th)
2024 (77th)	Shōgun	Shannon Goss, Maegan Houang, Rachel Kondo, Matt Lambert, Justin Marks, Caillin Puente, Nigel Williams, Emily Yoshida	FX on Hulu
2024 (77th)	English Teacher	Brian Jordan Alvarez, Wally Baram, Jake Bender, Emmy Blotnick, Zach Dunn, Dave King, Stephanie Koenig, Jonathan Krisel, Paul Simms, Samantha Shier	FX on Hulu
2024 (77th)	Fallout	Jake Bender, Karey Dornetto, Zach Dunn, Kieran Fitzgerald, Chaz Hawkins, Lisa Joy, Carson Mell, Jonathan Nolan, Geneva Robertson-Dworet, Gursimran Sandhu, Graham Wagner	Prime Video
2024 (77th)	Mr. and Mrs. Smith	Carla Ching, Adamma Ebo, Adanne Ebo, Donald Glover, Stephen Glover, Schuyler Pappas, Francesca Sloane, and Yvonne Hana Yi	Prime Video
2024 (77th)	Nobody Wants This	Barbie Adler, Jane Becker, Jack Burditt, Vali Chandrasekaran, Craig DiGregorio, Erin Foster, Lindsay Golder, Steven Levitan, Pat Regan, Niki Schwartz-Wright, Neel Shah, Noelle Valdivia, Ron Weiner, Ryann Werner	Netflix
2025 (78th)
2025 (78th)	The Pitt	Cynthia Adarkwa, Simran Baidwan, Valerie Chu, R. Scott Gemmill, Elyssa Gershman, Joe Sachs, Noah Wyle	HBO/Max
2025 (78th)	The Chair Company	Zach Kanin, Gary Richardson, Tim Robinson, Marika Sawyer, Sarah Schneider, John Solomon	HBO/Max
2025 (78th)	Pluribus	Vera Blasi, Jenn Carroll, Vince Gilligan, Jonny Gomez, Peter Gould, Ariel Levine, Gordon Smith, Alison Tatlock	Apple TV
2025 (78th)	The Studio	Evan Goldberg, Alex Gregory, Peter Huyck, Frida Perez, Seth Rogen	Apple TV
2025 (78th)	Task	Brad Ingelsby & David Obzud	HBO/Max

== Total awards by network ==
7 awards

- HBO

3 awards

- ABC

1 award

- Apple TV+
- AMC
- FX
- FX on Hulu
- Hulu
- Netflix
- Showtime
- USA Network

== Total nominations by network ==
20 nominations

- HBO

12 nominations

- Netflix

10 nominations

- FX

7 nominations

- ABC
- NBC
- Showtime

5 nominations

- AMC
- Fox

4 nominations

- Apple TV+
- Hulu
- Prime Video

2 nominations

- Disney+
- HBO Max

1 nomination

- Amazon Freevee
- CBS
- Cinemax
- Comedy Central
- FXX
- Peacock
- TNT
- UPN
- USA
