= There's Only One Way to Try a Case =

- Damages episode
- Episode no.: Season 4 Episode 1
- Directed by: Todd A. Kessler
- Written by: Todd A Kessler; Glenn Kessler; Daniel Zelman
- Original air date: July 13, 2011
- Running time: 57 minutes

Guest appearances
- Michael Nouri; Chris Messina; Bailey Chase; Tom Noonan

Episode chronology
← Previous "The Next One's Gonna Go In Your Throat"	Next → "I've Done Way Too Much for This Girl"

"There's Only One Way to Try a Case" is the first episode of the fourth season of the DirecTV legal drama series Damages and the show's fortieth episode overall. It was written by creators and executive producers Todd A. Kessler, Glenn Kessler and Daniel Zelman and directed by Todd A. Kessler. It originally premiered in the United States on DirecTV's Audience Network on July 13, 2011, and was the first episode of the series to air on DirecTV after the series moved from the FX network.

== Synopsis ==
It has been two and a half years since the death of Tom Shayes (Tate Donovan) and Ellen Parsons (Rose Byrne) is working at the prestigious law firm Nye, Everett & Polk and has been seeing one of the partners, Sean Everett (Bailey Chase). When Christopher Sanchez (Chris Messina), an Afghanistan War veteran and old high school boyfriend of Ellen's, gets in touch with her, Ellen begins to suspect that High Star, a billion dollar private security firm, is covering up the deaths of three of Sanchez's soldiers. She starts working on building a wrongful death suit against High Star and its founder and CEO, Howard T. Erickson (John Goodman).

Meanwhile, Patty Hewes (Glenn Close), now the sole leader of Hewes & Associates, has taken a case against a French pharmaceutical manufacturing company whose clinical drug trials have caused the deaths of dozens of people while also trying to raise her granddaughter Catherine. She and Ellen occasionally meet to exchange legal strategy and Patty warns Ellen against trying a case against High Star, saying that it is a dangerous company to make an enemy of. Patty struggles to find a suitable nanny to help raise her granddaughter and, after firing the latest appointee, is urged by her ex-husband Phil (Michael Nouri) to track down her son and Catherine's father Michael, who disappeared almost three years earlier. Patty hires Detective Victor Huntley (Tom Noonan) to investigate Michael's whereabouts.

The Senate refuses to renew High Star's contract with the U.S. Government and Erickson turns to his shadowy associate Jerry Boorman (Dylan Baker) in order to secure the contracts. Boorman has been keeping an eye on the increasingly unstable Sanchez and, after discovering that he has been talking to Ellen, has Ellen's phones tapped in order to keep tabs on what she and Sanchez discuss. Sanchez's old army friend Anthony Carter, who still works for High Star and routinely reports to Erickson about Sanchez's condition, recommends a psychiatrist for Sanchez to help with his posttraumatic stress disorder. Sanchez begins to open up to this doctor about the illegal mission High Star sent his unit on, which resulted in his men's deaths, but that night the doctor's office is blown up, an event seemingly orchestrated by Boorman.

A future timeline jumps three months ahead, where a young Afghan boy brings a prisoner bound to a chair with a hood over his head a sandwich. The unknown prisoner, wearing a medallion identical to the one Sanchez previously wore, is then approached by two masked men who threaten him with a machete. Later, Ellen stumbles upon the blood-soaked scene and breaks down in tears.

== Production ==
"There's Only One Way to Try a Case" was the eighteenth script of Damages for each of the three creators, Todd A. Kessler, Glenn Kessler and Daniel Zelman. The episode was directed by Todd A. Kessler, his sixth such credit for the series and his third-season premiere.

== Title reference ==
This episode's title is taken from a line Patty delivers to Ellen when she warns her former protégée about the dangers of filing suit against High Star, "There's only one way to try a case, Ellen: the one that lets you win."

== Reception ==
=== Critical reviews ===
The episode was met with a strong positive reaction from television critics. Matt Roush of TV Guide proclaimed the series was "still sleekly suspenseful and lethally cynical... Damages is worth it. And for those without access to DirecTV, worth the wait." Entertainment Weekly's Ken Tucker awarded the episode a B+, saying "...I still will not be able to resist watching every episode I possibly can." "... The acting by Close and Byrne has beautifully captured this burning schizophrenia," writes David Hinkcley of The New York Daily News. He concludes by saying, "Best of all, Patty returns to the unanswered question that Ellen asked her last season: 'Is it worth it?' For viewers, yes, it is." Mark Perigard from The Boston Herald offered praise for the relationship between Patty and Ellen, saying "Though the season's conspiracy might not have the emotional power of last season’s ... the dynamic between Patty and Ellen becomes even more deliciously twisted." He praised the series overall by calling it "TV's most cunning series."

Not all reviews were completely favorable, however, with Variety's Brian Lowry saying, "... The fourth season's first couple of episodes underscore why this slow-moving series was a tough sell for FX", but continued by stating "To its credit, "Damages" remains the kind of show that demands genuine attention; there's no reading the newspaper or scribbling crosswords while watching it." Verne Gay from Newsday also criticized the season's slow start, calling it "a bit deliberately paced," but concluded that it was "a good start." James Poniewozik from Time criticized the season's story in general, saying "the show has become a little like legal 24 for me: lots of talent and strong performances, but it has increasingly seemed to strain to up its stakes in its one-case-a-season format."

=== Ratings ===
DirecTV has reported that the season four premiere of Damages was watched by 1 million viewers across its initial four airings. This is comparable to the 900,000 viewers that DirecTV reported for the season premiere of the final season of Friday Night Lights. For additional comparison, the season three finale of Damages on FX was viewed by a reported 975,000 viewers and the overall average of 956,000 viewers for its second season and 928,000 viewers for its third on FX.
