= Glenn Kessler =

Glenn Kessler is the name of:

- Glenn Kessler (journalist) (born 1959), American journalist and Washington Post diplomatic correspondent
- Glenn Kessler (screenwriter) (born 1970), American screenwriter and television producer
