= Robbery Homicide Division (TV series) =

Television series

- Genre: Police procedural Crime drama
- Created by: Barry Schindel
- Starring: Tom Sizemore; David Cubitt; Klea Scott; Michael Paul Chan; Barry Shabaka Henley
- Country of origin: United States
- Original language: English
- No. of seasons: 1
- No. of episodes: 13 (3 unaired)

Production
- Camera setup: Single-camera
- Running time: 45–48 minutes
- Production companies: Forward Pass; Universal Network Television

Original release
- Network: CBS
- Release: September 27, 2002 – April 21, 2003

Robbery Homicide Division (RHD) is an American police procedural television series that ran on CBS from September 27, 2002 to April 21, 2003, created by Barry Schindel with executive producers Michael Mann and Sandy Climan.

== Overview ==
The show took an intense, no-nonsense look at the present-day Los Angeles Police Department's Robbery Homicide Division. Lt. Sam Cole is the driven chief detective of a squad that is dedicated to solving some of the worst crimes the city has to offer. There were several technical advisers who worked on the show: Chic Daniel, an LAPD living legend who served more than twenty years on SWAT; Robert Deamer, a specialist of gang enforcement who is one of the most decorated veterans of Special Enforcement Unit (ex-C.R.A.S.H.); and Lieutenant Todd Reinhold, an actual squad leader of Special Weapons And Tactics.

The series was originally titled Metro which was the division where the show was originally going to be set. Then, the title was changed to RHD/LA which was used for the fall schedule announcement. CBS ordered the final title believing that people would be confused about what RHD stood for.

In April 2002, Schindel left to focus on his duties at NBC's Law & Order. Frank Spotnitz joined the show as an executive producer and the showrunner in May 2002 after The X-Files ended its nine-season run and then left in October because he decided that it "was not creatively the show that he wanted to be working on."

Thematically, the show was very reminiscent of Mann's film Heat in that it also dealt with a driven cop working the Robbery-Homicide Division leading a multi-ethnic squad. Stylistically, Mann has said that RHD was a chance to test out some of the high-definition digital cameras he would later employ to much greater effect on Collateral and the film version of Miami Vice.

== Cast ==
- Tom Sizemore as Lt. Sam Cole
- David Cubitt as Det. Richard Barstow
- Michael Paul Chan as Det. Ron Lu
- Klea Scott as Det. Sonia Robbins
- Barry Shabaka Henley as Sgt. Albert Simms

== Episodes ==
No.	Title	Directed by	Written by	Original release date	Prod. code
1	"A Life of Its Own"	Stephen Gyllenhaal	Barry Schindel	September 27, 2002	E3801
2	"Mini-Mall"	Fred Keller	Todd A. Kessler	October 4, 2002	E3802
3	"2028 (a.k.a. Internet Sex)"	D. J. Caruso	Story by : Philippe Browning; Teleplay by : Philippe Browning, Frank Spotnitz, Todd A. Kessler & Jan Oxenberg	October 11, 2002	E3803
4	"Free and Clear"	D.J. Caruso	Vince Gilligan	October 18, 2002	E3807
5	"Alton Davis Redux"	Rod Hardy	Carter Harris	October 25, 2002	E3805
6	"In/Famous"	Paul Michael Glaser	Story by : Bonnie Mark & Frank Spotnitz & Jan Oxenberg; Teleplay by : Frank Spotnitz & Jan Oxenberg	November 1, 2002	E3806
7	"City of Strivers (a.k.a. Defense Lawyer)"	Rod Hardy	Jan Oxenberg	November 8, 2002	E3804
8	"Wild Ride (a.k.a. Zero Disrespect)"	Nick Gomez	Todd A. Kessler	November 15, 2002	E3808
9	"Life is Dust"	Mario Van Peebles	Story by : Michael Mann; Teleplay by : Todd A. Kessler & Glenn Kessler	November 30, 2002	E3810
10	"Had"	Paul Michael Glaser	Todd A. Kessler & Glenn Kessler; Gustave Reininger	December 7, 2002	E3811
11	"Hellbound Train"	Ami Canaan Mann	Jan Oxenberg	Unaired (Note: The remaining three unaired episodes premiered on the USA Network in April 2003. Afterwards, they aired on HDNet and Sleuth in 2008.)	E3812
12	"Vamonos, Chica"	Bill Duke	Todd A. Kessler & Glenn Kessler & Sean Whitesell	Unaired	E3809
13	"Absolute Perfection"	Paul Michael Glaser	David O. Sosna	Unaired	E3814

== Cancellation ==
Although RHD was critically acclaimed, Law & Order: Special Victims Unit had better ratings in the same time slot. CBS placed the show on hiatus after the December 7th episode. The series was cancelled after ten episodes. Mann told Variety magazine, "I guess maybe the show never found its audience." There was possible interest by HBO or CBS sister network Showtime to pick up the series, but it never went further than speculation. Because of its NBC Universal ownership, reruns of the series have since aired on the high definition network Universal HD.

It is rumored that the arrest of Tom Sizemore, due to a drug related incident, ultimately led to the cancellation of the show. Sizemore stated during filming of his show Shooting Sizemore that he regretted letting down all the cast members, staff, and producer Michael Mann. The actor claimed that the cancellation created a rift between him and close mentor Mann which had not been resolved.

== Reception ==
In her review for The New York Times, Caryn James wrote, "The executive producers, Mr. Mann and Frank Spotnitz (a producer of The X-Files), have created a style that does not dominate substance so much as it makes a dark subject palatable."

Chicago Sun-Times gave the show three out of four stars and Phil Rosenthal felt that the show, "holds a lot of promise, but a lot of that promise remains unrealized in this opener. It's just a little confusing."

The Los Angeles Daily News gave the show three out of four star and David Kronke felt that the "storytelling may be spotty - convenient contrivances help our heroes to their resolutions - but the richly cinematic quality of the programs make them seem deeper, smarter and more resonant than they really are. The series is also adept at capturing Los Angeles' multiculturalism, though it seems to insist upon depicting it as somewhat sinister."

USA Today gave the show two out of four stars and felt that it was "all style and no story."

In his review for the Washington Post, Tom Shales praised Tom Sizemore's performance: "What saves it, really, is the key performance: Tom Sizemore as Detective Sam Cole, head of one of those elite teams inside the police force that get to dress well and barge in without search warrants and so on. Sizemore veritably storms the screen in one of those can't-look-away performances that make a character instantly indelible. You feel you recognize Sam Cole and yet never saw anyone exactly like him before."

In his review for the San Francisco Chronicle, Tim Goodman wrote that the show, "plays out like a moody film."

== Ratings ==
The show debuted on Friday at 10pm ET/9c to an anemic 8.41 million viewers. CBS gave RHD two chances to capture a wider audience by airing two episodes on Saturday night. The first tryout was unsuccessful, but the second Saturday airing on December 7, 2002 did capture a larger audience; garnering a 5.7 household rating, while its lead-in The District received 7.3 million viewers and a 5.1 rating. On average, the show drew 7.1 million viewers an episode.

- Episode 1 (9/27/02) - Viewers: 8.41 million; household rating: 5.6
- Episode 2 (10/04/02) - Viewers: 8.0 million; household rating: 5.2
- Episode 3 (10/11/02) - Viewers: 7.7 million; household rating: 5.4
- Episode 4 (10/18/02) - Viewers: 6.2 million; household rating: 4.2
- Episode 5 (10/25/02) - Viewers: 6.6 million; household rating: 4.3
- Episode 6 (11/01/02) - Viewers: 6.9 million; household rating: 4.7
- Episode 7 (11/08/02) - Viewers: 6.8 million; household rating: 4.7
- Episode 8 (11/15/02) - Viewers: 6.5 million; household rating: 4.4
- Episode 9 (11/30/02) - Viewers: 7.6 million; household rating: 5.1 (Sat 10:40pm ET) [after Ice Wars; competition was Erin Brockovich & College Football]
- Episode 10 (12/07/02) - Viewers: 8.9 million; household rating: 5.7 (Sat 10pm ET) [after SEC Championship]
