= Bloodline (TV series) =

American psychological thriller TV series

- Season 1 poster
- Genre: Drama; Psychological thriller
- Created by: Todd A. Kessler; Glenn Kessler; Daniel Zelman
- Starring: Kyle Chandler; Ben Mendelsohn; Linda Cardellini; Norbert Leo Butz; Jacinda Barrett; Jamie McShane; Enrique Murciano; Sam Shepard; Sissy Spacek; Katie Finneran; John Leguizamo; Andrea Riseborough; Chloë Sevigny
- Opening theme: "The Water Lets You In" by Book of Fears
- Country of origin: United States
- Original language: English
- No. of seasons: 3
- No. of episodes: 33 (list of episodes)

Production
- Executive producers: Todd A. Kessler; Glenn Kessler; Daniel Zelman; Chris Mundy; Michael Morris; David Manson; Mark A. Baker
- Production location: Florida Keys
- Running time: 48–68 minutes
- Production companies: KZK Productions; Sarabande Productions; Sony Pictures Television

Original release
- Network: Netflix
- Release: March 20, 2015 – May 26, 2017

Bloodline is an American psychological thriller television series created by Todd A. Kessler, Glenn Kessler, and Daniel Zelman, and produced by Sony Pictures Television. The series premiered on February 9, 2015, in the Berlinale Special Galas section of the 65th Berlin International Film Festival, and the 13-episode first season premiered in its entirety, on Netflix, on March 20, 2015. On March 31, 2015, Bloodline was renewed for a 10-episode second season that debuted on May 27, 2016. On July 13, 2016, Netflix renewed Bloodline for a 10-episode third season, later confirmed to be the final season. The third and final season was released on May 26, 2017.

The first season received positive reviews from many critics, with most praising its performances (particularly for Ben Mendelsohn and Kyle Chandler) and cinematography. However, the second and third seasons received mixed responses from critics.

== Plot ==
Season	Episodes	Originally released
1	13	March 20, 2015
2	10	May 27, 2016
3	10	May 26, 2017

=== Season 1 (2015) ===
The series begins with narration by John Rayburn:

Sometimes you know something's coming. You feel it. In the air. In your gut. And you don't sleep at night. The voice in your head is telling you that something is going to go terribly wrong and there's nothing you can do to stop it. That's how I felt when my brother came home.

Danny Rayburn returns home to Islamorada, Florida, for the 45th anniversary of his parents' Robert and Sally Rayburn's seaside inn, the Rayburn House; a pier will be dedicated in their honor to mark the occasion. Danny is the black sheep of the family, among them his three younger siblings: John, Kevin, and Meg. John is a detective with the local sheriff's office, Kevin owns a local marina, and Meg is an attorney with a local law firm. Danny wants to make his return permanent as he wishes to stay to help his parents at their inn. Robert is reluctant to let Danny stay, but leaves it up to the three siblings to decide Danny's fate.

The siblings decide against Danny staying as they conclude that he will only break their mother's heart in the end. John breaks the news to Danny, but lies to him by telling him it was their father who ultimately wanted him gone, rather than the siblings. Even though he gets a ride to the bus station from John, in the end, Danny does not leave. Danny's confrontation with his father inadvertently causes Robert to have mini-strokes, which eventually cause his death.

The Rayburns' past is full of deep, dark secrets that are revealed throughout the season. Danny's dysfunctional relationship with his family primarily stems from the untimely death of his younger sister, Sarah, when he was a teenager. Danny took Sarah out on a boat. Her seahorse necklace fell into the water, and when she attempted to retrieve it, she drowned. Robert lost control and beat Danny severely, believing he was in some way responsible for her death. Sally covered up this abuse by pushing John, Kevin, and Meg to lie to the police about their brother's injuries, which they now claim were the result of Danny being hit by a drunk driver.

Robert's death now opens the door for Danny to have a permanent job at the inn. Danny appears to be changing his ways with hard work and dedication, which puts him in Sally's good graces. However, Danny's dark past is revealed via his connection with childhood friend and local troublemaker Eric O'Bannon. The two begin siphoning gasoline from local docks for drug dealer and human trafficker Wayne Lowry. As they gain Lowry's trust, they are given larger jobs to complete. Danny eventually uses his job at the Rayburn House as a front to smuggle cocaine for Lowry.

John and the sheriff's department collaborate with the DEA in an investigation into the deaths of unknown women and drug trafficking in Monroe County by Lowry and his men. The investigation leads John directly to Danny and his recent activities. While secretly investigating Danny, John discovers Danny's smuggled cocaine in a shed on the Rayburn House property. During a meeting between John, Kevin, and Meg, the three siblings conclude that the only way to fix the situation and not put the family's business at risk with the Feds is to move the drugs to Danny's condo in Miami without telling Danny. The loss of the drugs puts Danny in a bad situation with Lowry, who believes that Danny has stolen the cocaine from him. Lowry sends a hitman to assassinate Danny, but Danny kills the hitman instead.

Under pressure, Danny begins to act erratically. He tries to intimidate John by taking his daughter Jane out on a boat and giving her a seahorse necklace, similar to the one that belonged to their deceased sister, Sarah. John and his wife Diana take this as a threat against the family, so John sends his wife and children away for a few days. The seahorse necklace causes John to reach his breaking point. During a confrontation, John drowns Danny in the ocean. Distraught from murdering his brother, John has a heart problem (atrial fibrillation) and turns to Meg for help. Meg and Kevin decide to cover up the murder by moving Danny's body. John eventually sets a boat on fire to create an explosion that would frame Danny's death. Unsatisfied with what she is being told, Sally turns to long-time family friend and retired detective Lenny Potts to privately investigate the matter. In the aftermath of Danny's death, Meg moves to New York City to take a job with a large firm; Kevin reunites with his estranged wife, Belle, who is now pregnant with their child; and John reunites with Diana and his family. The season ends with the arrival of Danny's son, Nolan, at John's home to find out what happened to his father.

=== Season 2 (2016) ===
Danny's death continues to haunt the Rayburn family. Wayne Lowry confronts John, claiming to have a tape recorded by Danny that could be used as blackmail against John. John's deputy Marco Diaz continues to question people in relation to Danny's death, including Eric O'Bannon. Meg returns from New York, John runs for Sheriff, and Kevin continues to struggle with his failing business. Nolan and his mother Eve arrive at the Rayburn house and meet Sally to discuss Danny. Through Nolan and Eve, the Rayburns learn more about Danny's past, including his asking Robert to borrow some money for his restaurant. Robert made him choose between that or his continuing to send money to Eve for Nolan's support. Ozzy, an old friend of Danny's from Miami, has gotten involved with Eve and works with her to appeal Meg's cancellation after her father's death of the payments to Eve for child support of Nolan. John tries to get the tape from Lowry by telling him to turn himself in so that the DEA can arrest his contacts and his family will be protected. Lowry considers the offer, but backs down due to Kevin giving back some of the drugs Danny had. Lowry is killed by the father of one of the victims killed when he blew up a boat containing people they were trafficking. While John runs for Sheriff, Marco gets closer to finding Danny's killer. Marco, who used to have a relationship with Meg, grows to resent the Rayburn family for lying and telling contradictory stories. Eric O'Bannon tells Marco he has proof that John killed Danny. Kevin goes to see Marco to tell him that John killed Danny; Marco responds that John, Meg, and Kevin are all going to prison. Kevin tries to confess to Marco, and then murders him.

=== Season 3 (2017) ===
Following Marco's murder, Kevin seeks Roy Gilbert's help to cover up the murder. Gilbert engineers a plan that frames O'Bannon for the murder, but Kevin nearly loses his life in the process. The impending trial creates further rifts within the Rayburn clan; Meg vanishes, Kevin becomes further ensnared in Gilbert's shady machinations, and John is increasingly consumed by guilt for Danny's death. Meg goes and hides in Los Angeles. Ozzy kills himself after getting captured by Gilbert's men prior to Gilbert's apparent death from a heart attack. Sally reveals the truth about the Rayburns' past of hiding secrets. O'Bannon loses the trial and ends up in jail. Kevin gets arrested for smuggling drugs for Gilbert. Sally confesses to hating John and Kevin, and that Danny was her favorite. John is conflicted about whether to confess to Nolan about Danny; the series ends as their conversation is about to begin.

== Cast ==
=== Main cast ===
- Kyle Chandler as John Rayburn, the second son; a detective and local deputy with the Monroe County, Florida sheriff's office
- Ben Mendelsohn as Danny Rayburn, the oldest son and black sheep of the family (seasons 1–2; guest season 3)
- Linda Cardellini as Meg Rayburn, the daughter and youngest sibling; an attorney and the family peacekeeper
- Norbert Leo Butz as Kevin Rayburn, the hot-headed youngest son; he refurbishes boats at Indian Key Channel Marina
- Jacinda Barrett as Diana Rayburn, John's wife; she runs a plant nursery
- Jamie McShane as Eric O'Bannon, Danny's friend and Chelsea's brother; a parolee
- Enrique Murciano as Marco Diaz, Meg's former long-term romantic partner; a detective with the Monroe County sheriff's office and John's partner
- Sam Shepard as Robert Rayburn, the patriarch (season 1; guest season 2)
- Sissy Spacek as Sally Rayburn, the matriarch
- Katie Finneran as Belle Rayburn, Kevin's estranged wife (seasons 2–3, recurring season 1)
- John Leguizamo as Ozzy Delvecchio, a man from Danny's past (seasons 2–3)
- Andrea Riseborough as Evangeline 'Eve' Radosevich, the mother of Nolan Rayburn who has unfinished business with the Rayburn family (season 2)
- Chloë Sevigny as Chelsea O'Bannon, Eric's younger sister; a nurse (season 3, recurring seasons 1–2)

=== Recurring cast ===
- Steven Pasquale as Alec Moros, Meg's legal client and lover
- Mia Kirshner as Sarah Rayburn, Sally and Robert's deceased elder daughter. Angela Winiewicz portrays young Sarah in flashbacks.
- Brandon Larracuente as Ben Rayburn, John and Diana's son
- Taylor Rouviere as Janie Rayburn, John and Diana's daughter
- Glenn Morshower as Wayne Lowry, a local bait shop owner who deals and distributes illegal drugs
- Gino Vento as Rafi Quintana, smuggler and Wayne Lowry's employee
- Eliezer Castro as Carlos Mejia, a former employee of the Rayburns' who hires Meg as a lawyer
- Bill Kelly as Clay Grunwald, a DEA agent
- Jeremy Palko as Nicholas Widmark, Kevin Rayburn's neighbor
- Randy Gonzalez as Manny, employee at the Rayburn House
- Frank Hoyt Taylor as Lenny Potts, an old Navy friend of Robert's and a retired Monroe County detective
- Owen Teague as Nolan Rayburn, Danny's son, whom only Robert knew about; Teague also portrays the young Danny Rayburn in flashbacks
- Beau Bridges as Roy Gilbert, a political supporter and ally of John Rayburn for county sheriff, and a drug trafficker
- David Zayas as Sheriff Aguirre, the incumbent sheriff running against John; also his and Marco's superior
- Molly Price as Mia Santos, Eric O'Bannon's attorney
- Mario Van Peebles as court prosecutor

== Production ==
=== Conception ===
Bloodline was announced in October 2014 as part of a partnership between Netflix and Sony Pictures Television, representing Netflix's first major deal with a major film studio for a television series. The series was created and executive produced by Todd A. Kessler, Glenn Kessler, and Daniel Zelman, who previously created the FX series Damages. According to its official synopsis released by Netflix, Bloodline "centers on a close-knit family of four adult siblings whose secrets and scars are revealed when their black sheep brother returns home."

The writing trio settled on the theme of family as they tried to determine what their next project would look like. According to Zelman, "Over the years we've found ourselves talking a lot about family and how family dynamics have changed — or not changed — as we've gotten older." Glenn Kessler added, "As we've hit our 40s, our understanding of our family dynamics has begun to change. And because we all come from families with three sons, we recognize the roles we play. It's something we'd been talking about. So the thought was, why not try to mine some of that in our creative life?"

They settled on a family-thriller genre, set in the Florida Keys, which explored the ghost of the past in family role formation. The pitch was attractive to a number of outlets before Netflix landed the drama as a 13-hour season to launch all at once — a structural advantage very important to the show's creators.

=== Casting ===
The creators were intrigued by the idea of casting Kyle Chandler, whose on-screen persona in Friday Night Lights was warm and inviting, to play the ostensibly noble but deeply flawed John Rayburn. They met with Chandler in Austin, Texas, and pitched the part: "This is like an experiment. We're not quite sure if this is going to work the way we're doing it, but we want to try to create this family dynamic we're aware of and create this family around it. And their hesitancy of whether it would work or not... made me, thinking back on it, realize they were into it 110% because they were trying to create something new. I didn't know what would happen with it or where it could go... But I was like, I'm in."

Ben Mendelsohn was the only actor whom the producers met with for the role of Danny Rayburn; they found his combination of intellect and acting ability perfectly suited to the part. Glenn Kessler was grateful for Netflix's hands-off approach to the decision, explaining, "They very much supported us finding the best actor that we thought could play the role."

In addition, as much of the show's dramatic tension comes from the relationship between John and Danny, a certain chemistry between the two actors was vital. According to Chandler, "[Mendelsohn]'s so easy to work with. And yet, he's tricky — when you're working with him, [psychologically] there's so much going on."

Linda Cardellini and Norbert Leo Butz secured their parts as siblings Meg and Kevin Rayburn, respectively, through meetings with the creators. According to Kessler, Sissy Spacek and Sam Shepard were described prior to casting as the "dream" actors they would want to play the Rayburn parents. A Damages fan, Spacek signed on after the cast started coming together, explaining, "There's so much good work coming out of television. I wanted to be a part of it."

The second season features the additions of John Leguizamo and Andrea Riseborough as series regulars, both playing characters from Danny's past. Ben Mendelsohn returns as a series regular for the second season, despite his character's having been killed off in season 1. Kessler said: "The DNA of the show is such that the past is always with us," and "We're going to learn more about Danny's effect on the family and more about his past, and also what his effects are in the present day... [Mendelsohn's return] was always part of the plan. When we first hired him, it was for more than the first season."

The third season features Chloë Sevigny as a series regular; she had previously recurred in seasons 1 and 2.

=== Filming ===
Todd A. Kessler described why they shot the show on location in the Florida Keys: "We looked at several places and realized there is no place quite like the Keys and the color of the water and being outside and it really feeling like paradise and then having this kind of underbelly of what's going on underneath it."

The creators acknowledged Crime and Punishment as a major narrative influence for what they described as a 13-hour movie. As Kessler explained: "In that story the murder takes place at about page 60 and there's another 400 pages of the book to go. The tagline that we use for promotion — We're not bad people, but we did a bad thing — is very much the fabric of the series. The first season just gets us to the starting line."

The show favors a mix of classic noir and hyper-realism in its look. Cinematographer Jaime Reynoso said, "he never saw [Bloodline] as a TV show", finding the all-at-once Netflix model useful in filming the series as if it were a shorter film. He explained, "The concept the writers had was they wanted it hyper-realistic, almost documentary style." He found first takes were often the best, with actors not rehearsing in order to maintain spontaneity. Bloodline editor Naomi Geraghty also stressed the importance of realism to the show: "Nobody is ever saying what they're saying, so part of how you build on that is by staying with those moments and you save sharp or jarring cuts for flashbacks."

=== Production cost ===
In September 2016, Vulture reported that the cost per episode for the show was approximately US$7 million to US$8.5 million per hour, with a total cost for the 33 episodes between US$231–US$289 million. Despite receiving tax credits for shooting in Florida, shooting in the Florida Keys was costly. The high production cost is cited as one of the reasons for cancellation, despite positive reviews and award nominations. Executive producer Todd A. Kessler said: "We decided to set the show there ... because it's crucial to what the show is, not because of the tax incentive, but it does affect things financially for us and the show will be challenged because of that. It makes things more difficult".

== Reception ==
=== Critical ===
Critical response of Bloodline
Season	Rotten Tomatoes	Metacritic
1	81% (48 reviews)	75 (31 reviews)
2	53% (19 reviews)	60 (9 reviews)
3	53% (17 reviews)	—N/a

==== Season 1 ====
Critics received the first three episodes of Bloodline for initial review, and reception was positive—the season received a score of 75 out of 100 based on 31 reviews on Metacritic. Rotten Tomatoes gave the season an approval rating of 81%, with an average rating of 7/10 based on 48 reviews, and a critical consensus of: "While Bloodline's tricky timeline detracts from the potency of the story and its characters, the show remains an addictive, tightly drawn brainteaser framed on a believable canvas."

Several critics gave especially positive reviews. Ken Tucker of Yahoo! TV called it a "twisty mood piece ... well worth your time". Dorothy Rabinowitz, writing for The Wall Street Journal, said the series possesses a "magnetic pull". David Rooney of The Hollywood Reporter raved, "Chalk up another forceful punch [for Netflix] with Bloodline, a riveting, superbly cast slow-burn family drama set between the oceanfront paradise and the murky mangrove swamps of the Florida Keys." Other strong reviews came from The A.V. Club, the Los Angeles Times, The New York Times, The Philadelphia Inquirer, Variety, Entertainment Weekly, and the San Francisco Chronicle. Cinema Blend, Decider, Badass Digest, and Forbes have hailed Bloodline as the best Netflix original to date.

Debate ensued among some critics who felt the three episodes Netflix provided for review were insufficient. As Hank Stuever wrote in his review for The Washington Post, "I've enjoyed Bloodline so far, but it's impossible to say if it's consistently this good, because Netflix would share only three episodes (out of 13) with critics." For HitFix, Alan Sepinwall (who awarded the three episodes a B−) echoed the sentiment, saying, "We'll see if they play those [time-shifting] games to this extent with Bloodline — Todd Kessler has suggested to at least one reporter that the flash-forwards won't be a series-long (or even season-long) device — but for now, the new show seems more style over substance." He later revised his opinion on the matter, writing that Bloodline ultimately "played fair" with its narrative. He summed up his thoughts on the season: "In the end, Mendelsohn was so great that I'm glad I made it to the end, but this one feels better-suited to the anthology miniseries model than as an ongoing."

Other mixed reviews came from James Poniewozik of Time, Robert Bianco of USA Today and Margaret Lyons of Vulture. However, Sean Fitz-Gerald, who reviewed the season as a whole for Vulture, wrote in sum: "Bloodline was a gripping, slow burn of a journey, so stressful, engaging, and uncomfortable ... KZK did a fantastic job crafting something real enough to find introspective truth in."

The Playlist named Bloodline the normative successor to Breaking Bad because of its complex and tragic anti-hero narrative. Critic Nikola Grozdavonic said of Bloodline's neo-noir mystery: "As TV shows continue to soar during this golden age of television, the bar keeps rising higher and higher ... Right now [Bloodline is] the greatest example of how profoundly effective the 13-episode format can be in modern storytelling. Of course, shows have to be technically sound in order to represent their story in the greatest possible light, and the team behind Bloodline does an outstanding job in every technical department. Breathtaking cinematography, an immersive soundtrack, and a coyly observant camera all enhancing the viewing experience by a noticeable degree. The picturesque location of the Florida Keys, divided between gorgeous coral reefs and dark mangroves, is captured with an eye for the sensual and the symbolic. And yet, all of this would turn to dust if the story didn't reach as deep as it does, and the writing and performances weren't as spectacular as they are." IndieWire asserted that Bloodline's mix of noir and family drama allows it to successfully confront complex familial dynamics. According to author David Canfield, "The opening minutes of Bloodline rather perfectly ascertain a new trend happening in dramatic television right now: the family noir ... The conceit of these new series is to realize what's common to family-centric fiction within a construct that is both unsettling and pessimistic ... Bloodline identifies the origins of familial roles, each shaped by a cataclysmic event in the Rayburn siblings' childhood. The time-shifting is intrinsic to the show's ideas, exploring the formation of identity through flashbacks and, via glimpses of the future, affirming their inflexibility."

Critics' reactions were more divided to Bloodline in its entirety, with end-of-season reviews from publications, such Vox.com, IGN, and Uncle Barky, ending up very favorable, while reviews from HitFix, and Vulture were more mixed.

The first season was named among the best of 2015 by Rolling Stone, The Star-Ledger, Vanity Fair, The Guardian, IGN, The A.V. Club, The Week, Maxim and The Hollywood Reporter. However, IndieWire named the show one of the most disappointing TV shows of 2015.

==== Season 2 ====
Season 2 of Bloodline received mixed reviews from critics, with many reviewers criticizing the pacing, but praising the performances and cinematography. On Metacritic, the season has a score of 60 out of 100, based on 9 critics, indicating "mixed or average reviews". On Rotten Tomatoes, it has a 53% approval rating, based on 19 reviews, with a rating average of 6.1/10. The website's critical consensus reads, "Despite impressive performances and attractive cinematography, Bloodline's second season fails to recapture its predecessor's dramatic intrigue."

==== Season 3 ====
The third and final season received mixed reviews from critics. On Rotten Tomatoes, the season holds an approval rating of 53% and an average score of 6.1/10 based on 17 reviews. The critics' consensus: "Muddled and unsatisfying, Bloodline's final season offers disappointing proof that a stellar cast can only carry a series for so long."

=== Accolades ===
Year	Award	Category	Recipients	Result	Ref.
2015	Critics' Choice Television Awards	Best Supporting Actor in a Drama Series	Ben Mendelsohn	Nominated	
2015	Primetime Emmy Awards	Outstanding Lead Actor in a Drama Series	Kyle Chandler	Nominated	
2015	Primetime Emmy Awards	Outstanding Supporting Actor in a Drama Series	Ben Mendelsohn	Nominated	
2015	Writers Guild of America Awards	Television: New Series	Bloodline	Nominated	
2015	EWwy Awards	Outstanding Supporting Actress in a Drama Series	Sissy Spacek	Nominated	
2016	Artios Awards	Achievement in Casting – Television Series Drama	Debra Zane, Lori Wyman, Shayna Markowitz	Nominated	
2016	Satellite Awards	Best Television Series – Drama	Bloodline	Nominated	
2016	Satellite Awards	Best Actor – Television Series Drama	Kyle Chandler	Nominated	
2016	Satellite Awards	Best Actor – Miniseries or Television Film	Ben Mendelsohn	Nominated	
2016	Golden Globe Awards	Best Supporting Actor – Series, Miniseries or Television Film	Ben Mendelsohn	Nominated	
2016	Primetime Emmy Awards	Outstanding Lead Actor in a Drama Series	Kyle Chandler	Nominated	
2016	Primetime Emmy Awards	Outstanding Supporting Actor in a Drama Series	Ben Mendelsohn	Won	
2016	IGN Awards	Best TV Actor	Ben Mendelsohn	Won	
2017	Artios Awards	Achievement in Casting – Television Series Drama	Debra Zane, Lori Wyman, Shayna Markowitz, Marie-Thérèse Verbruggen, Erin Fragetta	Won	
2017	Art Directors Guild Awards	One-Hour Contemporary Single-Camera Television Series	Tim Galvin	Nominated	
2017	Satellite Awards	Best Supporting Actor – Series, Miniseries or Television Film	Ben Mendelsohn	Won	
2017	Primetime Emmy Awards	Outstanding Guest Actor in a Drama Series	Ben Mendelsohn	Nominated	

=== Commercial ===
The official trailer was released in mid-February, containing the Lissie cover of Metallica's song "Nothing Else Matters". After the trailer's release, Bloodline ranked eighth among all cable/streaming programs in Digital Audience Ratings and was the top trending program, despite being a month out of its premiere. According to Variety, "The first full trailer release for [Netflix's] upcoming drama 'Bloodline' ... already has nearly 1 million more views in just a week's time, landing the show on the Cable/Streaming and Trending leaderboards this week."

== Home media ==
Bloodline has been released on DVD in Australia; season 1 on May 5, 2016, season 2 on May 31, 2017; and season 3 on July 4, 2018. The first season has also been released on DVD and Blu-ray in Europe in March 2016.
