= Nothing Sacred (TV series) =

- Genre: Drama
- Created by: Bill Cain; David Manson
- Starring: Kevin Anderson; Bruce Altman; Jennifer Beals; Scott Michael Campbell; Ann Dowd; Tamara Mello; Brad Sullivan; José Zúñiga
- Theme music composer: Mark Isham
- Composer: Jeff Beal
- Country of origin: United States
- Original language: English
- No. of seasons: 1
- No. of episodes: 20 (5 unaired)

Production
- Executive producers: Richard Kramer; David Manson
- Producers: Bill Cain; Greer Shephard; Cyrus Yavneh
- Running time: 60 mins.
- Production companies: Sarabande Productions; 20th Century Fox Television

Original release
- Network: ABC
- Release: September 18, 1997 – March 14, 1998

Nothing Sacred is an American drama television series that aired from 1997 to 1998 on ABC. The series was created by Jesuit priest Bill Cain and producer David Manson.

The series centered on the daily goings-on at a parish in an inner-city neighborhood. The show drew criticism from some Catholic organizations for its frank treatment of sensitive issues such as AIDS, racism, and abortion, as well as its portrayal of church issues in the post-Second Vatican Council era, which some saw as favoring those with more liberal views of the council. The show and its sponsors were targeted for boycotts by the Catholic League. The series faced low ratings and ABC canceled its order for the final four episodes, eventually canceling the series entirely after the March 14, 1998 episode (with five completed episodes left unaired).

The series did win critical acclaim, including a Peabody Award for its "honest portrayal of the complexity of faith in the modern era" and a Humanitas Prize. It also received nominations for Emmy Awards and a Golden Globe Award nomination for actor Kevin Anderson.

== Premise ==
Father Francis Xavier "Ray" Reyneaux is the head priest of St. Thomas Catholic Church, which is located in a low-income neighborhood of an unnamed city. Father Ray deals with his own personal crises of faith in addition to the challenges of serving the needs of his community. Besides Father Ray, the series also follows the predicaments of the parish staff, which includes feminist nun Sister Maureen "Mo" Brody, the inexperienced Father Eric, and church secretary Rachel.

The series included plot lines ranging from "the homeless and local opposition to their presence, the church’s soup kitchen, [Sister Mo's] insistence that God be addressed as both Mother and Father, Ray’s temptation to rekindle a romance with an old flame, the desire of his assistant priest to escape the turmoil of the city to a quiet monastery, the dissatisfaction of a pregnant parishioner at Ray’s refusal to answer her directly about abortion, and a broken father-son relationship."

== Cast ==
- Kevin Anderson as Father Francis Xavier "Ray" Reyneaux
- Bruce Altman as Sidney Walters
- Scott Michael Campbell as Father Eric
- Ann Dowd as Sister Maureen "Mo" Brody
- Tamara Mello as Rachel
- Brad Sullivan as Father Leo
- José Zúñiga as Juan Alberto "J.A." Ortiz
- Jennifer Beals as Justine Madsen Judd

== Episodes ==
| No. | Title | Directed by | Written by | Original release date | Prod. code |
|---|---|---|---|---|---|
| 1 | "Proofs for the Existence of God" | Richard Pearce | Paul Leland | September 18, 1997 | 5K79 |
In the pilot episode, Father Ray encounters his former girlfriend Gemma (Wendy Gazelle), who's now the stepmother of a troubled student in the parish school and in an unhappy marriage. He also experiences further stress after having his noncommittal advice in the confessional regarding abortion recorded and sent to the Bishop's office.
| 2 | "Song of Songs" | John Coles | Paul Leland | September 25, 1997 | 5K02 |
Things are brewing at the church soup kitchen: a politician (Jack Laufer) who wants to close the place accepts Father Ray's invitation to pay a visit---and brings a camera crew. On the same day, J.A.'s wedding plans go awry, forcing him to move his wedding reception to the soup kitchen.
| 3 | "Mixed Blessings" | Eugene Corr | Story by : Matt Fulony & Paul Leland; Teleplay by : Matt Fulony | October 2, 1997 | 5K03 |
Father Ray tries to reconcile a deceased parishioner's husband and daughters, a challenge complicated by the intense dislike that the widower (John Cullum) has for him. Meanwhile, the St. Thomas parish staff considers how to spend the anticipated windfall after a winning lottery ticket is donated to the church.
| 4 | "Parents and Children" | Claudia Weill | Story by : Jan Oxenberg & Paul Leland; Teleplay by : Jan Oxenberg | October 9, 1997 | 5K04 |
Rachel, who's seven weeks pregnant, tries to decide whether or not to have an abortion, while Father Ray and Father Leo passionately disagree on how to advise her on the matter. Meanwhile, a woman (Shelley Morrison) chains herself to the steps of the church to protest a parishioner who is a slum lord.
| 5 | "Roman Catholic Holiday" | Sarah Pia Anderson | Story by : Marlane Meyer & Paul Leland; Teleplay by : Marlane Meyer | October 16, 1997 | 5K05 |
Father Ray takes a day off and runs into a high school classmate (John Cygan) at a pick-up basketball game; Father Leo struggles with feeling unneeded after a series of disappointments; Sidney, having recently separated from his wife Frances (Cindy Katz), makes a connection with a location scout (Judith Hoag) seeking to use St. Thomas to film a horror movie.
| 6 | "Spirit and Substance" | Arvin Brown | Story by : Marlane Meyer & Paul Leland; Teleplay by : Marlane Meyer | October 23, 1997 | 5K06 |
Disheartened by Father Leo's absence, Father Ray finds it mysteriously difficult to get in touch with God, while his old flame Gemma (Wendy Gazelle) is a constant presence as she plans St. Thomas' upcoming Halloween bash. Meanwhile, Sister Maureen attempts to help a traumatized parishioner (Donna Murphy) who's turned against God, while J.A. worries that his teenage cousin is working for a local drug dealer.
| 7 | "Calling" | Robert M. Young | Jason Cahill | November 6, 1997 | 5K07 |
After helping to commit a robbery, Father Ray's ex-con brother Michael (Jeff Kober) shows up at the rectory asking for a place to stay. Meanwhile, a traditionalist seminarian (David Norona) arrives to shadow Father Eric for a few days; and Sister Maureen is invited to preach at the local Episcopalian church.
| 8 | "Speaking in Tongues" | John Coles | Sandy Kroopf | November 13, 1997 | 5K08 |
Father Ray questions his belief in miracles while trying to help a young man (John Cameron Mitchell) hospitalized for speaking in tongues and who claims to have visions. Meanwhile, Father Eric has feelings for a new musician (Bess Meyer) working at St. Thomas.
| 9 | "A Bloody Miracle" | Tom Moore | Jan Oxenberg | November 29, 1997 | 5K09 |
After a young woman is shot in front of the church, her blood appears to form an image of Jesus. While everyone grapples with whether this is truly a miracle or not, Father Ray tries to stop the wounded girl's brother from carrying out a vendetta. Meanwhile, Father Leo returns to St. Thomas.
| 10 | "House of Rage" | Joan Tewkesbury | Marlane Meyer | December 11, 1997 | 5K10 |
Father Ray tries to help a couple in the parish (Laila Robins and Joseph Kell) who are experiencing marital difficulties. Meanwhile, their adopted son is escaping their arguments by drinking; and a recently deceased elderly couple bequeath their home to St. Thomas.
| 11 | "Hodie Christus Natus Est" | David Manson | Story by : Bill Cain & Michael Breault; Teleplay by : Michael Breault | December 18, 1997 | 5K11 |
Father Ray declares St. Thomas a sanctuary to a couple of Salvadoran refugees (Yareli Arizmendi and Ramon Franco) on Christmas Eve. Meanwhile, Father Eric is nervous about his parents coming to Christmas Mass; and Sister Mo is frustrated by her limited role as a woman in the church.
| 12 | "Signs and Words" | Robert Allan Ackerman | Lee Blessing & Jeanne Blake | January 17, 1998 | 5K12 |
Father Ray is called on the carpet because of the trouble that occurred on Christmas Eve, and he's not happy with the bishop's decision to assign Father Martin Briggs (David Marshall Grant) to co-pastor with him and exert control over parish matters. Meanwhile, a young black parishioner (Theodore Borders) makes a bold statement at the church and resists his mother's (Lorraine Toussaint) insistence that he be confirmed in the Catholic faith.
| 13 | "A Nun's Story" | Jan Egleson | Story by : Jan Oxenberg; Teleplay by : Richard Kramer & Jan Oxenberg | January 24, 1998 | 5K13 |
Sister Maureen prepares to be the Maid of Honor at the wedding of a longtime friend (Talia Balsam). While also planning the funeral of her elderly housemate Sister Sebastian and dealing with the pressure and indignity of Father Martin's (David Marshall Grant) staff reorganization, she begins to question her future in religious life.
| 14 | "Kindred Spirits" | Robert M. Young | Story by : Marlane Meyer & Gary Rieck; Teleplay by : Marlane Meyer | March 7, 1998 | 5K14 |
Father Ray and the staff grow steadily more unhappy with Father Martin (David Marshall Grant), who wants to close the soup kitchen. After learning that Father Martin has offered the Director of Religious Education position to Justine Madsen Judd, Sister Mo seeks another job. Meanwhile, Fr. Ray counsels a parishioner (John Posey) who is struggling with the news that his unborn child will have Down Syndrome.
| 15 | "The Coldest Night of the Year" | David Petrarca | Bill Cain & Michael Breault | March 14, 1998 | 5K15 |
Father Ray is caught in the middle of a family crisis after his ex-convict brother Michael (Jeff Kober) breaks into his parents' house and is shot and wounded by their father Vince (John Mahoney). Following this event, their mother Helen (Fionnula Flanagan) leaves home and comes to stay at the rectory. Meanwhile, St. Thomas opens its doors to the homeless on the coldest night of the year.
| 16 | "Holy Words" | Donna Deitch | Ann Lewis Hamilton | UNAIRED | 5K16 |
Father Ray prepares to marry an interfaith couple, a Catholic woman and a Jewish man (Kellie Waymire and Michael B. Silver), whose marriage is opposed by family members on both sides. He collaborates with a female Rabbi (Lisa Edelstein) to attempt to overcome the numerous obstacles leading up to the wedding ceremony.
| 17 | "Sex, God and Reality" | Joan Tewkesbury | Jan Oxenberg | UNAIRED | 5K17 |
Father Ray and Justine search the school for a stash of condoms. Meanwhile, Sidney and his wife Frances (Cindy Katz) go for counseling, and Rachel is attracted to an ex-con (Steven Martini) who's working at St. Thomas on a work-release program.
| 18 | "HIV Priest" | James Hayman | Story by : Paul Leland & Richard Kramer; Teleplay by : Richard Kramer | UNAIRED | 5K01 |
Father Ray provides support to his longtime friend Father Jesse O'Connell (John Michael Higgins), a priest who is secretly gay and has AIDS. Meanwhile, Sister Mo brings communion to a woman (Irma P. Hall) who has not left her home in years, and Father Eric plays basketball with students from the school in Father Ray's absence.
| 19 | "Sleeping Dogs" | Elodie Keene | Marlane Meyer | UNAIRED | 5K18 |
A man (Leland Orser) comes to confession at St. Thomas and tells Father Ray that Father Leo had sexually abused him years earlier. After the accusation becomes public, Father Ray urges Father Leo to take steps to defend himself, while Father Leo tries to remain open to what God is trying to accomplish through the ordeal.
| 20 | "Felix Culpa" | Robert Allan Ackerman | Bill Cain & Cyrus Yavneh | UNAIRED | 5K19 |
As the St. Thomas staff prepares for Easter, Father Martin (David Marshall Grant) wants to close St. Thomas, Father Ray seeks counseling as he questions his faith, an elderly woman (Maxine Stuart) is eager to be baptized at the Easter Vigil Mass, and a mistake by Father Eric results in a fire which almost destroys the church.

== Production ==
The show was created by David Manson and Bill Cain. Manson had befriended Cain, a Jesuit priest and playwright, and wrote the pilot episode with him. Cain chose to be credited under the pseudonym "Paul Leland" in order to “create some separation" and avoid the perception that he was "writing as an official voice of the church.” Cain said that intention for the show was to "depict genuine people struggling to be faithful to the church, something that is no more easy to do than to raise a family." Michael Breault, a Jesuit brother, also served as a consultant for the series.

The pilot episode was filmed in Toronto. The rest of the series was filmed in Los Angeles, where the Anglican Lutheran Church in the Pico-Union district was used for exterior shots of the fictional St. Thomas Church. The sanctuary of Angelica was also used to represent the sanctuary of a fellow clergyman in one of the episodes.

== Release ==
Nothing Sacred premiered on September 18, 1997, at 8:00pm/7c on ABC.

=== Broadcast history ===
- Thursdays 8:00 p.m. (September 18, 1997 – December 18, 1997)
- Saturdays 8:00 p.m. (January 17, 1998 – March 14, 1998)

== Controversy ==
In 1997, the Catholic League, and board of advisory member Alan Keyes, specifically, declared the show a "sacrilege" according to one commentator, who also quoted Keyes as calling it "propaganda dressed up as entertainment, [infused with] the belief that there are no moral absolutes." Among the sponsors who withdrew ads from the show in response to the boycotts were Red Lobster, Ocean Spray, Chrysler-Plymouth, and American Honda Motors.

Other Catholic organizations and figures defended the show, with one cardinal citing how the program depicts the "human struggles that people bring to their parishes.” The Tidings, the newspaper of the Archdiocese of Los Angeles, published an editorial in support of the series. A group of more than 100 priests, nuns, and bishops also took out an advertisement in a November 1997 issue of the magazine Advertising Age, criticizing the Catholic League's boycott stance and urging advertisers to support the show.

Despite the backlash and the show's low viewership, ABC announced plans in November to order more episodes because of the show's quality and critical acclaim. However, the episode "HIV Priest", which was originally supposed to air as the second episode, was not broadcast and ultimately went unaired. The episode concerned a storyline about a priest who contracted AIDS.

== Cancelation ==
The series was initially aired in a competitive time slot, going up against popular sitcom Friends on Thursday nights. In the series' second week, it ranked 92nd out of 114 network shows. ABC preempted the series for the network's November sweeps period and later moved the show to a Saturday night airtime.

The series was officially canceled after the March 14, 1998 episode, leaving five completed episodes unaired. Four of these unaired episodes were screened at a two-night event at a New York fundraiser in May 1999.

== Reception ==
Nothing Sacred received praise for its writing, acting, and examination of modern faith. On review aggregate site Rotten Tomatoes, Nothing Sacred has an approval rating of 71% based on 21 critics' reviews. The site's consensus reads, "Nothing Sacred is an inquisitive study of religion in the modern world, with an appealing Kevin Anderson providing solid eloquence even when the series feels too self-satisfied in its sermon."

David Wild of Rolling Stone called it "the best new show" of the fall and said "it's enough to give you faith in ABC." Ken Tucker of Entertainment Weekly gave the series a grade of A−, writing "True to its title, Sacred holds neither political nor religious correctness as sacrosanct. It makes Roman Catholic policy clear, then shows how policy can play out in messy lives." Caryn James of The New York Times also praised the show, stating "it is set above [other new shows] by the thoughtfulness of its writing, its ambiguity, its refusal to preach. Though the series offers a complex study of faith in the real world, its great strength is that it works as engaging human drama, apart from religious concerns."

Ray Richmond of Variety was less positive, criticizing the show for its lack of realism and writing, "Smart though often flippant, 'Nothing Sacred' is gutsy but a bit too enamored of its envelope-pushing sense of rebellion." Walter Kirn of Slate called the show "smug" and "just more phony Hollywood iconoclasm."

In a retrospective review in 2020, Catholic magazine America opined, "Here was a profoundly Catholic show that laid bare the fault lines of the church while capturing the beauty of belief. It should have been celebrated."

== Awards and nominations ==
| Year | Award | Result | Category | Recipient |
|---|---|---|---|---|
| 1998 | ALMA Award | Nominated | Outstanding Actor in a Drama Series | José Zúñiga |
| 1998 | ALMA Award | Nominated | Outstanding Drama Series | - |
| 1998 | Art Directors Guild | Nominated | Excellence in Production Design Award (Television Series) | Cate Bangs and Michael Baugh |
| 1998 | Emmy Award | Nominated | Outstanding Main Title Theme Music | Mark Isham |
| 1998 | Emmy Award | Nominated | Outstanding Art Direction for a Series | Cate Bangs, Michael Baugh, and William Vail (For episode "Hodie Christus Natus Est") |
| 1998 | Golden Globe Awards | Nominated | Best Performance by an Actor in a TV-Series - Drama | Kevin Anderson |
| 1998 | Humanitas Prize | Won | 60 Minute Category | Bill Cain |
| 1998 | Peabody Award | Won | - | - |
| 1998 | PGA Awards | Nominated | Television Producer of the Year Award in Episodic | David Manson |
| 1998 | Television Critics Association Awards | Nominated | Program of the Year | |
| 1998 | Television Critics Association Awards | Nominated | Outstanding New Program of the Year | |
| 1998 | Television Critics Association Awards | Nominated | Individual Achievement in Drama | Kevin Anderson |
| 1998 | Viewers for Quality Television Awards | Nominated | Best Supporting Actress in a Quality Drama Series | Ann Dowd |
| 1998 | Viewers for Quality Television Awards | Nominated | Best Actor in a Quality Drama Series | Kevin Anderson |
| 1998 | Viewers for Quality Television Awards | Won | Founder's Award | David Manson |
| 1998 | YoungStar Award | Nominated | Best Performance by a Young Actress in a Drama TV Series | Erika Christensen |
| 1999 | Writers Guild of America Award | Won | Episodic Drama | Bill Cain (For episode "Proofs for the Existence of God") |
| 1999 | Young Artist Award | Nominated | Best Performance in a TV Drama Series - Guest Starring Young Actress | Kimberly Cullum |
