= David Manson (producer) =

American film producer

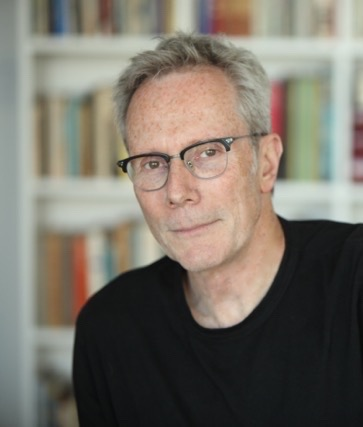
- Born: 1952 (age 73–74); New York City, U.S.

David Manson (born 1952) is an American film and television producer, screenwriter and director.

He is perhaps best known for his work on a trio of acclaimed Netflix series: House of Cards, Bloodline, and Ozark, for which he has received multiple Emmy Award and Writers Guild Award nominations.

== Early life ==
Manson was born in New York City to two musicians who had met as students at the Juilliard School. His father, Eddy Manson (né Eddy Lawrence Manson; 1919–1996), a harmonica virtuoso, moved the family to Los Angeles in 1965 to pursue his career as a film composer.

Manson attended the University of California, Santa Cruz on full scholarship before transferring to the University of California, Irvine, where he graduated magna cum laude.

== Career ==
Manson began his career in the theater and worked in various capacities for such venues as the Mark Taper Forum, Playwrights Horizon and the Manhattan Theater Club.

He started in the film business at Dick Berg's Stonehenge Productions where he produced his first film, The Spell (1977), for NBC, at the age of twenty-four. As Senior Vice President of Stonehenge, he produced several movies and miniseries including the first major television miniseries about Vietnam, A Rumor of War (1980), which The New York Times called "unusually ambitious and admirable" and the Washington Post referred to "as true as a movie is going to get".

In 1980, Manson formed his own company, Sarabande Productions, aimed at creating a platform for prestigious writers. He has since worked with Pulitzer Prize winners including Michael Chabon, Donald Margulies and Jules Feiffer, and acclaimed screenwriters such as Joan Tewkesbury, Barbara Turner, John Sacret Young, and National Book Award recipient Denis Johnson.

In features, he executive-produced and developed the Cannes Film Festival Special Jury Prize Winner Birdy (1984) starring Matthew Modine and Nicolas Cage. He then produced the Sting documentary, Bring On the Night (1985), directed by Michael Apted, which earned a Grammy Award for best long form video; he also executive-produced The Cemetery Club (1993), starring Ellen Burstyn, and produced the Drew Barrymore film, Mad Love (1995), both for Disney/Touchstone Pictures where his company was housed for several years.

Sarabande has also inked overall deals with MGM/UA, Sony, 20th Century Fox, FX Productions, and most recently Paramount Television Studios. Through the 1980s and 1990s, Manson, through Sarabande, executive-produced a number of television movies, including Rising Son (1990) starring Matt Damon in his first major role, the Christopher Award-winning NBC film, Eye on the Sparrow (1987), and Nightjohn (1996), directed by Charles Burnett, which was the recipient of a Special Citation Award from the National Society of Film Critics and which The New Yorker named the best American movie of the year.

Manson entered into the series business as co-creator/executive producer of Against the Law (1990) for FOX and made his directorial debut with the ABC television movie, Those Secrets (1992). He then co-created, produced, and directed the controversial drama, Nothing Sacred (1997), about an irreverent Catholic priest, which was the subject of an advertiser boycott instituted by the conservative pressure group, The Catholic League. The series won not only the Peabody Award, but also a Humanitas Award, the Writers Guild Award, and the Viewers for Quality Television Founders Award.

Later in the 1990s, he produced several films with his wife, writer/producer Arla Sorkin Manson, including the highly rated CBS telefilm, The Wedding Dress (2001). He also executive-produced two films for TNT: Thicker Than Blood (1998) with Mickey Rourke, based on Bill Cain's award-winning play, Stand-Up Tragedy; and Baby (2000), starring Farrah Fawcett and Keith Carradine, for which Manson received his first Writers Guild Award nomination. After 2000, Manson focused more on showrunning television series. He served as a consulting producer/writer on the hit HBO series, Big Love (2006), was the showrunner on the FX series, Thief (2006), starring the Emmy Award-winning Andre Braugher, and created, wrote, directed and executive produced the EMT drama, Saved (2006), for TNT.

Manson was the showrunner and wrote several episodes of the FOX series New Amsterdam (2008), directed multiple episodes of Law & Order: Criminal Intent (2009), and then executive-produced a pilot for FX, Outlaw Country (2011), starring Mary Steenburgen and John Hawkes.

In 2013, Manson became co-showrunner on the celebrated series, House of Cards, starring Kevin Spacey and Robin Wright. He received Golden Globe Award, Writers Guild Award, and Emmy Award nominations for his work. This began an association with Netflix which included executive producing/writing on both the critically hailed Kyle Chandler series, Bloodline, and the hit series, Ozark, starring Jason Bateman and Laura Linney, for which he received Emmy Award and Writers Guild Award nominations.

More recently, he was an executive producer/writer on the Apple TV+ series, Shantaram, starring Charlie Hunnam, based on Gregory Roberts’ best-selling novel.

| Name | TV/Film | Year | Position | Awards | Notes |
|---|---|---|---|---|---|
| Shantaram | TV | 2022 | Executive Producer/Writer | | |
| Ozark | TV | 2017-2018 | Executive Producer/Writer | Emmy Nomination: Outstanding Drama Series, Writers Guild Award Nomination: Episodic Drama (The Precious Blood of Jesus), Producers Guild Nomination: Outstanding Producer of Episodic Television, Drama | |
| Bloodline | TV | 2015-2017 | Executive Producer/Writer/Director | | |
| Hoke | TV | 2014 | Executive Producer | | |
| House of Cards | TV | 2013 | Executive Producer/Writer | Emmy Nomination: Outstanding Drama Series, Golden Globe Nomination: Best Television Series, Drama, Producers Guild Nomination: Best Drama, Writers Guild Nomination: Best Drama | |
| The Divide | TV | 2012 | Executive Producer/Writer | | |
| Outlaw Country | TV | 2011 | Executive Producer | | |
| Damages | TV | 2011 | Consulting Producer | | |
| Law & Order: Criminal Intent | TV | 2009 | Director | | |
| Life | TV | 2009 | Consulting Producer/Writer | | |
| New Amsterdam | TV | 2008 | Executive Producer/Writer | | |
| Saved | TV | 2006 | Creator/Executive Producer/Writer/Director | | |
| Thief | TV | 2006 | Executive Producer/Writer | | |
| Big Love | TV | 2006 | Consulting Producer/Writer | Golden Globe Nomination: Best Television Series, Drama | |
| John Doe | TV | 2003 | Consulting Producer/Writer | | |
| The Wedding Dress | Film | 2001 | Executive Producer | | |
| Baby | Film | 2000 | Executive Producer/Writer | Writers Guild Nomination, Christopher Award | |
| Mind Games | Film | 1998 | Executive Producer | | |
| Thicker Than Blood | Film | 1998 | Executive Producer | ALMA Award | |
| Nothing Sacred | TV | 1997–1998 | Co-Creator/Executive Producer/Writer/Director | Peabody Award, Humanitas Award, Producers Guild Nomination, Viewers for Quality Television: Founders Award | |
| Nightjohn | Film | 1997 | Executive Producer | National Society of Film Critics: Special Citation | |
| Mad Love | Film | 1995 | Producer | | |
| Original Sins | Film | 1995 | Executive Producer | | |
| The Cemetery Club | Film | 1993 | Executive Producer | | |
| Those Secrets | Film | 1992 | Executive Producer/Director | | |
| Against The Law | TV | 1990–1991 | Co-Creator/Executive Producer/Writer | | |
| Rising Son | Film | 1990 | Executive Producer | | |
| Eye on the Sparrow | Film | 1987 | Executive Producer | Christopher Award | |
| The King of Love | Film | 1987 | Executive Producer | | |
| Bring On the Night | Film | 1985 | Producer | Grammy Award: Best Long Form Video | |
| Birdy | Film | 1984 | Executive Producer | Cannes Film Festival: Special Jury Prize | |
| Best Kept Secrets | Film | 1984 | Producer | | |
| Sessions | Film | 1983 | Producer | | |
| A Rumor of War | TV | 1980 | Producer | | |
| The Word | TV | 1978 | Producer | | |
| A Love Affair: The Eleanor and Lou Gehrig Story | Film | 1978 | Producer | | |
| Night Cries | Film | 1978 | Producer | | |
| The Spell | Film | 1977 | Producer | | |
