= Daniel Zelman =

American actor, screenwriter, television producer, and director

- Born: Daniel Luke Zelman; June 16, 1967 (age 59); New York, U.S.
- Education: Harvard University (BFA); New York University (MFA)
- Occupations: Television producer, screenwriter, actor, television director
- Spouse: Debra Messing (m. 2000; div. 2016)
- Children: 1
- Relatives: Aaron Zelman (brother)

Daniel Luke Zelman (born June 16, 1967) is an American actor, screenwriter, television producer, and director.

== Early life and education ==
Zelman was born in New York. He earned a Bachelor of Fine Arts from Harvard University in 1990 and a Master of Fine Arts from New York University Tisch School of the Arts in 1993. He is Jewish.

== Career ==
Zelman is an executive producer on the FX drama series Damages, which he co-created with Todd A. Kessler and Glenn Kessler. Todd Kessler, Glenn Kessler, and Zelman were nominated for an Emmy Award for Outstanding Writing for a Drama Series for their work on the pilot episode of Damages, titled "Get Me A Lawyer". He also wrote They Nest, Anacondas: The Hunt for the Blood Orchid, and Fool's Gold.

== Personal life ==
In 1990, Zelman met Debra Messing at New York University. Zelman and Messing married on September 3, 2000, and have a son, Roman Walker Zelman, who was born on April 7, 2004. On December 20, 2011, it was announced that Zelman and Messing were ending their eleven-year marriage. Messing filed for divorce on June 5, 2012. The divorce was officially completed on March 1, 2016.

== Filmography ==
=== Acting credits ===
==== Film ====
Year	Title	Role	Notes
1995	Let It Be Me	Gabriel's Friend	
1996	Milk & Money	Josh	
2000	What Lies Beneath	PhD Student #4	

==== Television ====
Year	Title	Role	Notes
1993	Law & Order	Bruce Abelson	Episode: "Black Tie"
1995	One Life to Live	Keith	Episode #1.6860
1996, 2017	Ned and Stacey	Dave	2 episodes
1997	Prison of Secrets	Prison Spokesman	Television film
1997	Weird Science	Soldier	Episode: "I, Chettus"
2000	The Practice	Kevin Macklin	Episode: "Friends and Ex-Lovers"

=== Writing, directing and producing credits ===
==== Film ====
Year	Title	Writer	Producer	Notes
2000	They Nest	Yes	Co-producer	Television film
2004	Anacondas: The Hunt for the Blood Orchid	Yes	No	
2008	Fool's Gold	Yes	No	

==== Television ====
Year	Title	Creator	Writer	Director	Executive Producer	Notes
2008–2012	Damages	Yes	Yes	Yes	Yes	
2015–2017	Bloodline	Yes	Yes	Yes	Yes	
2018	Succession	No	No	No	Consulting	
