= Todd A. Kessler =

American screenwriter

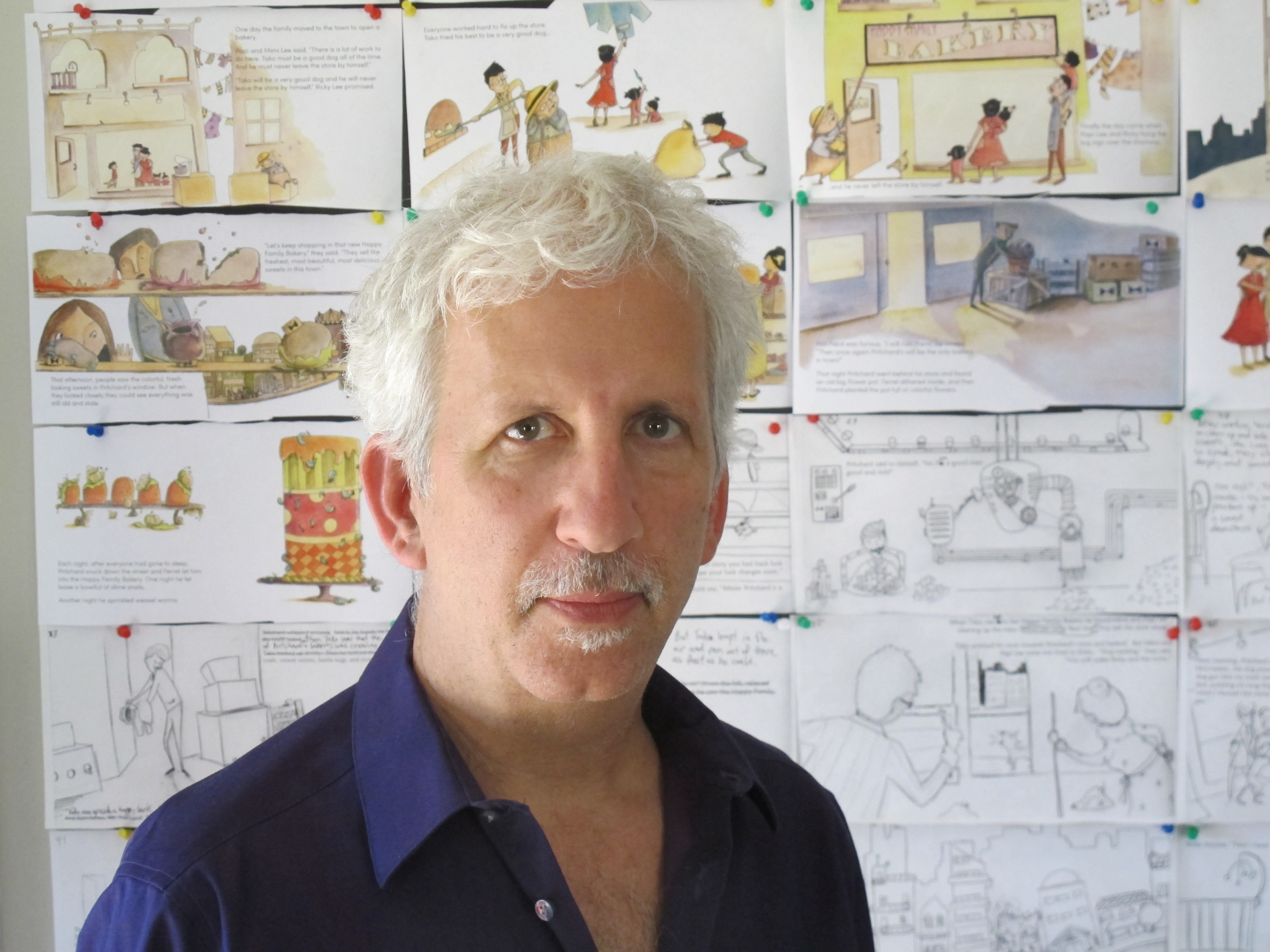
Image of Todd A. Kessler

Todd A. Kessler (born 1972) is an American screenwriter, playwright, television producer, and director.

== Education ==
After graduating from Cranbrook Kingswood School in 1990, Kessler graduated magna cum laude from Harvard University in 1994 with a bachelor's degree in dramatic literature and playwriting. He has twice been a visiting artist at Harvard, teaching screenwriting seminars.

== Career ==
Kessler began his career as a playwright working with David Rabe, moving into film and television when Spike Lee hired him as a screenwriter. Kessler wrote and produced the second and third seasons of HBO's The Sopranos, Michael Mann's Robbery Homicide Division, and the first season of NBC's Providence.

Kessler is credited with co-writing (with David Chase) the Sopranos season two finale, "Funhouse," widely lauded as one of the best episodes of the series. Despite his success on The Sopranos, Chase did not retain Kessler beyond season three, an experience Kessler described as "painful and formative." Kessler and Sopranos actor James Gandolfini became close friends during Kessler's time writing for the show.

Kessler was the co-creator and head writer of the FX drama series Damages, along with his older brother, Glenn Kessler, and Daniel Zelman. He has a small role in Damages as Perry the Doorman.

In 2015, Kessler's Kyle Chandler-led Netflix series, Bloodline, premiered. In 2016, it was cancelled and ended its run after its third season in 2017.

== Awards and nominations ==
Kessler has been nominated for several Primetime Emmy Awards. Todd Kessler, Glenn Kessler, and Daniel Zelman were nominated for an Emmy Award for Outstanding Writing for a Drama Series for their work on the Damages pilot episode "Get Me A Lawyer".

Kessler has been nominated for five Emmy Awards and three Golden Globe Awards.

== Filmography ==
Year	Title	Credited as				Notes
Year	Title	Writer	Producer	Director	Creator	Notes
1997	The Visitor	Yes	No	No	No	Co-wrote "Going Home"
1999	Providence	Yes	No	No	No	3 episodes, also executive story editor
2000–2001	The Sopranos	Yes	Yes	No	No	Wrote 5 episodes, also co-producer
2002–2003	Robbery Homicide Division	Yes	Yes	No	No	Supervising producer, wrote 5 episodes
2007–2012	Damages	Yes	Executive	Yes	Co-creator	Wrote 25 episodes and directed 7 episodes
2015–2017	Bloodline	Yes	Executive	Yes	Co-creator	Wrote 8 episodes and directed 4 episodes
2024–present	The New Look	Yes	Executive	Yes	Yes	Wrote 8 episodes and directed 2 episodes
