= Glenn Kessler (screenwriter) =

American screenwriter, television producer, actor, and director

- Born: April 6, 1970 (age 56); Michigan
- Education: Harvard University (BA); New York University (MFA)
- Occupations: Screenwriter, television producer, actor, television director
- Spouse: Julie Claire
- Children: 3
- Family: Todd A. Kessler (younger brother)

Glenn Kessler (born April 6, 1970) is an American screenwriter, television producer, actor, and director.

== Early life and education ==
Kessler grew up in the suburbs of Detroit suburb and graduated from the Cranbrook Kingswood School in Bloomfield Hills in 1988. Later he attended Harvard University, graduating in 1992 and then New York University's Graduate Acting Program at the Tisch School of the Arts, graduating in 1997.

== Career ==
He is the co-creator and executive producer of the Golden Globe award-winning FX drama series Damages along with his younger brother, Todd A. Kessler, and Daniel Zelman. He also stars on the show as FBI agent Werner. The three creators were nominated for an Emmy Award for Outstanding Writing for a Drama Series for their work on the Damages pilot episode "Get Me A Lawyer".

In 2015, the Kessler brothers and Zelman created the Netflix original series, Bloodline. The show was cancelled in 2016, and ended its run after its third season, which aired in 2017.

== Personal life ==
He has been married to actress Julie Claire since 2010 and they have three children.
