= List of Nurse Jackie episodes =

American medical comedy-drama series

Nurse Jackie, an American medical comedy-drama series created by Evan Dunsky, Liz Brixius, and Linda Wallem, premiered on Showtime on June 8, 2009. The series stars Edie Falco as title character Jackie Peyton, a nurse addicted to painkillers while working in the emergency ward at All Saints' Hospital in New York City. During the course of the series, 80 episodes of Nurse Jackie aired over seven seasons, between June 8, 2009, and June 28, 2015.

== Series overview ==
Season	Episodes	Originally released	
Season	Episodes	First released	Last released
1	12	June 8, 2009	August 24, 2009
2	12	March 22, 2010	June 7, 2010
3	12	March 28, 2011	June 20, 2011
4	10	April 8, 2012	June 17, 2012
5	10	April 14, 2013	June 16, 2013
6	12	April 13, 2014	June 29, 2014
7	12	April 12, 2015	June 28, 2015

== Episodes ==
=== Season 1 (2009) ===
No. overall	No. in season	Title	Directed by	Written by	Original release date	US viewers (millions)
1	1	"Pilot"	Allen Coulter	Liz Brixius & Linda Wallem and Evan Dunsky	June 8, 2009	1.01
Veteran emergency room nurse Jackie Peyton navigates the traffic of Manhattan's All Saints Hospital while hiding a subtle drug addiction and making tough and sometimes unethical decisions for the "good" of her patients. Clashing with cocky young surgeon Dr. Fitch "Coop" Cooper and begrudgingly training naïve and perky new nurse Zoey, Jackie maintains a romantic relationship with pharmacist Eddie to assure her ready access to prescription medication. When Coop's negligence causes a bike messenger to die, Jackie tries to make good of the patient's senseless death by forging an organ donor authorization for him. Jackie also punishes a violent sociopath with diplomatic immunity by flushing his severed ear down the toilet. At the end of her shift, Jackie returns home, where it is revealed that she has a husband, Kevin, and two young daughters.
2	2	"Sweet 'n All"	Craig Zisk	Liz Brixius & Linda Wallem	June 15, 2009	1.10
Jackie brings Sweet 'n All packets laced with ground-up Percocet to get her through the day, but one of the packets is accidentally taken by the stern hospital administrator Gloria Akalitus. Zoey discovers the resurfaced flushed ear and gives it to Gloria. Upon being confronted, Jackie shifts the blame towards Zoey. All Saints nurse Mohammed "Momo" De La Cruz bonds with a patient whose oxygen tank exploded when she lit a cigarette. Jackie and Coop treat a child in a skateboard accident who was not wearing a helmet; Jackie is forced to swallow her pride and tell Coop that he had been right about diagnosing a patient's unlikely aneurysm.
3	3	"Chicken Soup"	Craig Zisk	Mark Hudis	June 22, 2009	N/A
Jackie and Kevin discuss their eldest daughter Grace's mounting anxiety, after which Jackie confides her concerns to her best friend Dr. Eleanor O'Hara. Jackie treats a dying man who refuses further treatment, instead choosing to treat his heart failure with chicken soup; Jackie allows the man to pass peacefully in the hospital with his wife, to Gloria's dismay. A couple from Ohio comes into the ER for a possible pregnancy, but Jackie discovers that the wife is actually going through withdrawal from Vicodin. Meanwhile, Zoey tries to work up the courage to ask for her new stethoscope back after Eleanor takes it, while Eddie faces the possibility of being replaced by an automated Pyxis dispensary.
4	4	"School Nurse"	Steve Buscemi	Christine Zander	June 29, 2009	N/A
Jackie and Kevin attend a school meeting to discuss Grace's psychological development, but Jackie grows defensive when the school nurse suggests prescribing anti-anxiety medication for Grace. Jackie, Momo and Eleanor treat an unconscious twin boy who has fallen off playground equipment; Momo is affected by the patient, lamenting the loss of his own twin brother, while Eleanor struggles to deal with the gushing, innocent gratitude of her young patient's twin brother after she saves the boy's life. Jackie buys a second cell phone after receiving multiple romantic texts from Eddie. Zoey, lamenting a day of "unexciting" cases being assigned to her, experiences her first patient death while treating an elderly woman with a DNR.
5	5	"Daffodil"	Steve Buscemi	Taii K. Austin	July 6, 2009	N/A
Jackie treats a ten-year-old girl caring for her lupus-stricken mother, and tries to buck the system to assist the girl when Gloria suggests calling social services. Male bonding between Eddie and Coop puts a damper on Jackie's usual mid-shift tryst in the pharmacy back-room, while Zoey fills in for Jackie as Eleanor's dinner date. Momo spends the night simultaneously deflecting the advances of diabetic nurse Thor, while enjoying the fringe benefits of Thor's crush on him. Gloria, exasperated by the staff's seeming-disregard for order and professionalism, accidentally tasers herself while trying to retrieve an unattended taser lying in the hallway.
6	6	"Tiny Bubbles"	Craig Zisk	Rick Cleveland	July 13, 2009	N/A
Jackie tries to convince Grace to transfer to private school. Paula, a fellow nurse and old friend of Jackie's, checks into the hospital with terminal lung cancer. Paula refuses to check into hospice and asks Jackie to help end her life; Jackie does so by secretly giving her morphine. Jackie is stunned when Paula admits that Eddie used to supply her with Percocet. Meanwhile, Coop's two mothers, Leslie and Maureen, arrive at the ER to admit Maureen for a gallbladder attack. Coop confides in Leslie about his struggles with Tourette's as a child, and admits that he loved Leslie more growing up; Leslie counters that she was the "fun mom" because Maureen deliberately wanted them to bond.
7	7	"Steak Knife"	Steve Buscemi	Nancy Fichman & Jennifer Hoppe	July 20, 2009	N/A
The staff at All Saints are forced to deal with a mentally ill man who shouts from his apartment window across the street and refers to himself as God. Eddie surprises Jackie with a bracelet for their first anniversary, but ends up giving it to Coop when she reacts poorly to the gift. A man is admitted to the ER with a steak knife in his chest, after an attack by the ex-husband of a woman he was dating for the first time. Eleanor has a personal crisis with her family, leading Jackie to invite her to spend the night at her house. Gloria takes charge of a foundling abandoned at the nurses' station and tries to figure out who the baby belongs to.
8	8	"Pupil"	Steve Buscemi	Liz Flahive	July 27, 2009	0.919
When the emergency room is four nurses short, Gloria introduces Jackie to Sam, a dimwitted temp nurse. Zoey correctly deduces that Sam is abusing drugs and informs Jackie, who confronts Sam and asks him to leave; she is stunned when he calls her out on her hypocrisy. Coop treats an older woman with a head wound, who expresses interest in setting him up with her daughter Melissa. Gloria still has the foundling infant left at the hospital. Grace experiences a panic attack at her new private school and calls Jackie, who inadvertently reveals to Coop that she has a child while answering the call. Coop later reveals the news to Eddie, who confronts Jackie; she apologizes to Eddie for not telling him about her daughter, but does not reveal that she is married.
9	9	"Nosebleed"	Paul Feig	John Hilary Shepherd	August 3, 2009	1.36
While admitting a homeless patient she has treated before, Jackie experiences a drug-induced nosebleed. Jackie criticizes Zoey when the homeless patient undergoes a foot amputation, but Zoey responds that Jackie had previously instructed her to underserve the patient during an earlier visit. Jackie denies this and later rips out a page out of Zoey's notebook that supports Zoey's account. Gloria considers adopting the foundling infant, but reluctantly gives the infant back to the teenage couple who have come forward to reclaim their child. Jackie is upset when Eleanor reveals that she had told her sister in Paris about Jackie's affair with Eddie. Jackie and Coop treat a brain dead patient who was in a car accident, and Jackie forges an organ donation form in Coop's name while he is preoccupied.
10	10	"Ring Finger"	Paul Feig	Liz Brixius	August 10, 2009	N/A
Jackie begins mother-daughter dance lessons with Grace. Returning to work, Jackie is unable to remove her wedding ring from her finger, and she asks Eleanor to help cut the ring off with a bone saw. A young man is brought into the ER with cardiac arrest, and Jackie uses his cell phone to inform his girlfriend about his death. Coop threatens to report Jackie over the fake organ donor card, but Jackie manipulates Coop by kissing him to keep him distracted. Zoey accidentally walks in on Jackie and Eddie having sex in the pharmacy back-room. Jackie deliberately breaks her finger with a hammer in order to cover up the broken wedding ring to Kevin.
11	11	"Pill O-Matix"	Scott Ellis	Rick Cleveland	August 17, 2009	1.07
Jackie gets tossed out of the mother-daughter dance lessons after clashing with Ginny, a mother whom she knew from her high school days. Coop has begun a relationship with Melissa, but ultimately decides to break up with her, having fallen in love with Jackie after their kiss. Momo treats a young man with a spider trapped in his ear. Neil Nutterman, a well-known film critic, is admitted for a broken arm, but Zoey administers the wrong dose of a painkiller, which causes Neil to fall into a coma. Eddie is replaced by the Pill-O-Matix, an automatic pill dispensing machine, and he gives Jackie 80 milligram tabs of Oxycontin as a parting gift, expressing an interest in pursuing their relationship further. At the end of the episode, Jackie heads to Kevin's bar and tenderly embraces her family; a devastated Eddie is revealed to have been watching from the bar window.
12	12	"Health Care and Cinema"	Scott Ellis	Liz Brixius & Linda Wallem	August 24, 2009	0.992
Kevin invites Jackie to a midnight rendezvous in order to give her a new wedding ring. Following Neil's coma incident, Gloria attempts to launch an investigation and tries to get an official statement from Jackie and Zoey, but her plans are derailed after she gets stuck inside the hospital elevator. Neil eventually wakes up from his coma, but Zoey discovers that his tastes have radically changed. Eleanor arranges to secretly admit her dead mother into the hospital for a post mortem, and asks Jackie to be there with her for comfort. Eddie arrives at Kevin's bar and deliberately constructs a friendship with Kevin, asking him questions about his wife and family. Later, Eddie arrives at All Saints and drunkenly confronts the staff before informing Jackie that he met Kevin. Stunned and distraught, Jackie orders three vials of morphine from the Pill-O-Matix and downs them in an empty examination room.

=== Season 2 (2010) ===
No. overall	No. in season	Title	Directed by	Written by	Original release date	US viewers (millions)
13	1	"Comfort Food"	Paul Feig	Linda Wallem & Liz Brixius	March 22, 2010	1.08
Three months later, Jackie tries to reconnect with her family while continuing to ignore Eddie's calls. At the hospital, Gloria is concerned with the growing disappearance of drugs and asks Jackie to train the staff on how to properly use the Pill-O-Matix. Jackie and Coop clash while treating a deaf woman who has lost her fingers, after which Coop turns to Gloria to file a formal complaint against her for insubordination. Eleanor, having recently acquired her mother's estate, expresses interest in helping Jackie set up a college fund for Grace and Fiona. Jackie is dismayed to learn that Gloria has re-hired Sam, who has successfully completed a drug rehabilitation program, as a registered nurse. In an attempt to gain Jackie's attention, Eddie purposely overdoses on Xanax and is admitted into the ER.
14	2	"Twitter"	Paul Feig	Mark Hudis	March 29, 2010	0.686
Mourning her mother's death, Eleanor shows up after a night of clubbing, and Jackie covers for her while she comes down from Ecstasy. Worried about Grace's escalating anxiety, Jackie surreptitiously asks Gloria for a pediatric psych referral. Eddie visits the bar and continues his friendship with Kevin, while Zoey treats God and talks him through an identity crisis. Jackie drops a package of pills in front of Sam, who presses her about the hospital's policy on lost drugs. Jackie is irritated by Coop, who has taken to Twitter as a way to vent. While treating a young boy with a serious respiratory problem, Jackie cuts through red tape to speed up the boy's diagnosis, and sends the family away after receiving the boy's preliminary results. Later, Coop berates Jackie for her actions, as the boy's final results reveal that he has cystic fibrosis.
15	3	"Candyland"	Alan Taylor	Rick Cleveland	April 5, 2010	0.525
Grace has a playdate with Ginny's daughter Kaitlyn, who catches Jackie snorting drugs in the basement. Jackie approaches Kevin about Eleanor's offer to set up a college fund for Grace and Fiona, but Kevin refuses to take the money. Coop makes New York Magazine's Top 25 Doctors list, giving him reason to gloat and flabbergasting most of the staff, particularly Eleanor and Gloria. Coop also visits Eddie, who has recovered from his overdose and now works at a local pharmacy. The staff treat a man whose testicles have migrated after being mauled by a Great Dane, as well as a patient suffering second-degree burns from an exploding cell phone. After her shift, Jackie returns home and discovers that Kevin has invited Eddie over.
16	4	"Apple Bong"	Alan Taylor	Christine Zander	April 12, 2010	0.682
Following Eddie's intrusion into her home life, Jackie visits Eddie at his pharmacy to lambast him, but he expresses interest in resuming their relationship. Eleanor discovers that Sam is a sex addict, and the two have sex in the hospital chapel; Eleanor later tells Jackie that she slept with Sam to give him an outlet to channel his addiction without turning to drugs. Jackie and Coop treat a cancer patient who isn't responding well to chemotherapy, and Coop strongly reprimands Jackie for recommending marijuana for the pain. Jackie privately teaches the patient how to make an apple bong and shows up at his apartment to give him pot brownies. While treating a young boy suffering from an allergic reaction, Zoey illegally intubates the boy without a doctor to save his life; Eleanor covers for Zoey and commends her work. Later, Zoey reveals to Jackie that she thinks she is pregnant.
17	5	"Caregiver"	Adam Bernstein	Liz Brixius	April 19, 2010	0.584
Jackie gets into an argument with Kevin after discovering that he took their daughters on an outing with Kaitlyn and Ginny. In an effort to resolve pill shortages, Gloria posts a security guard by the Pill-O-Matix, and she reluctantly approaches Coop about being the public face of All Saints. Jackie treats a patient who is arrested for carrying an unlicensed gun, and she also reports the negligent caregiver of an elderly patient with dementia to the police. Eleanor reveals to Jackie that she used to be in a relationship with Sarah Khori, an international TV news correspondent. Sam decides to cut things off with Eleanor, admitting that his girlfriend is back in town. Zoey contemplates her possible pregnancy while also declining the advances of Lenny, an EMT worker. Jackie calls Eddie to reconnect.
18	6	"Bleeding"	Adam Bernstein	Nancy Fichman & Jennifer Hoppe-House	April 26, 2010	0.917
Jackie resumes her sexual relationship with Eddie, but asks him to stop spending time with Kevin; Eddie ignores Jackie's requests and invites Kevin to play ping pong. Coop's advertisements for All Saints are plastered across the city, much to the disgust of Jackie and Eleanor. Jackie vandalizes the car of a wealthy businessman who drunkenly impaled her patient with an arrow. Sarah Khori makes a surprise visit to All Saints and rekindles her relationship with Eleanor, while Zoey happily announces that she is not pregnant after getting her period. With Eddie and the Pill-O-Matix becoming less reliable sources, Jackie finds an alternative way to get pills when a pharmaceutical company rep visits All Saints. Jackie allows Fiona to have a fake cast on her arm for her birthday.
19	7	"Silly String"	Paul Feig	Liz Flahive	May 3, 2010	0.739
Mrs. Sussman, the hospital's biggest donor, is brought into the ER, but refuses to continue funding after she is insulted by Coop, dismaying Gloria. When Mrs. Sussman dies from a stroke, Gloria proposes that Mrs. Sussman's dying wish was to reallocate money from the children's wing to the ER. Sarah asks Zoey to secretly treat her for a brown recluse spider bite. Jackie notices Sarah's philandering behavior and brings up her concerns to Eleanor, who ultimately decides to end their relationship. Jackie re-evaluates her affair with Eddie and temporarily breaks things off with him. When Fiona busts her lip open on her cast at home, Jackie gets Eleanor to stitch up Fiona in the kitchen, despite Kevin's objections that they go to the hospital. Later, Kevin lambasts Jackie for working too much and being tuned out at home, implying that Jackie is responsible for Grace's anxiety.
20	8	"Monkey Bits"	Paul Feig	Liz Brixius	May 10, 2010	0.675
Fiona's teacher suspects that she is being abused because of her cast and lip injury, leading Jackie and Eleanor to remove the fake cast in-class to prove her arm is not broken. Grace attends her first session with a psychiatrist. At All Saints, a determined man refuses to leave the emergency room until he says goodbye to his dying husband. Jackie comforts a patient with a gunshot wound by promising that she will be next to her when she wakes up from surgery; Jackie forgets to follow through on her promise, leading the patient to reprimand her post-surgery. Jackie comforts Eleanor over her break-up with Sarah, and suggests that it is possible for someone to love two people at once, likening her relationship with Eddie and Kevin. Coop reunites with his friend Georgia and decides to set her up on a date with Eddie; Jackie is dismayed when Eddie takes Georgia to Kevin's bar.
21	9	"P.O. Box"	Paul Feig	Mark Hudis	May 17, 2010	0.729
Jackie wants to transfer Fiona to Grace's private school; Kevin is open to the idea, but continues to refuse Eleanor's money. Upon receiving a $600 credit card bill for prescription purchases, Jackie tells Eleanor that Kevin has agreed to set up an education fund for Fiona, intending to use the money to pay off her debt. Jackie also sets up a personal P.O. box to keep her credit card a secret. Frustrated with the Pill-O-Matix, Gloria invites Eddie to come back as the hospital's pharmacist. After allowing Sam to clock out for an hour to receive his six-month chip, Jackie intentionally reports him to Gloria, who puts Sam on probation. While treating a patient, Zoey reprimands Coop, who responds by involuntarily touching her breast; Lenny, unaware of Coop's Tourette's, comes to Zoey's defense and punches Coop. Jackie and Kevin discover that Grace is pulling her hair out from stress.
22	10	"Sleeping Dogs"	Paul Feig	Liz Brixius	May 24, 2010	0.670
Eddie returns to All Saints as the hospital's pharmacist. The staff treat Marco Prince, a former linebacker who is diagnosed with early on-set dementia; Gloria tries to help Marco's wife by suggesting they get divorced for financial reasons, as he could qualify for Medicaid without her income. Zoey considers hooking up with Lenny, but Jackie cautions her about fooling around with co-workers. Sam invites Coop to spend time with his friends after work, during which Coop bonds with Sam's girlfriend. Jackie reveals her back pain to Eleanor, who agrees to give Jackie a prescription for Oxycontin after viewing her MRI. Later, Eleanor visits the hospital's orthopaedic department and is shocked to discover that Jackie has falsified her MRI. While walking home from work, Jackie tends to a man having a seizure. Jackie discovers baggies of pills in the man's pockets and steals them while waiting for paramedics to arrive.
23	11	"What the Day Brings"	Paul Feig	Rick Cleveland	May 31, 2010	N/A
Jackie evades Eleanor's questions about her fake MRI and instead decides to call off early to go on a road trip upstate with Kevin and the girls. Jackie hides a stash of pills in a floss container to get her through the vacation, but she misplaces the container when it falls out of her pocket in the car. Unable to find her pill stash, Jackie unravels and begins to experience withdrawal for the remainder of the trip; she also continues to ignore Eleanor's calls. At All Saints, Coop bonds with a patient who has Tourette's, and also reveals to Eddie that he had sex with Sam's girlfriend. The drug dealer whom Jackie helped while he had a seizure arrives at the hospital looking for Jackie. While staying at a bed and breakfast upstate, Jackie convinces Kevin to cut their trip early. On the journey back, Fiona answers Eleanor's phone call to Jackie; Eleanor asks Fiona about her new school, causing Jackie to aggressively ask for the phone back. Realizing that Jackie took Eleanor's money, Kevin pulls over and storms out of the car.
24	12	"Years of Service"	Paul Feig	Liz Brixius & Linda Wallem	June 7, 2010	0.858
Jackie decides to drive off without Kevin, who calls Eddie for a ride home. When Kevin arrives home, Jackie admits that she took the money and tearfully claims that she took it to help the family, pointing out their financial problems. The following morning, Kevin finds Jackie's P.O. key and becomes suspicious. At All Saints, Jackie reconciles with Eleanor, who decides to overlook Jackie's reliance on pills. Zoey begins a fling with Lenny and gifts him a pocket watch. Jackie is physically confronted by the drug dealer whom she ripped off, but Thor tackles the man, knocking him out unconscious. Sam's girlfriend breaks up with him, and Sam punches Coop after discovering that he slept with her. When Sam goes on a bender, Jackie and Thor take him to the basement and tap-dance to keep him awake. Kevin visits the post office and discovers Jackie's credit card bill for prescriptions; he meets with Eleanor to discuss his findings. At the end of the episode, Jackie returns home and discovers that Kevin and Eleanor have staged an intervention for her.

=== Season 3 (2011) ===
No. overall	No. in season	Title	Directed by	Written by	Original release date	US viewers (millions)
25	1	"Game On"	Steve Buscemi	Liz Brixius & Linda Wallem	March 28, 2011	0.611
Jackie vehemently denies being an addict to Kevin and insists that her credit card expenses were for their daughters. The following day, Jackie returns to work, where Eleanor continues to give her the cold shoulder and refuses to reconcile their friendship. To prevent Eleanor from reporting her, Jackie meets with Gloria and plays down her drug addiction, stating that she has been using painkillers strictly for pain. Jackie treats a young man who dies from renal failure after being crushed by a ton of boxes. Animosity is still rife between Sam and Coop, the latter of whom refuses to work with Sam. Zoey publicly announces her fling with Lenny to her co-workers. Kevin meets with an administrator at Grace's school about enrolling Fiona, and insists that he become the primary contact for the girls. The hospital staff discover that Jackie is married when Kevin arrives to confront her, revealing that he will be paying for Fiona's tuition.
26	2	"Enough Rope"	Steve Buscemi	Liz Brixius	April 4, 2011	0.490
Fiona starts at her new school. Gloria happily announces that All Saints is vying for a visit from Michelle Obama and attempts to rally the staff into initiating a campaign against childhood obesity to attract an official visit. Jackie discovers that Eleanor is looking for work at another hospital and tries to dissuade her, telling Eleanor that she will follow her to any hospital just to be near her; the two seemingly reconcile. Coop tries to bury the hatchet with Sam by publicly apologizing in front of the entire staff. Zoey discovers that the maternity ward is taking gloves from the emergency room and, under Gloria's advice, decides to steal them back. Eddie tells Jackie that he wants Kevin to know that he works at All Saints, as he now considers Kevin a real friend. Under Jackie's instructions, Eddie tells Kevin that he has lost his job; Kevin then asks Jackie to refer Eddie for a job at All Saints, which she agrees to.
27	3	"Play Me"	Michael Lehmann	Linda Wallem	April 11, 2011	0.574
Kevin's younger sister Tunie crashes at the Peyton household after breaking up with her pilot boyfriend. Jackie tells Eddie that she thinks Kevin brought Tunie over to monitor her in the wake of his intervention. At the hospital, a Jewish Orthodox husband fights to have his critically injured wife move to Beth Israel for an operation, while two street vendors are brought into the ER after being injured in turf war. Gloria receives a visit from a priest who wants to take back the statues in the hospital chapel. Lenny prepares a romantic lunch for Zoey, only for her to crack her tooth when she bites into a sandwich with his house key hidden inside. Zoey confides about her relationship with Lenny to God, who has set up a makeshift piano bar in the ambulance bay. Jackie has another encounter with Bill, the drug dealer she ripped off; Bill reveals that he is a former drug and alcohol counsellor, and offers to supply Jackie with pills in exchange for cash.
28	4	"Mitten"	Michael Lehmann	Liz Flahive	April 18, 2011	0.595
Kevin invites Eddie to a backyard barbecue at the Peyton household to celebrate his new job. Zoey works her first double shift and becomes addicted to her pedometer, while Gloria initiates her childhood obesity fundraiser. After learning that Gloria wants to name Eleanor as chief of the ER, Coop informs Gloria that he is putting his name in the running; Gloria invites Coop to prove himself worthy, despite having already offered Eleanor the position. Jackie treats a man named Lou, an out-of-work salesman who passed out before a job interview; Jackie discovers that Lou has high blood pressure and gives him a new prescription for meds. At home, Jackie finds an empty dresser and closet and believes that Kevin has left her; Tunie reveals that Kevin is currently attending an AA meeting, and has dropped off old clothes for a clothing drive held at the girls' school. Jackie arrives at the clothing drive to recover a pair of old mittens that have bags of pills stashed inside.
29	5	"Rat Falls"	Tristram Shapeero	Alison McDonald	April 25, 2011	0.650
A rat eats Jackie's secret stash in the hospital basement, and Jackie panics when she realizes that her stash of pills is running low. Jackie confronts Eddie for his recent text exchanges with Tunie, but he maintains that it is completely innocent. Eleanor and Jackie deal with a mother making false claims about her daughter's health in order to stay on public assistance. Lou returns to All Saints, having lost his medical insurance after being laid off; Eleanor gives Lou a bag full of a year's worth of pills, and Jackie schedules him a psych evaluation for his depression. Coop remains determined to battle Eleanor for the ER chief title, but he becomes depressed upon learning that his two mothers are getting a divorce. Gloria asks Jackie and Thor to help move the Virgin Mary statue into the pharmacy backroom, where it will be safe from repossession during the chapel's de-consecration. Jackie meets with Bill and makes her first illicit drug transaction.
30	6	"When the Saints Go"	Tristram Shapeero	Liz Brixius	May 2, 2011	0.531
As her pill supply continues to dwindle, Jackie deceives Kevin into believing she is seeking treatment by searching for information about sobriety resources on the family laptop. At All Saints, Jackie clashes with Kelly Slater, the new temp nurse who bonds with the rest of the hospital staff and recounts his experience treating patients in Haiti. Gloria commiserates as the statues of the saints are finally removed from the chapel. Eleanor bonds with Tottie, a 95-year-old patient experiencing heart palpitations, while a patient consoles Coop, who is depressed about the split of his parents. Zoey treats a patient who expresses interest in asking out Lenny; Zoey gives Lenny the woman's number, but Lenny insists that he wants to remain with Zoey. Eddie considers going out with Tunie, but Jackie pleads with him to not move forward with the date. Depressed, Jackie is unable to walk through her own front door at the end of the day.
31	7	"Orchids and Salami"	Bob Balaban	Ellen Fairey	May 9, 2011	0.467
While dropping the girls off to school, Kevin discovers the dental floss dispenser that contains Jackie’s secret stash of pills underneath the passenger seat. Upon being confronted, Jackie protests that the pills are old, and reassures Kevin by showing him a 30-day sober chip that Bill has given her. At All Saints, a Native American patient momentarily lifts Coop's depression about his parents' divorce, while Zoey connects with Walker, a twelve-year-old boy whose mother was brought in for a drug overdose. Jackie tries to comfort Walker, but he lambasts his mother for being a drug addict. Kelly continues to win over the All Saints crew by inviting all of the hospital staff out for drinks. Eddie asks Kelly to deliver a bag of fentanyl patches for the oncology department. Jackie runs into Kelly and offers to deliver the drugs to oncology herself, but she ends up stealing some of the patches instead.
32	8	"The Astonishing"	Bob Balaban	Rajiv Joseph	May 16, 2011	0.431
Jackie meets with Bill, but he reveals that he is out of pills and suggests that she visit his apartment at the end of the day. Jackie accuses Kelly of impropriety with two drunk high school girls, who have arrived at the ER after one of them faceplants on the sidewalk. Coop is attempting to throw away his childhood toys, which he has collected in his office during his depression. Thor helps Gloria navigate her new cell phone system. While treating a patient high on PCP, Eleanor is attacked while trying to remove the patient's restraints; Eddie offers to give Eleanor painkillers for the pain, but she refuses. Later, Jackie tries to get pills from Eddie, claiming it is for Eleanor, but he remains noncommittal. Jackie arrives at Bill's apartment, but he is accidentally struck and killed by an oncoming truck. Jackie flees the scene and arrives at Grace's school in time to watch her perform in the school pageant.
33	9	"Have You Met Ms. Jones?"	Daisy von Scherler Mayer	Liz Brixius & Wyndham Lewis	May 23, 2011	0.601
Following Bill's death, Jackie has run out of pills and begins to experience withdrawal; she tries to make it through the day by chugging a bottle of cough syrup and acquiring No-doz from Sam. Lenny is admitted into the ER after accidentally sticking himself with an epinephrine pen; Zoey uses Lenny's heart monitor as a lie detector to assess the seriousness of their relationship. Jackie and Eleanor treat a racist and misogynistic patient who has dislocated his shoulder; Jackie punishes the patient by sticking him with Lenny’s epi-pen. Eddie confronts Kelly about the missing fentanyl patches; Kelly meets with HR to resolve the issue, but claims that he does not know who he gave the bag of patches to. Coop decides to start his own family and tracks down an old girlfriend on Facebook. Jackie admits to Eleanor that she has been clean for 37 hours, and laments that she is unsure if she can make another hour.
34	10	"Fuck the Lemurs"	Daisy von Scherler Mayer	Liz Brixius	June 6, 2011	0.556
Jackie and Kevin attend a meeting with Grace and her psychologist, during which Grace reveals that she wants to take medication to treat her anxiety. Upon discovering that HR believes an employee in the ER is abusing narcotics, Gloria puts Jackie on probation and forbids her from administering medication for patients in order to avoid an official investigation. Jackie lambasts Eleanor, believing that she was the one who reported her to HR, but Eleanor insists that she kept quiet about Jackie's pill addiction. Meanwhile, Zoey and Thor spend the day administering flu shots to the hospital staff, while Coop announces that he is getting married and offers to pay Gloria to book the chapel. Gloria accepts Coop's money and tries to offer it as a donation in exchange for the return of the saint statues in the chapel.
35	11	"Batting Practice"	Linda Wallem	Liz Flahive	June 13, 2011	0.582
While practicing at the batting cage, an oddly evasive Kevin admits to Eddie that he has been unable to look at Jackie lately; Eddie informs Jackie that he believes Kevin is aware of their past affair. Coop asks Eddie to be his best man, but Eddie refuses, pointing out that Coop has only known his girlfriend for three weeks. Zoey throws a party for Nurses Appreciation Week that is sparsely attended, while Gloria receives bad news about the hospital's impending visit by the First Lady. Jackie begins abusing Grace's anxiety medication and reluctantly asks Eleanor to refill the prescription. Devastated, Eleanor tells Jackie that she is willing to pay for rehab and help Jackie get clean. Kelly discovers that Jackie is on probation and admits that he went to HR. He invites Jackie to go out for drinks after their shift, during which Jackie admits that she stole some of the fentanyl patches. In response, Kelly also makes a confession: he's never been to Haiti, and he also stole six of the fentanyl patches, causing Jackie to burst out laughing.
36	12	"...Deaf Blind Tumor Pee-Test"	Linda Wallem	Liz Brixius	June 20, 2011	0.832
Gloria informs Jackie that HR has issued mandatory urine tests for nurses in the ER department. Fiona gets in trouble at school for playing with matches; Kevin tries to inform Jackie, but she continues to ignore his calls, trying to avoid an inevitable confrontation. Jackie, Eleanor and Kelly treat a patient with deafblindness who requests that they call his brother; Jackie tries to call the brother, only to discover that he is also admitted at the ER for injuries caused by a boiler explosion. The hospital staff gather for Coop's wedding ceremony in the chapel, but Coop is stood up at the altar. Jackie tries to console Coop by pointing out that he was able to restore the statues in the chapel. Jackie panics when Kevin arrives at All Saints to personally confront her. Suspecting that Kevin is planning to confront her about her relationship with Eddie, Jackie is surprised when Kevin admits that he had a brief affair. Although Kevin is willing to work things out, she instead demands that he move out. Gloria, reluctant to lose an excellent nurse, ultimately throws Jackie's urine sample in the trash, knowing that the results would test positive for banned substances.

=== Season 4 (2012) ===
No. overall	No. in season	Title	Directed by	Written by	Original release date	US viewers (millions)
37	1	"Kettle-Kettle-Black-Black"	Linda Wallem	Liz Brixius	April 8, 2012	0.653
Months after the season three finale, Jackie has broken up with Kevin. Eddie tries to resume his relationship with Jackie, but is hurt to realize that she only slept with him to get drugs. Eddie visits Kevin at his new house and reveals his past affair with Jackie, causing Kevin to beat him. All Saints has been bought out by a corporation called Quantum Bay; Mike Cruz, a physician with Quantum Bay, arrives to address the staff and establish his new role as chief administrator. In addition, Mike demotes Gloria and forces her to work on the floor as a nurse for two years to keep her pension. Jackie invites a druggie into her home to smoke heroin together. When the druggie overdoses and dies, Jackie calls Eleanor and Lenny to dispose of the body. Realizing that she has hit rock bottom, Jackie tearfully admits that she needs to go to rehab. The following day, Eleanor drives Jackie to rehab and reveals that she is pregnant.
38	2	"Disneyland Sucks"	Linda Wallem	Liz Brixius	April 15, 2012	0.579
Jackie begins treatment but is reluctant to open up to the group about the beginning of her addiction; she also struggles to connect with her strict counsellor Laura. At All Saints, Mike wants to make the hospital over into a trauma center with a helipad, while Eleanor finds herself at odds with Mike's administration. Meanwhile, Gloria tries to readjust to being back on the floor as a nurse while the other nurses feel torn about Quantum Bay's corporate swag. Jackie connects with Charlie, a teenage addict attending the same rehab center; Jackie admits to Charlie that her pill addiction began after giving birth to Grace. Jackie breaks down and calls Eleanor to sneak Grace into the rehab center. Jackie, pretending to work as a nurse at the center, briefly reunites with Grace, but she is caught by administration. Laura lambasts Jackie and threatens to kick her out of rehab, but ultimately allows her to stay, sternly reminding Jackie that she has to accept help in order to succeed in her recovery.
39	3	"The Wall"	Seith Mann	Liz Flahive	April 22, 2012	0.531
Jackie rushes to complete her twelve steps and leaves rehab after two weeks despite Laura's objections. Worried about Grace's recent rebellious behavior, Jackie visits Grace at school and unsuccessfully attempts to console her. Jackie returns to work but finds that sobriety has made her soft, breaking down to Eleanor when Coop makes a remark about her hair. Zoey begins to have second thoughts about her relationship with Lenny. Kelly gives Jackie a box of fentanyl patches, after which Jackie reports Kelly to Mike. Jackie then informs Kelly that somebody reported him for stealing drugs, forcing Kelly to flee. Eddie informs Jackie that he has told Kevin about their affair; Jackie calls Kevin, who reveals that he is keeping the girls for an extra night. When Jackie gets home, she finds a list of things Grace wants written on Grace's bedroom wall; Jackie spray paints "NOT GONNA HAPPEN" over the list.
40	4	"Slow Growing Monsters"	Seith Mann	Ellen Fairey	April 29, 2012	0.474
While attending a local carnival, Grace tells Fiona and Zoey that Jackie went to rehab. Realizing that Grace has been aware of her addiction, Jackie rushes to inform Kevin about her stint in rehab before he hears about it from their daughter. Jackie goes to an AA meeting with Charlie, only to find out that he is using again. Charlie reveals that he is staying on his father's boat. Jackie and Eleanor treat Jules, a visibly pregnant woman who was involved in an altercation at a supermarket; Eleanor discovers that Jules is not pregnant but has a rare, terminal desmoid tumor. Jules bonds with Jackie and gives her a bottle of Vicodin; Jackie almost relapses, but ultimately throws the pills in a dumpster. Kevin has Eddie list what Jackie took from the pharmacy before telling Eddie to let Jackie know that she "just lost her kids." Meanwhile, Charlie reunites with his father, who is revealed to be Mike.
41	5	"One-Armed Jacks"	Bob Balaban	Rajiv Joseph	May 6, 2012	0.542
Missing her family and adjusting poorly to single life, Jackie tries to reconcile with Kevin and invites him to meet for lunch, only to be served with divorce papers instead. Mike creates a dress code for the nurses and asks Coop to reveal the new scrubs to the nurses, who react poorly to the announcement. Jackie treats a patient who lost his arm in a botched suicide attempt. After Mike refuses to let her treat a pregnant patient, Eleanor confronts Mike for dismissing her because of her pregnancy; Mike insists that he did so because of his experience in practicing obstetrics. Coop expresses an interest in raising his own family and buys Eleanor a present for her baby boy, which she rejects. Zoey rejects Lenny's offer to move in with him and sets up posters around the hospital looking for a roommate to split a new apartment, which Mike eventually orders her to take down. Zoey gratefully accepts Jackie's invitation to move in with her.
42	6	"No-Kimono-Zone"	Bob Balaban	Liz Brixius	May 13, 2012	0.497
Jackie has a strange dream about relapsing at work. Jackie receives a call from Kevin's divorce lawyer, who reveals that Kevin is suing for custody of the girls. Mike assesses each departments' performance reviews and confronts Jackie, intrigued by her empty professional file. Jackie questions Gloria about her empty file, but receives no response. Jackie and Eleanor treat Lonna, an uninsured trans woman admitted to the ER for abdominal issues caused by estrogen; Gloria refers Lonna to a gender transition clinic that will pay for her medications. Zoey excitedly announces to the staff that she has become engaged to Lenny, but ends up losing her ring during her shift. Coop expresses an interest in becoming a father-figure to Eleanor's baby, but she dismisses him. Jackie receives a second call from Kevin's divorce lawyer and is distraught to discover that Kevin is trying to take her house. Jackie laments to Eleanor that "nothing started going bad" until she became sober.
43	7	"Day of the Iguana"	Miguel Arteta	Wyndham Lewis	May 20, 2012	0.554
Hoping to increase her chances of winning the custody battle, Jackie meets with a divorce lawyer but is reluctant to label Kevin as an unfit father. Gloria reunites with her old mentor, Dick Bobbitt, who has been admitted to the hospital and suffers from dementia. As Dick believes that he is still a practicing nurse, Jackie and Gloria temporarily allow him to help out on the floor until his daughter arrives. Sam, Thor and Coop accidentally drop a patient while transferring him from a gurney; Mike forbids the staff from admitting blame for the incident, but Dick ends up issuing a formal apology to the patient. Zoey begins to reconsider her engagement and decides to break up with Lenny, while Coop earnestly offers to help Eleanor raise her baby. Jackie attends another AA meeting with Charlie, but she dumps him as a confidant after she accidentally takes a sip of his Vicodin-spiked smoothie. When Charlie is arrested, Jackie decides to bail him out and urges him to contact his father. Jackie assists Charlie home and runs into Mike; Jackie is stunned to discover that he is Charlie's father.
44	8	"Chaud & Froid"	Miguel Arteta	Liz Flahive	June 3, 2012	0.627
While Jackie and Mike try to save Charlie from overdosing, Charlie angrily reveals Jackie's affair with Eddie to Mike. Afterwards, Charlie agrees to return to rehab if Mike promises that he will not fire Jackie. Meanwhile, Eddie is deposed by Kevin's divorce lawyer and discloses his affair with Jackie. Afterwards, Eddie decides to help Jackie with her divorce case by revealing that the girls were in the room when Kevin attacked him. Jackie discloses this revelation to her divorce lawyer, after which Kevin angrily confronts Jackie. Eleanor begins to consider accepting Coop's help and invites him to accompany her at her anatomy scan appointment. Lenny tells Zoey that he is moving to Greece to live with his cousins. Now aware of Jackie's stint in rehab, Mike blames Eddie for the narcotics shrinkage and fires him for enabling Jackie's addiction. Mike also reviews the hospital's old security camera footage and discovers proof of Gloria throwing away Jackie's urine sample; Mike confronts Jackie with the security footage and ruthlessly forces her to watch him fire Gloria.
45	9	"Are Those Feathers?"	Randall Einhorn	Liz Brixius & Liz Flahive	June 10, 2012	0.602
Jackie refuses to allow Grace to transfer to public school. At All Saints, Mike lambasts the nurses for raising funds for Gloria and Eddie, while Jackie clashes with Mike over the firing of her colleagues. Eleanor discovers her patient has a subarachnoid hemorrhage and insists on scheduling an operation, but the patient is insistent on picking up her father, who has recently been admitted at Bellevue for a fall. Against Mike's objections, Zoey arrives at Bellevue and helps transfer the father to All Saints on a gurney to reunite with his daughter. Coop learns that Eleanor's sperm donor went to the same childhood camp as him, panicking Eleanor, who does not wish to know the identity of her donor. When an overflow of patients arrive at All Saints after being diverted from another hospital, Mike refuses to hire extra temp nurses and experiences a panic attack. After admitting Mike to pulmonary, Jackie seizes control of the ER to run it her way.
46	10	"Handle Your Scandal"	Randall Einhorn	Liz Brixius	June 17, 2012	0.535
Operations run smoothly at the ER under Jackie's control. Upon waking up in his hospital room, Mike heads back to the ER and lambasts Jackie for overstepping her boundaries. In response, Jackie criticizes Mike's increasingly rigid management style and curses him out; Mike fires her, which riles the hospital staff to protest. While being escorted out by Mike and a security guard, Jackie makes a sarcastic retort about Mike keeping his son's promise. In the wake of her firing, Jackie immediately visits Grace to pull her out of class and allows her to transfer to public school. Meanwhile, Coop discovers the identity of Eleanor's sperm donor, but promises not to tell her. Eleanor goes into labor and tearfully calls Jackie to assist her. Jackie comes back to the hospital to visit Eleanor in maternity but is stopped by Mike; as the two begin to argue, Jackie is shocked to see that Charlie has just been admitted into the ER for a drug overdose. Mike unsuccessfully attempts to resuscitate Charlie, who dies moments after Eleanor has given birth to her baby boy.

=== Season 5 (2013) ===
No. overall	No. in season	Title	Directed by	Written by	Original release date	US viewers (millions)
47	1	"Happy Fucking Birthday"	Randall Einhorn	Clyde Phillips	April 14, 2013	0.770
Four months later, Jackie has returned to work after her union sued All Saints, Gloria has returned to her old job as hospital administrator, and two new doctors have joined the staff: Dr. Carrie Roman, an incompetent first-year resident skating by on looks, and Dr. Ike Prentiss, a former military doctor. Jackie treats a famous NFL player who has swallowed three condoms filled with drugs and blackmails him into buying a new CT machine for the hospital. The hospital staff struggle with the new pill dispenser, leading Eddie to bust the machine open and distribute the pills himself; Gloria is impressed and invites Eddie to return as the hospital pharmacist. Jackie struggles to maintain her sobriety and is upset when Eleanor reveals she is moving to London to prioritize raising her son. The day before her birthday, Jackie asks Kevin to let her have the girls for the celebration; Kevin chooses to keep the girls for the day, reprimanding Jackie to stick to the rules of their visitation agreement. Jackie decides to hide one pill in a small nightstand jewelry box.
48	2	"Luck of the Drawing"	John Cameron Mitchell	Tom Straw	April 21, 2013	0.759
On her birthday, Jackie and Kevin remain at odds over custody of the girls; Kevin insists on primary custody unless Jackie can resolve her long work hours. Coop is thrown off when Gloria announces Prentiss as the new ER chief. Carrie dismisses a returning patient with back pain as a pill addict, but Jackie and Prentiss discover that the patient actually has sepsis incurred from her previous hospital visit. Jackie receives a gift of birthday flowers from her father but refuses to accept them; Jackie later calls Charlie's phone and leaves a voicemail confiding about her day. Gloria begins to experience memory lapses, and Jackie takes advantage of Gloria's memory loss by tricking her into signing off on a shorter work schedule. Still hoping for primary custody, Kevin pushes for psychological testing on the girls. Jackie deters Kevin by asking Fiona to draw a picture of their family, a notable psychological assessment, and pointing out that Fiona has drawn Kevin separately from Jackie and the girls.
49	3	"Smile"	Randall Einhorn	Liz Flahive	April 28, 2013	0.688
Jackie and Kevin finalize their divorce. While leaving the courtroom, Jackie accidentally rear-ends Kevin's car and is knocked unconscious by the airbags. She is admitted as a patient at All Saints, where Kevin berates Jackie and accuses her of being on drugs in front of her colleagues. Frank Verelli, a police officer investigating the accident, takes a liking to Jackie and flirts with her. Carrie treats Jackie and writes her a prescription for Oxycontin, unaware that she is an addict. Meanwhile, Zoey gets an apartment of her own, while Gloria continues to experience memory lapses throughout the day. Coop begins covering for Carrie and taking on a lot more work. Later, Coop confronts Carrie for her unprofessional behavior and involuntarily grabs her breast; in response, she gropes him. Jackie accepts Frank's offer to go out for coffee. The two have a good time, and Frank is accepting when Jackie admits to being a recovering drug addict.
50	4	"Lost Girls"	Romeo Tirone	Michael Davidoff & Bill Rosenthal	May 5, 2013	0.725
Prentiss threatens to report Gloria to the hospital board for her recent memory lapses. When a heavily medicated woman who has been admitted to the ER goes missing, Jackie worries that Gloria has lost the patient. Gloria ultimately reveals that she has been helping the woman hide from her abusive husband, who has been drugging her against her will. Upon discovering Zoey and Thor sneaking the patient out of the hospital, Prentiss kindly reminds Jackie about standard hospital procedures. Coop invites Carrie to dinner, but she cancels their plans last minute to go on a date with the head of cardiology. Coop accuses Carrie of toying with his emotions, but the two end up having sex. Jackie faces conflicts with both of her daughters: Grace has been sneaking around the city with her older boyfriend Danny, and Fiona has been acting out at school. Realizing the extent of their daughters' problems, Jackie and Kevin agree to put up a unified front for the sake of the girls.
51	5	"Good Thing"	Randall Einhorn	Cindy Caponera	May 12, 2013	0.840
Jackie grows nervous as she prepares for her official date with Frank, and she ends up calling Charlie's phone to confide her frustrations. Elsewhere, Carrie and Coop continue their sexual relationship, Zoey helps deliver a baby, and Gloria proves her worth to Prentiss by identifying a spinal fracture in a patient that Prentiss had initially cleared for discharge. Zoey and Thor help Jackie choose an outfit for her date with Frank, which initially goes well until Jackie receives an unexpected call from Charlie's phone; Jackie answers the call and discovers it is Mike, who has followed her inside the restaurant and wishes to meet with her. Jackie leaves her date early and follows Mike to his apartment; she comforts him as he emotionally recounts Charlie's death, and the two end up having sex. While Jackie is away with Mike, Grace sneaks out to meet with Danny at a club but quickly becomes overwhelmed. She leaves the club alone and calls Jackie to pick her up.
52	6	"Walk of Shame"	Seith Mann	Abe Sylvia	May 19, 2013	0.835
Mike unexpectedly arrives at All Saints for his exit interview, stunning the staff. Jackie tells Mike that their sexual encounter was a one-time fling, but Mike tries to insist otherwise. In the chapel, Jackie and Mike have a frank conversation about Charlie, and Jackie reassures that Mike "did his best" in dealing with Charlie's addiction. Meanwhile, Prentiss dismisses a young patient whom he believes is looking to score drugs, but comes to learn that the patient is actually experiencing PTSD from his sister's death. Zoey is admitted as a patient after a showerhead falls on her forehead. Carrie tries to use flashcards to strengthen her skills but continues to manipulate Coop into doing more of her work anyways. After successfully setting a patient's nose back in place by hand, Carrie is motivated into having aggressive sex with Coop, which is accidentally recorded on Coop's voice recorder. After her shift, Jackie and Kevin punish Grace for lying and sneaking out. Jackie visits Mike at his apartment to wish him goodbye, and then heads off to go on a second date with Frank.
53	7	"Teachable Moments"	Jesse Peretz	Daniele Nathanson	May 26, 2013	0.563
While transcribing dictation, Zoey accidentally hears the audio recording of Coop and Carrie having sex and informs Jackie. When Carrie fails to diagnose a patient's appendicitis, Jackie confronts Coop with the recording and instructs him to address Carrie's incompetence; Coop later stands up to Carrie and reprimands her to be a better doctor. Gloria forgets to hire a security escort for Jackie's psych patient, who winds up damaging the pharmacy. After failing to convince Gloria to see a doctor for her memory loss, Jackie and Eddie purposely throw out a few pills, which will require all of the hospital staff to take a mandatory blood test. In an effort to help the reserved Dr. Prentiss bond more with his colleagues, Zoey buys coffee for the entire hospital staff and pretends that it is from Prentiss. Jackie becomes worried when news that a cop has been shot reaches the hospital, and is relieved when she discovers that it is not Frank. Jackie reunites with Frank and reveals her genuine love and concern for him, realizing how important he is to her.
54	8	"Forget It"	Randall Einhorn	Gina Gold & Aurorea Khoo	June 2, 2013	0.784
Jackie invites Frank to her house for dinner, but they are interrupted by Kevin; Jackie angrily lambasts Kevin for showing up unannounced, and Frank decides to leave. The next day, Frank urges Jackie to work out her unresolved issues with Kevin, which pushes Jackie to attend an AA meeting. While treating a patient who is unable to breathe, Carrie learns to trust herself and correctly diagnoses the patient's pneumothorax, impressing Prentiss. Upon reviewing Gloria's blood test, Jackie and Eddie consult with Gloria and deduce that her memory loss is being caused by a new medication that she had been taking for adult onset seizures. Zoey continues to bond with Prentiss by offering to organize his disaster of an office. Jackie discovers that Grace has skipped school and accuses her of sneaking out to meet with Danny, but Grace assures her that they have broken up. At the end of the episode, Jackie visits Kevin at the bar and apologizes for her past behavior, while Grace is revealed to be abusing drugs with Danny.
55	9	"Heart"	Jesse Peretz	Liz Flahive	June 9, 2013	0.821
Jackie and Frank have sex for the first time, and Frank proclaims that he loves her, surprising Jackie. Kevin arrives at All Saints with Grace after discovering a bag of Adderall pills in Grace's backpack; Grace claims that the pills belong to Jackie, forcing both Jackie and Grace to get their blood drawn to prove who is telling the truth. In the process, Grace reveals that she found a pill hidden in Jackie's nightstand jewelry box. Zoey confronts Jackie, concerned that she did not get rid of the pill, but Jackie shuts her down. Meanwhile, Carrie begins shadowing Prentiss in order to further develop her skills; Coop misreads the situation and ultimately decides to break up with her. Gloria reprimands Zoey for taking over Prentiss's administrative duties, and Zoey and Prentiss are later revealed to have begun a sexual relationship. Returning home, Jackie tries to call Frank, but he rebuffs her for being distant. Jackie blames herself for Grace's experimentation with pills and informs Kevin that the girls should live with him for the time being.
56	10	"Soul"	Randall Einhorn	Story by : Abe Sylvia; Teleplay by : Clyde Phillips & Tom Straw	June 16, 2013	0.751
As Jackie prepares to celebrate her one-year anniversary of sobriety, Jackie struggles to rekindle with Frank, who feels he has made an unreciprocated step forward in their relationship. Meanwhile, Thor connects with Wally, a gay 80-year-old patient dying of advanced liver cancer, and tearfully commends Wally for his legacy. Gloria fires Carrie after receiving an overwhelmingly negative performance review by her peers; however, upon consulting with a lawyer, Carrie reveals her sexual relationship with Coop and uses it as leverage to retain her position at All Saints. Zoey discovers that Grace is not attending Jackie's sobriety celebration and decides to pick her up at school; Grace is distraught and has an emotional breakdown about her mother. Frank reunites with Jackie and they reconcile, with Jackie admitting that she loves him. While getting ready for her anniversary party, Jackie nonchalantly takes the pill that she has been hiding in her jewelry box and swallows it. She then attends her anniversary party – which is attended by Kevin, Grace, Fiona, Frank, Eleanor, and the All Saints staff – and announces her one year of sobriety.

=== Season 6 (2014) ===
No. overall	No. in season	Title	Directed by	Written by	Original release date	US viewers (millions)
57	1	"Sink or Swim"	Jesse Peretz	Clyde Phillips	April 13, 2014	0.751
Jackie has relapsed and is back to snorting pills that she is acquiring from an employee at her gym. Meanwhile, Grace is regularly snorting lines of Adderall and her relationship with Jackie remains fraught. The All Saints building momentarily experiences a brownout. Prentiss relieves Carrie from her three-month probation and orders her to shadow Jackie. Carrie tries to initiate another sexual encounter with Coop, but he remains reluctant. At an AA meeting, Jackie gets high and clashes with Antoinette, an outspoken group member. While trying to revive a patient, a distracted Jackie touches the defibrillator and is accidentally shocked; Prentiss blames Carrie and tries to fire her, but Jackie admits that the incident was her fault. Upon learning that the entire hospital staff are aware of their relationship, Prentiss and Zoey consult with Gloria, who purposely decides to ignore their revelation. Jackie has lunch with Antoinette and admits that she relapsed on her one-year anniversary; Antoinette offers to become Jackie's sponsor. Jackie returns to her gym but is disconcerted to learn that her dealer has been caught and fired.
58	2	"Pillgrimage"	Brendan Walsh	Tom Straw	April 20, 2014	0.625
Gloria wins a nice car at a poker game. Prentiss confronts Gloria about All Saints' working conditions, citing the hospital's previous brownout and the broken PA system. Gloria confides in Jackie, who reassures her that she is doing her best with limited resources. Jackie is hesitant when Grace reveals that she wants to go to France for a summer internship. Carrie treats a hit-and-run victim who tries to speak to his wife in Ukrainian; Carrie translates for the man, only to discover that he is confessing to having two secret children. Coop, feeling unfulfilled in his life, decides to become a sperm donor after being contacted by a recruiter on his online dating profile. Jackie uses Carrie's DEA number to forge an Oxycontin prescription under the name Nancy Wood, but learns from the pharmacist that there is a 24-hour waiting period. After briefly trying to flirt with the pharmacist, Jackie calls Antoinette, who deduces that Jackie is using again; Jackie denies relapsing, but confesses that she is reeling from her distant relationship with her daughters. Frank takes Jackie out to a Western-themed dance bar; Jackie sneaks off to the bathroom, where she snorts drugs and has sex with another dealer.
59	3	"Super Greens"	Jesse Peretz & Abe Sylvia	Liz Flahive	April 27, 2014	N/A
Jackie continues to meet with Gabe, the dealer whom she met at the dance bar. Grace is arrested for shoplifting and tells the police that Frank is her father. Kevin and Jackie talk with Grace at the police station, during which Grace reveals that Kevin is engaged to a woman named Mia. Jackie is stunned and confides in Antoinette, who advises her against making impulsive decisions. With the number of bacterial meningitis cases among gay men increasing at the hospital, Zoey and Thor visit a gay bar to hand out vaccinations. Eddie tries to cheer Coop up when he discovers that his sperm count is too low. Carrie treats Pat Kiernan, a local TV personality, who is impressed by Carrie's treatment and wants her to host televised medical segments for the local news; Gloria tentatively gives Carrie her approval, much to the dismay of the hospital staff. Jackie and Zoey treat Lauren, who is experiencing autoimmune issues due to drug interaction effects. Jackie and Zoey trick Lauren's multiple doctors into arriving at All Saints to resolve the matter. Frank returns home and discovers that Jackie has impulsively decided to adopt a dog.
60	4	"Love Jungle"	Adam Arkin	Abe Sylvia	May 4, 2014	0.660
Jackie and Antoinette stalk Mia and discover that she is shopping with Grace, leading Jackie to directly confront the two. Upon learning of the incident, Kevin calls Jackie and decides to cancel their upcoming dinner with Mia. Prentiss treats Morgan, an old childhood friend admitted to the ER for a car accident, and is devastated to discover that Morgan has bone cancer. Frank suggests to Jackie that they move to another house, but she storms off when he confesses that his previous marriage ended because he had an affair, after which his children stopped talking to him. Coop expresses jealousy over Carrie's new TV career. When Coop successfully intubates a baby diagnosed with SRV, Carrie interviews him on-camera to discuss the case for her medical segment. Jackie apologizes to Kevin for confronting Mia but admits that she is worried about Grace; Kevin agrees to overlook the incident. Jackie uncharacteristically hosts a poker game for Gloria, Eddie, Zoey and Thor at her house. When Frank arrives, Jackie reprimands him for not telling her about his previous marital issues. Frank takes the dog out for a walk and is horrified to see Jackie taking several pills through the window.
61	5	"Rag and Bone"	Jesse Peretz	Ellen Fairey	May 11, 2014	N/A
Frank informs Jackie that he caught her secretly taking pills; Jackie admits to having relapsed, but tells him that it was a one-time thing. Naive to what addiction entails, Frank is initially convinced, but becomes suspicious again when Grace states that Jackie is a pathological liar. Frank later discovers a baggie of pills hidden in the back of a television remote and angrily calls Jackie, who ignores him. After five trauma patients are diverted to another hospital for quality reasons, Prentiss tells Zoey that he feels dissatisfied with his current role at All Saints. Jackie tries to hide her stash in a feminine hygiene dispenser at All Saints and is nearly caught by Carrie. After Jackie states that the dispenser is broken, Carrie reports the broken dispenser to Gloria, who asks the hospital's maintenance staff to remove it. Jackie, Coop and an apprehensive Carrie treat Helen, a homeless alcoholic nun. After snorting more drugs with Gabe, Jackie attends her dinner with Kevin and Mia; Frank arrives, intending to confront Jackie with his findings, but decides not to when Mia reveals that she is pregnant. Jackie is visibly distraught and later informs Frank that she wants to move in together.
62	6	"Nancy Wood"	Keith Gordon	Carly Mensch	May 18, 2014	N/A
Jackie tries to pick up her Oxycontin prescription but discovers that there is a hold on Carrie's DEA number. Gloria identifies Nancy Wood as the person who stole Carrie's DEA number, but is unable to find a patient with that name in the hospital's records; Jackie suggests that the information was lost during Gloria's previous memory lapses. Jackie, Carrie and Coop treat a high school athlete who dies of cardiac arrest caused by anabolic steroids. Prentiss informs a stunned Zoey that he has re-enlisted and will be reporting for duty within a couple days. Hoping to win Grace's affection over Mia, Jackie steals Gabe's girlfriend's credit card and uses it to buy two expensive wedding dresses for herself and Grace; Gabe reprimands Jackie, who pays him back with $500 and the remainder of her pills. Frank, having moved in with Jackie, tells Antoinette about his recent findings. Afterwards, Antoinette sternly confronts Jackie for lying about her relapse and recommends that she break up with Frank because he is a pushover. When Antoinette strongly suggests checking Jackie into rehab, Jackie denounces her as her sponsor. At a loft party, Gabe distributes Jackie's pills to a group of teenage girls, including Grace.
63	7	"Rat on a Cheeto"	Jesse Peretz	Heidi Schreck	May 25, 2014	N/A
Jackie meets Grace's friend Mandy, who reveals that Grace is receiving an award at school for her volunteer work. Despite Grace's reluctance, Mandy hides a bag of Oxycontin in a purse underneath Grace's bed. Antoinette tells Jackie that she intends to remain as her sponsor; Jackie reluctantly hands over the rest of her pills. Eddie agrees to acquire Suboxone to help Jackie with her cravings. With Prentiss having left All Saints to report for duty, Gloria names Coop as the new chief of the ER. Carrie comforts Zoey over her break-up with Prentiss, and Zoey has an emotional goodbye with Prentiss over Skype. Jackie attends Grace's awards ceremony with Kevin and Mia, but is stunned when Grace gives a speech detailing her family's struggles with addiction. Returning home, Jackie discovers the bag of Oxycontin in Grace's room; she cries and takes a few of the pills. When Frank arrives, Jackie admits that she took some of the pills and cruelly lambasts him when he tries to call an ambulance. Frank announces that he will be moving out and leaves the house in anger. Moments later, Jackie runs out of the house and desperately asks Frank to help her get clean.
64	8	"The Lady with the Lamp"	Seith Mann	Abe Sylvia	June 1, 2014	N/A
Frank, Eddie and Antoinette help Jackie detox at home. In her detox, Jackie has vivid dreams of treating a young female patient who refuses to open up to her, which is implied to be a representation of Jackie and Grace's distant relationship. Jackie also visualizes herself trying to directly reconcile with Grace, who simply retorts that Jackie should have tried harder. While Jackie is detoxing, Grace and Mandy return to the house to get the purse of drugs. Eddie tells the girls that Jackie and Frank are in Miami and gives Grace the purse without any drugs; Mandy is angered and denounces her friendship with Grace. The following day, Grace visits the hospital and confides in Zoey, revealing that she is being shunned by her friends at school. Zoey encourages Grace to reach out to her mother for support. That night, Grace visits Jackie and breaks down in tears, opening up emotionally to her mother; Jackie is touched and allows Grace to stay at the house overnight. When Frank objects to Grace staying at the house while Jackie is going through withdrawal, Jackie affirms that she is an addict and cannot promise that she won't relapse again.
65	9	"Candyman"	Jesse Peretz	Liz Flahive & Ellen Fairey	June 8, 2014	0.722
Frank warns Jackie of an upcoming DEA investigation at All Saints regarding Carrie's stolen DEA number. Antoinette tries to convince Jackie to attend another AA meeting, but Jackie turns her down. An anemic Helen returns to All Saints for a blood transfusion. Zoey organizes a memorial in the chapel for Naeem, a newsstand operator who worked at All Saints; Coop gathers the mourners into singing The Candyman. Carrie admits her genuine feelings for Coop, and the two have sex on the hospital roof. Eddie and Antoinette bond over dinner. While helping Gloria park her car in a tight spot, Jackie intentionally stages an accident by sticking her foot out so that Gloria will run it over. Afterwards, Jackie claims that she can acquire pain pills through an NA-approved prescription that would be administered by Gloria. Convinced, Gloria gets a prescription for Vicodin from Coop, but states that it is for her own arthritis as a precaution. When the DEA arrives at All Saints for their investigation, Gloria informs Jackie that her mandatory urine test will be delayed until her foot is healed. Frank reconciles with his two young sons and introduces them to an ambivalent Jackie.
66	10	"Sidecars and Spermicide"	Seith Mann	Story by : Carly Mensch; Teleplay by : Carly Mensch & Heidi Schreck	June 15, 2014	0.641
As her drug use intensifies, Jackie tries to avoid Antoinette, who informs Frank that she believes Jackie has relapsed again. Eddie and Antoinette have sex, but he immediately decides to end their fling. Reeling from Eddie's rejection, Antoinette fears that she will relapse in her alcohol addiction and confides in Jackie. Zoey expresses interest in becoming a nurse practitioner and asks Jackie for a letter of recommendation. Carrie forgets about Coop's 40th birthday and asks Thor for help in finding a suitable gift. The DEA continues their investigation into Carrie's stolen DEA number and interrogates each staff member individually. Jackie is cleared of any wrongdoing, but Gloria is questioned about her recent Vicodin prescription. Grace bonds with Frank's eldest son and later calls Zoey for help in acquiring birth control pills. Upon being informed by Zoey, Jackie arrives at the police station and breaks up with Frank, who accuses her of using her children as an excuse to continue her drug use. Jackie meets with Antoinette and manipulates her into falling off the wagon, claiming that they can both enter rehab together. As they both enter the rehab clinic intoxicated, Jackie books Antoinette a room and abandons her there.
67	11	"Sisterhood"	Brendan Walsh	Liz Flahive	June 22, 2014	N/A
After being interrogated by the DEA, Gloria confronts Jackie, believing that she is responsible for the stolen DEA number. Meanwhile, Zoey is disconcerted when Jackie nearly kills another patient after administering the wrong dose of insulin. Helen returns to All Saints after a suicide attempt and thanks Jackie for her assistance, offering to recompense her in any way she can. Later, Gloria and Carrie are stunned when Helen reveals that her legal name is Nancy Wood, prompting Gloria to apologize to Jackie. At Jackie's request, Zoey sends her a picture of Helen from her last hospital visit. After her shift, Jackie attends Kevin and Mia's wedding and invites Gabe as her plus-one; Grace recognizes Gabe from the loft party and calls Zoey. Grace then confronts Jackie, revealing that she knows Gabe is a drug dealer; Jackie shoves Gabe into a table for selling drugs to children, causing Kevin to ask both Gabe and Jackie to leave. Following Helen's death, Carrie asks Zoey for Helen's personal ID, intending to give it to the DEA; Zoey realizes that the photograph on the ID card matches the picture she had previously sent to Jackie. Suspicious, Zoey visits Gloria to inquire about Jackie.
68	12	"Flight"	Jesse Peretz	Story by : Abe Sylvia; Teleplay by : Clyde Phillips & Tom Straw	June 29, 2014	0.674
After getting kicked out of Kevin's wedding, Jackie visits Eddie and initiates a sexual encounter with him. Zoey informs Gloria that she believes Jackie is using again, recounting the insulin incident, but chooses not to disclose her findings regarding Helen's fake ID. The following day, Gloria prohibits Jackie from treating patients and offers her an ultimatum: comply with a urine test or enter a hospital diversion program, which will include the temporary suspension of her nursing license. Jackie does not make an immediate decision and instead asks Eddie for help. Meanwhile, Carrie reveals to Coop that she is pregnant. Zoey privately confronts Jackie, revealing that she knows Jackie made a fake ID and convinced Helen to present herself as Nancy Wood, and threatens to report her unless she agrees to attend rehab. Jackie leaves the hospital and tries to visit Grace and Fiona; Grace insists that Jackie seek help, while Mia lambasts Jackie for ruining her wedding. With Eddie's assistance, Jackie attempts to flee New York with a car full of meds to help hurricane relief victims in Miami. On the way to the airport, Jackie inadvertently crashes her car into an ambulance and is arrested for drug trafficking.

=== Season 7 (2015) ===
No. overall	No. in season	Title	Directed by	Written by	Original release date	US viewers (millions)
69	1	"Clean"	Brendan Walsh	Story by : Clyde Phillips & Tony Saltzman; Teleplay by : Clyde Phillips	April 12, 2015	0.532
Jackie suffers through detox in jail and is rushed to Bellevue after fainting. After being released, Jackie visits All Saints and tells Zoey that she went through detox at an outpatient rehab facility. Relieved, Zoey deletes the picture of Helen from her phone, and is reluctant to accept Gloria's offer to become head nurse of the ER. Coop and Carrie try to keep her pregnancy a secret from the hospital staff. Jackie visits Kevin and asks to meet with Grace and Fiona, but he refuses, stating that it is dangerous for their daughters to be around her. When Jackie claims that she went through a detox program, Kevin reveals that the police notified him about her recent arrest. After learning from Grace that Jackie was actually arrested, Zoey tells Gloria that she has decided to accept the head nurse position. Jackie attempts to hire cutthroat attorney Barry Wolfe, but he refuses, believing that Jackie will be unable to get her nursing license back. Unwilling to accept losing her job, Jackie returns to All Saints, where she is publicly lambasted and fired by Gloria. Jackie then visits Barry, claiming that she was wrongfully terminated; he decides to accept her case.
70	2	"Deal"	Julie Anne Robinson	Tom Straw	April 19, 2015	0.810
Zoey admits to Gloria that she is conflicted over Jackie's firing. Unable to pay Barry's $10K retainer, Jackie tries to get a second mortgage on her house, but learns that the joint account she shares with Kevin is empty. Upon being confronted, Kevin admits that he forged Jackie's signature to pay for his wedding and bar renovation. Jackie blackmails Kevin into letting her visit Grace and Fiona again, and forces him to sell his Jeep and Rolex so that she can collect the money. Jackie takes up a new job as a home health care nurse for an elderly woman named Vivian and steals her pills, selling them to Gabe to pay the remainder of Barry's retainer. Meanwhile, Gloria asks Eddie to write a complete accounting inventory of the pharmacy, suspecting that he was involved in supplying Jackie with the drugs that resulted in her arrest. Jackie and Barry return to All Saints, where Barry successfully vouches to HR that Jackie was wrongfully dismissed and defamed by Gloria. Jackie is allowed to enter a hospital diversion program; Gloria sternly reminds Jackie that she will not be allowed to treat patients, as her nursing license is suspended for three months.
71	3	"Godfathering"	Brendan Walsh	Liz Flahive	April 26, 2015	0.651
Jackie returns to work at All Saints and is immediately reprimanded by Gloria for tending to a patient. Intending to make Jackie's job so miserable that she will quit, Gloria instructs Jackie to clean rooms and mop floors, and tasks a reluctant Zoey with supervising Jackie throughout the day, including during her urine tests. Zoey is upset at having to supervise her former mentor, and Thor asks Eddie to give Zoey a Xanax to calm her down; Gloria fires Eddie for dispensing medication without a proper prescription. Eddie informs Jackie of his firing and kisses her in front of the stunned hospital staff. Meanwhile, Carrie tells Jackie that she had a miscarriage, but struggles with how to inform Coop, who is planning to surprise Carrie with a new house. Jackie ultimately helps Carrie disclose her miscarriage to Coop, who is devastated by the news. Zoey learns that she has been accepted into her master's program. While transferring a patient's body to the hospital basement, Jackie speaks with another nursing assistant, who reveals that he overheard from HR that All Saints will be sold to a Norwegian development company to be repurposed as luxury condos.
72	4	"Nice Ladies"	Keith Gordon	Abe Sylvia	May 3, 2015	0.742
Jackie's criminal case is dismissed after Barry convinces the judge that Jackie was only intending to help hurricane victims. Jackie tries to warn Gloria about the hospital's sale to real estate developers, but Gloria does not believe her. Jackie then writes a message on the hospital's public monitor informing the staff about the upcoming development. Coop proposes to Carrie; she refuses, but shows that she still cares for him by pulling strings at Mass General to offer Coop a position as chief internist. After a heart-to-heart conversation with Jackie, Coop accepts the job offer and gives his two weeks notice. Zoey is upset after being forced to refuse Grace's offer to take Jackie out for lunch, and she informs Gloria that she will no longer continue to supervise Jackie. Eddie gets a new job as a pharmaceutical rep and offers to help Jackie with her drug dealing in order to pay Barry. Jackie also convinces Vivian to move to an assisted living facility, intending to steal expired medication from the other patients at the facility. Jackie and Eddie meet with Gabe; Eddie is enraged to discover Jackie and Gabe's previous relationship and fights with him, causing Gabe to drive off.
73	5	"Coop Out"	Brendan Walsh	Ellen Fairey	May 10, 2015	0.743
Jackie organizes meetings with the ER staff to protest the impending hospital sale, and she sneaks into a meeting with the Norwegian executives to gain inside information. Johanes Karlsen, one of the executives, tells Jackie that he will help get her nursing license back if she keeps quiet about the sale. At the next meeting with the ER staff, Jackie concedes that the sale is developing too rapidly and suggests that they stop protesting, upsetting her colleagues. Jackie later steals a USB drive from the Norwegian executives, which contains concrete information about the impending sale. Meanwhile, Zoey manages leading the new nurses, while Coop attends his exit interview as he prepares to leave for Boston. Gloria introduces the staff to Coop's replacement, Dr. Bernard Prince, who is transferring from the ICU. Bernard bonds with Jackie and allows her to briefly assist a patient, leading Gloria to reprimand the two. Bernard also organizes a goodbye party for Coop at a Romanian restaurant; Coop gives a speech acknowledging each of his co-workers, including Carrie, whom he thanks for changing his life. Jackie anonymously mails the USB drive to The New York Times.
74	6	"High Noon"	Adam Bernstein	Carly Mensch	May 17, 2015	0.783
Jackie experiences craving dreams and confides in Bernard about her past. After news of the condos being built is reported by The New York Times, Johanes informs Jackie that the leak has actually accelerated the impending sale. Thor, who has taken the role of union representative, confronts Jackie after catching her consulting with Johanes; Jackie privately admits that Johanes is helping her reinstate her nursing license. Zoey leads the nurses into a walkout to protest the selling of the hospital, leaving only Jackie and the doctors to run the E.R. Without any nurses, Bernard asks Jackie to assist in reviving Vinny, a heroin addict who has overdosed. Forced to work overtime, Jackie calls Grace to cancel their evening plans; Jackie is devastated to overhear Grace consoling Fiona, softly telling her that Jackie can be unreliable. Jackie helps Zoey bring more attention to the walkout by calling the police. Zoey publicly defies the officers' orders to peacefully disperse, which culminates in her, Thor, Gloria, and the other nurses getting arrested. When Vinny leaves the hospital, Jackie follows him and is offered a bump of cocaine; Jackie hesitates, but ultimately declines the offer, instead deciding to call Grace to apologize.
75	7	"Are You with Me, Doctor Wu?"	Brendan Walsh	Tom Straw	May 24, 2015	0.697
After Gloria chastises Jackie for treating Vinny during the nurses' protest, Bernard organizes a counselling meeting with Jackie and Gloria to settle their differences, although his efforts remain futile. Bernard convinces Gloria to go out for lunch, and the two bond; Gloria reveals that she has no compassion towards Jackie because of her past experiences with her own son, who was also a drug addict. Meanwhile, Zoey and Carrie bond after the death of a patient, and the two consume shrooms in Central Park. Wanting to focus on getting her life back and reconciling with her kids, Jackie convinces Eddie to sell all of their drugs at a "pill mill" so that drugs will remain completely out of her life. At the pill mill, Eddie sells his drugs to Dr. Wu, but when a young woman has an overdose in the lobby, Jackie refuses to go through with the deal until Dr. Wu calls a private ambulance to tend to the woman. After leaving the pill mill, Eddie reveals that they made $22,000 and mentions that Dr. Wu assumed that Jackie was his wife. After reminiscing, Jackie and Eddie agree that they should get married.
76	8	"Managed Care"	Jesse Peretz	Abe Sylvia	May 31, 2015	0.593
Grace is ambivalent about Jackie's engagement with Eddie, believing their relationship to be unhealthy. All Saints enters escrow with the Norwegian developers, with all of the hospital's non-essential departments shutting down. Gloria announces that the ER is still considered essential, but advises the staff to start looking for new jobs. Jackie learns that Johanes will not look into getting her medical license reinstated until escrow closes on the sale. Bernard learns that Joe, a long-term ICU patient with an advanced brain tumor, is being transferred to Minnesota as a result of the escrow shutdown. Worried that Joe will die during his move to Minnesota, Jackie helps Bernard sneak around the hospital to steal meds for Joe. Upon discovering that Thor has married his boyfriend Reuben, Zoey and Carrie organize a proper wedding ceremony for the couple in the hospital chapel, which will be converted into Johanes's office. During the wedding ceremony, Jackie catches Bernard viewing a CT scan in his office. Initially believing that the scan is of Joe's tumor, Jackie learns that it actually belongs to Bernard, who has stage four glioblastoma. Elsewhere, Grace is seen boarding a Greyhound bus to an unknown destination alone.
77	9	"Serviam in Caritate"	Brendan Walsh	Heidi Schreck	June 7, 2015	0.723
Zoey receives a call from Grace, who is stranded at a truck stop in Pennsylvania after her bus accidentally departed without her; Jackie and Zoey immediately leave to pick up Grace. Meanwhile, All Saints becomes flooded with locals after Bernard gives an impoverished patient a year's worth supply of heart medication. Gloria directs the overflow of patients to wait in Johanes's office, leading to a physical altercation. Eddie comes to Gloria's defense and punches Johanes, who angrily declares that his deal with Jackie is off, making Gloria suspicious. While being treated for his bruised nose, Johanes asks Carrie out on a date. At the truck stop, Jackie and Zoey locate Grace, who was planning to attend a prospective student weekend at UPenn; Zoey angrily lambasts Grace. After deciding to drop off Grace at UPenn, Jackie confronts Zoey for her reaction, deducing that Zoey's anger for her was misdirected at Grace. Zoey tearfully reveals that she considered Jackie her idol, and is struggling to reconcile with Jackie's wrongdoings. Zoey also states that she is dropping out of grad school, having lost her passion for nursing. Jackie gives Zoey a motivational speech commending her work as a nurse, and the two reconcile.
78	10	"Jackie and the Wolf"	Jesse Peretz	Ellen Fairey & Carly Mensch	June 14, 2015	0.728
Eddie receives a visit from an investigator at his pharmaceutical company, who points out multiple discrepancies in Eddie's paperwork. When the investigator strolls the apartment with a drug-sniffing dog, Jackie finds a stray pill on the floor and swallows it, although she immediately spits it out after the investigator leaves. Upon learning that Barry has moved up her nursing license reinstatement hearing to that day, Jackie tries to avoid taking a urine test, believing that the results may come back positive. Jackie explains her situation to Zoey, who tentatively agrees to give Jackie her own urine sample so that the test will come back negative. Meanwhile, Bernard begins to show adverse symptoms of his brain tumor. At Jackie's hearing, Bernard advocates for Jackie, but inadvertently admits that she had treated patients against diversion protocol. Gloria publicly argues against the reinstatement of Jackie's license, stating that Jackie is a pathological liar who has damaged her career and relationships with her family. In response, Barry and Jackie tell the board about Gloria's addict son and suggest that Gloria has a "misplaced vendetta" against Jackie. Despite the tumultuous hearing, the board ultimately decides to reinstate Jackie's license.
79	11	"Vigilante Jones"	Brendan Walsh	Liz Flahive	June 21, 2015	0.612
Jackie returns to All Saints as an official nurse and immediately reverts back to drug use, while Gloria decides to stay home for the week. Bernard experiences vision issues while treating a patient, and becomes belligerent when Jackie suggests that he remove himself from the floor. Jackie visits Gloria at her apartment to seek help with removing Bernard, and apologizes for bringing up Gloria's personal issues at her hearing. Although still angry, Gloria thanks Jackie, as the hearing ultimately encouraged her to reconnect with her son. Zoey reprimands Carrie for having sex with Johanes, who has bragged about their fling to the hospital staff; Carrie gets revenge on Johanes by calling his wife to inform her about the affair. At All Saints, Jackie finds Eddie trying to convince a visibly disoriented Bernard to authorize meds. Jackie forces Eddie to leave and lambasts him for trying to take advantage of Bernard; Eddie reveals he is getting deposed, and points out Jackie's hypocrisy, asserting that she is willing to damage her own personal relationships to get what she wants. Before leaving the hospital, Eddie warns Jackie that it is not going to end well for the both of them.
80	12	"I Say a Little Prayer"	Abe Sylvia	Story by : Liz Flahive; Teleplay by : Clyde Phillips & Tom Straw	June 28, 2015	0.835
Eleanor returns to New York and reunites with Jackie to attend Fiona's confirmation. As the hospital prepares to shut down, Jackie receives a job offer from Bellevue and wants Zoey to come with her. Zoey is hesitant, and later confides in Eleanor about Jackie's recent relapse and arrest. Eleanor sternly confronts Jackie, suspecting that she is using again. At his deposition, Eddie discovers that he has been caught on tape drug dealing from Dr. Wu's pill mill. To avoid implicating Jackie, Eddie makes a full confession and prepares for a one-year prison sentence. Bernard's health continues to deteriorate, and he mistakes Jackie for his ex-wife. Jackie treats Vinny, the hospital's final patient, who refuses to take back the bag with his belongings. Zoey ultimately declines Jackie's offer, deciding that she needs to move on individually without worrying about Jackie. For its final night, the All Saints staff throw a goodbye party; Jackie goes to the bathroom and snorts three lines of street-grade heroin that she found in Vinny's bag. Jackie then returns to the party and overdoses on the hospital floor. The series concludes with the ER staff trying to revive Jackie, whose fate is left ambiguous.
