= The Other Steve and Edie =

American cabaret act

The Other Steve and Edie is a cabaret act conceived by Stephen Wallem and Edie Falco, with musical direction by three-time After Dark Award winner, Beckie Menzie and direction by Tony Humrichouser. Throughout the show, the duo performed songs ranging from contemporary pop and jazz standards to show tunes and original material. It ran for a limited, sold-out engagement from February 4 through 6th, 2011 at the Laurie Beechman Theatre in the heart of New York city's theater district.

Both Wallem and Falco currently star in Showtime's Nurse Jackie. Wallem is a veteran of the theatre, (having performed with Patti Lupone, Audra McDonald, Michael Cerveris and George Hearn as well as a one-man cabaret act titled "Off the Wallem").

The show received positive reviews, with one critic saying, "Yes, Edie can sing and this show revealed another side of this multi-talented performer. Falco did everything right, beginning with selecting Wallem as her partner" and "Good actors know how to connect with an audience during a performance and this Steve and Edie certainly did that… This cabaret act was refreshing, bringing two new talents (to cabaret, at least) into the fold".
