= Ruby Jerins =

American actress

- Occupation: Actress
- Years active: 2001–present
- Relatives: Sterling Jerins (sister)

Ruby Jerins is an American actress who played Grace Peyton for seven seasons in the comedy-drama series Nurse Jackie. She started out playing guest star parts on NBC’s Law & Order: SVU and Kidnapped, and then was a recurring character in the ABC series Six Degrees. She played the daughter of Kevin Bacon in the HBO film Taking Chance, and when she was 8, Martin Scorsese cast her opposite Leonardo DiCaprio and Michelle Williams in Shutter Island. She then played Caroline Hawkins in the 2010 film Remember Me opposite Robert Pattinson, Emilie de Ravin, and Pierce Brosnan. After that she booked the role of Melanie in Louder Than Bombs, a film by Joachim Trier that was in the main competition at Cannes in 2015. She can be seen in "BLKBX", a music video filmed in several parts featuring Grace Gaustad that promotes self empowerment and healing above bullying for young women. Jerins studied acting at LaGuardia High School of the Arts in New York City, and went to college at Tulane University.

== Life and career ==
Jerins is the daughter of the artist Edgar Jerins and actress Alana Jerins, and the older sister of Sterling Jerins, an actress who appeared in The Conjuring. Jerins made her acting debut in the film The Wedding in 2001, alongside Jaid Barrymore and Stephen C. Bradbury, playing the flower girl. Jerins has also guest starred in television series such as Kidnapped, Law & Order, Guiding Light, As the World Turns, Six Degrees, and Saturday Night Live. She also had a main role in Nurse Jackie.

In 2010, Jerins played one of the main characters in the film Remember Me, alongside Robert Pattinson and Emilie De Ravin.

== Filmography ==
Year	Film	Role	Notes
2001	The Wedding	The Flower Girl	
2004	Water	Mary	
2006	Guiding Light	Katie	Episode: "#1.14850"
2006	Saturday Night Live	Princess Amendola	Episode: "Natalie Portman/Fall Out Boy"
2006–07	As the World Turns	Jill Marks	5 episodes
2006–07	Six Degrees	Eliza Morgan	11 episodes
2007	Zoe's Day	Zoe	Short film
2007	Kidnapped	Annabelle Kellogg	Episode: "Do Unto Others"
2008	Law & Order	Lacy Talbot	Episode: "Falling"
2009	Taking Chance	Olivia Strobl	Television film
2009–15	Nurse Jackie	Grace Peyton	Main role; 70 episodes
2010	Shutter Island	Rachel Laeddis	
2010	Remember Me	Caroline Hawkins	
2010	Law & Order: Special Victims Unit	Rose Samonsky	Episode: "Bullseye"
2015	Louder Than Bombs	Melanie	

== Awards ==
- Recanati-Kaplan Excellence in the Arts Scholarship, June 2007.
