= Stephen Wallem =

American stage and television actor (born 1968)

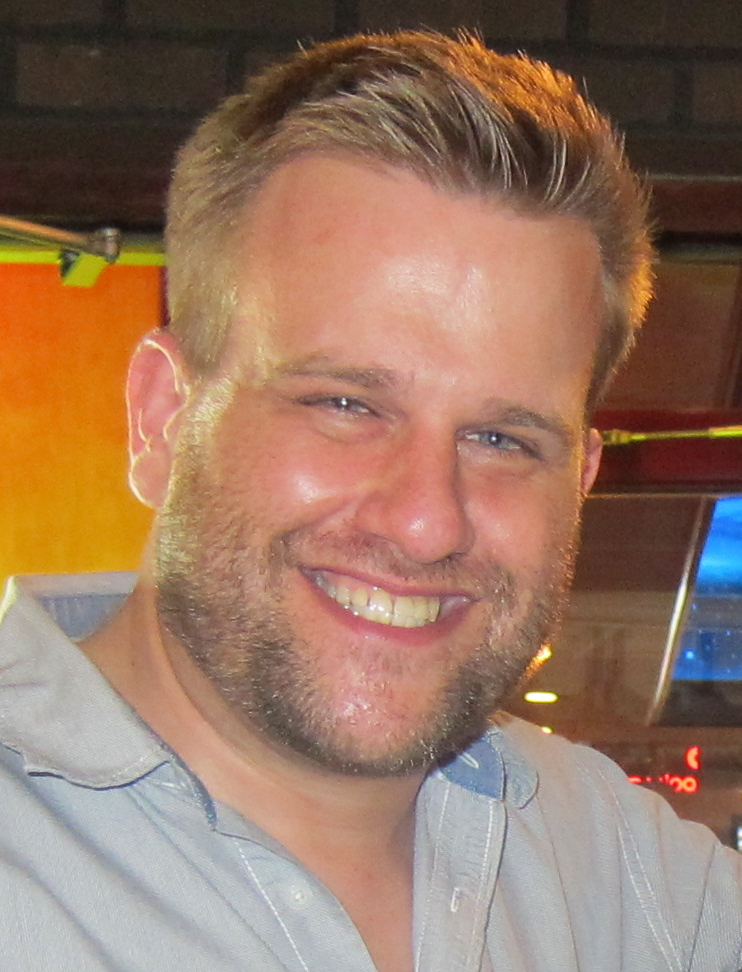
- Wallem in 2011
- Born: June 14, 1968 (age 58); Rockford, Illinois, U.S.
- Occupation: Actor
- Relatives: Linda Wallem (older sister)

Stephen Wallem (born June 14, 1968) is an American stage and television actor. He is best known for his one-man musical revue, "Off the Wallem", as well as numerous theater productions. Wallem is also a playwright, composer, and director. From 2009 to 2015, he portrayed Thor Lundgren in the Showtime series Nurse Jackie. He is the younger brother of Linda Wallem, who is an actress, a writer, and a producer.

== Life and career ==
Wallem was born and raised in Rockford, Illinois, and worked as a stage actor and After Dark Award-winning cabaret singer in Chicago before moving to New York to make his television debut on Nurse Jackie. Wallem was influenced by his uncle James Robert Smith to start acting. National tours include Forever Plaid, Into the Woods and Scrooge with Richard Chamberlain. He accrued nearly 2,500 performances as both 'Jinx' and 'Sparky' in various companies of Forever Plaid, including Chicago, Las Vegas, Denver and the first national tour. Wallem portrayed 'Judas'/'Padre' in the Court Theatre's acclaimed production of Man of La Mancha (After Dark Award for 'Outstanding Performance', Joseph Jefferson Award for 'Best Ensemble') and reprised his performance at the Long Wharf Theatre in New Haven. For the Ravinia Festival, he appeared with Tony-winners Patti LuPone, Audra McDonald, Michael Cerveris and George Hearn in A Little Night Music, Passion, Sunday in the Park with George and Doll with David Hyde Pierce (all directed by Lonny Price). Wallem also originated the role of 'Arvid' in the Broadway workshop of Kristina från Duvemåla, written by Benny Andersson and Björn Ulvaeus of ABBA.

After wrapping up season 3 of Nurse Jackie, Wallem teamed up with costar Edie Falco for a cabaret show entitled The Other Steve and Edie. The production, conceived by Wallem and Falco with musical direction by three-time After Dark Award winner Beckie Menzie and direction by Tony Humrichouser, ran for a 3-night limited engagement at The Laurie Beechman Theatre. The show received numerous critical accolades, with one reviewer stating There was a well thought out balance between serious ballads and more humorous pieces, the obvious forte of Wallem, who delighted the crowd with two parodies, one a spoof of "wordy lyrics," another a takeoff on Wicked's "Defying Gravity," changed to "Defying Parody".

In 2013, Wallem had a show called Schwartz and All at the Birdland, singing songs by Stephen Schwartz, again with Beckie Menzie.

In 2017, Wallem was cast in "I Hate Musicals: The Musical" which played at the Ivoryton Playhouse.

Wallem had a supporting role as Mr. Pitts in the 2022 Jennifer Lopez romcom Marry Me, and a supporting role in seasons 5 and 6 of The Resident as Winston, an amazing and blind yet very resourceful social worker.

== Personal life ==
Wallem is openly gay. In 2019, he got engaged to Tony Humrichouser. He also has Type 1 diabetes, which was incorporated into his role in Nurse Jackie.
