= Louder Than Bombs (film) =

- Film poster
- Directed by: Joachim Trier
- Written by: Eskil Vogt; Joachim Trier
- Produced by: Thomas Robsahm; Joshua Astrachan; Marc Turtletaub; Albert Berger; Ron Yerxa; Alexandre Mallet-Guy
- Starring: Gabriel Byrne; Jesse Eisenberg; Isabelle Huppert; Devin Druid; Rachel Brosnahan; Ruby Jerins; Megan Ketch; David Strathairn; Amy Ryan
- Cinematography: Jakob Ihre
- Edited by: Olivier Bugge Coutté
- Music by: Ola Fløttum
- Production companies: Animal Kingdom; Arte France Cinéma; Beachside; Bona Fide Productions; Memento Films Production; Motlys; Nimbus Film
- Distributed by: SF Norge A/S (Norway); Memento Films Production (France)
- Release dates: 18 May 2015 (Cannes); 15 September 2015 (TIFF); 2 October 2015 (Norway); 3 December 2015 (Denmark); 9 December 2015 (France)
- Running time: 109 minutes
- Countries: Norway; France; Denmark
- Language: English
- Budget: US$11 million
- Box office: US$1,157,616

Louder Than Bombs is a 2015 drama film directed by Joachim Trier and starring Jesse Eisenberg, Devin Druid, Gabriel Byrne, Isabelle Huppert, David Strathairn, and Amy Ryan. The film was internationally co-produced and was co-written by Trier and Eskil Vogt.

Louder Than Bombs was Trier's first English-language film. It was selected to compete for the Palme d'Or at the 2015 Cannes Film Festival, and was shown in the Special Presentations section of the 2015 Toronto International Film Festival. It won the Nordic Council Film Prize.

== Plot ==
Famed war photographer Isabelle Reed dies in a car crash. Three years later, a retrospective exhibition celebrating her work, as well as an article about her life and death, is slated for release. This puts her widower, Gene, in a crisis, as their younger son, Conrad, has no idea that she died by suicide.

Conrad, meanwhile, is angry, aggressive, and seemingly suicidal himself. He frequently fantasizes about his mother and her death and obsesses over one of his female classmates. Jonah, Isabelle and Gene's oldest child, comes down to visit his father and Conrad. He goes over his mother's work before it is donated to the museum. Though Jonah appears to Gene to be stable, he refuses to believe that Isabelle died by suicide and censors her work, deleting some of her photographs which appear to show her having an affair.

Later, at the hospital, when his child is being born, Jonah runs into Erin, an old girlfriend whose mother is dying of cancer. He allows her to believe that his wife also has cancer. Wanting to return home after visiting his father and brother, Jonah stops by Erin's house and the two have sex. Jonah says that he has never told his wife about Isabelle or the way that she died. After the encounter, rather than return home, he goes back to Gene's house and lies to his wife, saying that the family needs him more than he expected.

Jonah and Conrad bond. Conrad allows Jonah to read portions of his diary, which explains his seemingly odd and random behaviour. Conrad wants to give the diary to Melanie, the girl he has a crush on, but Jonah dissuades him from doing so, saying that he will be humiliated. Conrad ignores the advice and prints out his diary, leaving it on Melanie's doorstep.

Gene gives Isabelle's work to an old friend of hers, Richard, who is authoring the article about her. He is given permission to curate her work to see what is personal and what is not. Richard reveals that he and Isabelle had an ongoing affair overseas but that she was never interested in continuing it at home.

Richard's article comes out earlier than expected and Jonah takes the news poorly. As Gene has not had the chance to tell Conrad yet, he repeatedly tries to contact him, but Conrad ignores him and goes to a party. There, he is able to spend time with Melanie, who is drunk, so he walks her home. After returning to his own home, Conrad asks his father if what the article said about Isabelle is true. He accepts the news graciously, but tells his father that Jonah is handling the situation badly.

Jonah is unable to return home, having avoided his wife and child for a while now, but Gene offers to drive him there. As Gene, Conrad, and Jonah drive towards Jonah's home, Conrad recounts a dream he had in which his mother brought home a baby from overseas, who was an old man, who was actually Jonah's baby.

== Cast ==
- Gabriel Byrne as Gene Reed
- Isabelle Huppert as Isabelle Reed
- Jesse Eisenberg as Jonah Reed
- Devin Druid as Conrad Reed
- David Strathairn as Richard
- Amy Ryan as Hannah
- Rachel Brosnahan as Erin
- Leslie Lyles as The Principal
- Ruby Jerins as Melanie
- Megan Ketch as Amy Reed
- Charlie Rose as himself

== Production ==
On 9 May 2013, Eisenberg, Byrne, and Huppert joined the film, which Trier was set to direct as his English-language debut. On 29 August, the film was postponed indefinitely due to financial problems. On 5 February 2014, Arte France Cinéma was on board to finance the film. On 4 September, Strathairn and Ryan joined the cast of the film. On 9 September, Brosnahan joined the film to play Eisenberg's character's ex-girlfriend.

=== Filming ===
On 21 August 2014, it was reported that the crews started the preparations for the shooting of the film on Northern Boulevard in Bayside, New York. The eight-week of filming began on 4 September 2014, in New York City.

== Reception ==
Louder Than Bombs received generally positive reviews from critics. On review aggregator Rotten Tomatoes, the film holds a 72% approval rating based on 130 reviews, with an average rating of 6.8/10. The site's consensus says that the film "finds director Joachim Trier using a capable cast in pursuit of some lofty dramatic goals, even if his ambitions occasionally evade his grasp." Metacritic, which assigns a weighted average score out of 100 to reviews from mainstream critics, reports the film has a score of 70 based on 32 reviews.

Ignatiy Vishnevetsky of The A.V. Club described the film as "the kind of multi-faceted, ambitious, incompletely resolved American drama that American filmmakers never seem to get around to making: novelistic in subject and structure, but completely cinematic in the way it expresses itself, even if Trier’s camera style never rises to the sophistication of his influences."
