= Liz Brixius =

American television writer and producer

- Born: Excelsior, Minnesota, U.S.
- Occupations: Television writer, producer
- Partner: Ali Adler (2013–2017)

Liz Brixius is an American television writer and producer.

In 2008 Brixius, Linda Wallem, and Evan Dunsky, created the series Nurse Jackie, a half-hour drama about a "flawed" emergency room nurse in a New York City hospital. Starring Edie Falco of The Sopranos, the series premiered on Showtime in June 2009, with Wallem and Brixius serving as showrunners for the series and sharing executive producer duties with Caryn Mandabach.

Brixius left Nurse Jackie in the spring of 2012 after signing a two-year development deal with Universal TV.

Brixius was engaged to producer Ali Adler. They broke up in May 2017.
