= Linda Wallem =

American actress, writer, and producer (born 1961)

- Born: May 29, 1961 (age 65); Madison, Wisconsin, U.S.
- Occupations: Actress, writer, producer
- Years active: 1988–present
- Known for: Nurse Jackie; Rocko's Modern Life and Rocko's Modern Life: Static Cling
- Spouse: Melissa Etheridge (m. 2014)

Linda Wallem (born May 29, 1961) is an American actress, writer, and producer, best known for creating the Showtime medical comedy-drama Nurse Jackie, and for her roles as Doctor Paula Hutchison, Virginia Wolfe, and numerous other female characters on Rocko's Modern Life and Rocko's Modern Life: Static Cling.

== Early life ==
Wallem was born in Madison, Wisconsin, and raised in Rockford, Illinois. She is the older sister of actor Stephen Wallem, who co-stars on her show Nurse Jackie as a nurse named Thor Lundgren.

== Career ==
=== Early career ===
Wallem began her career at Dudley Riggs' Brave New Workshop in Minneapolis. She and fellow writer-performer Peter Tolan formed a double act called Wallem & Tolan and began performing on the cabaret circuit in Boston and New York City. Broadway writer and director Martin Charnin worked with the duo to present it as an off-Broadway show called Laughing Matters in 1989.

=== Acting ===
Wallem appeared in the 1993 film Sleepless in Seattle waitress Loretta. Wallem also played a waitress in the 1994 Seinfeld episode "The Soup." She then voiced Doctor Paula Hutchison, Virginia Wolfe, and numerous other female characters on the Nickelodeon animated series Rocko's Modern Life (1993–1996). She returned to voice Hutchison and other characters in the 2019 Netflix special Rocko's Modern Life: Static Cling.

=== Writing and producing ===
Wallem wrote for Cybill Shepherd's sitcom Cybill from 1995 to 1998, also occasionally acting on the series. She then wrote for the sitcom That '70s Show from 1998 to 2000, serving as executive producer from 2000 to 2001 and then executive producing That '80s Show in 2002. Wallem was also a co-executive producer on the HBO sitcom The Comeback.

In 2007, Wallem and Liz Brixius created and produced a pilot called Insatiable for Showtime which was not picked up. In 2008, the duo, along with writer Evan Dunsky, created the series Nurse Jackie, a half-hour drama about a "flawed" emergency room nurse in a New York City hospital. Starring Edie Falco, the series premiered on Showtime in June 2009, with Wallem and Brixius serving as showrunners for the series and sharing executive producer duties with Caryn Mandabach. Alongside Brixius, she left Nurse Jackie after its fourth season in 2012. The same year, she was announced as showrunner for the upcoming season of the NBC sitcom Up All Night before the show was cancelled.

== Personal life ==
Wallem is a lesbian. She previously dated Liz Brixius. Wallem married singer Melissa Etheridge on May 31, 2014, in San Ysidro Ranch in Montecito, California.
