= Nurse Jackie =

2009 American medical comedy-drama television series

- Genre: Medical drama Dark comedy Comedy drama
- Created by: Liz Brixius; Evan Dunsky; Linda Wallem
- Showrunners: Liz Brixius (seasons 1–4) Linda Wallem (seasons 1–4); Clyde Phillips (seasons 5–7)
- Starring: Edie Falco; Eve Best; Merritt Wever; Haaz Sleiman; Paul Schulze; Peter Facinelli; Dominic Fumusa; Anna Deavere Smith; Ruby Jerins; Mackenzie Aladjem; Stephen Wallem; Betty Gilpin; Adam Ferrara
- Theme music composer: Wendy & Lisa
- Country of origin: United States
- Original language: English
- No. of seasons: 7
- No. of episodes: 80 (list of episodes)

Production
- Executive producers: Liz Brixius; Caryn Mandabach; John Melfi; Linda Wallem; Richie Jackson; Mark Hudis; Christine Zander; Clyde Phillips; Tom Straw
- Producers: Brad Carpenter; Michele Giordano; Liz Flahive; Bari Halle; Allen Coulter (pilot only); Jerry Kupfer (pilot only)
- Production location: Baruch College
- Camera setup: Single camera
- Running time: 30 minutes
- Production companies: Caryn Mandabach Productions; Clyde Phillips Productions (seasons 5–7); Jackson Group Entertainment; Madison Grain Elevator (seasons 1–4); Lionsgate Television; De Long Lumber Company (seasons 1–4)

Original release
- Network: Showtime
- Release: June 8, 2009 – June 28, 2015

Nurse Jackie is an American medical comedy-drama television series that aired on Showtime from June 8, 2009, to June 28, 2015. Set in New York City, the series follows Jackie Peyton (Edie Falco), a drug-addicted emergency department nurse at the fictional All Saints Hospital.

The show was well received by critics, with specific praise directed towards the acting (particularly that of Falco and Merritt Wever) and the show's portrayal of addiction. Nurse Jackie received 24 Primetime Emmy Award nominations. Falco received six consecutive Emmy nominations for Outstanding Lead Actress in a Comedy Series, winning in 2010. Wever received two Emmy nominations for Outstanding Supporting Actress in a Comedy Series, winning in 2013.

In May 2023, it was announced that a sequel series was in development with Falco attached to star and executive produce.

== Development and production ==
The series was first conceived by executive producer Caryn Mandabach after being told various stories from an ER nurse about her experience on the job. Using the nurse's stories as an inspiration, Evan Dunsky developed a script for Showtime. By this time, the series had been under the title Nurse Mona and was a considerably darker version of the show with vague supernatural elements. Edie Falco initially passed on the project, but was very intrigued by the main character. Liz Brixius and Linda Wallem had written a pilot about addiction for Showtime titled Insatiable; the two were asked to rework Nurse Mona and infuse it with more comedy. Nurse Jackie was officially ordered by Showtime in June 2008, with Falco attached to star and the season to begin filming later that year. Co-creators Brixius and Wallem served as showrunners.

The story of Jackie's addiction was personal for Falco, Wallem, and Brixius, as all three were recovering alcoholics. According to Brixius, "There are massive consequences to addiction, that in order to keep using, you have to keep rationalizing and tell yourself a different story and underplay the damage that you're doing, and that is the interesting part of Jackie... And it's also where a lot of our comedy comes from. It's not that it's funny, it's that it's absurd." Producer Liz Flahive recalled the writing staff of Nurse Jackie was majority female and half-consisted of individuals from the LGBTQ community.

For the show's fourth season, which saw Jackie enter rehab and attempt sobriety, Falco said "the last thing I wanted was to give the impression that it's all fun and games, and isn't it funny what she gets away with. It's important that we are accurate as far as showing the ramifications of this kind of behavior." Wallem claims that she and Flahive were long opposed to the idea of Jackie entering rehab until it just seemed right for them: "It just hit me and it was like our own experiences of sobriety...during the break in between [seasons] three and four we had this long talk. We started to talk about what that would look like. I had to divorce myself from my own experience of rehab."

After the fourth season, Wallem and Brixius departed as showrunners. The two, who had been in a relationship prior to the start of the series, were said to be having major disagreements that were affecting production. Nurse Jackie was renewed for a fifth season on May 31, 2012, and Clyde Phillips was announced to be taking over as showrunner. In discussing his hiring, Phillips recalled that Showtime "wanted [the show] darker and funnier and with a greater sense of consequence. Jackie's been a drug addict trying to live a triple life and basically threw a hand grenade into everybody's lives. They wanted to see the effect of what happens when the shrapnel goes flying around."

On March 31, 2014, Showtime renewed Nurse Jackie for a seventh season, which was announced in September as the show's final season. The series finale saw Jackie overdose on street-grade heroin, though her fate was left ambiguous. According to Phillips, "It is left to the viewers to figure out... We had a long conversation with the network about it, and one of the things we wanted to do was to keep the conversation going after the show ends with a good and healthy debate because this is really a show about the effects of a ferocious disease—drug addiction—on an otherwise healthy person."

== Plot ==
| Season | Episodes | Originally released | |
| Season | Episodes | First released | Last released |
|---|---|---|---|
| 1 | 12 | June 8, 2009 | August 24, 2009 |
| 2 | 12 | March 22, 2010 | June 7, 2010 |
| 3 | 12 | March 28, 2011 | June 20, 2011 |
| 4 | 10 | April 8, 2012 | June 17, 2012 |
| 5 | 10 | April 14, 2013 | June 16, 2013 |
| 6 | 12 | April 13, 2014 | June 29, 2014 |
| 7 | 12 | April 12, 2015 | June 28, 2015 |

Jackie Peyton (Edie Falco) is an emergency department nurse at the fictional All Saints Hospital in New York City. She has two daughters and is married to her husband Kevin (Dominic Fumusa), although she is having an affair with the hospital pharmacist Eddie (Paul Schulze) in exchange for pills. Her allies at the hospital include Dr. Eleanor O'Hara (Eve Best), new nurse Zoey Barkow (Merritt Wever), and hard-lined administrator Gloria Akalitus (Anna Deavere Smith). Over the course of the first season, she spars with Dr. Fitch Cooper (Peter Facinelli), whom Jackie finds obnoxious, and tries to help her anxious daughter Grace (Ruby Jerins). Other All Saints staff members include Momo (Haaz Sleiman), Thor (Stephen Wallem), Sam (Arjun Gupta), Dr. Ike Prentiss (Morris Chestnut), Dr. Carrie Roman (Betty Gilpin), and Dr. Bernard Prince (Tony Shalhoub).

Jackie's affair with Eddie comes to an abrupt end when Eddie is fired and subsequently discovers that she's married. Despite this, he continues to try to ingrain himself into her life by becoming friends with Kevin. Eddie eventually returns to the hospital and he and Jackie remain friends, although she needs a new source for drugs. She begins faking back pain and asks that O'Hara provide her with medication. Meanwhile, O'Hara is left with a windfall of cash after her mother dies and insists on financing Jackie's daughter's education. Although Kevin refuses, Jackie secretly takes the money and uses it to pay off debts she's accrued from her drug habit. After inquiring about a fake MRI, O'Hara discovers that Jackie lied about her back pain and Kevin discovers she took the money without consulting him. Furious, he discovers Jackie's debt and comes to the conclusion that she's a drug addict. Kevin and O'Hara stage an intervention on Jackie but she insists that these expenses were for their daughters. Although she's able to repair her relationship with O'Hara, the Peyton marriage remains on the rocks.

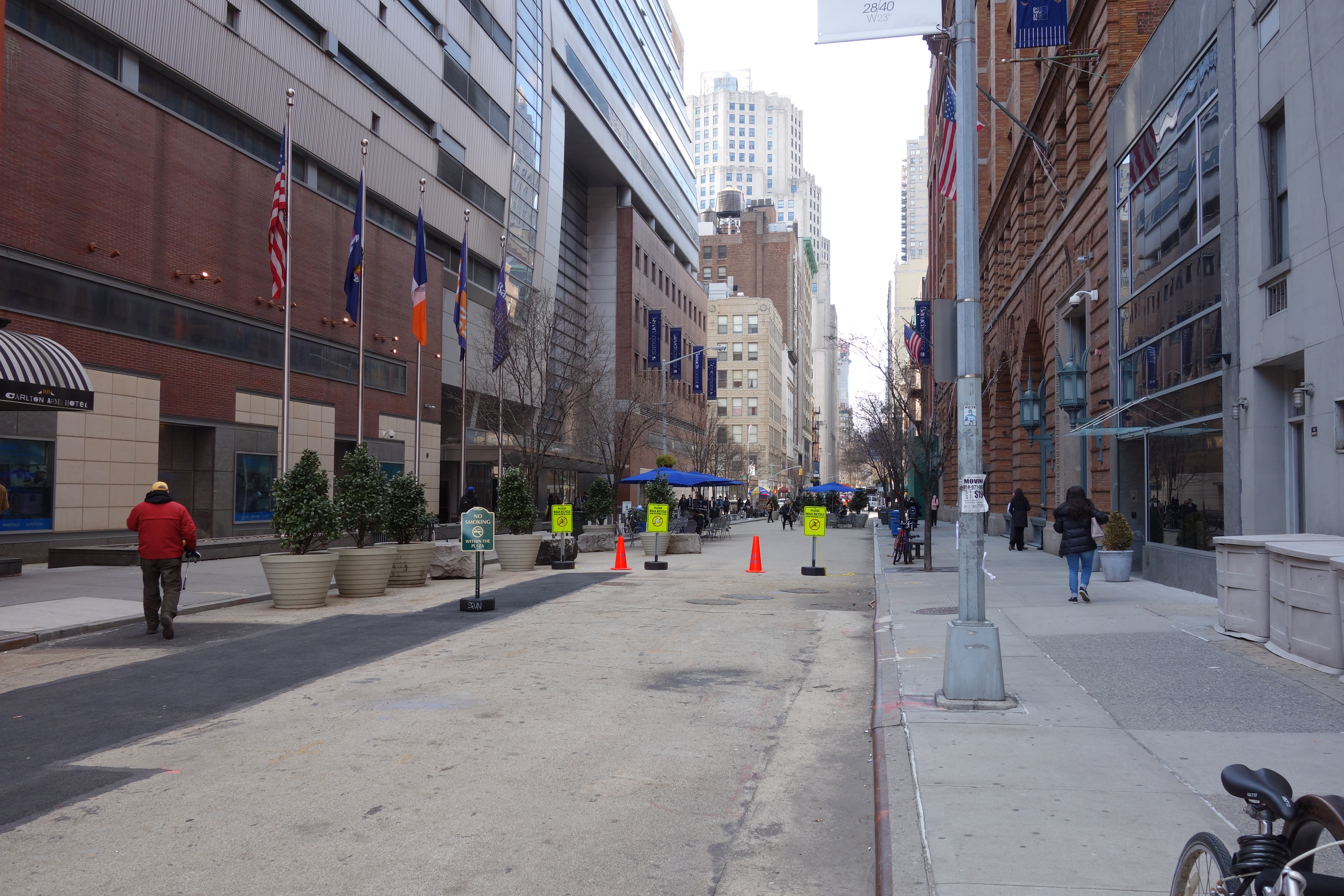

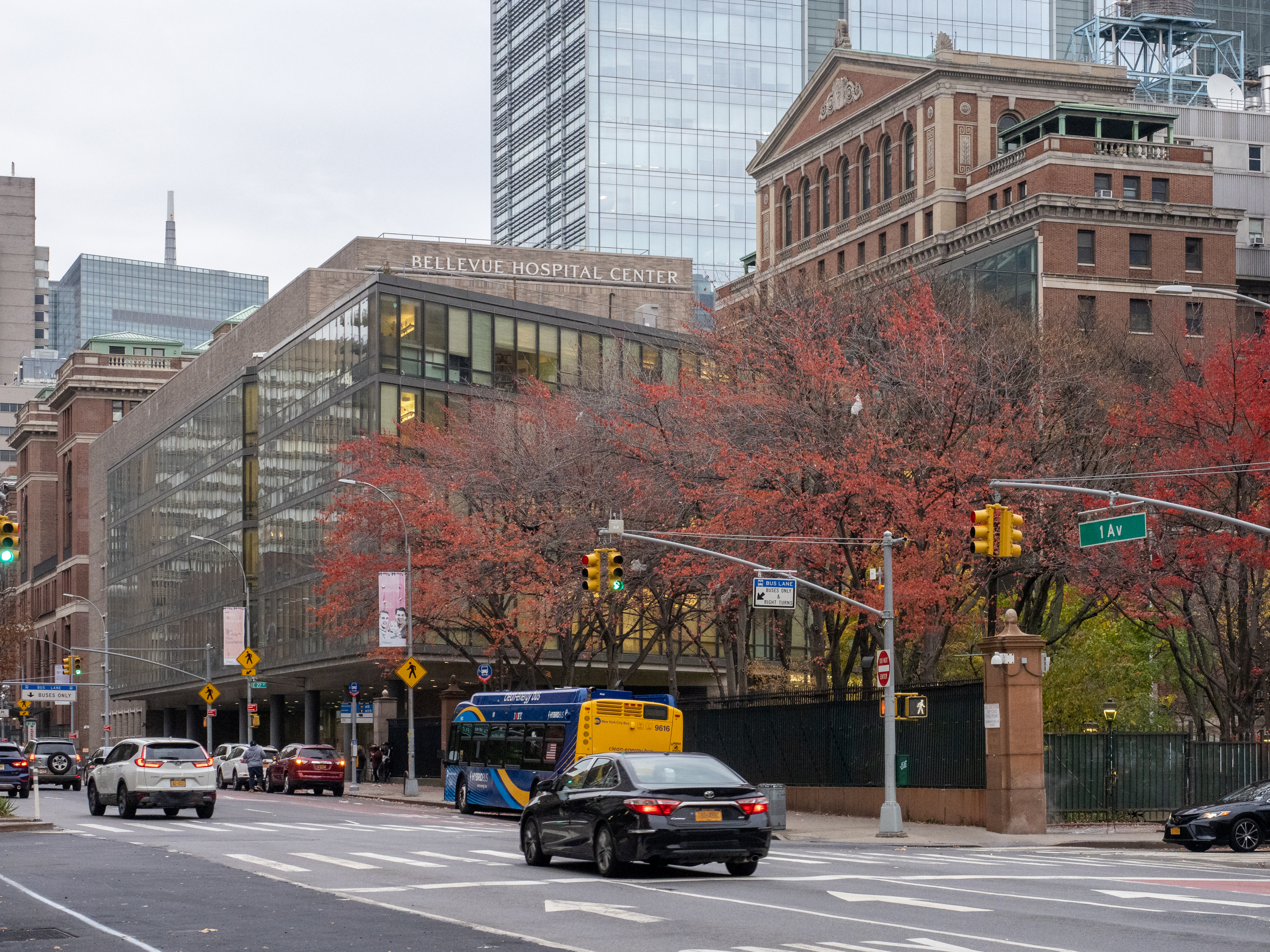
Baruch College (top) and Bellevue Hospital (bottom) were used as exteriors for All Saints Hospital.

Running low on pills, Jackie steals several thousand dollars' worth of drugs off an epileptic man having a seizure. He survives and meets with Jackie: he's an AA sponsor who begins supplying Jackie with pills in exchange for cash. He also gives Jackie AA coins that she's able to present to Kevin, falsely claiming to be seeking treatment for her addiction. After her dealer is hit by a bus in a freak accident, Jackie begins going through withdrawal and resorts to taking medication prescribed to her anxious daughter. This devastates O'Hara. Jackie also steals several fentanyl patches from the hospital and blames a temp nurse. This results in an investigation and Jackie's urine is collected, although Akalitus disposes of the specimen because she knows what the result will be. Meanwhile, Kevin reveals to Jackie that he had a brief affair. Although he's willing to work things out, she demands that he move out. Her addiction continues to worsen until she brings a junkie into her home who dies after they smoke heroin together. After calling O'Hara for help, Jackie breaks down and agrees to go to rehab.

All Saints is bought by a conglomerate called Quantum Bay with the new hospital administrator being Dr. Mike Cruz (Bobby Cannavale). Meanwhile, Jackie goes to rehab and connects with a young addict named Charlie. Although she leaves halfway through and returns to work, she remains committed to staying sober. Her personal life begins to fall apart as Kevin, upon learning she had an affair with Eddie and he supplied her drug habit, serves her with divorce papers and wants primary custody of their daughters. Jackie also spars with Dr. Cruz and his abrasive management style. After Charlie relapses, Jackie learns that he's the son of Dr. Cruz, and Cruz learns that she's his friend from rehab. Incensed, Cruz fires Akalitus and Eddie for covering up Jackie's addiction. As the All Saints staff begins to revolt against his increasingly rigid management, Jackie snaps and Cruz fires her. Charlie overdoses and is admitted to the ER; he dies as Jackie attends the birth of O'Hara's child.

Several months later, Jackie is still committed to her sobriety and has her job back at All Saints, along with Eddie and Akalitus, with Dr. Cruz having left after Charlie's death. Jackie is also going through divorce proceedings with Kevin. They're able to come to an agreement regarding the custody of their daughters as they finalize their divorce. Meanwhile, O'Hara moves back to England and Jackie begins dating a police officer named Frank (Adam Ferrara). Jackie learns that her increasingly rebellious daughter Grace is using drugs. Her relationship with Frank continues to develop. As she approaches one year of sobriety, everything in Jackie's life appears to be on the mend—however, on the day of her anniversary, she takes a pill.

Jackie reverts back to her old ways but has everyone in her life fooled into thinking she's still sober. To keep up the facade, she regularly attends AA meetings and even takes on a sponsor named Antoinette (Julie White). Frank catches her using and, naive to what addiction entails, Jackie's able to convince him it was a one-time thing. However, when Antoinette discovers this, she becomes increasingly worried about Jackie. After a failed attempt at detox, Antoinette continues insisting Jackie go to rehab. Ultimately, Jackie convinces Antoinette, an alcoholic, to fall off the wagon so they can both enter rehab together. As they both enter the rehab clinic intoxicated, Jackie abandons Antoinette there. She also breaks up with Frank and ramps up her drug use. Zoey, who has become Jackie's increasingly-astute protege over the seasons, suspects she's using after almost killing a patient. Akalitus demands that Jackie comply with a urine test or enter the hospital's diversion program, which includes the temporary suspension of her nursing license. Instead, Jackie attempts to leave town with a carful of meds to help hurricane relief victims in Miami. On the way to the airport, Jackie crashes her car into an ambulance and is arrested for drug trafficking.

After her arrest, Jackie is fired but, through the efforts of a cunning lawyer (Mark Feuerstein), she's able to enter the hospital's diversion program until the board can convene to discuss the reinstatement of her nursing license. Until then, she mops floors, wears beige scrubs, has her urine tested daily, but cannot touch patients. Zoey in particular is devastated by this arrangement as she's forced to supervise her former mentor. Akalitus also fires Eddie for supplying Jackie with the drugs she got arrested with. Eddie and Jackie rekindle their romantic relationship and begin selling drugs to pay for Jackie's expensive lawyer. After purging their stash at a pill mill, the two get engaged. Meanwhile, All Saints is bought by Norwegian developers set to convert the building into luxury condos. The nurses, particularly Zoey, begin protests to try to generate public outrage to block the deal. Jackie makes a deal with the Norwegian developers to dissuade Zoey from leading more public demonstrations in exchange for their help in reinstating Jackie's nursing license. Ultimately, the efforts of the nurses are futile, and the deal goes through.

The board convenes and, after a tumultuous hearing, reinstates Jackie's nursing license. Jackie immediately reverts to her drug use. Meanwhile, Eddie is busted from the pill mill operation and prepares for a one-year prison sentence. In the hospital's final days, O'Hara returns and confronts Jackie over her drug use. Jackie receives a job offer from Bellevue Hospital and wants Zoey to come with her; Zoey ultimately declines the offer and states that she needs to move on from Jackie. As the hospital throws a going away party, Jackie snorts several lines of street-grade heroin, taken from the belongings of a patient she had treated earlier in the day, and overdoses in the middle of their shindig; her fate is left ambiguous.

== Cast and characters ==
Showtime called Jackie Peyton a "strong-willed, iconoclastic New York City nurse juggling the frenzied grind of an urban hospital and an equally challenging personal life," noting that she had "an occasional weakness for Vicodin, Percocet, and Xanax to get her through the days." The main characters include Dr. Eleanor O'Hara (Eve Best), a British doctor and Jackie's best friend at work; Zoey Barkow (Merritt Wever), a spunky, inexperienced nursing student from a community college, "the perfect foil for Jackie's sharp angles"; Dr. Fitch Cooper (Peter Facinelli), "a likable 'golden boy' whose calm façade hides a nervous disposition"; and Eddie Walzer (Paul Schulze), a pharmacist with whom Jackie is having an affair at the beginning of the series.

Other characters include the officious hospital administrator Gloria Akalitus (Anna Deavere Smith), Jackie's bar owner husband Kevin (Dominic Fumusa), their daughters Grace (Ruby Jerins) and Fiona (Daisy Tahan in season 1 and Mackenzie Aladjem in seasons 3 through 7), and Thor (Stephen Wallem), Jackie's kindhearted confidant, played by the real-life brother of show creator/executive producer Linda Wallem.

=== Main ===
| Actor | Character | Seasons | | | | | | |
| Actor | Character | 1 | 2 | 3 | 4 | 5 | 6 | 7 |
|---|---|---|---|---|---|---|---|---|
| Edie Falco | Jackie Peyton | Main | Main | Main | Main | Main | Main | Main |
| Eve Best | Eleanor O'Hara | Main | Main | Main | Main | Main | | Guest |
| Merritt Wever | Zoey Barkow | Main | Main | Main | Main | Main | Main | Main |
| Haaz Sleiman | Mohammed de la Cruz | Main | | | | | | |
| Paul Schulze | Eddie Walzer | Main | Main | Main | Main | Main | Main | Main |
| Peter Facinelli | Fitch "Coop" Cooper | Main | Main | Main | Main | Main | Main | Main |
| Dominic Fumusa | Kevin Peyton | Recurring | Main | Main | Main | Main | Main | Main |
| Anna Deavere Smith | Gloria Akalitus | Recurring | Main | Main | Main | Main | Main | Main |
| Ruby Jerins | Grace Peyton | Recurring | Recurring | Main | Main | Main | Main | Main |
| Daisy Tahan / Mackenzie Aladjem | Fiona Peyton | Recurring | Recurring | Main | Main | Main | Main | Main |
| Bobby Cannavale | Miguel Cruz | | | | Main | Main | | |
| Morris Chestnut | Ike Prentiss | | | | | Main | Main | |
| Stephen Wallem | Thor Lundgren | Recurring | Recurring | Recurring | Recurring | Recurring | Main | Main |
| Betty Gilpin | Carrie Roman | | | | | Recurring | Main | Main |
| Adam Ferrara | Frank Verelli | | | | | Recurring | Main | |
| Tony Shalhoub | Bernard Prince | | | | | | | Main |

- Edie Falco as Jackie Peyton, RN; a senior ER nurse
- Eve Best as Eleanor O'Hara, MD; an ER surgeon, later Chief of Emergency Medicine
- Merritt Wever as Zoey Barkow, RN; an ER nurse, later ER charge-nurse
- Haaz Sleiman as Mohammed de la Cruz, RN; an ER nurse
- Paul Schulze as Eddie Walzer, PharmD.; the ER pharmacist
- Peter Facinelli as Fitch "Coop" Cooper, MD; an ER physician
- Dominic Fumusa as Kevin Peyton; Jackie's husband
- Anna Deavere Smith as Gloria Akalitus, RN; the ER administrator
- Ruby Jerins as Grace Peyton; Jackie's elder daughter
- Daisy Tahan (season 1) and Mackenzie Aladjem (seasons 2–7) as Fiona Peyton; Jackie's younger daughter
- Bobby Cannavale as Miguel Cruz, MD
- Morris Chestnut as Ike Prentiss, MD; a trauma surgeon and the Chief of Emergency Medicine
- Stephen Wallem as Thor Lundgren, RN; an ER nurse
- Betty Gilpin as Carrie Roman, MD; an ER physician
- Adam Ferrara as Frank Verelli; an NYPD Sergeant

=== Recurring cast ===
- Rene Ifrah as Officer Ryan (seasons 1–3)
- Arjun Gupta as Sam (seasons 1–4)
- Lenny Jacobson as Lenny (seasons 1–4)
- Michael Buscemi as God (seasons 1–4, 7)
- Bill Sage as Bill (seasons 2–3)
- Jaimie Alexander as Tunie Peyton (season 3)
- Gbenga Akinnagbe as Kelly Slater (seasons 3–4)
- Jake Cannavale as Charlie Cruz (season 4)
- Marcy Harriell as Marta (season 5)
- Laura Benanti as Mia Peyton (season 6)
- Julie White as Antoinette Mills (season 6)
- Michael Esper as Gabe (seasons 6–7)
- Tony Shalhoub as Bernard Prince, MD (season 7)
- Jeremy Shamos as Johanes Karlsen (season 7)
- Mark Feuerstein as Barry Wolfe (season 7)

== Reception ==
=== Critical reception ===
Critical response of Nurse Jackie
| Season | Rotten Tomatoes | Metacritic |
|---|---|---|
| 1 | 89% (35 reviews) | 76 (23 reviews) |
| 2 | 83% (24 reviews) | 75 (16 reviews) |
| 3 | 76% (17 reviews) | 79 (7 reviews) |
| 4 | 94% (17 reviews) | 83 (9 reviews) |
| 5 | 62% (13 reviews) | 66 (10 reviews) |
| 6 | 69% (13 reviews) | 64 (4 reviews) |
| 7 | 94% (16 reviews) | N/A |

The premiere of Nurse Jackie was met with generally positive reviews from critics, and received a Metacritic rating of 76 out of 100. Entertainment Weekly gave the first episode a B+, stating "Edie Falco brings a genial forcefulness to Nurse Jackie." New York magazine called the Showtime series "smart, acrid, alternately sharp and sentimental" and "the best series yet in the cable channel's ongoing meditation on the nature of addiction ... and the setting for a truly breakthrough female character." James Poniewozik from Time magazine ranked Nurse Jackie's episode "Tiny Bubbles" (106) as 5th on his Top 10 Episodes of 2009 list. Variety and Salon struck the primary sour notes, with Variety noting, "The series increasingly feels like all style and limited substance – a star showcase that's less 'triumphant return' than 'Nice to have you back, but...'" However, it was criticized by New York State Nurses Association, who claimed that the title character's violations of the nursing Code of Ethics promoted a negative image of nurses.

The second season also received positive reviews, with a Rotten Tomatoes score of 83% based on 24 reviews and the critics consensus reading, "While the tone begins to falter slightly in the second season, Nurse Jackie still triumphs due to Edie Falco's outstanding performance." Robert Bianco of USA Today gave the season a perfect score, stating: "What's remarkable is the fine balance producer/writers Linda Wallem and Liz Brixius maintain between the comic and tragic. Jackie can be a dark show, and it's going to get darker. But there isn't an episode that doesn't leave you yearning to see the next." Amelie Gillette of The A.V. Club was more mixed in her review of the season premiere, praising the actors but criticizing some of the dramatic elements: "Despite the rather lame drama swirling around her, Edie Falco's coolly exasperated Jackie still somehow rises above."

The third season also received positive reviews from critics, though less positive than the previous two. The season has a Rotten Tomatoes score of 76% based on 17 reviews, with the critics consensus reading: "The upheavals at All Saints Hospital still make for addicting television, but this third season suffers from formula fatigue as Jackie's actions continue to escape meaningful consequences." Kathy Sweeney of The Guardian said of the season, "You can't help feeling the show is treading water. True, she is a great nurse, if you overlook the fact she's whacked out of her head as she dispenses her unorthodox brand of healthcare, but it's getting increasingly hard to see Jackie as a sympathetic character." Verne Gay of Newsday was more positive, giving the season a B: "Comedy or drama? Drama or comedy? Nurse Jackie continues to have it both ways in the third season, which is certainly a smart strategy."

The fourth season received critical acclaim from critics, with a Rotten Tomatoes score of 94% based on 17 reviews and a critics consensus reading: "Nurse Jackie stages an intervention on the series' status quo, resulting in an exhilarating fourth season that restores the element of discovery and surprise." James Poniewozik of Time wrote: "This season's changes have really invigorated the series... The people around Jackie made me stick with this show even when its main storyline was going nowhere, but now that it's committed to really engaging with its title character, it's become appointment TV for me again.". June Thomas of Slate called the season a "triumph", singling out the final minutes of the season as "one of the most beautifully choreographed climaxes I've ever seen".

Season five received mixed-to-positive reviews. On Rotten Tomatoes, the season has a 62% based on 13 reviews with a critics consensus reading: "All Saints Hospital remains staffed with some of the most dependably terrific actors on television, but this fifth season feels bereft of new places to go and instead relapses back into the series' worst habits." Alan Sepinwall of Uproxx offered mixed opinions on the season, claiming "I don't want to call this a safe version of Nurse Jackie, but it was certainly a comfortable one: a fairly straightforward hospital show that sometimes tilted towards comedy, sometimes towards drama, but pretty meat-and-potatoes overall, albeit with the usual strong performances from Falco, Merritt Wever and company." Brian Lowry of Variety gave a mostly positive review, stating "Jackie remains watchable thanks primarily to Falco, although the best moments are almost invariably dramatic, not humorous."

Reception for the sixth season was more positive, with a Rotten Tomatoes score of 69% based on 13 reviews and the critics consensus reading: "Nurse Jackie matures into a disturbing chronicle of insurmountable addiction as Edie Falco's tragic protagonist hits rock bottom, but the sixth season's commitment to the repetition of drug abuse may prove too monotonous for some viewers." People magazine offered a positive review: "Jackie crosses the line from a show about a woman struggling with a pill addiction to simply a show about an addict. Jackie will either get clean—she's using again—or lose everything... Edie Falco makes the stakes scarily real." Matthew Gilbert of The Boston Globe praised the season's portrayal of addiction: "Nurse Jackie has grown into one of TV's most uncompromising series, a portrait of addiction that refuses, and then refuses all over again, to soften the truth or give viewers a comforting way out." Joel Keller of IndieWire criticized the season as derivative of the show's early years.

The seventh and final season received critical acclaim from critics. On Rotten Tomatoes, the season has a 94% based on 16 reviews and a critics consensus reading: "Nurse Jackie concludes with a harrowing and ultimately moving final season, granting the ensemble multiple grace notes while never diminishing the difficulty of addiction." Michelle Newman of Entertainment Weekly praised the final episode as "Heartbreaking. Because despite its complications, addiction is sad. And I think that's the only certain thing left to feel." Margaret Lyons of Vulture praised the show's portrayal of the main character, claiming: "That refusal to soften Jackie, that resistance to bend towards likability, is the show's most impressive feat." Variety ranked the final episode as one of TV's best series finales.

=== Genre ===
On August 29, 2010, at the 62nd Primetime Emmy Awards, in her acceptance speech for the Primetime Emmy Award for Outstanding Lead Actress in a Comedy Series, Falco exclaimed "I'm not funny!" Later, while speaking to the press, she expanded upon her statement and said that she felt her performance was dramatic. Several articles have since been written addressing this question, with some writers even calling for an overhaul of the Emmy categorization process as well as a "Comedy-Drama/Dramedy" category for the awards.

== Awards and nominations ==
Awards and nominations for Nurse Jackie
| Year | Association | Category | Nominee(s) | Result |
|---|---|---|---|---|
| 2010 | Golden Globe Award | Best Actress in a Television Series – Musical or Comedy | Edie Falco | Nominated |
| 2010 | Screen Actors Guild Award | Outstanding Performance by a Female Actor in a Comedy Series | Edie Falco | Nominated |
| 2010 | Primetime Emmy Award | Outstanding Comedy Series | Linda Wallem, Liz Brixius, John Melfi, Caryn Mandabach, Richie Jackson, Christine Zander, Mark Hudis, Rick Cleveland and Bari Halle | Nominated |
| 2010 | Primetime Emmy Award | Outstanding Lead Actress in a Comedy Series | Edie Falco | Won |
| 2010 | Primetime Emmy Award | Outstanding Guest Actor in a Comedy Series | Eli Wallach (for "Chicken Soup") | Nominated |
| 2010 | Primetime Emmy Award | Outstanding Directing for a Comedy Series | Allen Coulter (for "Pilot") | Nominated |
| 2010 | Primetime Emmy Award | Outstanding Casting for a Comedy Series | Julie Tucker and Ross Meyerson | Nominated |
| 2010 | Primetime Emmy Award | Outstanding Cinematography for a Half-Hour Series | Vanja Cernjul (for "Apple Bong") | Nominated |
| 2010 | Primetime Emmy Award | Outstanding Main Title Design | Stephen Fuller, Mark Gardner, Corey Weisz and Cara McKenney | Nominated |
| 2010 | Primetime Emmy Award | Outstanding Original Main Title Theme Music | Lisa Coleman and Wendy Melvoin | Won |
| 2011 | Golden Globe Award | Best Actress in a Television Series – Musical or Comedy | Edie Falco | Nominated |
| 2011 | Golden Globe Award | Best Television Series – Musical or Comedy | | Nominated |
| 2011 | Screen Actors Guild Award | Outstanding Performance by a Female Actor in a Comedy Series | Edie Falco | Nominated |
| 2011 | Primetime Emmy Award | Outstanding Lead Actress in a Comedy Series | Edie Falco | Nominated |
| 2011 | Primetime Emmy Award | Outstanding Casting for a Comedy Series | Julie Tucker and Ross Meyerson | Nominated |
| 2012 | Screen Actors Guild Award | Outstanding Performance by a Female Actor in a Comedy Series | Edie Falco | Nominated |
| 2012 | Primetime Emmy Award | Outstanding Lead Actress in a Comedy Series | Edie Falco | Nominated |
| 2012 | Primetime Emmy Award | Outstanding Supporting Actress in a Comedy Series | Merritt Wever | Nominated |
| 2012 | Primetime Emmy Award | Outstanding Guest Actor in a Comedy Series | Bobby Cannavale (for "Disneyland Sucks") | Nominated |
| 2012 | Primetime Emmy Award | Outstanding Casting for a Comedy Series | Julie Tucker and Ross Meyerson | Nominated |
| 2012 | Primetime Emmy Award | Outstanding Sound Mixing for a Comedy or Drama Series (Half-Hour) and Animation | Jan McLaughlin and Peter Waggoner (for "Handle Your Scandal") | Nominated |
| 2013 | Screen Actors Guild Award | Outstanding Performance by an Ensemble in a Comedy Series | | Nominated |
| 2013 | Screen Actors Guild Award | Outstanding Performance by a Female Actor in a Comedy Series | Edie Falco | Nominated |
| 2013 | Primetime Emmy Award | Outstanding Lead Actress in a Comedy Series | Edie Falco | Nominated |
| 2013 | Primetime Emmy Award | Outstanding Supporting Actress in a Comedy Series | Merritt Wever | Won |
| 2013 | Primetime Emmy Award | Outstanding Guest Actor in a Comedy Series | Bobby Cannavale (for "Walk of Shame") | Nominated |
| 2013 | Primetime Emmy Award | Outstanding Casting for a Comedy Series | Julie Tucker and Ross Meyerson | Nominated |
| 2013 | Primetime Emmy Award | Outstanding Sound Mixing for a Comedy or Drama Series (Half-Hour) and Animation | Jan McLaughlin and Peter Waggoner (for "Teachable Moments") | Won |
| 2014 | Golden Globe Award | Best Actress in a Television Series – Musical or Comedy | Edie Falco | Nominated |
| 2014 | Primetime Emmy Award | Outstanding Lead Actress in a Comedy Series | Edie Falco | Nominated |
| 2014 | Primetime Emmy Award | Outstanding Sound Mixing for a Comedy or Drama Series (Half-Hour) and Animation | Jan McLaughlin and Peter Waggoner (for "The Lady with the Lamp") | Won |
| 2015 | Golden Globe Award | Best Actress in a Television Series – Musical or Comedy | Edie Falco | Nominated |
| 2015 | Primetime Emmy Award | Outstanding Lead Actress in a Comedy Series | Edie Falco | Nominated |

== Broadcast ==
The June 8, 2009, series premiere was Showtime's most successful ever, with one million viewers for the premiere and over 350,000 for the repeat broadcast. Showtime immediately picked up the series for a second season.

Viewership and ratings per season of Nurse Jackie
| Season | Timeslot (ET) | Episodes | First aired | | Last aired | | Avg. viewers (millions) |
| Season | Timeslot (ET) | Episodes | Date | Viewers (millions) | Date | Viewers (millions) | Avg. viewers (millions) |
|---|---|---|---|---|---|---|---|
| 1 | Monday 10:30 pm | 12 | June 8, 2009 | 1.01 | August 24, 2009 | 0.992 | TBD |
| 2 | Monday 10:00 pm | 12 | March 22, 2010 | 1.08 | June 7, 2010 | 0.858 | TBD |
| 3 | Monday 10:00 pm | 12 | March 28, 2011 | 0.611 | June 20, 2011 | 0.832 | TBD |
| 4 | Sunday 9:00 pm | 10 | April 8, 2012 | 0.653 | June 17, 2012 | 0.535 | 0.56 |
| 5 | Sunday 9:00 pm | 10 | April 14, 2013 | 0.770 | June 16, 2013 | 0.751 | 0.75 |
| 6 | Sunday 9:00 pm | 12 | April 13, 2014 | 0.751 | June 29, 2014 | 0.674 | TBD |
| 7 | Sunday 9:00 pm | 12 | April 12, 2015 | 0.532 | June 28, 2015 | 0.835 | 0.70 |

== Home media ==
| Title | Episodes | Release date | | | | Additional |
| Title | Episodes | Region 1 | Region A | Region 2 | Region 4 | Additional |
|---|---|---|---|---|---|---|
| Season One | 12 | February 23, 2010 | | March 1, 2010 | June 2, 2010 | Features: Also available on Blu-ray Region B UK (released April 18, 2011); Also available as part of "Double Dose: Season 1 & 2" on Region 2 UK (released April 18, 2011) |
| Season Two | 12 | February 22, 2011 | | April 18, 2011 | May 4, 2011 | Features: Also available on Blu-ray Region B UK (released April 18, 2011); Also available as part of "Double Dose: Season 1 & 2" on Region 2 UK (released April 18, 2011) |
| Season Three | 12 | February 21, 2012 | | May 5, 2012 | September 5, 2012 | Features: Also available on Blu-ray Region B UK (released May 5, 2012) |
| Season Four | 10 | February 12, 2013 | | February 25, 2013 | July 4, 2013 | Features |
| Season Five | 10 | February 18, 2014 | | April 21, 2014 | March 20, 2014 | Features |
| Season Six | 12 | February 10, 2015 | | November 16, 2015 | February 26, 2015 | Features |
| Season Seven | 12 | October 20, 2015 | | January 11, 2016 | February 18, 2016 | Features |
| The Complete Series | 80 | No release | | April 25, 2016 | October 26, 2016 | Features |

== Foreign versions ==
- The Netherlands: Charlie: A Dutch remake of Nurse Jackie began production for Dutch TV Network, Nederland 3. Starring Halina Reijn, Katja Schuurman, and Benja Bruijning, the show began airing on March 13, 2013.
