= Caryn Mandabach =

American producer

- Education: Washington University in St. Louis
- Occupation: Television producer
- Years active: 1990-present
- Spouse: Kenneth Bolan

Caryn Mandabach is a UK-based American television producer notable for producing One Day at a Time, The Cosby Show, Roseanne, 3rd Rock from the Sun (1997–2001), That '70s Show (1998–2004) and Nurse Jackie. In the UK, she owns and also produced the series Peaky Blinders, which ran on Netflix and the BBC for six seasons from 2013 to 2022.

In addition to the BAFTA, Mandabach has won a Royal Television Society award and an Emmy. She has been honoured for her work by the Producers Guild, Women in Film, and the Hollywood Radio and Television Society, among others. Mandabach owns and operates CMP UK, currently producing Peaky Blinders. She divides her time between London and Dorset, where she resides with her husband, Kenneth Bolan.

Mandabach was quoted in a 2018 interview with Industrial Scripts stating that one of the reasons for the move was ownership. "I own Peaky Blinders, and I own my own company. I used to own, with my partners, bits of all my other shows. But in the United States there are no owners any more, it's all corporate."
