= 63rd Writers Guild of America Awards =

63rd WGA Awards
- Date: February 5, 2011
- Organized by: Writers Guild of America, East and the Writers Guild of America, West

The 63rd Writers Guild of America Awards honored the best film, television, and videogame writers of 2010. Winners were announced on February 5, 2011.

== Nominees ==
=== Film ===
==== Best Original Screenplay ====
Inception — written by Christopher Nolan; Warner Bros.

- Black Swan — screenplay by Mark Heyman and Andres Heinz and John McLaughlin; story by Andres Heinz; Fox Searchlight
- The Fighter — screenplay by Scott Silver, Paul Tamasy, Eric Johnson; story by Keith Dorrington, Paul Tamasy, and Eric Johnson; Paramount Pictures
- The Kids Are All Right — written by Lisa Cholodenko and Stuart Blumberg; Focus Features
- Please Give — written by Nicole Holofcener; Sony Pictures Classics

==== Best Adapted Screenplay ====
The Social Network — screenplay by Aaron Sorkin; based on the book The Accidental Billionaires by Ben Mezrich; Sony Pictures †

- 127 Hours — screenplay by Danny Boyle and Simon Beaufoy; based on the book Between a Rock and a Hard Place by Aron Ralston; Fox Searchlight
- I Love You Phillip Morris — written by John Requa and Glenn Ficarra; based on the book I Love You Phillip Morris: A True Story of Life, Love, and Prison Breaks by Steven McVicker; Roadside Attractions
- The Town — screenplay by Peter Craig, Ben Affleck, and Aaron Stockard; Based on the novel Prince of Thieves by Chuck Hogan; Warner Bros.
- True Grit — screenplay by Joel Coen and Ethan Coen; Based on the novel True Grit by Charles Portis; Paramount Pictures

==== Best Documentary Feature screenplay ====
Inside Job produced, written, and directed by Charles Ferguson; co-written by Chad Beck and Adam Bolt; Sony Pictures Classics

- Enemies of the People — written, directed, filmed and produced by Rob Lemkin and Thet Sambath; International Film Circuit
- Freedom Riders — written, produced, and directed by Stanley Nelson Jr.; Based in part on the book Freedom Riders: 1961 and the Struggle for Racial Justice by Raymond Arsenault; American Experience
- Gasland — written and directed by Josh Fox; HBO Documentary Films and International WOW Company
- The Two Escobars — written by Michael Zimbalist, Jeff Zimbalist; ESPN Films
- Who Is Harry Nilsson (And Why Is Everybody Talkin' About Him)? — written and directed by John Scheinfeld; Lorber Films

=== Television ===
==== Drama series ====
Mad Men — Jonathan Abrahams, Lisa Albert, Keith Huff, Jonathan Igla, Andre Jacquemetton, Maria Jacquemetton, Brett Johnson, Janet Leahy, Erin Levy, Tracy McMillan, Dahvi Waller, Matthew Weiner; AMC

- Boardwalk Empire — Meg Jackson, Lawrence Konner, Howard Korder, Steve Kornacki, Margaret Nagle, Tim Van Patten, Paul Simms, Terence Winter; HBO
- Breaking Bad — Sam Catlin, Vince Gilligan, Peter Gould, Gennifer Hutchison, George Mastras, Tom Schnauz, John Shiban, Moira Walley-Beckett; AMC
- Dexter — Scott Buck, Manny Coto, Charles H. Eglee, Lauren Gussis, Chip Johannessen, Jim Leonard, Clyde Phillips, Scott Reynolds, Melissa Rosenberg, Tim Schlattmann, Wendy West; Showtime
- Friday Night Lights — Bridget Carpenter, Kerry Ehrin, Ron Fitzgerald, Etan Frankel, Monica Henderson, David Hudgins, Rolin Jones, Jason Katims, Patrick Massett, Derek Santos Olson, John Zinman; NBC

==== Comedy series ====
Modern Family — Jerry Collins, Paul Corrigan, Alex Herschlag, Abraham Higginbotham, Elaine Ko, Joe Lawson, Steven Levitan, Christopher Lloyd, Dan O'Shannon, Jeffrey Richman, Brad Walsh, Ilana Wernick, Bill Wrubel, Danny Zuker; ABC

- 30 Rock — Jack Burditt, Hannibal Buress, Kay Cannon, Robert Carlock, Tom Ceraulo, Vali Chandrasekaran, Tina Fey, Jon Haller, Steve Hely, Matt Hubbard, Dylan Morgan, Paula Pell, John Riggi, Josh Siegal, Ron Weiner, Tracey Wigfield; NBC
- Glee — Ian Brennan, Brad Falchuk, Ryan Murphy; Fox
- Nurse Jackie — Liz Brixius, Rick Cleveland, Nancy Fichman, Liz Flahive, Jennifer Hoppe-House, Mark Hudis, Linda Wallem, Christine Zander; Showtime
- The Office — Jennifer Celotta, Daniel Chun, Greg Daniels, Lee Eisenberg, Brent Forrester, Amelie Gillette, Charlie Grandy, Steve Hely, Jonathan A. Hughes, Mindy Kaling, Carrie Kemper, Jason Kessler, Paul Lieberstein, Warren Lieberstein, B. J. Novak, Peter Ocko, Robert Padnick, Aaron Shure, Justin Spitzer, Gene Stupnitsky, Halsted Sullivan, Jon Vitti; NBC

==== New series ====
Boardwalk Empire — Meg Jackson, Lawrence Konner, Howard Korder, Steve Kornacki, Margaret Nagle, Tim Van Patten, Paul Simms, Terence Winter; HBO

- Justified — Dave Andron, Wendy Calhoun, Benjamin Cavell, Fred Golan, Gary Lennon, Benjamin Daniel Lobato, Chris Provenzano, Graham Yost; FX
- Men of a Certain Age — Bridget Bedard, Tucker Cawley, Warren Hutcherson, Rick Muirragui, Jack Orman, Ray Romano, Mike Royce, Lew Schneider, Mark Stegemann; TNT
- Treme — Lolis Eric Elie, David Mills, Eric Overmyer, George Pelecanos, Tom Piazza, Davis Rogan, David Simon; HBO
- The Walking Dead — Frank Darabont; Charles H. Eglee, Adam Fierro, Robert Kirkman, Jack LoGiudice, Glen Mazzara; AMC

==== Episodic drama – any length – one airing time ====
"The Chrysanthemum and the Sword" (Mad Men) — Erin Levy; AMC

- "Boom" (The Good Wife) — Ted Humphrey; CBS
- "The End" (Lost) — Damon Lindelof & Carlton Cuse; ABC
- "Help Me" (House) — Russel Friend & Garrett Lerner & Peter Blake; Fox
- "I.F.T." (Breaking Bad) — George Mastras; AMC
- "I See You" (Breaking Bad) — Gennifer Hutchison; AMC

==== Episodic comedy – any length – one airing time ====
"When It Rains, It Pours" (30 Rock) — Robert Carlock; NBC

- "Anna Howard Shaw Day" (30 Rock) — Matt Hubbard; NBC
- "Earthquake" (Modern Family) — Paul Corrigan & Brad Walsh; ABC
- "Nightmayor" (The Sarah Silverman Program) — Dan Sterling; Comedy Central
- "Starry Night" (Modern Family) — Danny Zuker; ABC
- "Wuphf.com" (The Office) — Aaron Shure; NBC

==== Long form – original – over one hour – one or two parts, one or two airing times ====
The Special Relationship — Peter Morgan; HBO

- You Don't Know Jack — Adam Mazer; HBO

==== Long form – adaptation – over one hour – one or two parts, one or two airing times ====
The Pacific, "Part Eight" — Robert Schenkkan and Michelle Ashford, Based in part on the books Helmet for My Pillow by Robert Leckie and With The Old Breed by Eugene B. Sledge with additional material from Red Blood, Black Sand by Chuck Tatum and China Marine by Eugene B. Sledge; HBO

- The Pacific, “Part Four” — Robert Schenkkan and Graham Yost, Based in part on the books Helmet for My Pillow by Robert Leckie and With The Old Breed by Eugene B. Sledge with additional material from Red Blood, Black Sand by Chuck Tatum and China Marine by Eugene B. Sledge; HBO
- The Pillars if the Earth — Written for television by John Pielmeier, Based on the book The Pillars of the Earth by Ken Follett; Starz
- Temple Grandin — Teleplay by Christopher Monger and William Merritt Johnson, Based on the books Emergence by Temple Grandin and Margaret Scariano and Thinking in Pictures by Temple Grandin; HBO

==== Animation – any length – one airing time ====
"The Prisoner of Benda" (Futurama) — Ken Keeler; Comedy Central

- "Lrrreconcilable Ndndifferences" (Futurama) — Patric M. Verrone; Comedy Central
- "Moe Letter Blues" (The Simpsons) — Stephanie Gillis; Fox
- "O Brother, Where Bart Thou?" (The Simpsons) — Matt Selman; Fox
- "Treasure Hunt" (Back at the Barnyard) — Tom Sheppard; Nickelodeon

==== Comedy/variety – (including talk) series ====
The Colbert Report — Barry Julien, Dan Guterman, Eric Drysdale, Frank Lesser, Glenn Eichler, Jay Katsir, Max Werner, Meredith Scardino, Michael Brumm, Opus Moreschi, Peter Gwinn, Rich Dahm, Rob Dubbin, Scott Sherman, Stephen Colbert, Tom Purcell, Peter Grosz and Paul Dinello; Comedy Central

- Penn & Teller: Bullshit! — Penn Jillette, Teller, Star Price, David Wechter, Michael Goudeau, Steve Melcher, Tom Kramer, Rich Nathanson; Showtime
- Saturday Night Live — Head Writer: Seth Meyers; Writers: Doug Abeles, James Anderson, Alex Baze, Jillian Bell, Hannibal Buress, Jessica Conrad, James Downey, Steve Higgins, Colin Jost, Erik Kenward, Jessi Klein, Rob Klein, John Lutz, Seth Meyers, Lorne Michaels, John Mulaney, Christine Nangle, Michael Patrick O’Brien, Paula Pell, Ryan Perez, Simon Rich, Marika Sawyer, Akiva Schaffer, John Solomon, Emily Spivey, Kent Sublette, Jorma Taccone, Bryan Tucker; NBC
- The Daily Show with Jon Stewart — Rory Albanese, Kevin Bleyer, Richard Blomquist, Steve Bodow, Tim Carvell, Wyatt Cenac, Hallie Haglund, JR Havlan, Elliott Kalan, Josh Lieb, Sam Means, Jo Miller, John Oliver, Daniel Radosh, Jason Ross, Jon Stewart; Comedy Central

==== Comedy/variety – music, awards, tributes – specials ====
National Memorial Day Concert 2010 — Joan Meyerson; PBS

- The Simpsons 20th Anniversary Special – In 3-D! On Ice! — Jeremy Chilnick, Morgan Spurlock; Fox
- Jimmy Kimmel Live: After the Academy Awards — Tony Barbieri, Jonathan Bines, Will Burke, Gary Greenberg, Sal Iacono, Jimmy Kimmel, Jonathan Kimmel, Jacob Lentz, Molly McNearney, Bryan Paulk, Rick Rosner; ABC

==== Daytime drama ====
As the World Turns — Susan Dansby, Lucky Gold, Janet Iacobuzio, Penelope Koechl, David Kreizman, Leah Laiman, David A. Levinson, Leslie Nipkow, Jean Passanante, Gordon Rayfield, David Smilow; CBS

- General Hospital — Meg Bennett, Nathan Fissell, David Goldschmid, Robert Guza Jr., Karen Harris, Elizabeth Korte, Mary Sue Price, David F. Ryan, Tracey Thomson, Michele Val Jean, Susan Wald; ABC
- One Life to Live — Shelly Altman, Ron Carlivati, Anna Theresa Cascio, Aida Croal, Carolyn Culliton, Frederick Johnson, Elizabeth Page, Gordon Rayfield, Melissa Salmons, Katherine Schock, Scott Sickles, Courtney Simon, Chris VanEtten; ABC

==== Children's episodic & specials ====
"Happy Ha-Ha Holidays" (Imagination Movers) — Michael G. Stern, Randi Barnes, Rick Gitelson, Scott Gray; Disney Channel

- "True Magic" (True Jackson, VP) — Andy Gordon; Nickelodeon

==== Children's script – long form or special ====
Avalon High — Teleplay by Julie Sherman Wolfe and Amy Talkington, Based on the novel by Meg Cabot; Disney Channel

- The Boy Who Cried Werewolf — Art Brown, Douglas Sloan; Nickelodeon

==== Documentary – current events ====
"Flying Cheap" (Frontline) — Rick Young; PBS

- "College, Inc." (Frontline) — Martin Smith, John Maggio; PBS
- "The Card Game" (Frontline) — Lowell Bergman, Oriana Zill de Granados; PBS
- "The Quake" (Frontline) — Martin Smith, Marcela Gaviria; PBS
- "The Vaccine War" (Frontline) — Jon Palfreman; PBS
- "The Warning" (Frontline) — Michael Kirk; PBS

==== Documentary – other than current events ====
"Wyatt Earp" (American Experience) — Rob Rapley; PBS

- Baseball: The Tenth Inning, "Episode 1" — David McMahon, Lynn Novick, Ken Burns; PBS
- "Dolley Madison" (American Experience) — Ronald H. Blumer; PBS
- "Hubble’s Amazing Rescue" (Nova) — Rushmore DeNooyer; PBS
- "LBJ’s Path to War" (Bill Moyers Journal) — Bill Moyers, Michael Winship; PBS
- "Riddles of the Sphinx" (Nova) — Gary Glassman; PBS

==== News – regularly scheduled, bulletin or breaking report ====
"Sunday Morning Almanac" (CBS Sunday Morning) — Thomas A. Harris; CBS News

- "The Flash Crash" (CBS News) — R. Polly Leider; CBS News

==== News – analysis, feature, or commentary ====
"Resurrecting Eden" (60 Minutes) — Jenny Dubin; CBS

- "Democracy for Sale" (Bill Moyers Journal) — Bill Moyers, Michael Winship; PBS
- "Making the Band, Making the Difference" (Good Morning America) — Mary Pflum; ABC News

=== Radio ===
==== Documentary ====
2009 Year in Review — Gail Lee; CBS Radio News

==== News – regularly scheduled or breaking report ====
CBS World News Roundup — Paul Farry; CBS Radio News

- Evening News Headlines 7/28/10 — Bill Spadaro; 1010 WINS Radio

==== News – analysis, feature, or commentary ====
"Passages" — Gail Lee; CBS Radio News

- "Dishin Digital" — Robert Hawley; CBS Radio News

=== Promotional writing and graphic animation ===
==== On-air promotion (radio or television) ====
CSI Promos — Anne de Vega; CBS

- NBC News Promos — Jennifer Kaas; NBC News

==== Television graphic animation ====
"Sunday Morning, By Design" (CBS Sunday Morning) — Graphic Designer: Bob Pook, Graphic Artist: Diane Robinson; CBS News

==== Video game writing ====
Assassin's Creed: Brotherhood — Story by Patrice Desilets, Jeffrey Yohalem, Corey May; Lead Script Writer: Jeffrey Yohalem; Script Writers: Ethan Petty, Nicholas Grimwood, Matt Turner; Ubisoft

- Fallout: New Vegas — Creative Design Lead/Lead Writer: John Gonzalez; Writers: Chris Avellone, Eric Fenstermaker, Travis Stout; Additional Writing: Tess Treadwell, George Ziets, Jason Bergman, Nick Breckon, Matt Grandstaff, Will Noble, Andrew Scharf; Bethesda Softworks
- God of War III — Marianne Krawczyk; Additional Writing by Stig Asmussen, Ariel Lawrence, William Weissbaum; Sony Computer Entertainment
- Prince of Persia: The Forgotten Sands (Wii) — Writer: Benjamin McCaw; Story Dialogue Editor: Marianne Krawczyk; Ubisoft
- Singularity — Marc Guggenheim, Lindsey Allen, Emily Silver; Additional Story and Writing: Jason Henderson, Adam Foshko, Michael Cassutt; Story and Script Consultant: Adam Foshko; Activision
- Star Wars: The Force Unleashed II — Executive Producer-Writer: Haden Blackman; In-Game Script: David Collins, John Stafford, Cameron Suey; Additional Writing: Tid Cooney, Ian Dominguez, Tony Rowe; LucasArts

=== New media writing ===
==== Outstanding achievement in writing original new media ====
"The Real Thing", "Identity Crisis", "Girl Talk", "Naming Things", "Curtain Up" (Anyone But Me) — Susan Miller, Tina Cesa Ward; www.AnyoneButMeSeries.com

- "Episode 1", "Episode 4", "Episode 5", "Episode 6", "Episode 7" (All's Faire) — Thom Woodley & Bob McClure & Matt Yeager; www.Allsfaire.tv
- "Episode 1: We’ve Got Flash", "Episode 2: Complimentary Sandwiches", "Episode 3: Perfect Resume Builder" (Concierge: The Series), Written by Timothy Cooper, www.ConciergeTheSeries.com
- "Zac" (Madison Avery) — Gregory Storm; www.stormfactory.com

==== Outstanding achievement in writing derivative new media ====
"Strip Pong", "Tear Jerks", "Brainstorm" (Frank vs. Lutz) — Jon Haller; 30 Rock New Media, www.nbc.com

- "Webisode One: Moving On", "Webisode Two: Lights, Camera, Action!", "Webisode Three: The Final Product" (The 3rd Floor, The Office Webisodes) — Kelly Hannon, Jonathan Hughes, Mary Wall; www.nbc.com
