= List of Grace and Frankie episodes =

Grace and Frankie is an American comedy television series that premiered on Netflix on May 8, 2015. The series was created by Marta Kauffman and Howard J. Morris and stars Jane Fonda and Lily Tomlin as Grace and Frankie, two women whose lives change when their husbands announce that they are in love with each other and want to marry. The series also stars Sam Waterston, Martin Sheen, Brooklyn Decker, Ethan Embry, June Diane Raphael and Baron Vaughn in supporting roles.

On September 4, 2019, Grace and Frankie was renewed for a seventh and final season of 16 episodes. A total of 94 episodes were created during the series' run from May 8, 2015, to April 29, 2022.

== Series overview ==
Season	Episodes		Originally released
1	13		May 8, 2015
2	13		May 6, 2016
3	13		March 24, 2017
4	13		January 19, 2018
5	13		January 18, 2019
6	13		January 15, 2020
7	16	4	August 13, 2021
7	16	12	April 29, 2022

== Episodes ==
=== Season 1 (2015) ===
No. overall	No. in season	Title	Directed by	Written by	Original release date
1	1	"The End"	Tate Taylor	Marta Kauffman & Howard J. Morris	May 8, 2015
Grace Hanson and Frankie Bergstein are brought to dinner by their lawyer husbands, Robert and Sol, under the assumption that the men are going to announce they are retiring, but the women are shocked when their husbands reveal they are actually leaving them, for each other, and want to get married now that same-sex marriage is legal. The men also reveal that they have been having an affair with each other for more than 20 years. The news quickly spreads to their horrified children. Despite their stark personality differences, Grace and Frankie strike up a bond when they both seek escape at the beach house the couples share.
2	2	"The Credit Cards"	Scott Winant	Marta Kauffman & Howard J. Morris	May 8, 2015
Grace and Frankie are adjusting to living with each other, but the discovery that Robert and Sol have cut off their credit cards leaves them fuming. Frankie contemplates moving back to her home, since Sol is living with Robert, but eventually decides to stay with Grace at the beach house so they can continue supporting one another. Grace and Robert's daughter Mallory is caught between her parents when she picks up some things from Robert's for Grace, and later she bumps into Frankie and Sol's son, Coyote, with whom she has a troubled history.
3	3	"The Dinner"	Bryan Gordon	Nancy Fichman & Jennifer Hoppe-House	May 8, 2015
Robert and Sol host a dinner party for their children, but they object to having to keep it a secret from Grace and Frankie. Meanwhile, the women have decided to take their minds off the impending divorce by returning to work. However, Grace and Robert's daughter Brianna, who now operates Grace's cosmetics company, refuses to let her return for fear of being overshadowed, and Frankie's attempt to apply for an art teacher position is derailed due to a misunderstanding. Mallory has to come to terms with being in the same room as Coyote, and they eventually agree to put their troubles behind them.
4	4	"The Funeral"	Tim Kirkby	Alexa Junge	May 8, 2015
The funeral of Robert and Sol's law partner throws them, Grace and Frankie together in public since the split. Frankie is upset when Grace ditches her to spend time with Lydia, Robert's sister, and later Grace fears that Frankie has overheard her say that she is "stuck with her". Robert is surprised to find that he misses Grace almost as much as Sol misses Frankie.
5	5	"The Fall"	Betty Thomas	Billy Finnegan	May 8, 2015
Brianna convinces Grace to set up an online dating profile, but winds up getting high with Frankie. They convince Grace to take them to get frozen yogurt, where Grace takes a nasty fall and breaks her hip. A series of comical and concerning events follow at the hospital, culminating in Grace's realization of how much Frankie means to her.
6	6	"The Earthquake"	Tristram Shapeero	Jacquelyn Reingold	May 8, 2015
A minor earthquake triggers Frankie's seismophobia, prompting Sol to drop everything to comfort her. Frankie questions how things with Robert started, and it is obvious there are still unresolved feelings between them. Grace goes on an date with a man she met online, but takes a face to one of Frankie's troublesome students when the date goes disastrously wrong. Meanwhile, Coyote attempts to give Mallory a gift, but bumps into Mallory's aggressive husband Mitch, who is far from thrilled to see him.
7	7	"The Spelling Bee"	Tim Kirkby	Julieanne Smolinski	May 8, 2015
Frankie and Sol are both excited to watch the national spelling bee, but are disappointed to find that Grace and Robert are not interested. Grace is saved from a disastrous date by Guy, an old friend of Robert's who is looking to give up his life of adventure. Brianna gets a dog as an escape from her disastrous dating life, but finds herself attracted to the dog's foster owner.
8	8	"The Sex"	Dennie Gordon	David Budin & Brendan McCarthy	May 8, 2015
Grace is ready to take things to the next level with Guy, but finds herself uncomfortable with the idea of being intimate after years of (not) having sex with Robert. However, Frankie is on hand with her homemade organic lube. Frankie realizes her friend Jacob is flirting with her. Sol and Robert clear out Brianna's old room but Sol is terrified of Brianna. Bud and Coyote have a brotherly talk.
9	9	"The Invitation"	Matt Shakman	Billy Finnegan	May 8, 2015
Frankie is upset when Grace receives an invitation to Sol and Robert's wedding and she does not, but soon realizes that she needs to set boundaries with her ex-husband. Grace is frustrated when Robert gate-crashes a day out golfing with Guy. Looking for a new angle for her business, Brianna discovers Frankie's homemade lube and, after making all her colleagues experiment with it, realizes its potential.
10	10	"The Elevator"	Miguel Arteta	Laura Jacqmin	May 8, 2015
Frankie, Grace, Sol, Robert and Bud become trapped in an elevator after signing their divorce papers, and remember a pivotal weekend spent at the beach house five years previously. Sol and Robert plan to tell Grace and Frankie about their affair but are interrupted by the arrival of the kids, including a heavily pregnant Mallory and Coyote in the height of his drug addiction. As events escalate, Mallory gives birth, Grace decides Brianna should take over her business, and Bud discovers his father's relationship with Robert but decides to keep quiet.
11	11	"The Secrets"	Andrew McCarthy	Nancy Fichman & Jennifer Hoppe-House	May 8, 2015
When Grace is reunited with Byron, Frankie's student who kissed Grace the day of the earthquake, she confides in Frankie, who promptly tells Sol, leading to both Robert and Guy finding out - setting off multiple arguments in both houses. Sol is furious to discover that Robert slept with another man 10 years ago when they had stopped seeing each other. Brianna gets closer with her charming co-worker, Barry, but their date is gatecrashed by Coyote and Bud.
12	12	"The Bachelor Party"	Julie Anne Robinson	Jacquelyn Reingold	May 8, 2015
Coyote and Bud enlist Brianna and Mallory's help with arranging a bachelor party for Robert and Sol, but there are differing opinions on what they would like. Things get worse when Robert's conservative former boss arrives. Grace and Frankie hit the town for a "yes night" in an attempt to cheer Frankie up during her Sol purge.
13	13	"The Vows"	Dean Parisot	Marta Kauffman & Howard J. Morris & Alexa Junge	May 8, 2015
It is the week before Robert and Sol's wedding, and Robert is struggling to write vows so ropes in Brianna and Mallory's help. Grace decides she needs to break up with Guy, but it's not as straight-forward as she'd like. Frankie is determined to move on from Sol and helps him clear out their family home, but complications arise when they spontaneously sleep together.

=== Season 2 (2016) ===
No. overall	No. in season	Title	Directed by	Written by	Original release date
14	1	"The Wish"	Dean Parisot	Marta Kauffman & Howard J. Morris	May 6, 2016
Robert is rushed to hospital after having a heart attack, stopping Sol's plans to tell him about his night with Frankie. With life-threatening surgery looming, Robert convinces Sol to marry him, and Grace and Frankie are forced to help, despite Frankie's guilt about the infidelity and Grace's immense fear that Robert won't survive surgery. The kids find out Sol and Frankie slept together. Mallory reveals she is pregnant with twins.
15	2	"The Vitamix"	Rebecca Asher	Alexa Junge	May 6, 2016
Grace and Frankie agree to go to pick up some things from Robert and Sol's house ahead of them coming home, but it brings up bitter memories for both of them. Brianna, Mallory and Bud help Sol deal with Robert's health insurance, while Mallory breaks the news of her pregnancy to her father.
16	3	"The Negotiation"	Trent O'Donnell	Billy Finnegan	May 6, 2016
Negotiations between Frankie and Brianna over the former's yam lube get tough, while Frankie reconnects with Jacob. Grace feels threatened when Mitch's mother, Jean, arrives in town and fights for her grandchildren’s affection.
17	4	"The Road Trip"	Arlene Sanford	Nancy Fichman & Jennifer Hoppe-House	May 6, 2016
Frankie convinces Grace to track down her former flame, Phil, and the two set out on a trip to find him. However, the reunion does not turn out as expected. Sol is racked with guilt as he continues to lie to Robert.
18	5	"The Test"	Andy Ackerman	John Hoffman	May 6, 2016
Bud and Coyote become concerned when Frankie's memory shows signs of deterioration as she attempts to pass her driving test. Grace decides to reconnect with old friends, but the afternoon leads to a big life realisation.
19	6	"The Chicken"	Jann Turner	Julie Durk	May 6, 2016
Unable to keep his lie any longer, Sol admits to Robert that he slept with Frankie, and the latter furiously throws his new husband out. Grace takes up mentoring and coaches a young bartender. Frankie is conflicted over Jacob's desire for romance.
20	7	"The Boar"	Michael Showalter	Julieanne Smolinski	May 6, 2016
Grace intervenes after Robert and Sol's big fight, while a stressed out Frankie visits Jacob and learns another surprising secret. A message from Phil startles Grace.
21	8	"The Anchor"	Melanie Mayron	David Budin & Brendan McCarthy	May 6, 2016
Frankie takes a furious stand against Brianna and her non-eco-friendly plans for the Yam lube. Phil and Grace meet for lunch, but he drops the bombshell that he is still married, though his wife has Alzheimer's, putting Grace is a conflicting situation. Robert continues to reject a despairing Sol.
22	9	"The Goodbyes"	Jason Ensler	Nancy Fichman & Jennifer Hoppe-House	May 6, 2016
Coyote's birth mother arrives in town from Baton Rouge and Frankie invites her to a family lunch, but the day quickly dissolves into chaos. Grace is adamant she cannot be with a married Phil, but her desire gets the better of her. Robert meets a new friend at the dog park.
23	10	"The Loophole"	Lee Rose	Billy Finnegan	May 6, 2016
Despite enjoying a passionate night with Phil, Grace's conscience forces her to end things with him, for the sake of his wife. Sol and Robert's ongoing fight comes to a head when they get involved in Frankie and Brianna's lube battle.
24	11	"The Bender"	Alex Hardcastle	Brooke Wied & Alex Burnett	May 6, 2016
Grace goes on a booze-filled bender after her painful breakup with Phil and Frankie is reunited with her beloved old friend, Babe, who needs help in throwing an unforgettable party. Robert and Sol discuss how to move forward now that they are back together. Bud and Coyote meet Jacob, but Grace crosses a line when Frankie tries to help.
25	12	"The Party"	Wendey Stanzler	Alexa Junge	May 6, 2016
Grace is shocked when Frankie reveals Babe has terminal cancer and wants the two women to help her die at the party. Sol and Robert decide to sell their house to start afresh.
26	13	"The Coup"	Rebecca Asher	Marta Kauffman & Howard J. Morris	May 6, 2016
Gifts from a departed Babe prompt Grace and Frankie to re-evaluate their lives. Long-held secrets and lies are uncovered at a birthday party for Bud where Grace and Frankie announce they are going into business making vibrators for older women – much to the horror of their children.

=== Season 3 (2017) ===
No. overall	No. in season	Title	Directed by	Written by	Original release date
27	1	"The Art Show"	Marta Kauffman	Marta Kauffman & Howard J. Morris	March 24, 2017
Frankie's art show approaches and Grace is determined to have a business loan to show her sceptical family. Robert and Sol move into a new house and Sol is desperate to patch things up with Frankie. Bud brings his eccentric new girlfriend, Allison, to the art show. Brianna tells Grace she and Barry are dating, but the two end up having conflicting ideas for their future. At Sol's invitation, Kenny Loggins makes a surprise appearance at Frankie's art show.
28	2	"The Incubator"	Arlene Sanford	Billy Finnegan	March 24, 2017
Grace and Frankie head to a business incubator in an attempt to get funding for their new venture, but Jacob's involvement irks Grace. Robert and Sol ponder the thought of retirement and Brianna offers to give Frankie the £75,000 needed for the ladies’ vibrator prototype, unbeknownst to Grace who is tricked into thinking Jacob donated them the money.
29	3	"The Focus Group"	Ken Whittingham	Wil Calhoun	March 24, 2017
Robert confesses to Sol that he is finally ready to retire but the latter fears leaving work, as he can't see a future for himself outside of it. Robert is introduced to community theatre. Meanwhile, Grace and Frankie host a focus group to introduce their product, but they quickly realise their clientele is not the desired demographic.
30	4	"The Burglary"	Alex Hardcastle	Brendan McCarthy & David Budin	March 24, 2017
Frankie is rattled when the beach house is robbed, much to the annoyance of Grace, who is harbouring a secret that could jeopardise the women's friendship. Sol feels excluded when Robert starts spending more time with his theatre friends so they host an awkward night of drinks at their house.
31	5	"The Gun"	Rebecca Asher	Julie Durk	March 24, 2017
Frankie is outraged when she learns Grace owns a gun and demands it be removed, but Grace refuses, setting off a massive fight between the two women. Robert considers coming out to his estranged mother. Mallory and Brianna go out clubbing, where Brianna meets a handsome escort called Ryan, and Grace discovers the truth about the source of their business venture.
32	6	"The Pot"	Andy Ackerman	Julieanne Smolinski	March 24, 2017
Grace rages on Brianna and Frankie for providing the business loan behind her back. Frankie refuses to go home until Grace gives up the gun, instead crashing an intimate night between Bud and Allison. Robert is haunted by his mother after his troubling visit with her. Grace and Frankie's children desperately try to patch things up between their mothers, and ultimately, Grace agrees to give up her gun for Frankie.
33	7	"The Floor"	Rebecca Asher	Alexa Junge	March 24, 2017
Coyote informs Bud that he is looking for a place of his own. Ahead of an important business meeting, Grace and Frankie injure their backs and wind up stuck on the floor. Robert opens up about the troubling vision of his mother with Sol and his friend John.
34	8	"The Alert"	Melanie Mayron	John Hoffman	March 24, 2017
Grace and Frankie are excited about the website launch for their new product but their joy is short-lived when Bud comes around with questionable gifts. Grace and Frankie conduct a business meeting with one of Grace's longtime friends but, ultimately, realise they can’t knowingly erase the very woman they created the product for with their heavily edited potential packaging. Brianna and Mallory have dinner out, where Brianna discovers more about her escort, Ryan's, personal life. Sol is shocked when he finds out Bud is planning on firing Joan-Margret, Sol's old secretary, but eventually realises that retirement might be what is needed to move forward.
35	9	"The Apology"	Ken Whittingham	Alex Kavallierou & Sara Lohman	March 24, 2017
Grace and Sol support Robert when his mother dies. Frankie decides to cook dinner for Jacob, but is surprised when he announces plans to move to Santa Fe. Mallory faces tribulations with Mitch and confides in Brianna.
36	10	"The Labels"	Arlene Sanford	Alex Burnett & Brooke Wied	March 24, 2017
Coyote celebrates his sobriety birthday. Bud is thrown for a loop by Allison's interest in Grace and Frankie's new product. Robert and Sol are dragged into helping their ex-wives with orders when the business takes off. The women discover a possible competitor in the market and Frankie is conflicted between moving to Santa Fe with Jacob or staying with Grace and her family.
37	11	"The Other Vibrator"	Rebecca Asher	Billy Finnegan	March 24, 2017
Grace is upset when Frankie tells her about Santa Fe but refuses to tell her friend what to do. Sol encounters homophobic protesters outside the theatre where Robert is performing, but the latter urges his husband to leave them be. Grace and Frankie meet with Nick Skolka, a business competitor who is trying to rip off their product and who instantly is attracted to Grace. Frankie accuses Grace of moving on without her, but suddenly, Frankie experiences a stroke and a frightened Grace calls for help.
38	12	"The Musical"	Arlene Sanford	Wil Calhoun	March 24, 2017
Opening night has arrived for Robert's theatre performance, but the protestors make their way inside to disrupt the show. Frankie's medical episode causes her family to leave during the show. Frankie eventually goes to the hospital where she learns her diagnosis. Allison reveals she is pregnant with Bud’s baby.
39	13	"The Sign"	Rebecca Asher	Marta Kauffman & Howard J. Morris	March 24, 2017
Grace shares her concerns to Frankie about her health. Grace receives news that she is being served from her competitor, but she finds an ulterior motive behind the papers. Robert and Sol have conflicting ideas about handling anti-LGBT protestors. Brianna travels to Baltimore to win back her ex Barry. Frankie makes a decision about moving to Santa Fe with Jacob. Mallory announces her separation from Mitch.

=== Season 4 (2018) ===
No. overall	No. in season	Title	Directed by	Written by	Original release date
40	1	"The Lodger"	Alex Hardcastle	Marta Kauffman & Howard J. Morris	January 19, 2018
Frankie returns from Santa Fe to find Grace lodging with perky manicurist Sheree (Lisa Kudrow). Sol is upset when Robert wants to stop attending rallies for gay rights with him, due to feeling his age.
41	2	"The Scavengender Hunt"	Ken Whittingham	Marta Kauffman & Howard J. Morris	January 19, 2018
Frankie admits how unhappy she is in Santa Fe, as her obvious jealousy towards Sheree concerns Grace. A "scavengender" hunt to discover the sex of Bud and Allison's baby goes awry, as everyone's issues come to light at the party. Barry accepts a job offer from Brianna's rival, Lauren, and Mallory becomes upset when she realises Mitch is meeting new women. Jacob, although unhappy, is understanding about Frankie's feelings about Santa Fe and the latter apologies to Sheree for her hostile behaviour.
42	3	"The Tappys"	Rebecca Asher	Billy Finnegan	January 19, 2018
Grace and Frankie break into Sheree's former home to help prove her claim of ownership (instead of her step-children). Sol encourages Robert to use an award acceptance speech as a platform for activism, but is ultimately upset when Robert neglects to thank him. Brianna uses a spy camera in order to ensure that Barry is taking care of her dog properly. Bud reveals he and Allison are expecting a girl.
43	4	"The Expiration Date"	Alex Hardcastle	John Hoffman	January 19, 2018
Grace struggles to keep up her “younger woman” façade with Nick and expects the relationship to end when Nick gets bored. Frankie is shocked to learn that she has been declared legally dead. Sol realizes it may be time to hang up his protest sign as well.
44	5	"The Pop-Ups"	Rebecca Asher	Julia Durk	January 19, 2018
Declared legally dead, Frankie begins to reflect about where her life has taken her and the choices she made, leading her to attempt a reconnection with her estranged older sister, Teddie. Grace continues to worry about how her age might affect her relationship with Nick, with surprising results. When Sol and Robert meet their eccentric next-door neighbors, they disagree about the best course of action. Bud proposes, but when Allison declares that she wants a prenup, he seeks advice from his family.
45	6	"The Hinge"	Ken Whittingham	Julieanne Smolinski	January 19, 2018
Despite problems with her knee, Grace refuses to slow down and, after an embarrassing situation at a hardware store involving a police car and a scooter cart, she comes clean to Barry. Robert buys Sol a trip on a folk music cruise as an apology present and tells him he will quit the theatre group, but events drag him back in, causing a rift between the two. Bud arranges for Allison and Coyote to spend time together in the hope that they will learn to like each other. Frankie and Teddie eventually make amends.
46	7	"The Landline"	Randall Keenan Winston	Michael Platt & Barry Safchik	January 19, 2018
Sol and Frankie go on an adventure as they attempt to get Frankie “alive” again. Grace faces some realities about herself and her life after attending a friend's funeral with Robert. Nick wants to attend, but Grace is embarrassed about him being younger and tells him not to come. Tensions are high between Robert and Sol after Robert accepted the lead role in Peter’s play, leading Sol to go on the cruise without him. Mallory interviews at Say Grace but is angry when Brianna rejects her, leading to the latter admitting the company has had a poor year, being outperformed by Lauren’s company.
47	8	"The Lockdown"	Gail Lerner	David Budin & Brendan McCarthy	January 19, 2018
After multiple false alarms, Allison decides to have a home birth and wants Frankie to deliver the baby, to Bud's horror. Robert and Sol agree to let Grace stay with them while she recovers from knee surgery. Secrets and arguments unfold when the four, along with Robert and Sol’s neighbours who have a bone to pick with the boys, are forced into lockdown when an orangutan escapes from a local zoo. Thankfully, Frankie and Sol make it for the birth and Frankie helps Allison give birth to a healthy baby girl.
48	9	"The Knee"	Rebecca Asher	Gretchen Enders	January 19, 2018
Nick is desperate to help Grace following her knee surgery and show her his ability to care for people in need. Frankie is enjoying her new role as a grandmother, but Jacob is feeling tired of coming in second in her life and ultimately decides they should break up. Frankie inadvertently names Bud and Allison’s baby “Faith”.
49	10	"The Death Stick"	Ken Whittingham	Brooke Wied	January 19, 2018
Grace and Frankie take gifts to Harriet, their most prominent customer, only to discover that she has died while using their vibrator. While Grace tries to do damage control to make sure their product survives, Frankie is riddled with guilt. Robert and Sol go to couple's therapy following the introduction of Roy, a handsome friend Sol met on the folk cruise and whom Robert is immediately jealous of. Lauren offers to buy Brianna's company, revealing Brianna's company's money troubles to Barry. Grace and Frankie ultimately find out their product did not kill Harriet, but instead brought her out of her shell following her husband’s death and sales boost. Suddenly, disaster strikes as their bathroom tub falls through the floor into the kitchen.
50	11	"The Tub"	Rebecca Asher	Alex Burnett	January 19, 2018
Grace hires a contractor to fix the house after their bathtub fell into their kitchen, but that turns out to be a scam and their house is ransacked while she is away. Frankie gets lost driving with Faith and winds up in Mexico with no credit card and a dead phone, angering Bud. Brianna reveals to Grace that her company is in trouble due to her latest product failure and people no longer buying the original line. Robert and Sol navigate how to deal with Roy, as both can’t help but be flattered when he flirts with them.
51	12	"The Rats"	Alan Poul	Sara Lohman & Alex Kavallierou	January 19, 2018
Grace and Frankie go to great lengths to hide from their families that their house was ransacked and that Grace's other knee is now hurt as well, fearing that their children will think of them as invalids. It’s the opening night of Robert’s play and Sol feels muscled out when Roy surprisingly turns up. The children finally find out the extent of the problems at the beach house.
52	13	"The Home"	Marta Kauffman	Melissa DiNicola & Billy Finnegan	January 19, 2018
Grace and Frankie are manipulated into living in a retirement home by their children, with Bud and Coyote convincing Grace to go for Frankie's sake, while Brianna and Mallory do the same to Frankie. Living in the home presents a number of limitations neither Grace nor Frankie are happy or comfortable with, including no painting in the bedrooms and no running their business. Grace breaks up with Nick, feeling too old for him. Robert and Sol offend Roy when he realises they’ve been using him, but the three quickly patch things up again. Realising their deception, Grace and Frankie stage an escape mission from the retirement home with their confiscated items and a toaster to find that their house has been sold while they were away.

=== Season 5 (2019) ===
No. overall	No. in season	Title	Directed by	Written by	Original release date
53	1	"The House"	Michael Showalter	Marta Kauffman & Howard J. Morris	January 18, 2019
Grace and Frankie hide out at the empty beach house and try to figure out what to do, while their worried children try to track them down. Sol and Robert are caught in an embarrassing situation with Roy.
54	2	"The Squat"	Ken Whittingham	Billy Finnegan	January 18, 2019
Grace and Frankie squat in their old house and deal with the new owner, a young celebrity named Kareena G who is hiding out from the fallout of a social media disaster. Robert and Sol must deal with Peter, Robert's high maintenance theatre friend, when he shows up at their house with his dog, Norman, needing a place to stay. Frankie and Grace convince Kareena G to hide out in Santa Fe instead and they get their house back.
55	3	"The Aide"	Kyra Sedgwick	Barry Safchik & Michael Platt	January 18, 2019
Still irritated and concerned for Frankie and Grace, Bud provides his mother with an ultimatum: if she agrees to get a live-in aide for her and Grace, Bud will let her be alone with Faith again, having prevented this following Frankie's impromptu drive to Mexico with the baby. Grace angrily opposes this, but Frankie finds a loophole and hires Joan-Margaret as their aide. Grace returns to Say Grace after discovering Brianna is having a 'fire-sale', and dumping the original line.
56	4	"The Crosswalk"	John Hoffman	John Hoffman	January 18, 2019
Grace and Brianna clash on her first day back at work. Oliver, Robert and Sol's neighbour, comes out as gay and joins Robert's theatre company. Frankie and Joan-Margaret try to get a crosswalk wait time lengthened as they believe it to be ageist. Oliver's new involvement in the theatre annoys Robert, especially when Peter casts the latter in the lead role instead of Robert.
57	5	"The Pharmacy"	Randall Keenan Winston	Julie Durk	January 18, 2019
A random encounter with a mysterious teenage boy leads to a shocking revelation for Coyote. Frankie tries to do chores with Grace back at work and runs into trouble when she encounters a long line at the pharmacy. Sol, missing Peter's dog, gets one of his own and lies about it being from the pound.
58	6	"The Retreat"	Rebecca Asher	Julieanne Smolinski	January 18, 2019
Grace and Frankie attend a spiritual retreat that Frankie misrepresents as spa. Coyote realizes that the boy who punched him is his half-brother. Mallory goes on a date with the Jumbotron Guy. Frankie reacquaints with Leo, an old flame from her activist days, who initially rebuffs her.
59	7	"The Tremor"	Ken Whittingham	David Budin & Brendan McCarthy	January 18, 2019
Frankie worries she has lost her authenticity and attempts to regain it with Leo’s help. Meanwhile, Grace worries about Frankie's health. Bud's first meeting with Allison's father does not go exactly as planned.
60	8	"The Ceremony"	Rebecca Asher	Brooke Wied	January 18, 2019
Grace’s distrust towards Leo and dismissive attitude towards a traditional “cacao ceremony” angers Frankie. Robert’s insecurities flare when he tries to fit in with the younger guys at rehearsal, before making a lovely discovery. Brianna is shocked when Barry’s old friends ask for his help in getting them pregnant.
61	9	"The Website"	Silver Tree	Alex Burnett	January 18, 2019
Grace and Frankie are outraged when they find out the domain name for their website has been stolen by Howard, a gruff Walden Villas resident, and they set out to get it back. Sol gets irritated by Robert’s spoiled attitude and becomes more assertive. Mallory must deal with an embarrassing incident at Madison’s school.
62	10	"The Highs"	Ken Whittingham	Alex Kavallierou	January 18, 2019
Frankie tries to start a “National Vibrator Day” as a way to promote the business, but it leads to disaster. When Coyote reveals he wants to start paying his parents back, Frankie and Sol bicker on their different reactions. Brianna decides to pretend her mother is still CEO of Say Grace so as to get on the cover of a magazine, but Grace goes overboard with Adderall pills and ends up insulting her daughters. Frankie and Robert get high together and bond, but Sol is furious when the pair inadvertently lose Carl.
63	11	"The Video"	David Warren	David Budin & Brendan McCarthy	January 18, 2019
Grace tries to clear up Frankie’s business mess but Nick urges her to let Frankie take care of her own problems and go away on vacation with him. Brianna accidentally ruins Barry’s chance at fathering Liz and Erin’s baby during an awkward lunch but promptly fixes her mistake. Robert, unhappy in a secondary role, feels overlooked at the theatre. When Frankie deliberately alters the apology video Grace made on behalf of the company, she finally agrees to go away with Nick and let Frankie deal with the problem herself.
64	12	"The Wedding"	Alex Hardcastle	Ben Siskin & Billy Finnegan	January 18, 2019
Grace and Nick return from their trip to the Maldives rejuvenated, but Grace is alarmed to find that Frankie has pulled everything together and that Vybrant is doing just fine without her. Desperate for something to fix, Grace offers to help Frankie with her chores for Bud and Alison's wedding, but it turns out that there is a method to Frankie's madness there as well. In spite of Grace's meddling, the wedding goes well: Mallory brings a new date, Alison's mother finally stands up for herself, and everyone enjoys Sol's surprise gift for Robert. Grace and Frankie have a fight that might prove the last straw for both of them.
65	13	"The Alternative"	Marta Kauffman	Marta Kauffman & Howard J. Morris	January 18, 2019
In the wake of their fight, Grace and Frankie separately yet simultaneously imagine what their lives would have been like had they not moved in together after the events of three years before. Frankie, having suffered three strokes, would still be living with newlyweds Robert and Sol – who are secretly planning on moving to a new home without her. Grace would be coming to town with her harmless and vacuous second husband Jack Patterson (George Hamilton) after extensive cosmetic facial surgery for Brianna's 40th birthday. After the party completely falls apart, Grace and Frankie argue about a samovar that is now their friend Babe's urn, as well as Grace's inability to go to her funeral because she could not face Robert. The ladies would realize that Babe left the samovar to both of them because she knew how much the two meant to each other. This provides the reality check Grace and Frankie need; they make amends and vow their friendship to each other. Frankie is overjoyed and ready to return to their beach house, but is shocked when Grace reveals that she had married Nick the night before.

=== Season 6 (2020) ===
No. overall	No. in season	Title	Directed by	Written by	Original release date
66	1	"The Newlyweds"	Marta Kauffman	Marta Kauffman & Howard J. Morris	January 15, 2020
Grace is concerned at how Frankie is nonchalant over her news. Brianna is disgusted when Barry tells her of the details of the DIY procedure of trying to get Liz and Erin pregnant. The families convene at Sol and Robert's to celebrate Bud and Allison's wedding. Coyote brings a date with him. Frankie's speech to the happy couple has everybody in shock. Nick comes over, showing a DVD of his nuptials with Grace. Brianna helps Barry streamline his upcoming insemination procedure. Frankie bids goodbye to Grace as she leaves the house to start her married life.
67	2	"The Rescue"	David Warren	David Budin & Brendan McCarthy	January 15, 2020
Joan-Margaret tries to help Frankie get out of her funk over Grace leaving by paying someone for a day to literally clean up her life. Grace's joint pains catch up to her. Sol and Robert discuss prospective ideas for their honeymoon. Brianna volunteers to be part of Barry's insemination procedure. Grace hosts a dinner to meet the rest of Nick's family, especially his son, but is shocked to discover that Nick's current business partner, Miriam, is also his ex-wife. Sol finally takes swimming lessons to prepare for Robert's dream honeymoon. Brianna botches her role in Barry's insemination process, but finds a creative way to resolve it. Grace's joint pain takes an embarrassing turn, so much so that she reaches out to Frankie for help instead of Nick.
68	3	"The Trophy Wife"	Ken Whittingham	Julie Durk	January 15, 2020
Grace pleads to Frankie to join her and Nick at a charity event. Robert and Sol host a celebrity game night with their children where everyone's competitive drive surfaces. Grace is shocked at the age of the other wives she meets at her table. Frankie battles Jack, another donor, for a pair of donated shoes that were worn by Jerry Garcia. Grace makes a faux pas, criticizing the naive dreams of one of the wives she met. Robert and Sol both receive results about their recent visit to the doctor.
69	4	"The Funky Walnut"	John Hoffman	John Hoffman	January 15, 2020
Robert and Sol both brace themselves after the latter is diagnosed with prostate cancer. Coyote visits his mother and meets Bud's ex-girlfriend, Jessica, ultimately spending time with her. Grace is pitched a solution for her recent troubles by an inventive Frankie. Robert and Sol disagree on how Sol should live life with his health issue.
70	5	"The Confessions"	Betty Thomas	Julieanne Smolinski	January 15, 2020
Grace has an issue with Nick's yawning. Robert urges Sol to tell his family about his upcoming treatment. Brianna and Mallory try to discover who is planning to leave Say Grace after finding a job application cover letter. Robert and Sol host a cheese fondue dinner party as a setup for Coyote and Allison's friend. Robert lets slips Sol's condition to Frankie, who promptly crashes the dinner party to instill healing. Bud is upset when Coyote reveals he is dating Jessica.
71	6	"The Bad Hearer"	Marta Cunningham	Alex Burnett	January 15, 2020
Frankie tells Grace and Joan-Margaret about her first date with Jack, looking forward to the next one. Sol, fed up with being showered with concern from his sons and Robert, decides to escape to a cancer support group meeting. Brianna and Mallory continue to fight, but Barry wants a truce in order to be able to dine at a restaurant that only accepts two-couple reservations. Grace devises a way to subtly introduce Frankie's latest invention. Both Frankie and Jack have a confession to make prior to their second date.
72	7	"The Surprises"	Ken Whittingham	Barry Safchik & Michael Platt	January 15, 2020
Frankie, along with Grace, goes over to support Sol after his surgery, even inviting Jack to meet him. Robert and Sol are mortified when they realize who Jack is after Frankie reveals more about him. Brianna gives her OK to Barry about being a guardian to Liz and Erin's unborn child but soon regrets it after knowing more about their lifestyles. Allison challenges Bud about whether he is over Jessica, so much so that they visit her and Coyote, only to find out Bud's memories of his night with Jessica were factually incorrect. Frankie confides to Grace that she is saddened by how much they all hurt Jack but is surprised by an unexpected visit.
73	8	"The Short Rib"	Marta Kauffman	Brooke Wied	January 15, 2020
Grace realizes she forgot Nick's romantic getaway plans to Hawaii, which now conflicts with Frankie's birthday celebrations. Grace suggests a dinner with Frankie and Jack for Nick to get to know them better, maybe even inviting them to Hawaii to join them. Robert and Sol are invited to a funeral for one of Robert's fellow sailors when he was in the Navy, but Robert cannot honestly remember him. Barry and Brianna finally go on a double date with Mallory and Dan to dine on short rib, only to have Dan's true colors surface in a most embarrassing way. As Frankie and Jack are both thrilled at the prospect of going to Hawaii, Jacob suddenly comes knocking on Frankie's door.
74	9	"The One-At-A-Timing"	Rebecca Asher	Elena Crevello	January 15, 2020
Frankie chooses to play a dangerous game two-timing between Jack and Jacob. Bud and Allison wonder about Faith's potential, prompting Allison to steal Bud's DNA behind his back. Grace strikes out to find investors for their toilet, with Frankie suggesting they try out for Shark Tank. Sol and Allison come clean to Bud after their curiosity goes too far. Grace gives in to trying out for Shark Tank as a way to cheer up Frankie.
75	10	"The Scent"	Ken Whittingham	David Budin & Brendan McCarthy	January 15, 2020
Grace and Frankie both decide they need time apart from each other after going through a botched audition for Shark Tank. Frankie comes home to Joan-Margaret, who tells her her visa is about to expire unless she can find an American citizen to marry. Grace gets a massage with Brianna and Mallory, but finds the scent the masseurs are using has been stolen from a Say Grace proprietary scent by a company called Trust Us. Robert and Sol host a fundraiser for their community theater at their home, with Robert making a most generous donation behind Sol's back. Frankie sets up Joan-Margaret for speed dating at a retirement home. Grace gets to the root of the scent theft, but then has to avoid a lawsuit with Trust Us. Brianna makes a decision about the future of Say Grace.
76	11	"The Laughing Stock"	Alex Hardcastle	Alex Levy & Ben Siskin	January 15, 2020
While discussing their strategy for their upcoming Shark Tank appearance, Grace and Frankie realize they have misplaced something important. Under the new ownership of Say Grace, Brianna and Barry must make their relationship official. Unbeknownst to Sol, Robert tries to recoup the funds he donated by becoming a Lyft driver. Coyote and Jessica have brunch at Sol and Robert's to discuss the future of their relationship. Grace and Frankie locate their missing item, but are then confronted by the police for theft. Brianna is offered a huge career opportunity, and accepts the job, but Barry surprises her with his reaction.
77	12	"The Tank"	Rebecca Asher	Alex Kavallierou	January 15, 2020
As Grace and Frankie finalize their preparations for appearing on Shark Tank, Nick reveals to Grace his bad history with Mark Cuban. Sol is excited about finally going on a honeymoon cruise with Robert, but Robert still has not been able to replace the missing funds although Peter has an idea of having Robert sell one of their valuable assets. Bud and Coyote meet up with Bud's biological cousin, who admits his motivation for being on a DNA family history website. The ladies finally make their Shark Tank appearance, prompting Grace to make an unprecedented move, at the cost of her friendship with Frankie.
78	13	"The Change"	Marta Kauffman	Marta Kauffman & Howard J. Morris	January 15, 2020
Joan-Margaret joins Frankie after she repurposes her invention after failing on Shark Tank. Sol makes a revenge purchase after learning Robert sold their afterlife plans. Grace is furious at Nick, after discovering the real reason as to why he despises Mark Cuban. Brianna turns down her job offer in hopes of reconciling with Barry. Grace comes to the rescue of Frankie and Joan-Margaret, but finds her credit cards no longer work. Brianna then comes to rescue the ladies, revealing that her relationship with Barry has evolved. Mallory gives Brianna a big surprise. Nick's past comes back to haunt him, shocking Grace in both a negative and positive way. Grace and Frankie return to the beach house, only to see Robert and Sol waiting for them as they are now homeless, due to Frankie's prototype toilet exploding.

=== Season 7 (2021–22) ===
No. overall	No. in season	Title	Directed by	Written by	Original release date
79	1	"The Roomies"	Marta Kauffman	Marta Kauffman & Howard J. Morris	August 13, 2021
With Robert and Sol now living with them at the beach house and the FBI snooping around, Grace instructs Frankie to find the money she hid away following Nick’s arrest. The only problem is: she can’t remember where she hid it! Brianna tries to get used to the new dynamic at work with Mallory now being her boss.
80	2	"The Arraignment"	Alex Hardcastle	Julie Durk	August 13, 2021
Grace reluctantly appears at Nick's arraignment, which turns into a heated discussion about their status as a married couple. When Robert is pressed for another donation to rescue the snack bar at the theater, Joan-Margaret sees it as a way to help Grace and Frankie launder Nick's money.
81	3	"The Bunny"	Gail Lerner	Barry Safchik & Michael Platt	August 13, 2021
With their parents still bickering as roommates, Bud decides to throw a family brunch as a way to soothe tempers. However, things go awry when long-held secrets are uncovered and the two families learn how each tried to avoid spending time with the other years ago.
82	4	"The Circumcision"	David Warren	Ben Siskin	August 13, 2021
Bud learns a pain he's been feeling can be cured by getting circumcised. Coyote and Jessica become interested in a house that Brianna clues them in on, one Barry liked but she rejected. Grace sees her dynamic with Nick being threatened as he says he has a chance at being released from prison. Frankie discovers an alternate way to launder Nick's cash, but it backfires.
83	5	"The Raccoon"	Betty Thomas	Elena Crevello	April 29, 2022
Grace and Frankie unhappily get a new, ankle-tagged housemate. Robert and Sol join neighborhood watch to decrease their fear after being burgled in their sleep. Brianna unintentionally overshares at a meeting with Barry's wholesome parents.
84	6	"The Wire"	Gail Mancuso	Alex Kavallierou	April 29, 2022
The ladies try to help the FBI catch Nick's partner to reduce his sentence. Sol falsely accuses Peter's new partner of the burglary. Mallory struggles to dominate at work.
85	7	"The Psychic"	Molly McGlynn	Brendan McCarthy	April 29, 2022
Grace and Frankie rush to find their missing friend Arlene so her care center doesn't shift her onto the memory care floor. Nick disrupts Coyote's romantic proposal.
86	8	"The Bonida Bandidas"	Marta Kauffman	David Budin	April 29, 2022
Brianna and Mallory are subjected to a conflict mediator at work, Mallory's ex. After a bit of one-to-one talking of their own accord, Brianna chooses to leave the company. Grace and Frankie try to sneak a copious amount of a controlled substance out of Mexico for Arlene and several others from the assisted living home. However, Frankie inadvertently gets left behind.
87	9	"The Prediction"	Todd Holland	Alex Burnett	April 29, 2022
Grace gets an upsetting call from the psychic who guided them successfully on the drug run. Not only does she clearly guide her to find Frankie in Mexico, but also provides her with Franke's definitive DOD, so she contemplates her future. Sol suspects that Robert is suffering from memory loss, as he sees more and more signs of it.
88	10	"The Panic Attacks"	David Warren	Alex Levy & Pete Swanson	April 29, 2022
Frankie takes Grace to a therapist after a panic attack leads to the emergency room, where it is theorized it was due to the psychic's prediction. Brianna considers her next plan. Coyote runs into problems with his marriage plan as Missy, the gambler he married in Vegas, considers him a lucky charm. He helps her win a random camel race online; however, it doesn't dissuade her. A poker game is meant to prove her wrong, but he finally convinces her, explaining that Jessica is his lucky charm.
89	11	"The Horrible Family"	Kelly Park	Brooke Wied	April 29, 2022
Frankie decides to celebrate every holiday before her August 27th DOD. Grace's family finds a surprising, disgraceful link to an upcoming political figure. At an informal family gathering so Coyote and his family can meet, Bud decides to roast his brother to practice his comic skills, inadvertently uncovering the random gambling over camels which got him money for the honeymoon, and previous wedding in Vegas due to his past drug addiction.
90	12	"The Casino"	Ken Whittingham	Julie Durk & Alex Burnett & Elena Crevello	April 29, 2022
The ladies conceal their identities in order to watch over Coyote, who has gone to a casino, as Frankie fears he may fall off the wagon. Brianna pretends to still be the CEO in order to win over an investor and former schoolmate, which backfires. Frankie feels guilty afterwards for not believing in Coyote, however alcoholic expert Grace knows better, so she and he privately discuss it. Coyote admits he was tempted and heads off to AA.
91	13	"The Last Hurrah"	Molly McGlynn	James Newmyer & Brendan McCarthy	April 29, 2022
Coyote finally confirms that Bud is being dishonest about doing standup rather than going to the gym. Grace pursues Nick about his tell-all novel. Frankie, looking to have sex one last time, calls exes then zones in on Nick's ghostwriter, but changes her mind in the end. Brianna gets Sol to help her apologize to Mallory, using the earpiece he just bought to feed Robert his lines in his final play. Nick explains his one regret is opening up his heart to Grace, as he could never be more important to her than Frankie. However, they have one last tryst, leaving things on a more upbeat note.
92	14	"The Paprikash"	Rebecca Asher	Alex Kavallierou & Brooke Wied & David Budin	April 29, 2022
Grace wants to enjoy comfort food from her childhood, but her estranged brother Jeffrey has the recipe. Calling for the recipe, he shows up before she can stop him. Sol and Peter decide to blackmail Simon, a critic, finally gaining his sympathy and support once Sol reveals Robert is showing signs of dementia. It's revealed that Grace has been avoiding Jeffrey for decades to avoid painful memories of her dad, who they lost young and she'd adored. Brianna and Barry break up as she doesn't like his baby daughter distracting him from her.
93	15	"The Fake Funeral"	Alex Hardcastle	Barry Safchik & Michael Platt	April 29, 2022
Frankie decides to host her own funeral, coinciding with an important meeting with potential Japanese investors, so Grace is forced to attend it alone. Brianna is irritated by her family's support for Barry, only getting Mallory's sympathy once she sees she is hurt. Frustrated that everyone's eulogies include Grace stories, Frankie stomps off frustrated.
94	16	"The Beginning"	Marta Kauffman	Marta Kauffman & Howard J. Morris	April 29, 2022
Robert finally accepts his memory loss. Everyone helps to redo the decor to transform the fake funeral into a fake wedding for Coyote and Jessica to coax Frankie out. Grace and Frankie confront each other and, after their arguing overshadows the wedding, they reconcile only for them both to be knocked out when Grace's martini shorts out the mic. Finding themselves in heaven, they convince the receptionist (Dolly Parton) to send them back. All of the couples, Grace and Frankie, and the sisters go on with their lives.
