= List of awards and nominations received by Penn & Teller: Bullshit! =

Penn & Teller: Bullshit! awards and nominations
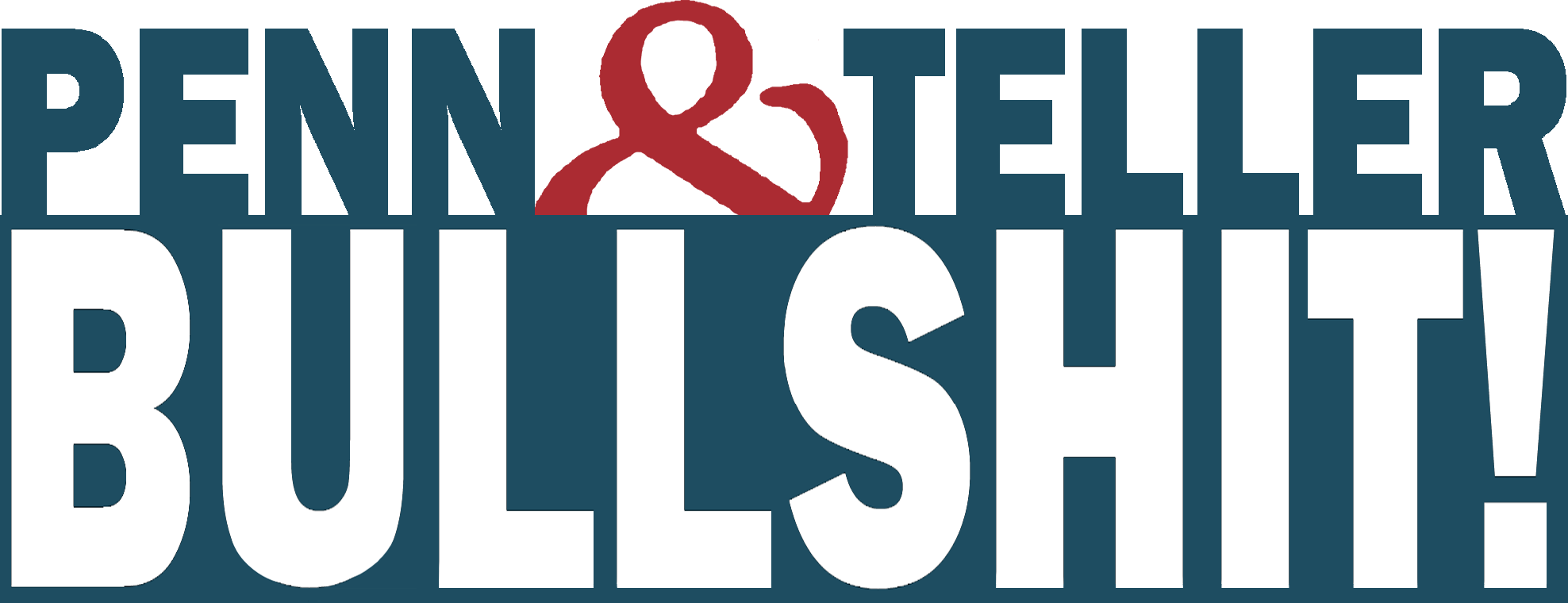
- Text logo for the series
Awards and nominations
Award	Wins	Nominations
Emmy Awards	0	13
Directors Guild of America Award	0	1
Independent Investigations Group Award	1	1
Writers Guild of America Award	1	6

Totals (Note: Certain award groups do not simply award one winner. They acknowledge several different recipients, have runners-up, and have third place. Since this is a specific recognition and is different from losing an award, runner-up mentions are considered wins in this award tally. For simplification and to avoid errors, each award in this list has been presumed to have had a prior nomination.)
- Wins: 2
- Nominations: 21

Penn & Teller: Bullshit! is an American documentary television series that aired for eight seasons from 2003 to 2010 on the premium cable channel Showtime. Penn & Teller: Bullshit! was hosted by professional magicians and skeptics Penn & Teller. Its format consists of debating political topics, often from a naturalist libertarian capitalist point of view (the political philosophy espoused by both Penn and Teller) or aiming to debunk pseudoscientific ideas, paranormal beliefs, popular fads and misconceptions. The hosts examine topics within the analytical structure of science.

The television program has been nominated for 21 awards, winning two. The Writers Guild of America bestowed an award upon the program in 2004 recognizing excellence in its writing quality. It received an award from the Independent Investigations Group in 2008, recognizing the show's contribution to public understanding of scientific skepticism and rational thinking. In addition, over the course of its run Penn & Teller: Bullshit! garnered a Directors Guild of America Award nomination, 13 Primetime Emmy Award nominations, and five Writers Guild of America Award nominations.

== Directors Guild of America Awards ==
The Directors Guild of America Awards are issued annually by the Directors Guild of America. Known as the DGA Awards, the recognition ceremony began in 1948.

List of Directors Guild of America Awards and nominations received by Penn & Teller: Bullshit!
Year	Category	Nominee(s)	Result	Ref
2006	Outstanding Directorial Achievement in Reality Programs	Star Price	Nominated	

== Independent Investigations Group Awards ==
The Independent Investigations Group is an organization dedicated to skepticism, and researching those who argue for the presence of extraordinary phenomena including UFOs, paranormal assertions, ghosts, and psychics. A branch of the Center for Inquiry, the organization began in 2000 and is based in Los Angeles, California.

List of Independent Investigations Group Awards and nominations received by Penn & Teller: Bullshit!
Year	Category	Nominee(s)	Result	Refs
2008	Recognizing "the promotion of Scientific and Critical Thinking in mainstream entertainment"	Penn & Teller	Won	

== Primetime Emmy Awards ==
The Primetime Emmy Award is an American accolade bestowed by the Academy of Television Arts & Sciences in recognition of excellence in American primetime television programming.

List of Primetime Emmy Awards and nominations received by Penn & Teller: Bullshit!
Year	Category	Nominee(s)	Result	Ref(s)
2003	Outstanding Main Title Design	Justin Leibow and Kyle Hollingsworth	Nominated	
2003	Outstanding Main Title Theme Music	Gary Stockdale	Nominated	,
2004	Outstanding Reality Program	Mark Wolper, Star Price, Penn Jillette, Teller, Peter Adam Golden, Michael Goudeau, and Shari Adagio	Nominated	
2004	Outstanding Writing for Nonfiction Programming	Penn Jillette, Teller, Emma Webster, Star Price, and Michael Goudeau	Nominated	
2005	Outstanding Reality Program	Mark Wolper, Star Price, Penn Jillette, Teller, Michael Goudeau, Tim Rogan, Peter Adam Golden, Krasher Lewis, Shari Adagio, Jon Hotchkiss, Joshua E. Kessler, Patti Duce, Renee Y. Henson, Tammie Smalls, June Molgaard, Aaron Yampolski, and Randall Kirk	Nominated	
2005	Outstanding Writing for Nonfiction Programming	Penn Jillette, Teller, Jon Hotchkiss, Star Price, and Michael Goudeau	Nominated	
2006	Outstanding Picture Editing for Nonfiction Programming	Steven Uhlenberg	Nominated	
2006	Outstanding Reality Program	Mark Wolper, Star Price, Penn Jillette, Teller, Michael Goudeau, Jon Hotchkiss, and Tim Rogan	Nominated	
2006	Outstanding Writing for Nonfiction Programming	Penn Jillette, Teller, Cliff Schoenberg, Jon Hotchkiss, Michael Goudeau, and Star Price	Nominated	
2007	Outstanding Reality Program	Mark Wolper, Star Price, Penn Jillette, Teller, Tim Rogan, Peter Adam Golden, Krasher Lewis, Michael Goudeau, Jon Hotchkiss, Steven Uhlenberg, Patti Duce, Joshua E. Kessler, and Shari Adagio	Nominated	
2007	Outstanding Writing for Nonfiction Programming	Penn Jillette, Teller, Sheryl Zohn, Jon Hotchkiss, Michael Goudeau, Star Price, Cliff Schoenberg, and David Weiss	Nominated	
2009	Outstanding Picture Editing for Reality Programming	Steven Uhlenberg, Ian Sears, Brian Horn, Richard Erbeznik, and Tim Sullivan	Nominated	
2009	Outstanding Writing for Nonfiction Programming	Penn Jillette, Teller, Star Price, Rich Nathanson, Michael Goudeau, David Wechter, Cliff Schoenberg, and Sheryl Zohn	Nominated	

== Writers Guild of America Awards ==
The Writers Guild of America Awards for outstanding achievements in film, television, and radio have been presented annually by the Writers Guild of America, East and Writers Guild of America, West since 1949.

List of Writers Guild of America Awards and nominations received by Penn & Teller: Bullshit!
Year	Category	Nominee(s)	Result	Ref(s)
2004	Best Comedy/Variety TV Series	Penn Jillette, Teller, David Wechter, and John McLaughlin	Won	
2005	Best Comedy/Variety TV Series	Penn Jillette, Teller, Star Price, John McLaughlin, Jon Hotchkiss, Emma Webster, David Wechter, Jonathan B. Taylor, and Michael Goudeau	Nominated	
2006	Best Comedy/Variety TV Series	Penn Jillette, Teller, Star Price, Jon Hotchkiss, Michael Goudeau, Sheryl Zohn, and Steven Bortko	Nominated	
2007	Best Comedy/Variety TV Series	Penn Jillette, Teller, Jon Hotchkiss, Michael Goudeau, Star Price, Cliff Schoenberg, Sheryl Zohn, and Steve Melcher	Nominated	
2008	Best Comedy/Variety TV Series	Penn Jillette, Teller, David Weiss, Jon Hotchkiss, Michael Goudeau, Star Price, Sheryl Zohn, and Cliff Schoenberg	Nominated	
2011	Best Comedy/Variety TV Series	Penn Jillette, Teller, David Wechter, Michael Goudeau, Steve Melcher, Tom Kramer, and Rich Nathanson	Nominated	

== BMI Cable Award ==
Theme music, Composer: Gary Stockdale.

== See also ==
- List of books about skepticism
- List of fallacies
- List of Penn & Teller: Bullshit! episodes
- List of skeptics and skeptical organizations
- The Skeptic Encyclopedia of Pseudoscience
