= Meg Jackson =

Meg Jackson may refer to:

- Meg Jackson (Prisoner), a character in the Australian TV series Prisoner
- Meg Jackson (Wentworth), a character in the Australian TV series Wentworth
- Meg Jackson (screenwriter), American screenwriter
