= High Desert (TV series) =

2023 television series

- Promotional poster
- Genre: Comedy
- Created by: Nancy Fichman; Katie Ford; Jennifer Hoppe-House
- Written by: Nancy Fichman; Katie Ford; Jennifer Hoppe-House
- Directed by: Jay Roach
- Starring: Patricia Arquette; Brad Garrett; Weruche Opia; Bernadette Peters; Rupert Friend
- Theme music composer: Jeff Russo
- Opening theme: "Talkin' to Myself" by Sarah Shook & The Disarmers
- Country of origin: United States
- Original language: English
- No. of seasons: 1
- No. of episodes: 8

Production
- Executive producers: Patricia Arquette; John Cameron; Jackie Cohn; Nancy Fichman; Katie Ford; Michelle Graham; Jennifer Hoppe-House; Tom Lassally; Molly Madden; Jay Roach; Ben Stiller; Nicky Weinstock
- Running time: 30 minutes
- Production companies: Red Hour Films; Delirious Media; Radish Pictures; Ook Pik Productions; Spoon Productions; 3 Arts Entertainment; My Fist Productions; Apple Studios

Original release
- Network: Apple TV+
- Release: May 17 – June 21, 2023

High Desert is an American comedy television series created and written by Nancy Fichman, Katie Ford and Jennifer Hoppe-House that premiered on Apple TV+ on May 17, 2023. In July 2023, the series was cancelled after one season.

== Premise ==
The series follows Peggy (Patricia Arquette), an addict, who decides to make a fresh start after the death of her beloved mother with whom she lived in the small desert town of Yucca Valley, California. She makes a life-changing decision to become a private investigator.

== Cast ==
=== Main ===
- Patricia Arquette as Peggy Newman
- Harlow Jane as Young Peggy
- Brad Garrett as Bruce Harvey
- Weruche Opia as Carol
- Bernadette Peters as Roslyn / Ginger
- Rupert Friend as Guru Bob

=== Recurring ===
- Crystal Coney as Mary
- Matt Dillon as Denny
- Christine Taylor as Dianne
- Eric Petersen as Owen
- Susan Park as Tammy
- Jeffrey Vincent Parise as Roger
- Eden Brolin as Jeannie
- Carmine Giovinazzo as Nick Gatchi
- Carlo Rota as Arman
- Alex Saxon as Ethan
- Kellen Joseph as William

=== Guest ===
- Keir O'Donnell as Stewart
- Tracy Vilar as Tina
- Jeff Kober as Jimmy Kachel
- Ursula Burton Nurse Erin
- Michael Masini as Leo Gatchi
- Roslyn Gentle as Grounded Lady
- Sara Lindsey as Mandy
- Melissa Bickerton as Becky

== Episodes ==
No.	Title	Directed by	Written by	Original release date
1	"Pain Management"	Jay Roach	Story by : Nancy Fichman & Katie Ford & Jennifer Hoppe; Teleplay by : Nancy Fichman & Katie Ford	May 17, 2023
2	"Two Knockers and No Boyfriend = A Felony"	Jay Roach	Nancy Fichman & Katie Ford & Jennifer Hoppe	May 17, 2023
3	"I'm Getting Close to This Guru Bastard"	Jay Roach	Jennifer Hoppe	May 17, 2023
4	"Get Judy off the Bed"	Jay Roach	Nancy Fichman & Katie Ford & Jennifer Hoppe	May 24, 2023
5	"Soul Retrieval"	Jay Roach	Nancy Fichman & Katie Ford & Jennifer Hoppe	May 31, 2023
6	"A Nod Is Not a Hello"	Jay Roach	Nancy Fichman & Katie Ford & Jennifer Hoppe	June 7, 2023
7	"This Doesn't Have to Be a Tragedy"	Jay Roach	Nancy Fichman & Katie Ford & Jennifer Hoppe	June 14, 2023
8	"I Need a Hero"	Jay Roach	Nancy Fichman & Katie Ford & Jennifer Hoppe	June 21, 2023

== Production ==
=== Development ===
The series, created by Nancy Fichman, Katie Ford and Jennifer Hoppe-House, was given a greenlight in September 2020 by Apple TV+, with Patricia Arquette set to star in the series as well as executive produce along with Ben Stiller, who was set to direct the first episode.

=== Casting ===
In November 2021, Matt Dillon, Rupert Friend, Weruche Opia and Brad Garrett were added to the main cast of the series, with Bernadette Peters and Christine Taylor cast in recurring roles. Stiller would no longer be directing the first episode, as Jay Roach had joined the series to direct all eight episodes.

=== Filming ===
Filming began by November 2021 in Long Beach, California. The show depicts a fictionalized Pioneertown, California shot on set with outdoor footage taken at Sable Ranch, as the actual town is an unincorporated landmark with separate private owners.

== Release ==
High Desert premiered on May 17, 2023, with the first three episodes available immediately and the rest debuting on a weekly basis.

== Reception ==
=== Critical response ===
The review aggregator website Rotten Tomatoes reports a 69% approval rating with an average rating of 5.90/10, based on 29 critic reviews. The website's critics consensus reads, "High Desert is so deliberately odd and scattershot that viewers may begin to suspect they're being bamboozled, but Patricia Arquette's whirlwind performance will be enough for many to just sit back and enjoy the ride." Metacritic gave the series a weighted average score of 67 out of 100 based on 17 critic reviews, indicating "generally favorable" reviews.
