= Jennifer Hoppe =

American film and television writer

- Occupations: Screenwriter; Television writer Television producer
- Writing career
- Pen name: Jennifer Hoppe
- Notable works: Nurse Jackie; Damages; Grace and Frankie

Jennifer Hoppe (also credited as Jennifer Hoppe-House) is an American film and television writer, having worked on the series Grace and Frankie, Get Shorty, Nurse Jackie and Damages. She also co-wrote the 2004 made-for-television movie The Dead Will Tell. She often works with her creative partner Nancy Fichman.

== Career ==
=== Film ===
As creative partners, Fichman and Hoppe have sold and developed several feature film projects, including scripts for Mike Figgis, Allen Coulter, Michael Costigan, and Damon Santostefano.

=== Television ===
Along with Katie Ford and Nancy Fichman, Jennifer Hoppe created the series High Desert for Apple+ TV, starring Patricia Arquette.

Fichman and Hoppe have written the following television episodes.

==== Episodes of Nurse Jackie ====
- Steak Knife (2009)
- Bleeding (2010)

==== Episodes of Damages ====
- I've Done Way Too Much for This Girl (2011)
- We'll Just Have to Find Another Way to Cut the Balls Off of This Thing (2011)

==== Episodes of Save Me ====
- Whatever the Weather (2013)

==== Episodes of Grace and Frankie ====
- Episode #1.11 (2015)
- The Dinner (2015)

As a writing team, Fichman and Hoppe have sold pilots to HBO and TNT, and have developed with Lifetime, WE, Warner Brothers TV, and Sony Television.

=== Theater ===
Jennifer Hoppe's play BAD DOG enjoyed a National New Play Network (NNPN) Rolling World Premiere in 2015 at the Orlando Shakespeare Theater and the Olney Theatre Center in Olney, Maryland. Hoppe's BAD DOG was nominated for five Helen Hayes Awards, including Outstanding Play, as well as a nomination for playwriting for the Steinberg Award.

== Awards and nominations ==
In 2009 and 2010, Fichman and Hoppe were nominated for a Writers Guild of America award. Both nominations were for their work on Nurse Jackie.
