= Nancy Fichman =

American television and film writer

- Occupations: Screenwriter; Television writer
- Writing career
- Notable works: Nurse Jackie; Damages

Nancy Fichman is an American film and television writer, having worked on series such as Nurse Jackie, Get Shorty, Grace and Frankie, and Damages. She also wrote the 2004 made-for-television movie The Dead Will Tell starring Anne Heche and Eva Longoria. She often works with her creative partner Jennifer Hoppe-House. The pair, together with Katie Ford, have a new show called High Desert, starring Patricia Arquette, premiering on Apple TV+ on May 17, 2023.

== Awards and nominations ==
In 2009 and 2010, Fichman and Hoppe-House were nomination for a Writers Guild of America award. Both nominations were for their work on Nurse Jackie.
