= Katie Ford (screenwriter) =

Canadian-American screenwriter

Katie Ford is a Canadian-American film and television writer. She was born in New York City, but spent much of her childhood living in Toronto, Ontario, Canada. Her aunt was actress Constance Ford.

Her credits include the film Miss Congeniality, the television movies Lucy and Prayers for Bobby, and the television series Little House on the Prairie, Family Ties, Material World, Rugrats, Desperate Housewives, Working the Engels, Michael: Tuesdays and Thursdays and High Desert.

She is an out lesbian.
