= Steve Melcher =

American screenwriter

Steve "Melch" Melcher is an American comedian, television writer, and creator of the syndicated panel That Is Priceless which provides humorous titles for famed paintings.
