= Grace and Frankie =

American comedy television series (2015–2022)

- Genre: Comedy
- Created by: Marta Kauffman; Howard J. Morris
- Starring: Jane Fonda; Lily Tomlin; Sam Waterston; Martin Sheen; Brooklyn Decker; Ethan Embry; June Diane Raphael; Baron Vaughn; Peter Gallagher
- Opening theme: "Stuck in the Middle with You" performed by Grace Potter
- Composers: Sam KS; Michael Skloff
- Country of origin: United States
- Original language: English
- No. of seasons: 7
- No. of episodes: 94 (list of episodes)

Production
- Executive producers: Marta Kauffman; Howard J. Morris; Jane Fonda; Lily Tomlin; Tate Taylor (pilot); Paula Weinstein; Dana Goldberg; David Ellison; Marcy Ross; Alexa Junge
- Production locations: Los Angeles, California
- Cinematography: Gale Tattersall
- Editors: Lisa Zeno Churgin; Michael Jablow; Sarah Lucky
- Camera setup: Single-camera
- Running time: 25–35 minutes
- Production companies: Okay Goodnight; Skydance Television; Netflix Originals

Original release
- Network: Netflix
- Release: May 8, 2015 – April 29, 2022

Grace and Frankie is an American comedy television series created by Marta Kauffman and Howard J. Morris for Netflix. The series stars Jane Fonda and Lily Tomlin as Grace Hanson and Frankie Bergstein, two aging women who form an unlikely friendship after their husbands reveal they are in love with each other and plan to get married. Sam Waterston, Martin Sheen, Brooklyn Decker, Ethan Embry, June Diane Raphael, and Baron Vaughn co-star in supporting roles.

The series premiered on Netflix on May 8, 2015. The second through sixth seasons were released from 2016 to 2020. The seventh and final season premiered on August 13, 2021 with four episodes, and the final twelve were released on April 29, 2022.

Grace and Frankie received mixed reviews upon its debut, but its second and subsequent seasons were met with a largely positive reception from television critics. It received several accolades, including nominations for 13 Primetime Emmy Awards, with Fonda and Tomlin receiving nominations for Outstanding Lead Actress in a Comedy Series and the series' costuming and production design also garnering multiple nominations. The two leads also earned nominations for the Screen Actors Guild Award for Outstanding Performance by a Female Actor in a Comedy Series with Tomlin also nominated for Best Actress in a Television Series – Musical or Comedy at the 73rd Golden Globes.

== Premise ==
The series follows Grace Hanson, a sharp-tongued, retired cosmetics mogul, and Frankie Bergstein, a quirky artist and hippie, whose long-term husbands, Robert and Sol, are successful divorce lawyers in San Diego, California. Grace and Frankie's lives are turned upside down when Robert and Sol announce they are in love with each other and are leaving their wives. Now the women, who have never particularly liked each other, are forced to live together as they navigate family drama, medical scares, business ventures, and romantic turmoil on their road to becoming best friends.

== Cast and characters ==
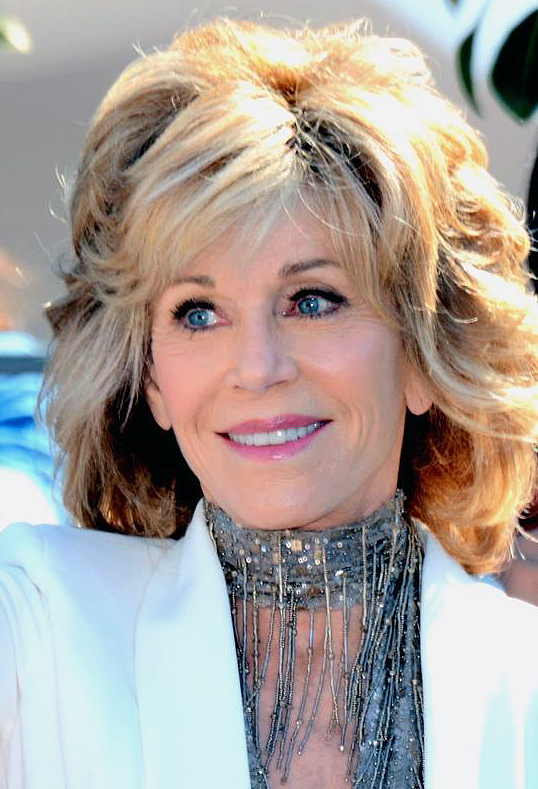
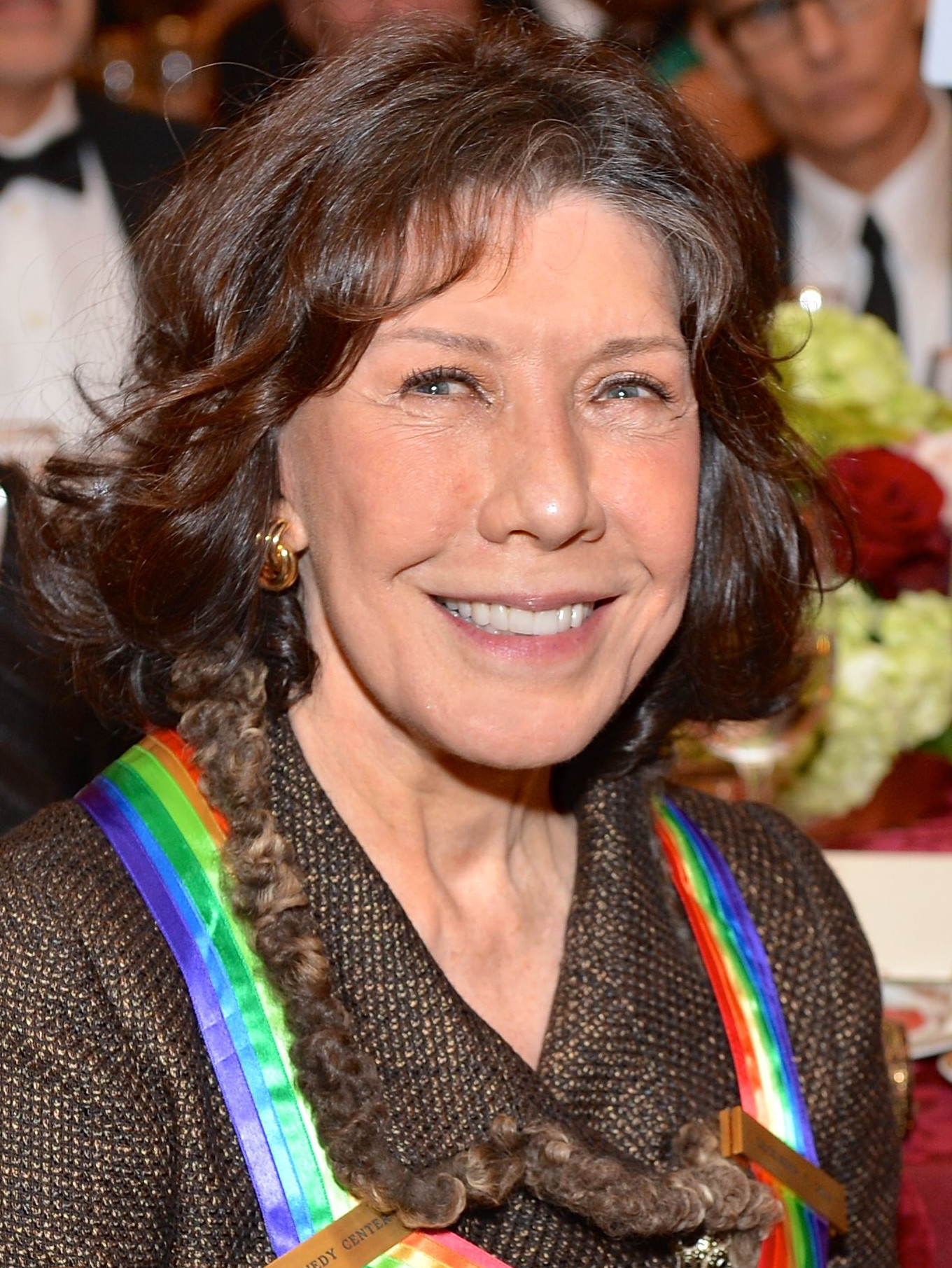
The lead characters are played by Jane Fonda (as Grace) and Lily Tomlin (as Frankie).

=== Main ===
- Jane Fonda as Grace Hanson (née Purcell), a no-nonsense cosmetics mogul who enjoys a martini and often peppers her conversations with clever comments and insults. After years of conflict, she and Frankie call a truce; their relationship evolves and they become best friends. Grace is also mother to Brianna and Mallory, grandmother to Madison, Macklin and the twins, ex-wife of Robert and later, of Nick.
- Lily Tomlin as Frances "Frankie" Bergstein (née Mengela), a quirky artist who "rides her own wave" and often finds herself in situations that require Grace to rescue her. Creative and spiritual, Frankie cares very deeply about her loved ones and would do anything to protect them. She is Grace's best friend, Bud & Coyote's adoptive mother, Faith's grandmother, Allison's mother-in-law and Sol's ex-wife.
- Sam Waterston as Sol Bergstein, a gentle ex-divorce lawyer turned activist for gay rights. Sol was married to Frankie for 40 years, but for much of his marriage, he was in love with Robert, and they ultimately came out to their wives. Sol is also Robert's husband, Bud and Coyote's adoptive father, stepfather to Brianna and Mallory, Faith's grandfather, Allison's father-in-law and Frankie's ex-husband.
- Martin Sheen as Robert Hanson, a successful divorce lawyer who threw himself into theatre following retirement. He was married to Grace for 40 years, and they had two daughters, Brianna and Mallory. Robert began to fall in love with his law partner Sol, and the feeling was mutual. Robert is Sol's husband, Grace's ex-husband, Brianna and Mallory's father, grandfather to Macklin, Madison and the twins, stepfather to Bud and Coyote, and close friend to Peter.
- June Diane Raphael as Brianna Hanson, the first-born child of Grace and Robert, who is now the CEO of Say Grace, a successful cosmetics company that Grace gave her after retiring. Sharp, impatient, and fiery, Brianna resembles her mother personality-wise more than her sister, Mallory. Bri is also the girlfriend (later fiancée) to Barry, aunt of Mallory's children, archrival of Lauren, and stepdaughter of Nick and Sol.
- Brooklyn Decker as Mallory Hanson, second-born daughter of Grace and Robert, younger sister of Brianna, and mother of Madison, Macklin, and the twins. She is also stepdaughter of Nick and Sol. At the start of the series, she is married to Mitch. In season 3 the two divorce.
- Ethan Embry as Coyote Bergstein, first-born adoptive child of Frankie and Sol, older brother of Bud, uncle of Faith, and husband of Jessica. Coyote is a recovering addict and is a middle school music teacher.
- Baron Vaughn as Nwabudike "Bud" Bergstein, second-born adoptive child of Frankie and Sol, younger brother of Coyote, father of Faith, and Allison's husband. Bud is a lawyer, and, similar to Brianna, now runs the law firm left to him by his father, Sol, after the latter retired.

=== Recurring ===
Actor	Character	Season						
Actor	Character	1	2	3	4	5	6	7
Peter Cambor	Barry	Recurring	Guest	Recurring	Recurring	Recurring	Recurring	Recurring
Craig T. Nelson	Guy	Recurring						
Ernie Hudson	Jacob	Recurring	Recurring	Recurring	Recurring		Recurring	
Geoff Stults	Mitch	Recurring		Guest				
Tim Bagley	Peter	Recurring	Guest	Recurring	Recurring	Recurring	Recurring	Recurring
Michael Charles Roman	Adam	Guest	Recurring	Guest	Recurring	Recurring	Recurring	Recurring
Brittany Ishibashi	Erica	Guest	Recurring		Guest		Guest	Recurring
Estelle Parsons	Babe		Recurring			Guest		
Sam Elliott	Phil Milstein		Recurring					
Marsha Mason	Arlene		Guest	Guest	Recurring	Guest		Guest
Millicent Martin	Joan-Margaret			Guest	Guest	Recurring	Recurring	Recurring
Lindsey Kraft	Allison Giampietro-Smikowitz			Recurring	Recurring	Recurring	Recurring	Recurring
Peter Gallagher	Nick Skolka			Recurring	Recurring	Recurring	Recurring	Recurring
Paul Michael Glaser	Leo					Recurring		
Ed Asner	Howard Jay					Guest		Guest
Jack Plotnick	Paul			Recurring	Recurring	Guest		
Megan Ferguson	Nadia			Guest	Recurring			
Scott Evans	Oliver				Recurring	Recurring		
Stacey Farber	Jo				Recurring			
Mark Deklin	Roy				Recurring	Guest		
Lisa Kudrow	Sheree				Recurring			
RuPaul	Benjamin Le Day					Recurring		
Angelique Cabral	Liz					Guest	Recurring	
Christine Woods	Jessica						Recurring	Recurring
Michael McKean	Jack						Recurring	Guest
Mary Steenburgen	Miriam						Recurring	
Brooke D'Orsay	Chelsea						Recurring	
Niccole Thurman	Elena Seda							Recurring

== Episodes ==
Season	Episodes		Originally released
1	13		May 8, 2015
2	13		May 6, 2016
3	13		March 24, 2017
4	13		January 19, 2018
5	13		January 18, 2019
6	13		January 15, 2020
7	16	4	August 13, 2021
7	16	12	April 29, 2022

== Production ==
=== Development ===
In March 2014, Netflix finalized a deal for a 13-episode straight-to-series order for Grace and Frankie, with Jane Fonda and Lily Tomlin attached to star in the lead roles. The series was written and created by Marta Kauffman and Howard J. Morris, who also serve as executive producers alongside Fonda, Tomlin, Paula Weinstein and Tate Taylor, and Skydance Productions' Dana Goldberg, David Ellison, and Marcy Ross. It premiered on May 8, 2015, with all 13 episodes released simultaneously.

On May 26, 2015, Netflix renewed the series for a second season which premiered on May 6, 2016. On December 10, 2015, the series was renewed for a third season which premiered on March 24, 2017. On April 12, 2017, the series was renewed for a fourth season, which premiered on January 19, 2018. On February 15, 2018, the series was renewed for a fifth season, which premiered on January 18, 2019. The sixth season was announced on January 15, 2019, and premiered on January 15, 2020.

On September 4, 2019, the series was renewed for a seventh and final season consisting of 16 episodes. On March 12, 2020, production was halted on the final season, due to the COVID-19 pandemic. Jane Fonda indicated in an interview that production planned to resume filming in January 2021. Production was delayed again and resumed in June 2021. The seventh and final season premiered on August 13, 2021, when the first four episodes of the season were made available. The remaining 12 episodes of the season was released on April 29, 2022.

=== Casting ===
Casting announcements began in June 2014, with Martin Sheen cast in the role of Robert, Grace's husband. The following month, Sam Waterston was cast in the role of Sol, Frankie's husband. June Diane Raphael and Baron Vaughn were then added to the cast, with Raphael cast in the role of Brianna, Grace and Robert's elder daughter, who rebels against Grace's decorum. Vaughn signed onto the role of Nwabudike, Frankie and Sol's son. Shortly afterwards, Ethan Embry and Brooklyn Decker were cast in the remaining roles on the series. Embry joined in the role of Coyote, Frankie and Sol's recovering drug-addicted son, while Decker signed onto the role of Mallory, Grace and Robert's younger daughter. In October 2015, it was announced Sam Elliott would appear in the second season as Grace's love interest. In April 2017, it was reported Lisa Kudrow would appear in the fourth season as Sheree, Grace's manicurist. In February 2018, the same day as the fifth season was commissioned, RuPaul was confirmed to appear in the fifth season as a rival of Grace and Frankie. Dolly Parton was confirmed to appear in a guest starring role in the final season, making it a full reunion of the cast of 9 to 5. Parton ultimately appeared in a cameo in the final episode.

=== Filming ===
Production on season one of Grace and Frankie began in Los Angeles, California, in early August 2014, and ended in late November. Production on season two of the series began in July 2015, and ended in November the same year. Production on final season ended in November 2021.

== Reception ==
=== Critical response ===
Critical response of Grace and Frankie
Season	Rotten Tomatoes	Metacritic
1	59% (41 reviews)	58% (27 reviews)
2	91% (11 reviews)	62% (6 reviews)
3	100% (10 reviews)	—N/a
4	100% (6 reviews)	—N/a
5	100% (13 reviews)	—N/a
6	83% (6 reviews)	—N/a

The first season of Grace and Frankie received mixed reviews from critics. On the review aggregator website Rotten Tomatoes it has a rating of 57%, based on 40 reviews, with an average rating of 6.42/10. The site's critical consensus reads, "Grace and Frankie's stellar cast adds an undeniable appeal, although its sloppy dialogue and clichéd sitcom setup will still leave most viewers wanting." On Metacritic the season has a score of 58 out of 100, based on 27 critics, indicating "mixed or average reviews".

The second season received a more positive reception from critics. On Rotten Tomatoes, it has a rating of 91%, based on 11 reviews, with an average rating of 7.34/10. The site's critical consensus reads, "Grace & Frankie gets better with age in a heartwarming, character driven second season full of humor that is both fun and obnoxious." On Metacritic, the season has a score of 62 out of 100, based on 6 critics, indicating "generally favourable reviews".

The third, fourth, and fifth season each have 100% ratings on Rotten Tomatoes with average ratings of 7.5/10, 8.42/10, and 6.33/10 respectively. The site's critical consensus for season five reads, "Five seasons in, Grace & Frankie remain blissfully at the top of their game, thanks to Jane Fonda and Lily Tomlin's undeniable bond."

=== Accolades ===
Year	Award	Category	Nominee(s)	Result	Ref.
2015	67th Primetime Emmy Awards	Outstanding Lead Actress in a Comedy Series	Lily Tomlin	Nominated	
2015	20th Satellite Awards	Best Actress in a Musical or Comedy Series	Lily Tomlin	Nominated	
2015	73rd Golden Globe Awards	Best Actress – Television Series Musical or Comedy	Lily Tomlin	Nominated	
2015	Dorian Awards	TV Comedy of the Year		Nominated	
2015	Dorian Awards	TV Performance of the Year – Actress	Jane Fonda	Nominated	
2015	Dorian Awards	TV Performance of the Year – Actress	Lily Tomlin	Nominated	
2015	Dorian Awards	LBGTQ TV Show of the Year		Nominated	
2015	27th GLAAD Media Awards	Outstanding Comedy Series		Nominated	
2015	19th OFTA Awards	Best Comedy Series		Nominated	
2015	19th OFTA Awards	Best Actress in a Comedy Series	Jane Fonda	Won	
2015	19th OFTA Awards	Best Actress in a Comedy Series	Lily Tomlin	Nominated	
2015	19th OFTA Awards	Best Supporting Actor in a Comedy Series	Sam Waterston	Nominated	
2015	19th OFTA Awards	Best Ensemble in a Comedy Series		Nominated	
2015	19th OFTA Awards	Best Direction in a Comedy Series		Nominated	
2015	19th OFTA Awards	Best Writing in a Comedy Series		Nominated	
2016	68th Primetime Emmy Awards	Outstanding Lead Actress in a Comedy Series	Lily Tomlin	Nominated	
2016	68th Primetime Emmy Awards	Outstanding Costumes for a Contemporary Series, Limited Series, or Movie	Allyson Fanger, Lori DeLapp	Nominated	
2016	23rd Screen Actors Guild Awards	Outstanding Performance by a Female Actor in a Comedy Series	Jane Fonda	Nominated	
2016	23rd Screen Actors Guild Awards	Outstanding Performance by a Female Actor in a Comedy Series	Lily Tomlin	Nominated	
2016	Costume Designers Guild Awards	Outstanding Contemporary Television Series	Allyson B. Fanger	Nominated	
2016	28th GLAAD Media Awards	Outstanding Comedy Series		Nominated	
2016	Artios Awards	Outstanding Achievement in Casting - Television Pilot - Comedy	Tracy Lilienfield, Emily Towler	Nominated	
2016	20th OFTA Awards	Best Actress in a Comedy Series	Jane Fonda	Nominated	
2016	20th OFTA Awards	Best Actress in a Comedy Series	Lily Tomlin	Nominated	
2016	20th OFTA Awards	Best Ensemble in a Comedy Series		Nominated	
2017	69th Primetime Emmy Awards	Outstanding Lead Actress in a Comedy Series	Jane Fonda	Nominated	
2017	69th Primetime Emmy Awards	Outstanding Lead Actress in a Comedy Series	Lily Tomlin	Nominated	
2017	69th Primetime Emmy Awards	Outstanding Costumes for a Contemporary Series, Limited Series, or Movie	Designers: Allyson B. Fanger, Heather Pain, Lori DeLapp	Nominated	
2017	69th Primetime Emmy Awards	Outstanding Production Design for a Narrative Program (Half-Hour or Less)	Designers: Devorah Herbert, Ben Edelberg, Christopher Carlson	Nominated	
2018	70th Primetime Emmy Awards	Outstanding Lead Actress in a Comedy Series	Lily Tomlin	Nominated	
2018	70th Primetime Emmy Awards	Outstanding Contemporary Costumes	Designers: Allyson B. Fanger, Heather Pain, Lori DeLapp	Nominated	
2018	70th Primetime Emmy Awards	Outstanding Production Design for a Narrative Program (Half-Hour or Less)	Designers: Devorah Herbert, Amy Wheeler, Andrea Fenton	Nominated	
2018	24th Screen Actors Guild Awards	Outstanding Performance by a Female Actor in a Comedy Series	Jane Fonda	Nominated	
2018	24th Screen Actors Guild Awards	Outstanding Performance by a Female Actor in a Comedy Series	Lily Tomlin	Nominated	
2018	70th Writers Guild of America Awards	Episodic Comedy	Brendan McCarthy & David Budin (for "The Burglary")	Nominated	
2019	25th Screen Actors Guild Awards	Outstanding Performance by a Female Actor in a Comedy Series	Jane Fonda	Nominated	
2019	25th Screen Actors Guild Awards	Outstanding Performance by a Female Actor in a Comedy Series	Lily Tomlin	Nominated	
2020	Make-Up Artists and Hair Stylists Guilds	Best Television Series, Mini-Series or New Media Series – Best Contemporary Make-Up	Melissa Sandora, David De Leon, Bonita DeHaven	Nominated	
2020	Make-Up Artists and Hair Stylists Guilds	Best Television Series, Mini-Series or New Media Series – Contemporary Hair Styling	Kelly Kline, Jonathan Hanousek, Marlene Williams	Nominated	
2020	72nd Primetime Emmy Awards	Outstanding Contemporary Hairstyling	Kelly Kline, Marlene Williams, Jonathan Hanousek	Nominated	
2021	Make-Up Artists and Hair Stylists Guilds	Best Television Series, Mini-Series or New Media Series – Best Contemporary Make-Up	Melissa Sandora, David De Leon, Bonita DeHaven	Nominated	
2021	Make-Up Artists and Hair Stylists Guilds	Best Television Series, Mini-Series or New Media Series – Contemporary Hair Styling	Kelly Kline, Jonathan Hanousek, Marlene Williams	Nominated	
2021	73rd Writers Guild of America Awards	Episodic Comedy	Alex Kavallierou (for "The Tank")	Nominated	
2023	75th Writers Guild of America Awards	Episodic Comedy	Marta Kauffman & Howard J. Morris (for "The Beginning")	Nominated	

== Controversy ==
After the series' debut, Fonda and Tomlin expressed displeasure once it became public that their salaries were just equal to those of Waterston and Sheen, even though "the show is not 'Sol and Robert', it's 'Grace and Frankie'", in the words of Tomlin, and contended this constituted a significant pay inequity. Shortly thereafter, Waterston and Sheen went on the record to support their co-stars' demands for a salary increase, with Waterston being quoted as saying: "I think they're being cheated." After fans of the series gathered nearly 200,000 signatures on a petition protesting the disparity, the two actresses issued a public statement backing away from criticism, saying: "This just reminds us to be mindful of how things come across in interviews. We appreciate everyone's support and the attention to this issue, but the structure of Grace and Frankie is fair, and we couldn't be happier to work with Skydance, Netflix and the great cast of this show." Fonda and Tomlin made a statement to TheWrap clarifying they were never displeased with the salaries to begin with and they had in actuality "made a joke in an interview about our salaries, which was taken out of context".

== Home media ==
Title	Release date			# discs
Title	Region 1	Region 2	Region 4	# discs
Season One	April 12, 2016	April 18, 2016	November 1, 2017	3
Season Two	February 21, 2017	May 15, 2017	November 1, 2017	3
