= Meg Jackson (screenwriter) =

American screenwriter

Meg Jackson is an American screenwriter. She writes television films and series TV, including the first season of HBO's Boardwalk Empire, for which she and her colleagues were nominated for the WGA award for Best Drama Series and won for Best New Series. The show also received a Golden Globe nomination for Best Drama Series.
