= 2022 deaths in American television =

The following deaths of notable individuals related to American television occurred in 2022.

== January ==
Date	Name	Age	Notes	Source
January 3	Jay Wolpert	79	American screenwriter and producer, whose television work was most associated with game shows (1969 Jeopardy! Grand Champion, did production work on The Price Is Right, created Whew!, Hit Man, Blackout and Rodeo Drive)	
January 4	Joan Copeland	99	American actress, whose television work included regular, recurring and guest roles in several soap operas (Search for Tomorrow, Love of Life, The Edge of Night, How to Survive a Marriage, As the World Turns, Loving, All My Children, One Life to Live, Santa Barbara, Another World) and the 1960 live production of The Iceman Cometh as well as guest roles in Suspense, The Patty Duke Show, Naked City, Law & Order, Chicago Hope, NYPD Blue, The Defenders, All in the Family, Cagney & Lacey, American Playhouse and ER.	
January 6	Sidney Poitier	94	Bahamian-American actor/film director, was the first Black person to win an Academy Award for Best Actor (1964); television credits include the made-for-TV movies Separate but Equal, To Sir, with Love II, Mandela and de Klerk, and The Simple Life of Noah Dearborn.	
January 8	Marilyn Bergman	93	American songwriter and composer (Bracken's World, Maude, Good Times, Alice, Brooklyn Bridge, and In the Heat of the Night)	
January 9	Dwayne Hickman	87	American actor and television executive, producer and director. Hickman portrayed Chuck MacDonald, Bob Collins' girl-crazy teenage nephew, in the 1950s The Bob Cummings Show and the title character in the 1960s sitcom The Many Loves of Dobie Gillis, and later served as a programming executive at CBS from 1977 to 1988.	
January 9	Bob Saget	65	Actor and comedian best known as Danny Tanner on Full House and Fuller House, the first host of America's Funniest Home Videos, and the narrator, older Ted Mosby, on How I Met Your Mother. Other television credits include hosting the game show 1 vs. 100; lead roles in Raising Dad, Surviving Suburbia and the telefilm Father and Scout; and directing the telefilms For Hope and Becoming Dick.	
January 10	Robert Durst	78	Subject of HBO's The Jinx miniseries, in which he accidentally confessed to murder on a hot mic, which led to his conviction on first-degree homicide in the death of longtime friend Susan Berman.	
January 15	Ralph Emery	88	Country music radio/television personality, and host of the syndicated Pop! Goes the Country and The Nashville Network's Nashville Now	
January 18	Peter Robbins	65	Child actor best known for originating the voice of Charlie Brown, from A Charlie Brown Christmas through It Was a Short Summer, Charlie Brown	
January 18	André Leon Talley	73	Fashion journalist and stylist; served as a judge on America's Next Top Model, and as a contributor for Entertainment Tonight.	
January 19	Gaspard Ulliel	37	French actor (Moon Knight)	
January 20	Meat Loaf	74	Singer and actor; television credits include musical guest appearances on Saturday Night Live (in 1978 and 1981), and starring as Doug Rennie in Ghost Wars.	
January 21	Louie Anderson	68	Actor and comedian, best known for Emmy-winning role as Christine Baskets on Baskets. Other notable television credits include serving as creator and star of Life with Louie, host of the syndicated version of Family Feud (from 1999 to 2002), and appearing as a regular panelist on Funny You Should Ask.	
January 22	Kathryn Kates	73	American actress; television credits include recurring and guest roles in Seinfeld, Orange Is the New Black, Lizzie McGuire, Shades of Blue and Law & Order: Special Victims Unit. Other guest starring portrayals included Guiding Light, Santa Barbara, General Hospital, Bewitched, Saved by the Bell, and The Nanny.	
January 25	David G. Mugar	82	American businessman (founder of WHDH-TV/Boston and creator of the Boston Pops Fourth of July Fireworks Spectacular)	
January 26	Morgan Stevens	70	Actor, best known as David Reardon in Fame, Jack Gardner in A Year in the Life and Nick Diamond in Melrose Place.	
January 26	Moses J. Moseley	31	Actor (The Walking Dead)	
January 28	Donald May	92	Actor, best known as Sam Colt Jr. on Colt .45 and Adam Drake on The Edge of Night. Made guest starring roles on other soap operas (All My Children, One Life to Live, Santa Barbara).	
January 29	Howard Hesseman	81	Actor best known as DJ John "Dr. Johnny Fever" Caravella on WKRP in Cincinnati and its sequel The New WKRP in Cincinnati, Sam Royer on One Day at a Time, and Charlie Moore on Head of the Class	
January 30	Cheslie Kryst	30	Miss USA 2019 winner and correspondent for Extra	

== February ==
Date	Name	Age	Notes	Sources
February 9	Jim Angle	75	Journalist and reporter for ABC News, CNN, and Fox News (part of the latter network's inaugural reporting lineup in 1996)	
February 19	Lindsey Pearlman	43	Actress (General Hospital, Chicago Justice)	
February 19	Nightbirde	31	Singer, competed on the sixteenth season of America's Got Talent.	
February 21	Bob Beckel	73	Commentator for Fox News and CNN, an original panelist of The Five	
February 22	Johnathan Szeles	63	Stand-up comedian and magician known as "The Amazing Johnathan", hosted Ruckus, appeared on Criss Angel Mindfreak. Other guest starring roles included The Little Mermaid, The New Adventures of Winnie the Pooh, Recess, Pepper Ann, 101 Dalmatians: The Series.	
February 24	Sally Kellerman	84	Actress, appeared in Star Trek, M*A*S*H, A Little Romance, Back to School, Ready to Wear, and Maron. Other guest starring portrayals included Guiding Light, Transformers: Rescue Bots, Chicago Fire, The Transformers, Transformers: Rescue Bots Academy, Captain N: The Game Master, Back to the Future, Days of Our Lives, General Hospital, Sister, Sister, Doug, Hercules, CatDog, All That, The Brady Bunch, I Dream of Jeannie, Bewitched, Saved by the Bell, Family Matters, and The Nanny.	
February 25	Farrah Forke	54	Actress, best known as Alex Lambert on Wings, appeared on Lois & Clark: The New Adventures of Superman, and voiced Big Barda on Batman Beyond and Justice League Unlimited	
February 26	Ralph Ahn	95	Actor best known as Tran on New Girl	
February 27	Ned Eisenberg	65	Actor best known as Atty. Roger Kressler on Law & Order: Special Victims Unit	
February 28	Kirk Baily	59	Actor best known as Kevin "Ug" Lee on Salute Your Shorts, voice actor for English dubs of Trigun and Cowboy Bebop	

== March ==
Date	Name	Age	Notes	Source
March 1	Conrad Janis	94	Actor best known as Fred McConnell on Mork & Mindy and Otto Bob Palindrome on Quark. Guest star roles included Cagney & Lacey, Laverne & Shirley, Happy Days, The Oprah Winfrey Show	
March 2	Johnny Brown	84	Regular cast member of Rowan & Martin's Laugh-In, played Nathan Bookman on Good Times.	
March 3	Tim Considine	81	Writer and actor best known as Mike Douglas on My Three Sons	
March 4	Elsa Klensch	92	Fashion journalist and host of CNN's Style with Elsa Klensch	
March 4	Mitchell Ryan	88	Actor best known as Burke Devlin on Dark Shadows and Edward Montgomery on Dharma & Greg	
March 4	Jim Owens	84	American producer best known for his country music programming for The Nashville Network; husband of and collaborator with Lorianne Crook	
March 9	Jimmy Lydon	98	American actor and television producer whose career dates back to the 1930s (The Life of Riley, The First Hundred Years, Rocky Jones, Space Ranger, So This Is Hollywood, Love That Jill, The Gale Storm Show, Wagon Train)	
March 9	John Korty	85	Animator (Vegetable Soup, Sesame Street) and director (Go Ask Alice, The Autobiography of Miss Jane Pittman)	
March 10	Emilio Delgado	81	Actor, best known as Luis Rodriguez on Sesame Street, who he played from 1971 to 2016. Appeared on Hawaii Five-O, Law & Order, Falcon Crest and House of Cards	
March 11	Traci Braxton	50	Singer (Braxton Family Values)	
March 13	William Hurt	71	Emmy-nominated actor for roles in the series Damages and the TV movie Too Big to Fail. Also appeared in Goliath and Condor.	
March 14	Scott Hall	63	WWE Hall of Fame wrestler (as Razor Ramon), also wrestled in World Championship Wrestling	
March 14	Marilyn Miglin	83	Longtime host on HSN	
March 16	Merri Dee	85	News anchor and staff announcer for WGN-TV/Chicago	
March 18	John Clayton	67	ESPN NFL insider from 1995 to 2017, appeared in several This is SportsCenter ads	
March 19	Scoey Mitchell	92	Comedian (The Ed Sullivan Show, The Smothers Brothers Comedy Hour), actor (Barefoot in the Park, Rhoda), game show panelist, and writer/director/producer (13 East, Me & Mrs. C)	
March 22	Maxie Santillan Jr.	66	Actor best known as Stately Islander in Pair of Kings. He also made guest appearances in Criminal Minds and others.	
March 25	Kathryn Hays	88	Actress, best known for her role as Kim Sullivan Hughes on the CBS soap opera As the World Turns and Elizabeth Reynolds on the NBC western series The Road West. Some guest roles included The Bold and the Beautiful, Days of Our Lives, General Hospital, Guiding Light, The Young and the Restless	
March 28	Marvin J. Chomsky	92	Director, best known for work on the miniseries Roots, Holocaust, and Inside the Third Reich as well as series including Star Trek and Hawaii Five-O	
March 28	Barrie Youngfellow	75	Actress best known as Jan Hoffmeyer Gray on It's a Living, made guest appearances on I Dream of Jeannie, Bewitched, Murder, She Wrote, Trapper John, M.D., It Takes Two, Good Time Harry, Paris, Three's Company, The Jeffersons, WKRP in Cincinnati, and The Eddie Capra Mysteries	
March 29	Donald Shaffer	92	Korean War veteran who served as the model for Radar O'Reilly in the film and TV series MASH	
March 30	Tom Parker	33	British singer for The Wanted, chronicled in The Wanted Life	
March 31	Patricia MacLachlan	84	Author, wrote Hallmark Hall of Fame television films Sarah, Plain and Tall, Skylark, and Sarah, Plain and Tall: Winter's End, based on her novels.	

== April ==
Date	Name	Age	Notes	Source
April 1	Bill Fries	93	Advertising executive for Bozell & Jacobs best known for creating the character of C. W. McCall for Old Home Bread commercials; was also part of the team that coined the phrase "Corinthian leather"	
April 2	Estelle Harris	93	Actress best known as Estelle Costanza on Seinfeld. Other roles include Muriel on The Suite Life of Zack & Cody, voice roles on Dave the Barbarian, Kim Possible, Family Guy, Fanboy & Chum Chum, House of Mouse, and Futurama, and guest roles on iCarly, Cybill, Living Single, and Moesha.	
April 12	Gilbert Gottfried	67	Actor and comedian who starred on Saturday Night Live '80, co-hosted USA Up All Night, participated in five Comedy Central Roasts and was a regular panelist on the 1998-2004 iteration of Hollywood Squares. Voice credits include Iago in Aladdin, Digit on Cyberchase, Mister Mxyzptlk on Superman: The Animated Series and Justice League Action and the Aflac duck in commercials from 1999 to 2011.	
April 14	Rio Hackford	51	Actor (credits include Treme, American Crime Story, The Mandalorian, Pam & Tommy)	
April 15	Liz Sheridan	93	Actress who played Raquel Ochmonek on ALF and Helen Seinfeld on Seinfeld	
April 17	Jim Hartz	82	Anchor/reporter for KOTV/Tulsa, WNBC-TV/New York, NBC News, and WRC-TV/Washington, DC; host of NBC's Today as well as PBS' Over Easy, Innovation, and Asia Now	
April 20	Robert Morse	90	Actor, portrayed Bert Cooper on Mad Men, Dominick Dunne on The People v. O. J. Simpson: American Crime Story, with guest roles in The Fall Guy, Love, American Style, Murder, She Wrote, One Day at a Time, The Twilight Zone and Trapper John, M.D.. Voiced Santa Claus for Teen Titans Go!.	
April 27	David Birney	83	Actor, known for roles on Bridget Loves Bernie, The Adams Chronicles, Serpico, and St. Elsewhere	
April 30	Naomi Judd	76	Country music singer of The Judds, judge on Can You Duet and the 2003 iteration of Star Search, contestant on My Kitchen Rules	

== May ==
Date	Name	Age	Notes	Source
May 1	Charles Siebert	84	Actor best known as Dr. Stanley Riverside II on Trapper John, M.D.	
May 1	Jerry verDorn	72	Actor best known as Ross Marler on Guiding Light and Clint Buchanan on One Life to Live.	
May 5	Mike Hagerty	67	Actor best known as Mr. Treeger on Friends. Also starred on The George Carlin Show, Lucky Louie and Somebody Somewhere. Guest appearances include Boston Legal, Brooklyn Nine-Nine, Cheers, Community, Entourage, ER, Ghost Whisperer, Glee, Good Luck Charlie, The Goldbergs, and Seinfeld.	
May 5	Kenneth Welsh	80	Canadian actor best known as the multi-faceted villain Windom Earle in Twin Peaks. Also starred on Lodge 49. Guest appearances include The Twilight Zone, Kung Fu: The Legend Continues, The X Files, Law & Order, Smallville, Stargate Atlantis, Haven, The Expanse, and Star Trek: Discovery.	
May 15	Maggie Peterson	81	Actress best known as Charlene Darling on The Andy Griffith Show.	
May 16	John Aylward	75	Actor, portrayed Dr. Donald Anspaugh on ER and Barry Goodwin on The West Wing. Also appeared on Everwood, The Practice, Judging Amy, Boston Legal, Alias, The X-Files, Shameless, Nobodies, Briarpatch, and Yellowstone.	
May 17	Marnie Schulenburg	37	Actress, best known as Alison Stewart on As the World Turns. Also appeared on One Life to Live, Royal Pains, Blue Bloods, and Alpha House.	
May 22	Lee Lawson	80	Stage and soap opera actress (Love of Life, One Life to Live, Guiding Light)	
May 25	Thomas S. Murphy	96	Broadcasting executive (chairman/CEO of Capital Cities Communications and engineer of its 1985 acquisition of ABC)	
May 26	Ray Liotta	67	Actor, starred in Texas Rising, Shades of Blue and Black Bird, guest starred in SpongeBob SquarePants, Hannah Montana, Phineas and Ferb, Unbreakable Kimmy Schmidt and The Simpsons. Narrated The Making of the Mob.	
May 26	George Shapiro	91	Talent manager and television producer (Seinfeld)	
May 28	Joanie Greggains	81	Host and fitness instructor (Morning Stretch)	
May 28	Bo Hopkins	84	Actor best known as Matthew Blaisdel on Dynasty. Also guest starred in The Angry Beavers.	

== June ==
Date	Name	Age	Notes	Source
June 2	Joyce Burditt	83	Writer (Perry Mason, Matlock, Father Dowling Mysteries; creator of Diagnosis: Murder) and network executive at ABC and NBC	
June 9	Billy Kametz	35	Voice actor (JoJo's Bizarre Adventure: Diamond Is Unbreakable, Aggretsuko, Attack on Titan, Pokémon, The Owl House)	
June 12	Philip Baker Hall	90	Actor on The Loop, best known for guest starring on Seinfeld and Modern Family, appeared on Second Chance and Messiah.	
June 14	Everett Peck	71	Cartoonist and animator, best known as the creator of Duckman and Squirrel Boy and character designer at Adelaide Productions (Jumanji, Extreme Ghostbusters, Men in Black: The Series, Godzilla: The Series, Dragon Tales)	
June 18	Mark Shields	85	Journalist, political columnist, and news analyst for Inside Washington, PBS NewsHour, and CNN's Capital Gang	
June 22	Tony Siragusa	55	National Football League defensive tackle, Fox Sports sideline analyst from 2003 to 2015, host of Man Caves on DIY Network. Appeared on The Sopranos	
June 26	Mary Mara	61	Actress, portrayed Bryn Carson on Nash Bridges, appeared on ER, Law & Order, Lost, The West Wing and Ray Donovan	

== July ==
Date	Name	Age	Notes	Source
July 1	Robb Hanrahan	60	Former news anchorman at WHP-TV, WFOR-TV, WSVN, and WABC-TV.	
July 2	Mike Reynolds	92	Actor and voice actor; voice of various villains in the Power Rangers franchise from 1993 to 2002, most notably Captain Mutiny in 1999's Power Rangers Lost Galaxy; also provided voices in VR Troopers	
July 4	Hank Goldberg	82	ESPN NFL reporter and analyst, horse racing handicapper	
July 5	Lenny Von Dohlen	63	Actor best known as Harold Smith on Twin Peaks	
July 6	James Caan	82	Actor best known as Brian Piccolo on Brian's Song, Ed Deline on Las Vegas and Terry Gannon on Back in the Game, guest starred on The Simpsons and Family Guy	
July 7	Adam Wade	87	Singer, actor (appearances on shows including Search for Tomorrow and Sanford & Son), and the first African American game show host on American television (1975's Musical Chairs)	
July 8	Gregory Itzin	74	Actor best known as President Charles Logan on 24 and Henry Wilcox on Covert Affairs	
July 8	Tony Sirico	79	Actor best known as Paulie Gualtieri on The Sopranos, also guest starred on The Fairly OddParents, Family Guy and American Dad!	
July 8	Larry Storch	99	Actor and comedian best known as Mr. Whoopee on Tennessee Tuxedo and His Tales, Corporal Randolph Agarn on F Troop and Eddie Spencer on The Ghost Busters	
July 9	L. Q. Jones	94	Actor (Cheyenne, Rawhide, Gunsmoke, Laramie, Wagon Train, The Big Valley and The Virginian)	
July 14	Jak Knight	28	Actor (Big Mouth, Bust Down)	
July 16	Mickey Rooney Jr.	77	American actor (Voiced himself in The Mickey Mouse Club). He also made guest appearances in The Johnny Carson Show and a few others.	
July 18	Rebecca Balding	73	Actress best known as Carol David on Soap and Elise Rothman on Charmed	
July 19	Kevin Rooney	71	Comedian (appearances on Late Night with David Letterman) and writer (several shows including The Naked Truth and Dennis Miller Live)	
July 21	Taurean Blacque	82	Actor, best known as Detective Neal Washington on Hill Street Blues and Henry Marshall on Generations	
July 23	Bob Rafelson	89	Film/video director (including the video for Lionel Richie's "All Night Long") and TV producer (The Monkees)	
July 24	David Warner	80	English actor (voiced Ra's al Ghul in Batman: The Animated Series, The Lobe in Freakazoid!, and Dr. Frankenstein in Toonsylvania)	
July 25	Paul Sorvino	83	Actor known for TV roles as Officer Ike Porter on The Oldest Rookie and Sgt. Phil Cerreta on Law & Order	
July 27	Mary Alice	85	Stage/TV actor known for TV roles on A Different World and I'll Fly Away	
July 27	Tony Dow	77	Actor (best known as Wally Cleaver on Leave It to Beaver and The New Leave It to Beaver) and director (various series including The New Lassie and Star Trek: Deep Space Nine)	
July 27	Burt Metcalfe	87	Actor (most notably in "The Monsters Are Due on Maple Street" episode of The Twilight Zone), producer/writer/director (M*A*S*H) and executive (Warner Bros. Television, MTM Enterprises)	
July 30	Pat Carroll	95	Actress best known as Bunny Halper on The Danny Thomas Show, Hope Stinson on The Ted Knight Show, Gussie Holt on She's the Sheriff and the voice of Ursula in The Little Mermaid	
July 30	Nichelle Nichols	89	Actress best known as Lt. Nyota Uhura on Star Trek: The Original Series, also guest starred on Futurama and The Simpsons	

== August ==
Date	Name	Age	Notes	Source
August 2	Vin Scully	94	Sportscaster for the Brooklyn/Los Angeles Dodgers for 67 seasons (1950–2016); also worked NFL and golf broadcasts for CBS Sports (1975–1982) and Major League Baseball on NBC (1983–1989)	
August 5	Clu Gulager	93	Actor known for TV roles as Billy the Kid on The Tall Man and Deputy Sheriff Emmett Ryker on The Virginian	
August 7	Roger E. Mosley	83	Actor best known as Theodore "T.C." Calvin on the original Magnum, P.I. (1980–1988)	
August 8	Olivia Newton-John	73	Musician and actress (noted TV appearances including Glee, American Idol, Ru-Paul's Drag Race)	
August 8	Uma Pemmaraju	64	Indian-American journalist and news anchor (Fox News)	
August 10	Leslie Griffith	66	Journalist and anchor for KTVU/Oakland	
August 11	Bill Pitman	102	Guitarist and session musician (Bonanza, The Deputy, The Wild Wild West)	
August 11	Anne Heche	53	Actress best known as Vicky Hudson / Marley Love on Another World, Marin Frist on Men in Trees, Jessica Haxon on Hung, and the voice of Suyin Beifong on The Legend of Korra	
August 13	Denise Dowse	64	Actress best known as Vice-Principal Yvonne Teasley on Beverly Hills, 90210, Judge Rebecca Damsen on The Guardian and Dr. Rhonda Pyne on Insecure	
August 13	Robyn Griggs	49	Actress best known for Stephanie Hobart on One Life to Live and Maggie Cory on Another World.	
August 20	Tom Weiskopf	79	Professional golfer (winner of the 1973 Open Championship) and PGA Tour analyst for CBS Sports and ABC Sports/ESPN	
August 24	Len Dawson	87	Hall of Fame football quarterback (most notably with the Kansas City Chiefs), sportscaster with KMBC-TV/Kansas City, and analyst with NFL on NBC and HBO's Inside the NFL	
August 24	William Reynolds	90	Actor best known for Special Agent Tom Colby on The F.B.I..	
August 28	Tucker Wiard	80	Television editor (Alice, The Carol Burnett Show and Murphy Brown)	
August 29	Charlbi Dean	32	Actress who played Syonide in Black Lightning	

== September ==
Date	Name	Age	Notes	Source
September 7	David A. Arnold	54	Stand-up comedian, sitcom writer, producer, and actor (writer and producer of Fuller House and The Rickey Smiley Show, creator and showrunner of That Girl Lay Lay)	
September 7	Anne Garrels	71	TV/radio journalist, most notably as Moscow correspondent for ABC News and State Department correspondent for NBC News	
September 7	Bernard Shaw	82	Journalist, most notably as chief anchor for CNN from 1980 to 2001	
September 8	Queen Elizabeth II	96	Queen Regnant of the United Kingdom and Commonwealth realms; her coronation was one of the first transatlantic television broadcasts, and she appeared frequently on American television	
September 9	Mark Miller	97	Actor best known as Bill Hooten on Guestward, Ho!, Jim Nash on Please Don't Eat the Daisies and J.R. Barnett on Days of Our Lives	
September 10	Jack Ging	90	Actor best known as Lt. Dan Ives on Mannix, General Harlan "Bull" Fulbright on The A-Team, and Lt. Ted Quinlan on Riptide. Guest roles included Days of Our Lives, All My Children, One Life to Live, General Hospital, Guiding Light, Chicago Fire, and Knight Rider.	
September 19	Robert Brown	95	Actor best known as Jason Bolt on Here Come the Brides	
September 23	Zack Estrin	51	Producer and screenwriter (Charmed, Dawson's Creek, Tru Calling, and Lost in Space)	
September 23	Louise Fletcher	88	Actress best known as Kai Winn Adami in Star Trek: Deep Space Nine	
September 27	Joan Hotchkis	95	Actress best known as Dr. Nancy Cunningham on The Odd Couple	
September 28	Bill Plante	84	Journalist and correspondent for CBS News	
September 28	Coolio	59	Rapper and actor (TV work includes voice roles as Kwanzaabot in Futurama and as Wax Coolio in Gravity Falls, a regular panelist role on the 1998 revival of Match Game, and performing the theme song for Kenan & Kel).	
September 29	Al Primo	87	Television news executive credited with developing the Eyewitness News format (which he created in 1965 as news director at KYW-TV/Philadelphia); also served as vice president of news for ABC Owned Television Stations and co-creator of the syndicated educational program Teen Kids News	
September 30	Roger Welsch	85	Humorist, contributed "Postcards from Nebraska" features to CBS News Sunday Morning	
September 30	Peter G. Marston	87	Businessman and science professor (The Voyage of the Mimi)	

== October ==
Date	Name	Age	Notes	Source
October 5	Bernard McGuirk	64	Radio producer and antagonist to host Don Imus on Imus in the Morning, instigated the comments that got the show cancelled from MSNBC in 2007	
October 5	Sara Lee	30	Pro wrestler and contestant who won season 6 of WWE's Tough Enough	
October 6	Judy Tenuta	72	Comedian, voice-over actress and game show panelist	
October 8	Gabrielle Beaumont	80	British director (work on several American series including Dynasty, Hill Street Blues, and M*A*S*H)	
October 11	Angela Lansbury	96	Actress best known as Jessica Fletcher on Murder, She Wrote	
October 11	Willie Spence	23	Singer and runner-up on season 19 of American Idol	
October 12	Ron Hendren	77	Journalist and television personality, best known as one of the original hosts of Entertainment Tonight	
October 20	Ron Masak	86	Actor (several series, most notably as Sheriff Mort Metzger on Murder, She Wrote, and commercial roles including the voice of "The Vlasic Stork")	
October 23	Michael Kopsa	66	Voice actor (notable roles include Char Aznable in the English dub of Mobile Suit Gundam, Commander Volcott O'Huey on Galaxy Angel, Beast on X-Men: Evolution, and Roger Baxter on Littlest Pet Shop)	
October 24	Leslie Jordan	67	Actor and comedian (supporting roles on Hearts Afire, Will & Grace, American Horror Story, The Cool Kids, Call Me Kat)	
October 25	Jules Bass	87	Director, producer, composer, lyricist, author, and co-founder of Rankin/Bass Productions which created the holiday specials The Little Drummer Boy, Frosty the Snowman, Santa Claus Is Comin' to Town, Here Comes Peter Cottontail, The Year Without a Santa Claus, and Jack Frost	

== November ==
Date	Name	Age	Notes	Source
November 1	Max Maven	71	Magician and mentalist, television appearances included The Fresh Prince of Bel-Air, Mork & Mindy, and General Hospital	
November 4	David Davis	86	Television producer and writer (The Mary Tyler Moore Show, Rhoda, The Bob Newhart Show, and Taxi)	
November 5	Aaron Carter	34	Singer, television appearances included House of Carters, Lizzie McGuire, All That, Figure it Out and Rocket Power	
November 9	Fred Hickman	66	Journalist and sports anchor, most notably with CNN's Sports Tonight as well as with YES Network and ESPN	
November 10	Kevin Conroy	66	Actor best known as the voice of Bruce Wayne/Batman on Batman: The Animated Series, Chase Kendall on Search for Tomorrow, Captain Lloyd Hamilton on Ohara, Bart Fallmont on Dynasty, and Rusty Wallace on Tour of Duty	
November 11	John Aniston	89	Actor and father of Jennifer Aniston, best known as Martin Tourneur on Search for Tomorrow and Victor Kiriakis on Days of Our Lives	
November 11	Gallagher	76	Stand-up comedian best known for his watermelon-smashing "Sledge-O-Matic" routine (14 specials for Showtime)	
November 15	Gene Perret	85	Comedy writer and producer, most known for work on The Carol Burnett Show and Rowan & Martin's Laugh-In and for Bob Hope	
November 16	Nicki Aycox	47	Actress best known as Christina Rush on Cold Case, Meg Masters on Supernatural, and Jamie Allen on Dark Blue	
November 16	Robert Clary	96	Actor best known as Corporal Louis LeBeau on Hogan's Heroes, Robert LeClair on Days of Our Lives, Pierre Roulland on The Young and the Restless, and Pierre Jourdan on The Bold and the Beautiful	
November 17	Michael Gerson	58	Journalist and speechwriter who made appearances as a commentator for the PBS NewsHour and Face the Nation	
November 18	Bruce L. Christensen	79	Public television executive (general manager of KUED/Salt Lake City, president/CEO of PBS)	
November 19	Jason David Frank	49	Actor best known as Tommy Oliver in various entries in the Power Rangers franchise	
November 26	Freddie Roman	85	Stand-up comedian and actor best known as Herb on Red Oaks, also guest appearance on Law & Order: Criminal Intent	
November 28	Clarence Gilyard	66	Actor best known as Officer Benjamin Webster on CHiPs, Conrad McMasters on Matlock, and James Trivette on Walker, Texas Ranger	
November 29	Brad William Henke	56	Actor and former American football player best known as Henry "Hank" Ungalow on Going to California, Bram on Lost, Owen Dennis Rowan on October Road, Cooper Bennett on Justified, and Desi Piscatella on Orange Is the New Black	

== December ==
Date	Name	Age	Notes	Source
December 2	Al Strobel	83	Actor best known as Mike on Twin Peaks	
December 4	June Blair	90	Actress best known as June Nelson on The Adventures of Ozzie and Harriet	
December 4	Bob McGrath	90	Singer/actor best known as Bob Johnson on Sesame Street	
December 5	Kirstie Alley	71	Actress best known as Rebecca Howe on Cheers and Veronica Chase on Veronica's Closet	
December 5	Terrence O'Hara	76	Actor/director, most noted for directing work on NCIS, Smallville and Angel	
December 6	Mills Lane	85	American boxing referee and judge (Celebrity Deathmatch and Judge Mills Lane)	
December 7	Helen Slayton-Hughes	92	Actress best known as Ethel Beavers on Parks and Recreation	
December 9	Grant Wahl	49	Sports journalist and soccer analyst for Fox Sports and CBS Sports	
December 11	Angelo Badalamenti	85	Composer (Twin Peaks and Inside the Actors Studio)	
December 12	Stuart Margolin	82	Actor best known as Evelyn "Angel" Martin on The Rockford Files and Philo Sandeen on Bret Maverick	
December 13	Stephen "tWitch" Boss	40	So You Think You Can Dance runner-up, DJ on The Ellen DeGeneres Show from 2014 to 2022.	
December 15	James J. Murakami	91	Art director and production designer best known for work on Deadwood	
December 17	Drew Griffin	60	Journalist and investigative correspondent for CNN	
December 19	Sonya Eddy	55	Actress best known as Epiphany Johnson on General Hospital	
December 20	Quinn Redeker	86	Actor best known as Alex Marshall on Days of Our Lives and Rex Sterling on The Young and the Restless	
December 21	Diane McBain	81	Actress best known as Daphne Dutton on Surfside 6 and socialite Pinkie Pinkston on Batman	
December 30	Barbara Walters	93	Journalist of over 60 years, host of Today and ABC Evening News (the first female host of both), and 20/20. Created and co-hosted The View from 1997 to 2014	
December 30	Don West	59	Color commentator for Total Nonstop Action Wrestling	

== See also ==
- 2022 deaths in the United States
- 2022 in American television
