= Sarah, Plain and Tall =

1985 children's book by Patricia MacLachlan

- First hardcover edition
- Author: Patricia MacLachlan
- Language: English
- Genre: Children's novel
- Publisher: Harper & Row
- Publication date: April 1985
- Publication place: United States
- Media type: Print (hardback & paperback)
- Pages: 58
- ISBN: 0-06-024102-0
- OCLC: 11372082
- LC Class: PZ7.M2225 Sar 1985
- Followed by: Skylark

Sarah, Plain and Tall is a children's book written by Patricia MacLachlan and the winner of the 1986 Newbery Medal, the 1986 Scott O'Dell Award for Historical Fiction, and the 1986 Golden Kite Award. It explores themes of loneliness, abandonment, and coping with change.

The book was adapted as both a television film in 1991 and a one-act children's musical that was performed Off-Broadway in 2002. It was followed by four sequels exploring the Witting family after Sarah's arrival called Skylark, Caleb's Story, More Perfect Than the Moon, and Grandfather's Dance.

== Plot overview ==
The story is set in the Midwestern United States during the late 19th century. Jacob Witting, a widowed farmer who is still saddened by the death of his wife during childbirth several years before, finds that the task of taking care of his farm and two children, Anna and Caleb, is too difficult for him to handle alone. He writes an ad in the newspaper for a mail-order bride. Sarah Wheaton of Maine answers it and decides to travel to their home for a trial period of one month, in hopes of marrying Jacob.

While Anna is initially apprehensive about Sarah as she still has memories of her late mother, Caleb is excited and deeply hopes that she will stay. When she arrives, Anna notices that she is lonely and misses the sea. She is stubborn and persistent, and she gradually wins over Jacob with her insistence on learning and helping out with farm tasks. The Wittings become attached to her, even though Caleb constantly worries that their home is not enough for her and that she misses the sea. When she goes to town by wagon on her own, Anna tries to reassure Caleb that she will return, while secretly fearing that she will not. They are overjoyed when she returns by nightfall. Admitting that she misses the sea, she says that she would miss them even more if she left. Anna reveals that Jacob and Sarah are married soon afterward.

== Characters ==
- Sarah Wheaton, a young woman from Maine, finds inspiration to transform her life following her brother William's marriage. She decides to answer Jacob's ad, falls in love with the Wittings, and stays with them on their Midwestern farm.
- Anna Witting is the older sister of Caleb, daughter of Jacob, and narrator of the novel.
- Caleb Witting is the younger brother of Anna and son of Jacob. His mother died shortly after he was born.
- Jacob Witting is a widower and farmer who lives in the Midwest with his two children, Anna and Caleb.
- Matthew is the Wittings' neighbor, who placed an ad in the newspaper to find his wife, Maggie.
- Maggie is Matthew's wife and becomes friends with Sarah.

== Themes ==
According to Rita Buchoff, a professor of Children's Literature at the University of Central Florida, the book provides readers with the opportunity to explore themes such as "issues of family life, loneliness, hardship, and acceptance of life's experiences." Additionally, Martha Saxton, in a review for The New York Times, asserted that it teaches lessons about love and harmony.

== Background ==
Patricia MacLachlan began writing the book while living in New England as she missed her home in Wyoming. She was inspired to create Sarah's character by familial stories recounted by her mother during her childhood. She described her writing process as taking place in her home's music room, where she worked on a typewriter, accompanied by her dogs.

== Reception ==
Following the book's release, a New York Times book review by Martha Saxton characterized it as an "exquisite, sometimes painfully touching little tale." Saxton also wrote about the effect it will have on readers, stating, "The gentle book cannot fail to touch readers."

Karen Cushman, acclaimed author of Newbery Medal winners The Midwife's Apprentice (1995) and Catherine, Called Birdy (1994), expressed in a 2010 interview on historical fiction for children that the book holds a special place as her favorite Newbery-winning one, deeming it "a nearly perfect book."

In a 2022 article, Patricia MacLachlan reflected on the enduring legacy of the book, attributing its vitality to the ongoing connection with the children who continue to read it. She shared that she regularly receives letters from children expressing their love for it, and some visit her home to give her drawings inspired by it, illustrating the impact it holds for them.

=== Awards ===
In 1986, Patricia MacLachlan received the Newbery Medal for the book, an accolade recognizing outstanding contributions to American literature for children. It also received the Scott O’Dell Award for Historical Fiction and the Golden Kite Award for children's fiction both in the same year, acknowledging excellence in the realm of children's literature. Furthermore, in 1985, it was selected as a Cooperative Children's Book Center (CCBC) Choices selection.

=== Educational use ===
The book has found application in both classroom and writing workshops. Karen Cushman, a recipient of the Newbery Medal, utilized its first page in an adult writing class, asserting that MacLachlan encapsulates "everything that you have to do in a first chapter, or in a first fifty pages" within a single page.

In educational settings, the book has been chosen for read-aloud sessions by teachers for its social pragmatic purpose, content, and theme. In addition, as noted by professor of children's literature Rita Buchoff, it serves as a valuable resource for addressing issues of family life, loneliness, hardship, and acceptance of life's experiences, making it a good one for teachers and parents to read to children. Recognizing the need for a broader perspective, some institutions like the American Library Association, suggest pairing it with contemporary works such as Prairie Lotus (2020) by Linda Sue Park or The Many Reflections of Miss Jane Deming (2017) by J. Anderson Coats. They believe that these companion reads will not only supplement potentially outdated information, limited point of view, and old-fashioned attitudes in older Newbery Medal winners, but also offer nuanced perspectives on themes like moving for a new life and harboring hope for change, that would enrich the overall reading experience of the book.

== Adaptations ==
=== Film adaptations ===
The book was adapted into a 1991 television film of the same name that is directed and produced by Glenn Jordan from a teleplay by MacLachlan and Carol Sobieski. It stars Glenn Close and Christopher Walken, and received nine Primetime Emmy Award nominations (winning one).

The next two books in the series, Skylark and Caleb's Story, were the basis for two more television films—Skylark and Sarah, Plain and Tall: Winter's End. MacLachlan wrote them, and the same actors played the roles of Sarah, Jacob, Anna, and Caleb.

=== Stage adaptation ===
The book was made into a one-act children's musical and produced by TheatreWorksUSA. The score is by Laurence O'Keefe and Nell Benjamin. It ran off-Broadway at the Lucille Lortel Theatre during summer 2002 with a cast that included Becca Ayers as Sarah and John Lloyd Young as Caleb. It was brought back to New York in 2004, with a sold-out three-week run off-Broadway. It also ran at the O'Neill Theater Center in Waterford, Connecticut in August 2003, with direction by Joe Calarco and featuring Kaitlin Hopkins.

== Sequels ==
Sarah, Plain and Tall is the first book in Patricia MacLachlan's five-book series. The books that follow are:

- Skylark (1994) – In the sequel to Sarah, Plain and Tall, while Jacob deals with the prairie that suffers from a drought, Sarah takes Anna and Caleb to her home in Maine to take refuge.
- Caleb's Story (2001) – In the third installment, narrated by Caleb, Jacob is reunited with his father and Sarah has her baby, Cassie. In addition, Anna takes a job in town working for a local doctor and leaves Caleb with the task of recording the family's history in a journal.
- More Perfect than the Moon (2004) – In the fourth book in the series, Cassie writes her observations on life on the farm with her family. Sarah becomes pregnant again and Cassie has to come to terms with her feelings of abandonment.
- Grandfather's Dance (2006) – In the last novel of the series, narrated by Cassie, Sarah helps Anna plan her wedding to Justin. Cassie develops a close bond with her new baby brother, Jack. The series ends with Anna and Justin's wedding that has similarities to Sarah and Jacob's.

Awards
Preceded by The Hero and the Crown	Newbery Medal recipient 1986	Succeeded by The Whipping Boy
