= Lexi Randall =

American actress

- Born: January 1, 1980 (age 46); Houston, Texas, U.S.
- Occupation: Actress
- Years active: 1990–1999

Lexi Randall (born January 1, 1980) is a former child actress in films and television. She appeared in the film The Long Walk Home (1990) and The War (1994) with Kevin Costner and Elijah Wood. Randall starred in the three television movies made from the novel Sarah, Plain and Tall. She also was in a starring role, “In the Best Interest of the Children” and was a recurring character in the television series Designing Women as Randa Oliver .

== Filmography ==
=== Film ===
Year	Title	Role	Notes
1990	The Long Walk Home	Mary Catherine	
1994	The War	Lidia Joanne Simmons	
1995	The Stars Fell on Henrietta	Beatric Day	

=== Television ===
Year	Title	Role	Notes
1990–91	Designing Women	Randa Oliver	Recurring role
1991	The Young Riders	Daisy	"Daisy"
1991	Sarah, Plain and Tall	Anna Witting	TV film
1992	In the Best Interest of the Children	Jessica Cain	TV film
1993	Heidi	Klara	TV miniseries
1993	Skylark	Anna Witting	TV film
1993	Miracle Child	Taffy Marshall	TV film
1995	Are You Afraid of the Dark?	Cindy	"The Tale of the Mystical Mirror"
1999	Sarah, Plain and Tall: Winter's End	Anna Witting	TV film
