= Lily Malone =

Lily Malone may refer to:

- Lily Malone, character in Baby (2000 film)
- Dorothy Parker, inspiration for Lily Malone in Hotel Universe
