= The War (film) =

- Theatrical release poster
- Directed by: Jon Avnet
- Written by: Kathy McWorter
- Produced by: Jon Avnet; Jordan Kerner; Eric Eisner; Todd Baker
- Starring: Elijah Wood; Kevin Costner; Mare Winningham; Lexi Randall
- Cinematography: Geoffrey Simpson
- Edited by: Debra Neil-Fisher
- Music by: Thomas Newman
- Production companies: Island World; Avnet/Kerner Productions
- Distributed by: Universal Pictures
- Release date: November 4, 1994
- Running time: 126 minutes
- Country: United States
- Language: English
- Budget: $34 million
- Box office: $16 million

The War is a 1994 American drama film directed by Jon Avnet and starring Elijah Wood, Kevin Costner, and Mare Winningham. It is a coming of age tale set in Mississippi in the 1970s. Despite a weak box-office opening and moderately unfavorable reviews, the film gained praise from critics for the lead performances.

== Plot ==
Stephen Simmons, a Vietnam veteran suffering from Post-traumatic stress disorder returns from a mental hospital. He entered it voluntarily because he was suffering from nightmares about the war and had in consequence lost three jobs in a row. After having been treated and coming home again, he gets a new job as a janitor at a grammar school, but loses it again within a few days because of a law forbidding people who spent time in a mental hospital to work within the vicinity of children. However, the Simmons family needs money, so Stephen continues looking for work, and finds a job picking potatoes. There he makes friends with a man called Moe Henry, with whose help he succeeds in obtaining a better job working in a mine.

Meanwhile, Stephen's children, twins Lidia and Stu, try to escape from the dreary reality of their lives. They find a tree in a forest close to their house and decide to build a tree house. At first, they and their friends argue over who must construct it and who is allowed to use it; the three boys - Stu, Chet and Marsh - want it all to themselves, while the girls - Lidia, Elvadine and Amber - want them to work on it and share it afterwards. After several deals, they agree to build the house together. The girls get everything they need from a garbage dump being squatted on by the Lipnickis, a neighboring family with a reputation for bullying, who have a grudge against the Simmons and their friends. Billy, the youngest of the Lipnicki kids, discovers Lidia, Elvadine and Amber at the dump, so the girls must pay him to keep quiet. With his earnings, he purchases many popsicles and goes into a candy coma, which then bring suspicion and anger from his family. He is then forced to give away Lidia's secret.

While the children are busy building the house, Stephen and Moe are caught in a collapse as they drain water out of a cavern. Moe is caught under falling rubble, but Stephen, who in Vietnam had to leave his best friend to die in order to be rescued himself, is determined to save him, even if it costs him his own life. He frees Moe, but is hit by falling rocks himself, and though the two men are both rescued, Stephen is badly hurt and comatose, being put on life-support in the hospital.

While Stu and Lidia fear for Simmons's life, the Lipnickis find the treehouse and take it over, stealing the lock and key, which belonged to Stephen. However, they agree to return them if Stu can win a bet - swimming a lap around the inside of a water-tower while it drains - which he does. The children can keep the place, but not before the Lipnickis throw the key onto the rotted roof of the water-tower, saying that if Stu wants it, he can get it back himself. Stephen is later taken off life-support, and dies. When the kids flee from home to the treehouse, they discover that the Lipnickis have returned. In the fight that erupts between them, the treehouse is destroyed. Meanwhile, Billy Lipnicki protests against all the fighting, asking why they cannot share the fort, but is ignored. He takes it on himself to go to the water tower to retrieve the key, but the roof caves in just as Stu and the others find him, and he almost drowns in the water tower. Stu rescues and resuscitates him together with Lidia, and Billy tells them he saw an angel, one who "looked like [Stu,] only bigger," (implied to be Stephen) who said that he had to stay on Earth and take care of his daddy.

From that time on the Lipnickis stop fighting with the others and stay out of their way, except for Billy, who becomes a good friend to them. The twins and their friends start to rebuild the treehouse, but give up days later due to lack of interest. Also, they learn that their father bought them a new house before he died and are happy to have a proper home again at last.

== Cast ==
- Elijah Wood as Stu Simmons
- Kevin Costner as Stephen Simmons, Stu's father
- Mare Winningham as Lois Simmons, Stu's mother
- Lexi Randall as Lidia Joanne Simmons, Stu's fraternal twin sister
- Christine Baranski as Miss Strapford
- Gary Basaraba as Dodge
- Raynor Scheine as Mr. Lipnicki
- Nick Searcy as John Ray Wilkens
- Bruce A. Young as Moe Henry
- LaToya Chisholm as Elvadine
- Christopher Fennell as Billy Lipnicki
- Donald Sellers as Arliss Lipnicki
- Leon Sills as Leo Lipnicki
- Will West as Lester Lucket
- Brennan Gallagher as Marsh
- Jennifer Tyler as Ula Lipnicki
- Lucas Black as Ebb Lipnicki
- Charlette Julius as Amber

== Production ==
The film was purchased in February 1993 by Island World who paid $500,000 cash for the spec script by Kathy McWorter. Kevin Costner joined the film in June 1993. Principal photography wrapped in April 1994.

== Critical response ==
Wood earned praise for his role, as did Costner, but the film itself received mostly unfavorable reviews from critics who criticized the script and Avnet's directing. It currently holds a 25% rating on Rotten Tomatoes based on 16 reviews. Roger Ebert of the Chicago Sun-Times gave the film two stars out of four, criticizing the fusion of war trauma and intimate family drama. However, he did praise Wood, saying "Elijah Wood has emerged, I believe, as the most talented actor in his age group, in Hollywood history."

Janet Maslin of The New York Times praised Costner and Wood's performances, saying the father-son bond was the film's strongest element. However, Maslin felt that the film "contends with too many minor plot threads and a too-wrenching switch of gears late in the story. As written atmospherically but sometimes preachily by Kathy McWorter, it incorporates a wider array of lessons than it can comfortably handle." Brian Lowry of Variety called the film "earnest but over-cooked", criticizing its use of the Vietnam War as "heavy-handed". Lisa Schwarzbaum of Entertainment Weekly gave the film a C+, but gave commendations to Costner, writing, "He's nicely weighted (figuratively and literally, with an attractive hint of middle-aged bulk — hey, the guy looks great). And in a plot heavy with sentimentality, he maintains a light touch." Schwarzbaum also gave praise to Wood, but complained that Avnet and screenwriter Kathy McWorter were too-heavy-handed in their storytelling choices. Empire, by contrast, gave the film four stars, deeming it "a superior movie that matches intelligent metaphor with outstanding performances."

== Awards nominations ==
Elijah Wood was nominated for a YoungStar Award in the category of Best Performance by a Young Actor in a Drama Film while Lexi Randall was nominated for a Young Artist Award in the category of Best Performance by a Young Actress Co-Starring in a Motion Picture.
