= Edwin B. Self =

Edwin Byron Self in 1926.

Edwin Byron Self (1 May 1896 – 9 May 1980) was an American playwright, novelist, and businessman.

== Biography ==
The son of William E. Self and Sallie Self (née McCleane), Edwin Byron Self was born in Lexington, Kentucky on 1 May 1896. His father worked as a bookkeeper for the Tattersall's stables in Lexington. He received his primary school education at Harrison School in his native city. He started working for newspapers after completing the 7th grade; getting his first job with a paper in Knoxville, Tennessee. In his early life he worked in several different newspaper jobs; beginning as a "galley boy" and working his way up to business manager.

At the time of his father's death in 1916 Edwin was employed in the advertising department of The Lexington Leader. He took a job with The Cincinnati Post which was then part of the Scripps-McRae League of Newspapers, and there established the advertising service department. He married Elizabeth Christine Fundus in Cincinnati, Ohio on 10 Nov 1917. Elizabeth was also an employee at The Cincinnati Post, and they met while working together.

Self relocated to Dayton, Ohio in c. 1921 where he worked as a sales promotion and advertising manager for the Goodyear Tire and Rubber Company. He translated Gabriela Zapolska's The Morality of Mrs. Dulska from Polish into English for a 1923 staging of the play at the Metropolitan Theater in Cleveland. He was the author of three plays that were staged on Broadway: Junk (1927, Garrick Theatre), Two Strange Women (1933, Little Theatre), and The Distant City (1941, Longacre Theatre). His play She Waar Different was staged at the Red Barn Theatre in Locust Valley, New York in 1932.

In 1930 Self relocated to Chicago where he established his own advertising agency. He left Chicago in 1937 when he was appointed advertising and merchandising manager for the Joseph Schlitz Brewing Company in Milwaukee. His novel, Limbo City, was published in 1946. That same year he moved to Los Angeles, California when he was appointed vice-president and chairman of Makelim Associates. In the 1950s he worked as the director of advertising for the television program Schlitz Playhouse of Stars. His play Half a Miracle was staged at the Las Palmas Theatre in Los Angeles in 1969 with a cast led by Jack Bailey and Florence Lake.

Edwin B. Self died on May 9, 1980, in Los Angeles. His son was the American television executive and producer William Edwin Self.
