= The Frank Sinatra Show (1957 TV series) =

American TV variety and drama series (1957–1958)

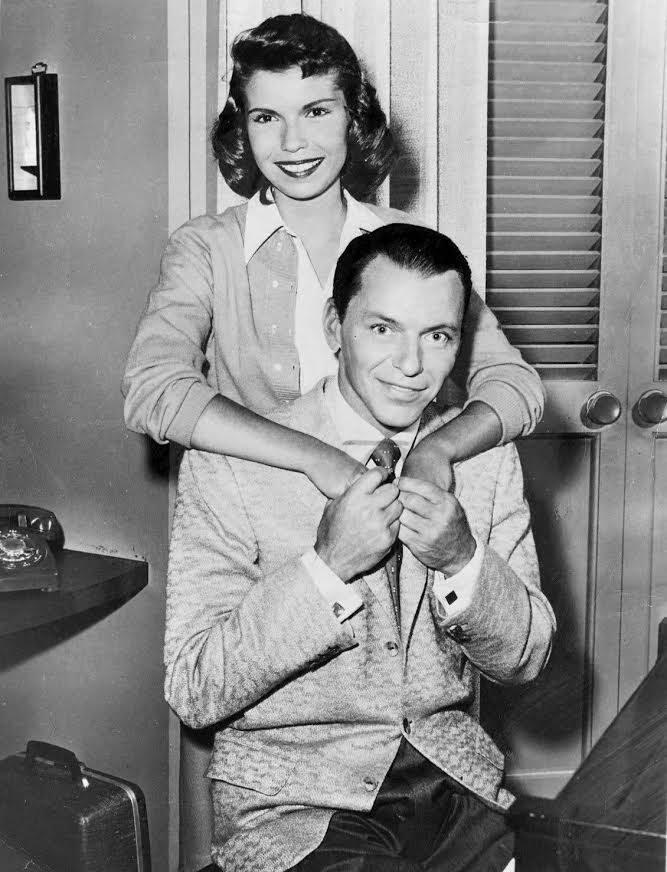
- Frank and Nancy Sinatra at a rehearsal, 1957
- Genre: Music
- Written by: John Bradford
- Directed by: Kirk Browning
- Presented by: Frank Sinatra
- Country of origin: United States
- Original language: English
- No. of seasons: 1
- No. of episodes: 32

Production
- Producer: William Self
- Running time: 26 minutes

Original release
- Network: ABC
- Release: October 18, 1957 – June 27, 1958

The Frank Sinatra Show is an ABC variety and drama series, starring Frank Sinatra, premiering on October 18, 1957, and last airing on June 27, 1958.

== Summary ==
This was Sinatra's second attempt at a television series, his first was The Frank Sinatra Show on CBS Television (1950–1952).

The series was originally slated to consist of one-third variety episodes, one-third dramas starring Sinatra, and one-third dramas hosted by Sinatra. Sinatra was paid $3 million for the series, and "given carte blanche to do it exactly as he wanted to."

Nelson Riddle directed the orchestra for the variety episodes. Beginning on March 29, 1958, Jesse White became a regular on the variety episodes.

The drama segments of the show fared less well against the variety episodes in ratings and the final total was fourteen live variety shows, eight filmed variety shows, four dramas starring Sinatra, and six dramas hosted by Sinatra. Rather than 36 episodes for the season, ABC cut its losses and reduced the total number to 32.

Sinatra hated rehearsing, and tried to make eleven shows in fifteen days; the series subsequently received a critical mauling and was Sinatra's last attempt at a television series.

Black and white copies of kinescopes of several shows have been released on VHS and DVD.

== Guest appearances ==
- Johnny Crawford
- Bing Crosby
- Susan Cummings
- Sammy Davis Jr.
- Ella Fitzgerald
- Bob Hope
- Peter Lawford
- Peggy Lee
- Dean Martin
- The McGuire Sisters
- Cheerio Meredith
- Ethel Merman
- Robert Mitchum
- Elvis Presley
- Eleanor Roosevelt
- Nancy Sinatra
- Pat Suzuki
- Natalie Wood

== Episodes ==
- Bob Hope, Peggy Lee and Kim Novak - Oct. 18, 1957
- That Hogan Man - Oct. 25, 1957
- The Tri-Tones - Nov. 1, 1957
- Peggy Lee - Nov. 8, 1957
- The McGuire Sisters - Nov. 15, 1957
- Erin O'Brien - Nov. 22, 1957
- Dean Martin - Nov. 29, 1957
- A Gun at His Back - Dec. 6, 1957
- Take Me Back to Hollywood - Dec. 13, 1957
- Happy Holidays with Bing and Frank - Dec. 20, 1957 A half-hour show filmed in 35mm color
- The Feeling is Mutual - Dec. 27, 1957
- Dinah Shore - Jan. 3, 1958
- Robert Mitchum - Jan. 10, 1958
- Louis Prima and Keely Smith - Jan. 17, 1958
- Jo Stafford - Jan. 24, 1958
- Sammy Davis Jr. - Jan. 31, 1958
- Jeannie Carson - Feb. 7, 1958
- Shirley Jones - Feb. 14, 1958
- A Time to Cry - Feb. 21, 1958
- Van Johnson - Feb. 28, 1958
- Edie Adams - Mar. 7, 1958
- Eydie Gormé - Mar. 14, 1958
- The Man on the Stairs - Mar. 21, 1958
- Eddie Fisher - Mar. 28, 1958
- Spike Jones and Helen Grayco - Apr. 4, 1958
- The Brownstone Incident - Apr. 18, 1958
- Ethel Merman - Apr. 25, 1958
- Ella Fitzgerald - May 9, 1958
- The Green Grass of Saint Theresa - May 16, 1958
- Pat Suzuki and Natalie Wood - May 23, 1958
- Face of Fear - May 30, 1958
- The Seedling Doubt - Jun. 6, 1958

== Production ==
Paul Dudley produced and wrote for The Frank Sinatra Show; William Self was the director. Liggett & Myers bought the show before it debuted, as a vehicle for advertising Chesterfield cigarettes. The trade publication Billboard reported that the program "will be TV's most expensive half-hour" at $66,000 per week. The Bulova Watch Company was a co-sponsor.

Initially episodes were filmed at the El Capitan Theatre in Hollywood. It was broadcast on Fridays from 9 to 9:30 p.m. EasternTime, when its competition included The Phil Silvers Show, M Squad on CBS and Mr. Adams and Eve on NBC. Low ratings led to changes, including having an audience during filming and presenting more musical episodes. The New York Times reported in December 1957 that the show "recently inserted a live presentation in an effort to improve its rating." Although the premiere's rating was a "whopping 29.1 Trendex, outranking combined network competition", about a month later the trade publication Television Digest reported, "Major salvage job being attempted by ABC-TV on its expensive, but low-rated Frank Sinatra Show".

== Critical response ==
The trade publication Broadcasting began a review of the show's premiere episode with "For sheer disappointment, it is hard to beat the long-awaited premiere of the Frank Sinatra Show on ABC-TV. The hour was marked by banality, stilted comedy, and free plugs ..." The review praised Sinatra's singing and said, "He should have sung for the entire hour." The episode's guest stars received negative comments also. Bob Hope "proved just mildly amusing"; Kim Novak "added nothing" and "was painful to watch" in a skit"; and Peggy Lee "was just plain unexciting".

As the show's run was ending, the trade publication Ross Reports commented, "The end of the Frank Sinatra Show, seemingly not lamented by any one concerned in its sponsorship or production, affirms for variety specialists that a strong production hand with a good planning sense is as important as a star attraction."
