= Steven Kellogg =

American author and illustrator (born 1941)

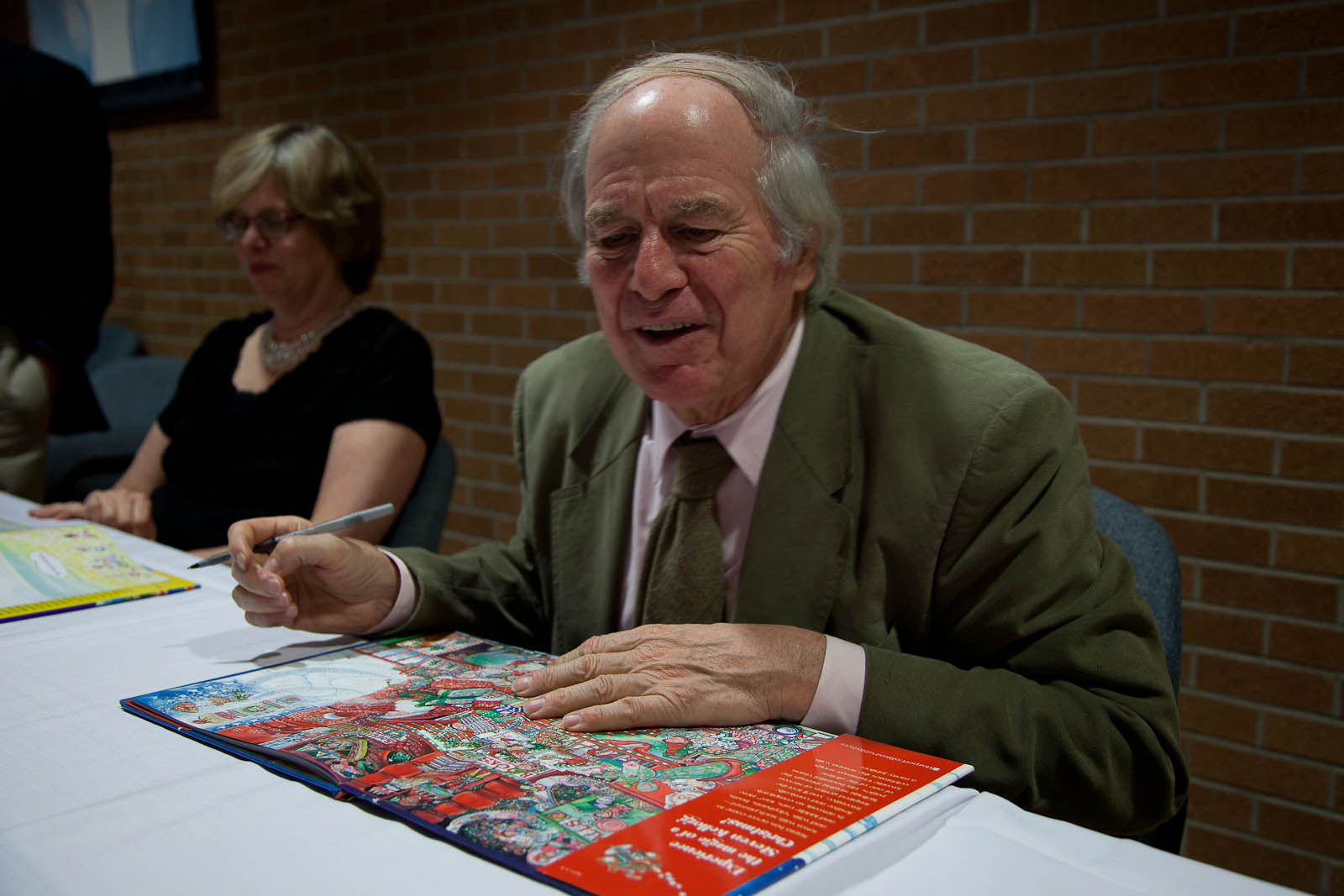
- Kellogg at the Mazza Museum in 2011
- Born: Steven Castle Kellogg; October 6, 1941 (age 85); Norwalk, Connecticut, USA
- Occupations: Illustrator, writer
- Spouse: Helen Hill (m. 1967)
- Children: Pamela, Melanie, Kimberly, Laurie, Kevin and Colin (adopted)

Signature
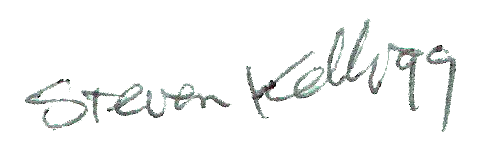

Steven Castle Kellogg (born October 6, 1941, in Norwalk, Connecticut) is an American author and illustrator who has created more than 90 children's books.

On November 12, 2011, Kellogg was given an honorary Doctor of Humane Letters from the University of Findlay in Ohio. All of his original illustrations were donated to the Mazza Museum of International Art from Picture Books at Findlay. The donation was made possible in part by a $350,000 gift by close friend, Anthony Edwards. More than 2700 works of art were included.

== Biography ==
He was born in Norwalk, Connecticut, to Robert E. and Hilma Marie (Johnson) Kellogg. His love of writing and illustrating led to his being accepted at the Rhode Island School of Design. While a student, he won a scholarship to study abroad for a year in Italy.

Steven Kellogg is also a member of the Board of Directors of the National Children's Book and Literacy Alliance a national not-for-profit organization that advocates for literacy, literature, and libraries, where he serves as a vice-president.

In 1967, Kellogg married Helen Hill Kellogg. Almost immediately, he began illustrating books by other authors, and soon afterwards wrote and illustrated his own titles. He lives in Essex, New York.

Kellogg is a winner of the Regina Medal for his lifetime contribution to children's literature. His books have received a variety of awards, including being named Reading Rainbow featured selections and winning the Boston Globe-Horn Book Award, the Irma Simonton Black Award, the IRA-CBC Children's Choice Award, and the Parents’ Choice Award.

== Works ==
Kellogg's works showcase highly detailed pen and ink drawings that evolved to a singular style of watercolor and pen. His first children's book, Gwot! and Other Horribly Funny Hair Ticklers, written by George Mendoza, was published in 1967.

=== Author and illustrator ===
- The Wicked Kings of Bloon (1970)
- The Mystery Beast of Ostergeest (1971)
- Can I Keep Him? (1971)
- Much Bigger Than Martin (1971)
- Won't Somebody Play with Me? (1972)
- The Orchard Cat (1972)
- The Island of the Skog (1973)
- The Mystery of the Missing Red Mitten (1974)
- There Was an Old Woman (1974)
- Yankee Doodle (1976)
- The Mysterious Tadpole (1977)
- The Mystery of the Magic Green Ball (1978)
- Pinkerton, Behave! (1979)
- The Mystery of the Flying Orange Pumpkin (1980)
- A Rose for Pinkerton (1981)
- The Mystery of the Stolen Blue Paint (1982)
- Tallyho, Pinkerton! (1982)
- Ralph's Secret Weapon (1983)
- Paul Bunyan (1984)
- Chicken Little (1985)
- Best Friends (1986)
- Pecos Bill (1986)
- Prehistoric Pinkerton (1986)
- Aster Aardvark's Alphabet Adventures (1987)
- Johnny Appleseed (1988)
- The Big Book for Peace (1990)
- Jack and the Beanstalk (1991)
- Mike Fink (1992)
- The Christmas Witch (1992)
- The Three Little Pigs (1993)
- The Adventures of Huckleberry Finn (1994)
- Sally Ann Thunder Ann Whirlwind Crockett (1995)
- I Was Born About 10,000 Years Ago: A Tall Tale (1996)
- More Than Anything Else (1997)
- A-Hunting We Will Go! (1998)
- The Three Sillies (1999)
- Give the Dog a Bone (2000)
- The Missing Mitten Mystery (2000)
- Big Bear Ball (2001)
- A Penguin Pup for Pinkerton (2001)
- Pinkerton & Friends (2004)
- The Pied Piper's Magic (2009)
- And I Love You (2010)

=== Illustrator only ===
- Gwot! Horribly Funny Hairticklers (1967)
- The Rotten Book (1969)
- Martha Matilda O'Toole (written by Jim Copp) (1969)
- Brave Johnny O'Hare (written by Eleanor B. Heady) (1969)
- Mister Rogers' Song Book (1970)
- Can't You Pretend? (written by Miriam Young) (1970)
- Mrs. Purdy's Children (written by Ruth Loomis) (1970)
- Granny and the Desperadoes (written by Peggy Parish) (1970)
- Matilda Who Told Lies (written by Hilaire Belloc) (1970)
- Crabapple Night (written by Jan Wahl) (1971)
- Here Comes Tagalong (written by Anne Mallett) (1971)
- The Very Peculiar Tunnel (written by Jan Wahl) (1972)
- The Castles of the Two Brothers (written by Aileen Friedman) (1972)
- Abby (written by Jeannette Caines) (1973)
- Come Here, Cat (written by Joan L. Nodset) (1973)
- You Ought to See Herbert's House (written by Doris Herold Lund) (1973)
- Kisses and Fishes (1974)
- The Great Christmas Kidnapping Caper (written by Jean Van Leeuwen) (1974)
- Hilaire Belloc's The Yak, The Python, and the Frog: A Picture Book Production (1975)
- The Boy Who Was Followed Home (written by Margaret Mahy) (1975)
- How The Witch Got Alf (written by Cora Annett) (1975)
- The Smartest Bear and His Brother Oliver (written by Alice Bach) (1975)
- Awful Alexander (written by Judith Choate) (1976)
- Gustav the Gourmet Giant (written by LouAnn Gaeddert) (1976)
- The Most Delicious Camping Trip Ever (written by Alice Bach) (1976)
- Yankee Doodle (written by Edward Bangs) (1976)
- Barney Bipple's Magic Dandelions (written by Carol Chapman) (1977)
- Grouchy Uncle Otto (written by Alice Bach) (1977)
- Appelard and Liverwurst (written by Mercer Mayer) (1978)
- Millicent the Magnificent (written by Alice Bach) (1978)
- The Pickle Plan (written by Marilyn Singer) (1978)
- Jill the Pill (written by Julia Castiglia) (1979)
- Molly Moves Out (written by Susan Pearson) (1979)
- Once, Said Darlene (written by William Sleator) (1979)
- There's An Elephant in the Garage (written by Douglas F. Davis) (1979)
- Uproar on Hollercat Hill (written by Jean Marzollo) (1980)
- Leo, Zack, and Emmie (written by Amy Ehrlich) (1981)
- Liverwurst is Missing (written by Mercer Mayer) (1981)
- A Change of Plans (written by Alan Benjamin) (1982)
- The Ten-Alarm Camp-Out (written by Cathy Warren) (1983)
- A, My Name Is Alice (written by Jane Bayer) (1984)
- The Steven Kellogg Connection (1985)
- Iva Dunnit and the Big Wind (written by Carol Purdy) (1985)
- Leo, Zack, and Emmie Together Again (written by Amy Ehrlich) (1987)
- Is Your Mama a Llama? (written by Deborah Guarino) (1989)
- The Day the Goose Got Loose (written by Reeve Lindbergh) (1990)
- Engelbert the Elephant (written by Tom Paxton) (1990)
- Parents in the Pigpen, Pigs in the Tub (written by Amy Ehrlich) (1992)
- The Great Quillow (written by James Thurber) (1993)
- Library Lil (written by Suzanne Williams) (1993)
- The Wizard Next Door (written by Peter Glassman) (1993)
- The Rattlebang Picnic (written by Margaret Mahy) (1994)
- Snuffles and Snouts (1995)
- Frogs Jump: A Counting Book (1996)
- A Beasty Story (written by Bill Martin, Jr.) (1999)
- The Baby Beebee Bird (written by Diane Redfield Massie) (2000)
- Clorinda (written by Robert Kinerk) (2002)
- Santa Claus Is Comin' to Town (written by J. Fred Coots & Hayden Gillespie) (2004)
- Clorinda Takes Flight (written by Robert Kinerk) (2005)
- If You Decide to Go to the Moon... (written by Faith McNulty) (2005)
- The Invisible Moose (written by Dennis Haseley) (2005)
- Clorinda Plays Baseball! (written by Robert Kinerk) (2012)
- Farty Marty (written by B.J. Ward) (2013)
- The Green Bath (written by Margaret Mahy) (2013)
- Snowflakes Fall (written by Patricia MacLachlan) (2013)
- The Word Pirates (written by Susan Cooper) (2019)

==== Jimmy's Boa ====
- The Day Jimmy's Boa Ate the Wash (1980)
- Jimmy's Boa and the Bungee Jump Slam Dunk (1980)
- Jimmy's Boa Bounces Back (1982)
- Jimmy's Boa and the Big Splash Birthday Bash (1988)

==== Marvelosissimo the Mathematical Magician ====
- How Much is a Million? (1985)
- If You Made a Million (1989)
- Millions to Measure (2003)
