= William Edwin Self =

American actor and producer (1921–2010)

- Born: June 21, 1921; Dayton, Ohio, U.S.
- Died: November 15, 2010 (aged 89); Los Angeles, California, U.S.
- Occupations: Actor; director; producer
- Years active: 1945–2012
- Spouse: Margaret Flynn (1941–2007) (her death)
- Children: Two
- Father: Edwin B. Self

William Edwin Self (June 21, 1921 – November 15, 2010) was an American television and film producer who began his career as an actor.

== Early life and education ==
The son of playwright and advertising executive Edwin B. Self, William Edwin Self was born at Miami Valley Hospital in Dayton, Ohio. During his youth, he lived in Dayton, Akron, Chicago, and Milwaukee. He graduated from Dayton's Roosevelt High School in 1939.

Self's father worked as an Advertising Manager at the Dayton Rubber Manufacturing Company, Akron Rubber Company, Miller Brewing Company, and Joseph Schlitz Brewing Company. Edwin Self wrote a novel, Limbo City (1949), and at least three plays which opened on Broadway: Junk (1927) starring Sydney Greenstreet, Two Strange Women(1933), and The Distant City (1941). His play, The Lady and the Clown, starring Estelle Winwood, opened in 1944 at the Civic Theatre in Chicago with William Self playing a small part. Edwin and Elizabeth (Elsie) Fundus Self, a homemaker, had two children: William and Jean LaVerne Self (later Bright).

From childhood, Self had "enthusiasms," keen interests that started when he was young and had continued throughout his life. Some of these interests had resulted in important connections and personal friendships. Self's fascination with Rudolph Valentino, for example, began when he was only five years old and his sister took him to see The Son of the Sheik (1926). Self had said that because his sister told him that Valentino had just died, he expected to see the movie idol in his casket on screen. Valentino stayed in Self's mind. He saw all the movies and read all the books he could find. As an adult, he became friends with Valentino's personal manager, George Ullman; one of Valentino's best friends, Robert Florey; as well as with Valentino's brother, Alberto.

It was also show business that led Self to become an accomplished tennis player. In 1932, age eleven, his parents took him to New York to see a Broadway production of Show Boat. Self's father pointed out tennis champion Bill Tilden in the lobby, telling him that Tilden was the greatest living tennis player. Self did not know anything about tennis, but he was impressed. He asked Tilden to sign his program. Back in Dayton, Self bought Tilden's book, Match Play and the Spin of the Ball, and talked his parents into purchasing him a tennis racket. With time, he would become runner-up in the Wisconsin Junior Tennis Championship, represent Wisconsin on the Junior Davis Cup team and, in 1945, win The Wisconsin State Men's Championship. Self played Varsity tennis at the University of Chicago and in his Senior Year was elected Captain of the team. When he came to Los Angeles in 1944, as an unknown and untried actor, his skill at tennis allowed him to make important contacts. He regularly played with Spencer Tracy, Katharine Hepburn, Charlie Chaplin, and Jack L. Warner, among other Hollywood notables. He also became friends with and played Bill Tilden.

One of Self's favorite hobbies was magic. When he was thirteen years old, he won a citywide contest, mounted by the renowned magician Howard Thurston and his traveling show, to name "Dayton's Best Amateur Magician and the Person Most Likely to Become Thurston's Successor." The contest was limited to children thirteen and under. Being the winner, Self appeared at the Colonial Theatre on the stage with Mr. Thurston to perform his trick. Although he had never before performed this trick in public (a fact he had left out on his contest application), it went off perfectly. Self's photograph was taken with Thurston and a notice appeared in a Dayton newspaper. He was friends with some of the best-known magicians and magic historians in the United States, and attended many of the major magic conventions. For many years, he was a member of The Magic Castle, a professional magician's club in Hollywood. In later years he became a close friend of Howard Thurston's daughter, Jane, who had appeared on stage with her father.

Another film that sparked a lifelong interest was Annie Oakley (1936), which starred Barbara Stanwyck. Self was fifteen years old when he saw the movie at the Keith Theatre in Dayton. Annie Oakley's brother, who lived in nearby Greenville, Ohio, had lent some of his Oakley memorabilia for display in the lobby. The film and the memorabilia fired Self's imagination, and his fascination with Oakley and Buffalo Bill Cody took root. He looked up Oakley's brother in Greenville and the two became friends. He also started writing an Oakley biography. To research this project, Self, age seventeen, persuaded his family to travel to Cody, Wyoming, so that Self could study the Oakley scrapbooks in the small log structure which housed the Buffalo Bill Museum. He also persuaded the museum's founder and curator, Mary Jester Allen (Buffalo Bill's niece), to name him Assistant Historian. Self had letterhead stationery and business cards printed with this title, although he never did anything in the position. The book was never published, but Self went on to serve on the Board of Trustees of the Buffalo Bill Historical Center: the five-museum, five-football-fields-sized outgrowth of the original institution. Many of Oakley's grandnieces and nephews were his friends.

While in high school, he decided to take up acting. In 1938, he appeared in Roosevelt High's Junior Class play, and in 1939 he was cast in the leading role of the Senior Class play, The Eyes of Tlaloc by Agnes Emelie Peterson. He also worked behind the scenes as electrician and stage manager. Self's drama teacher, Bertha May Johns, was a great inspiration to him as well as to her other students.

Self gave up drama while at the University of Chicago, thinking he should devote himself to more serious pursuits. While there, he joined Phi Kappa Psi fraternity. He graduated from Chicago in 1943 with a bachelor's degree in Political Science.

== Career ==
Self graduated from the University of Chicago in 1943 before traveling to Los Angeles to be an actor. His first film role was Private Gawky Henderson in The Story of G.I. Joe (1945) directed by William Wellman. Self also appeared in four films directed by Howard Hawks, including Red River (1948) and the science fiction cult classic, The Thing from Another World (1951). Between 1945 and 1952, he appeared in over thirty films.

In 1952, Self left acting to launch a lifelong career in television production. His first producing credit was Assistant to the Producer on the series China Smith starring Dan Duryea. From 1952 until 1956, Self was acting-producer (billed as Associate Producer) and then Producer of the Schlitz Playhouse of Stars. During this period, he produced two-hundred-eight half-hour episodes at fifty-two episodes per year. Many notable actors appeared as guest stars including Anthony Quinn, Peter Lorre, Vincent Price, Walter Brennan, Ronald Reagan, Rod Steiger, Charles Bronson, and James Dean.

Self moved on to produce The Frank Sinatra Show in 1957. Later that year, he accepted the post of Program Executive for CBS Television Network where his assignment was to develop new television series. The first pilot he produced was Rod Serling's The Twilight Zone.

Self was hired in 1959 by 20th Century Fox where he remained for 15 years. During this period, Self piloted Fox television from near-extinction to become one of the top suppliers of television programming in the business. In 1966, Fox had more television hours on the air than any other supplier. Significant among Fox series were Peyton Place (1964–1969), the first prime time soap-opera; Batman (1966–1968), the first series based on a comic book to air in Prime Time; Julia (1968–1971), the first weekly television series to star an African American woman; and the enduring classic M*A*S*H (1972–1983). Other notable Fox series of the time included Daniel Boone (1964–1969), Twelve O'Clock High (1964–1967), Voyage to the Bottom of the Sea (1964–1968), Lost in Space (1965–1968), The Green Hornet (1966–1967), The Monroes (1966 TV series) (1966–1967), The Ghost & Mrs. Muir (1968–1970), Land of the Giants (1968–1970), and Room 222 (1969–1972).

Self's talents were rewarded by the studio as he was promoted progressively from his original position of Executive Producer/Twentieth Century Fox Television (1962) to Vice-president/Twentieth Century Fox Television (1964) to President/Twentieth Century Fox Television (1968), and finally to Vice-president/Twentieth Century Fox Corporation.

Self left Fox in 1975 to partner with Mike Frankovich in the development and production of television and feature films. Although the partnership lasted just a little over a year, Frankovich/Self produced two feature films. These were The Shootist (1976), John Wayne's last film, and From Noon Till Three (1976) starring Charles Bronson.

Self returned to CBS in 1977 as Vice-president/Head of the West Coast. A year later, he took on a new challenge when he accepted the position of Vice President in Charge of Television Movies and Mini-Series, also for CBS. Before leaving this job in 1982, he supervised production of about fifty films and three or four mini-series per year. These included The Corn is Green (1979) starring Katharine Hepburn; All Quiet on the Western Front (1979) starring Ernest Borgnine and Richard Thomas; Guyana Tragedy (1980) starring Powers Boothe; Playing For Time (1980) starring Vanessa Redgrave; The Bunker (1981) starring Anthony Hopkins; Bill (1981) starring Mickey Rooney and Dennis Quaid; The Hunchback of Notre Dame (1982) starring Anthony Hopkins; and The Blue and the Gray (1982), an American Civil War mini-series which gained four prime-time Emmy nominations.

Self returned to the feature film in 1982 when he was made President of CBS Theatrical Film Production. He served in this capacity for three years, supervising the making of ten movies including Target (1985) directed by Arthur Penn and starring Gene Hackman and Matt Dillon; Eleni (1985) directed by Peter Yates and starring Kate Nelligan and John Malkovich; Better Off Dead (1985) with John Cusack; and Turtle Diary (1985) starring Glenda Jackson and Ben Kingsley.

In 1985, when CBS decided to leave the feature film business, Self established the independent William Self Productions to develop both television and feature films. In partnership with Norman Rosemont, Self produced The Tenth Man (1988) for the Hallmark Hall of Fame. It starred Anthony Hopkins, Kristin Scott Thomas, and Derek Jacobi. He also partnered with Glenn Close in producing three television movies for Hallmark: Sarah, Plain and Tall (1991), Skylark (1993), and Sarah, Plain and Tall: Winter's End (1999), all starring Glenn Close and Christopher Walken. Sarah, Plain and Tall received the highest rating of any Hallmark Hall of Fame to that date.

== Personal life ==
Self married Margaret Lucille Flynn of Spokane, Washington, his college sweetheart, in 1941, a union which lasted until her death in 2007. Self had two children, Edwin and Barbara. He was a member of the Academy of Television Arts and Sciences, the Academy of Motion Picture Arts and Sciences, and the Directors Guild of America. He had been involved in non-profit work for many years, serving on the Board of Trustees of the John Tracy Clinic, the Motion Picture and Television Fund, and the Buffalo Bill Historical Center in Cody, Wyoming.

Self died on November 15, 2010, at the Ronald Reagan UCLA Medical Center after suffering a heart attack four days earlier.

== Filmography ==
=== As actor ===
- The Story of G.I. Joe (1945) - Pvt. Cookie Henderson (uncredited)
- Decoy (1946) - Station Attendant (uncredited)
- Monsieur Verdoux (1947) - Max - a Reporter (uncredited)
- A Likely Story (1947) - Intern (uncredited)
- Kilroy Was Here (1947) - Murdock
- Marshal of Cripple Creek (1947) - Dick Lambert
- Homecoming (1948) - Lieutenant (uncredited)
- A Foreign Affair (1948) - Soldier (uncredited)
- Red River (1948) - Sutter - Wounded Wrangler (uncredited) (Credited as Billie Self)
- Adventure in Baltimore (1949) - Townsman (uncredited)
- The Great Gatsby (1949) - Collegian (uncredited)
- I Was a Male War Bride (1949) - Sergeant with War Bride (uncredited)
- Father Was a Fullback (1949) - Willie Davis (uncredited)
- Battleground (1949) - K Company G.I. (uncredited)
- Adam's Rib (1949) - Benjamin Klausner - Jury Foreman (uncredited)
- Sands of Iwo Jima (1949) - Pvt. L.D. Fowler Jr.
- Malaya (1949) - Henchman (uncredited)
- A Ticket to Tomahawk (1950) - Telegrapher (uncredited)
- Three Secrets (1950) - Sergeant (uncredited)
- Breakthrough (1950) - Pvt. George Glasheen
- Operation Pacific (1951) - Helmsman (uncredited)
- The Thing from Another World (1951) - Cpl. Barnes
- The People Against O'Hara (1951) - Narcotics Squad Technician (uncredited)
- Deadline - U.S.A. (1952) - Bellamy (uncredited)
- Pat and Mike (1952) - Pat Pemberton's Caddy
- Washington Story (1952) - Johnny (uncredited)
- The Big Sky (1952) - Boatman (uncredited)
- Plymouth Adventure (1952) - Sailor (uncredited)
- Battle Circus (1953) - Helicopter Pilot (uncredited) (final film role)

=== As film producer ===
- Ride the High Iron - (1956)
- The Shootist - (1975)
- From Noon Till Three - (1976)

=== As television producer ===
- Schlitz Playhouse of Stars (208 episodes between 1953 and 1956)
- The Frank Sinatra Show (ABC) (1957 and 1958)
- Adventures in Paradise (3 episodes in 1960 and 1961)
- The Time Tunnel (30 episodes in 1966 and 1967)
- The Green Hornet (26 episodes in 1966 and 1967)
- On The Run (1966 Unaired Pilot Starring Jan & Dean)
- The Ghost & Mrs. Muir (1968–70)
- Emergency! (TV Series 1972–1979) (65 episodes)- IMDb
- State Fair (1976)
- The Tenth Man (1988)
- Sarah, Plain and Tall (1991)
- Skylark (1993)
- Sarah, Plain and Tall: Winter's End (1999)
- Voyage to the Bottom of the Sea

=== As director ===
- The Secret (1954: Season 4, Episode 1 of The Schiltz Playhouse of Stars)
- The Last Out (1955: Season 5, Episode 1 of The Schiltz Playhouse of Stars)
- The Careless Cadet (1955: Season 5, Episode 9 of The Schiltz Playhouse of Stars)
- The Night They Won the Oscar (1956: Season 6, Episode 7 of The Schiltz Playhouse of Stars)
