= Małgorzata Zajączkowska =

Polish actress (born 1956)

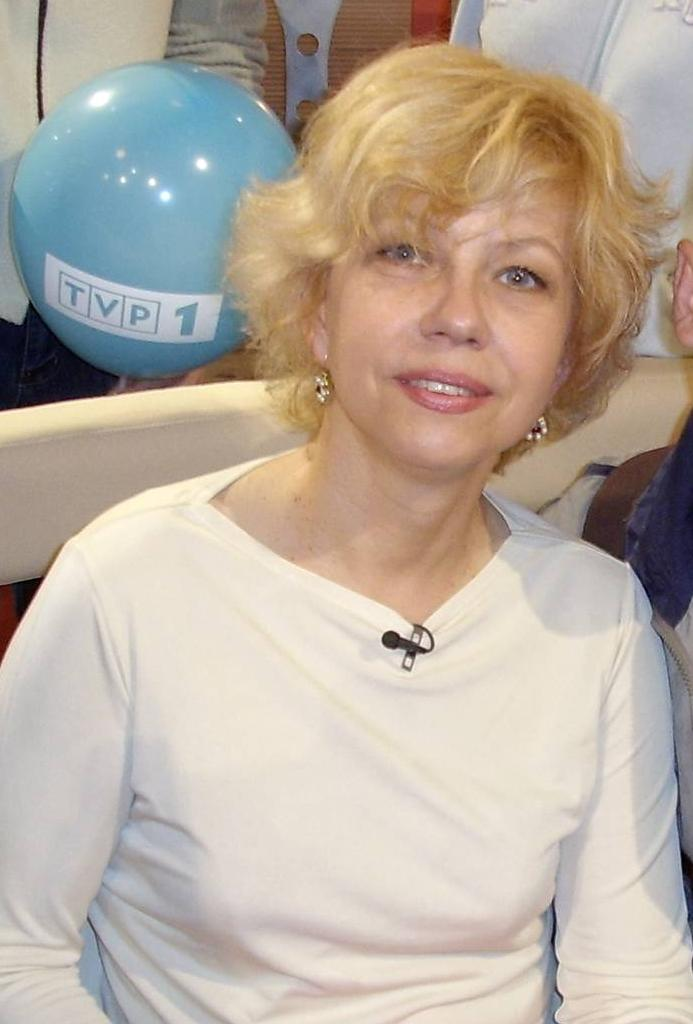
- Zajaczkowska in 2006
- Born: January 31, 1956 (age 70); Warsaw, Poland
- Other name: Margaret Sophie Stein

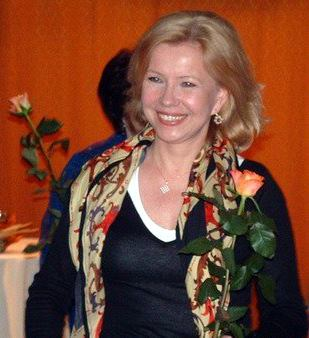
Małgorzata Zajączkowska

Małgorzata Zajączkowska (born January 31, 1956), also known as Margaret Sophie Stein, is a Polish actress. Beginning in 1979, she acted on stage in the Teatr Narodowy. In 1981, Zajączkowska moved to the United States and, adopting the stage name Margaret Sophie Stein, continued her acting career in television and film. She played Corvina Lang in the ABC daytime soap opera, All My Children from 1994 to 1995, and appeared in movies including Enemies, A Love Story (1989), Bullets Over Broadway (1994), and Simply Irresistible (1999). In 1996, Zajączkowska made her Broadway debut playing Miss Erikson in Present Laughter.

In 1999, Zajączkowska returned to Poland and continued acting there in films and television. She has also lectured at the Warsaw Film School. Her later notable credits include playing Nina Einhorn in the 2005 drama film Nina's Journey, and starring alongside Karen Gillan in the 2023 comedy-drama film, Late Bloomers.

== Filmography ==
Outside of Poland

- Late Bloomers (2023) as Antonina
- Ninas resa (2005) as Fru Pelikan
- Simply Irresistible (1999) as Mrs. Mueller
- A Will of Their Own (1998) as Mrs. Krakowski
- All My Children (1994–1995) as Corvina Lang
- Bullets Over Broadway (1994) as Lili
- Seasons of the Heart (1994)
- Skylark (1993) as Maggie
- Sarah, Plain and Tall (1991) as Maggie Grant
- Enemies, A Love Story (1989) as Yadwiga
- Balles perdues (1983) as Lucienne
- Danton (1983) as Servante Duplay
- From a Far Country (1981)

Polish

- My Wonderful Life (2021)
- Blindness (2016)
- Walesa. Man of Hope (2013) as Shop assistant
- Teraz albo nigdy! (2008) as Anna Bosz
- Ekipa (2007) as Foreign minister
- Magda M. (2005–2006) as Halina Czerska
- Złotopolscy (2004–2009) as Magdalena Ordyńska-Złotopolska
- Wszyscy jesteśmy Chrystusami (2006) as Nurse
- Pensjonat pod Różą (2004) as Teresa Białkowska
- Lokatorzy (2004) as Zofia
- Tak czy nie? (2003) as Anna
- Pogoda na jutro (2003) as Renata Kozioł
- Na dobre i na złe (2002–2003, 2009) as Irena Kozioł
- Psie serce (2002) as Misia
- Więzy krwi (2001) as Danuta
- Żółty szalik (2000)
- Sukces (2000) as Wanda Szarecka
- Miasteczko (2000) as Psychologist
- Epitafium dla Barbary Radziwillówny (1983) as Bogna
- Dziecinne pytania (1981) as Girl
- Bo oszalalem dla niej (1980) as Alina
- Constans (1980) as Grażyna
- Bez miłości (1980) as Marianna Skoczek
- Zdjecia próbne (1977) as Girl at screen tests (uncredited)

== Theatre ==
Performances
Play (Year)	Role	Theatre
Matematyka miłości [Mathematics of love] (2007)	Muszka	Krakowski Teatr Scena STU Kraków
Kobiety w sytuacji krytycznej [Women in a critical situation] (2007)		Teatr Polonia Warszawa
Spiewannaalkestis.pl (2005)	Mojra	Videoteatr "Poza" Warszawa
Kocham O'Keeffe [Alfred Stieglitz Loves O'Keeffe] (2005)	Georgia O'Keeffe	Kino-Teatr "Bajka" Warszawa
Upadek [Collapse] (2002)		Teatr Atelier im. Agnieszki Osieckiej Sopot
Panienka z Tacny [Lady from Tacny] (2000)	Amelia	Teatr na Woli im. Tadeusza Łomnickiego Warszawa
Miłość – to takie proste [Love – it's that simple] (1999)	Hedda	Teatr na Woli im. Tadeusza Łomnickiego Warszawa
And the Decameron (1980)	Olendria	Teatr Narodowy Warszawa
Sekret wróżki [The secret of fairies] (1980)	Koleżanka Wiedźma	Teatr Narodowy Warszawa
Obora [Cowshed] (1980)	Towarzyszka Berta	Teatr Narodowy Warszawa
School for Wives (1979)	Anusia	Teatr Narodowy Warszawa
Treny [Lamentations] (1979)		Teatr Narodowy Warszawa
The Brothers Karamazov by Dostoyevsky (1979)	Liza	Teatr Narodowy Warszawa
Dziady. Część III. Ustęp [Dziady. Part III. Paragraph] ] (1978)	Ewa	Teatr Narodowy Warszawa
