= Miracle Child (film) =

1993 American drama TV film

- Title card
- Genre: Drama
- Based on: Miracle at Clement's Pond by Patricia Pendergraft
- Written by: Gerald Di Pego
- Directed by: Michael Pressman
- Starring: Crystal Bernard; Cloris Leachman; John Terry; Graham Sack; Grace Zabriskie; George D. Wallace; Lexi Randall; Gary Grubbs; Barnard Hughes; Bekka Allen; Rick Galloway; Thomas C. Chapman; John Archie; Brett Cipes
- Theme music composer: Craig Safan
- Country of origin: United States
- Original language: English

Production
- Executive producer: Steve White
- Producer: Barry Bernardi
- Cinematography: Mark Irwin
- Editor: Millie Moore
- Running time: 100 minutes
- Production companies: Steve White Productions; Walt Disney Television

Original release
- Network: NBC
- Release: April 6, 1993

Miracle Child is a 1993 American made-for-television drama film based on the novel Miracle at Clement's Pond by Patricia Pendergraft. It was filmed in Archer, Florida and featured historic homes and churches in and around Archer. It was produced by Steve White Productions. It is part of the Disney Family Classics line.

== Plot ==
A despairing young widow (Crystal Bernard) who abandons her baby at pond-side among bulrushes and a traveling man (John Terry) who's fighting to reclaim his own son (Graham Sack) are drawn together. A baby plops out of a rainy, stormy sky into the arms of the town's beloved, vaguely addled spinster (Grace Zabriskie). Miracles suddenly reverse the fortunes of the town as drought and unemployment disappear, only to be replaced by boosterism and greed.

== Cast ==
- Crystal Bernard as Lisa Porter
- Cloris Leachman as Doc Betty
- John Terry as Buck Sanders
- Graham Sack as Lyle Sanders
- Grace Zabriskie as Adeleine Newberry
- George D. Wallace as Grandpa
- Lexi Randall as Taffy Marshall
- Gary Grubbs as John Marshall
- Barnard Hughes as Judge
- Bekka Allen as Willa Mrshall
- Rick Galloway as English
- Ryk O. aka Dick Ochampaugh as Cueball
- Thomas C. Chapman as Old Jack
- John Archie as Sherriff Peak (sic)
- Brett Cipes as The Whittler
- Rocky Essex as Painter
