= Baby (MacLachlan novel) =

1995 children's novel by Patricia MacLachlan

- Author: Patricia MacLachlan
- Publisher: Delacorte Books for Young Readers
- Publication date: September 1, 1993
- ISBN: 978-0-385-31133-5

Baby is a 1995 children's novel by American author Patricia MacLachlan. It explores the themes of family and abandonment through the story of a family who has experienced loss, but discovers a baby girl left on their doorstep, with the only information about her on a short note. The story is told from the perspective of a girl named Larkin, whose family discovers and cares for the baby. The book features and references several poems, including one by Edna St. Vincent Millay.

It was adapted into a 2000 TV movie directed by Robert Allan Ackerman and starring Farrah Fawcett, Keith Carradine, and Jean Stapleton.

== Reception ==
The Horn Book Magazine noted that the age of the book's intended audience was unclear but that it should still be read. The Bulletin of the Center for Children's Books called it an "excellent selection for early chapter book readers". The International Reader's Association put it on its 1994 list of books good for teaching. Booklist also reviewed the book.
