= University of Findlay's Mazza Museum =

Art museum in Ohio, United States

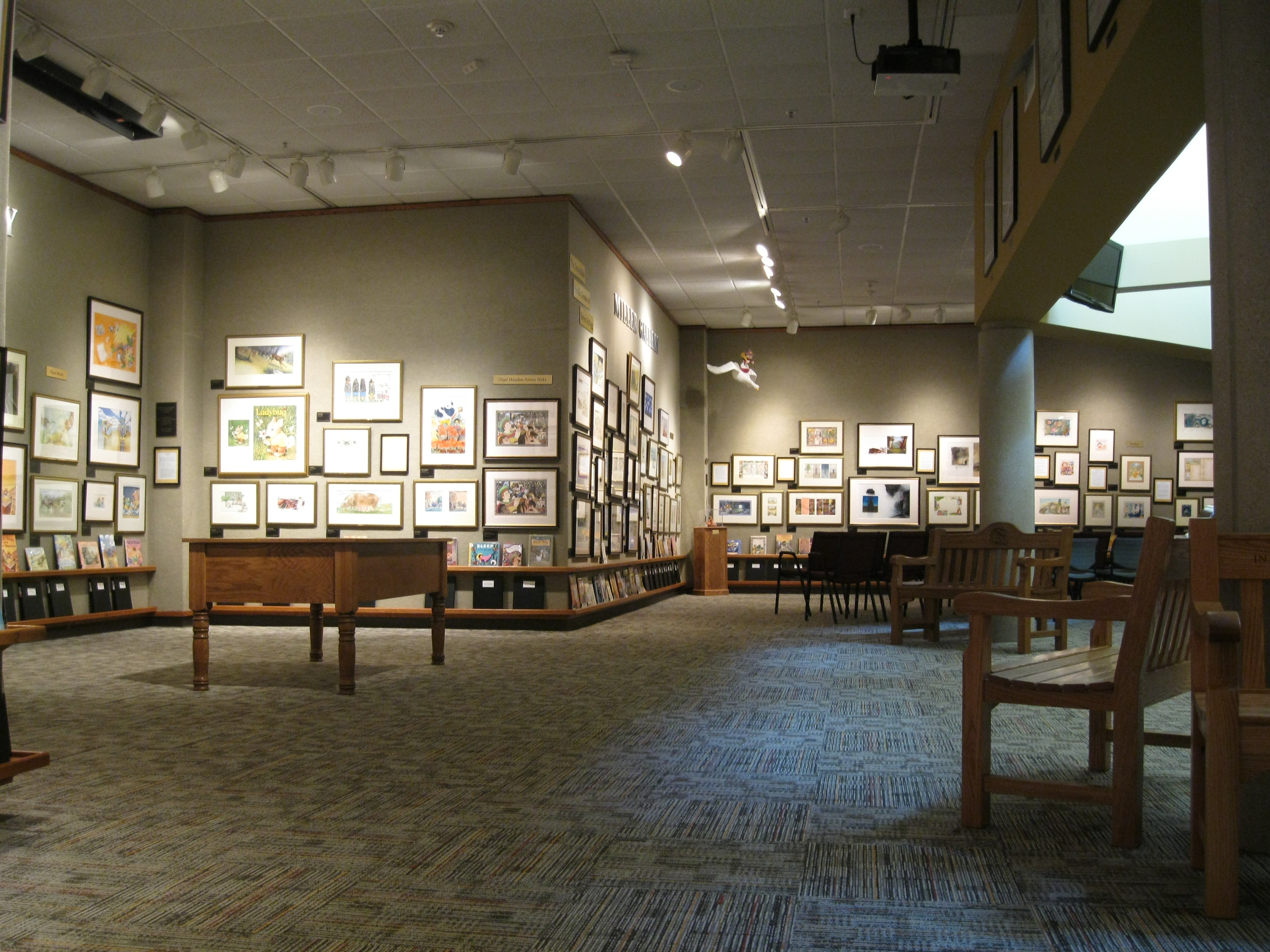
- Established: 1982
- Location: The University of Findlay; Findlay, Ohio, USA
- Coordinates: 41°03′13″N 83°39′12″W
- Director: Benjamin E. Sapp
- Curator: Dan Chudzinski
- Website: www.mazzamuseum.org

The University of Findlay's Mazza Museum, formerly the Mazza Museum of International Art from Picture Books, is an art museum located at The University of Findlay in Findlay, Ohio. It is devoted to illustrations from children's picture books.

== History ==
The museum dates from the 100th anniversary of Findlay College in 1982. Each academic division in the school was given $2,000 to create a special event for the year. Dr. Jerry Mallett in the Teacher Education division proposed starting a collection of children's book artwork and periodically bringing an important creator of children's books to speak. "I thought it would be nice to have something, not just for that year, but something permanent that would benefit the institution, the community and our majors on a permanent basis."

Expenses quickly surpassed the $2,000 grant but a donation by Findlay alumni August and Aleda Mazza allowed the museum to be established.

In 2017, the museum held an exhibition at the National Academy of Sciences in Washington DC featuring artwork from their collection that featured science and math.

A "mini" Mazza Museum opened in 2019 at the Toledo Zoo, located on the second floor of the ProMedica Museum of Natural History, and features nature, animal and zoo-themed art from picture books.

A PBS documentary premiered in November 2022, showcasing the 40-year history of the museum. The Magic of Mazza was created by WBGU-PBS.

== Collection ==
The Mazza Museum has grown from four pieces valued at $1,700 to more than 18,000 original illustrations. It has hosted over 300 book artists, authors and experts. The museum's collection includes original works by Steven Kellogg, Patricia Polacco, Ted Rand, Jan Brett, Eric Carle, Theodor Geisel (Dr. Seuss), Tomie dePaola, Tomi Ungerer, Willi Glasauer, Hans Wilhelm, and many others. Artists' honors include the Caldecott Medal, the Newbery Medal, the Golden Kite Award, and the Kate Greenaway Medal.

== Affiliation ==
The University of Findlay offers a Bachelor of Arts degree with an academic major in Children's Book Illustration. Students awarded this degree complete an internship at the Mazza Museum.
