= National Children's Book and Literacy Alliance =

National Children's Book and Literacy Alliance (NCBLA) is an American non-profit organization that advocates on behalf of literacy, literature, and libraries for young people. It was founded in 1997 by Mary Brigid Barrett and other children's book authors and illustrators.

NCBLA serves as a nonpartisan advocate by creating and developing special projects and events that promote literacy, literature, libraries, and the arts. The group organized the production of the book Our White House: Looking In, Looking Out (ISBN 978-0763620677) in 2008, in collaboration with Candlewick Press and 108 children's book authors and illustrators.

The board of directors currently includes: Mary Brigid Barrett, Helen Kampion, Carol Greenwald, Susan Cooper, Nikki Grimes, Steven Kellogg, Daphne Kalmar, Patricia MacLachlan, Patricia McKissack, Grant Oliphant, Katherine Paterson, Jodi Rzeszotarski, and Barbara Scotto.
