= Skylark (novel) =

1994 children's novel by Patricia MacLachlan

- First hardcover edition
- Author: Patricia MacLachlan
- Language: English
- Genre: Children's novel
- Publisher: Harper & Row
- Publication place: United States
- Media type: Print (paperback)
- ISBN: 0-06-023328-1
- Preceded by: Sarah, Plain and Tall
- Followed by: Caleb's Story

Skylark is a historical children's novel by Patricia MacLachlan published in 1994. It is a sequel to the Newbery Medal-winning novel Sarah, Plain and Tall and follows the lives of the Witting family after Sarah Wheaton arrives. It was adapted from a film with the same name.

== Plot overview ==
After Jacob and Sarah get married, a severe drought forces the family to make a drastic decision. With Jacob remaining on the farm, Anna and Caleb travel with Sarah to Maine to take refuge from the drought. The journey teaches them that the power of family can transcend distance as they wait for the day when they can be reunited again.
