= Sarah, Plain and Tall (film) =

1991 television film by Glenn Jordan

- Video release poster
- Based on: Sarah, Plain and Tall by Patricia MacLachlan
- Screenplay by: Patricia MacLachlan; Carol Sobieski
- Directed by: Glenn Jordan
- Starring: Glenn Close; Christopher Walken
- Composer: David Shire
- Country of origin: United States
- Original language: English

Production
- Executive producers: William Self; Glenn Close
- Producer: Glenn Jordan
- Cinematography: Mike Fash
- Editor: John Wright
- Running time: 98 minutes
- Production companies: Hallmark Hall of Fame Productions; Self Productions; Trillium Productions

Original release
- Network: CBS
- Release: February 3, 1991

Sarah, Plain and Tall is an American drama television film that premiered on CBS on February 3, 1991, as part of the Hallmark Hall of Fame anthology series. It is directed and produced by Glenn Jordan from a teleplay by Patricia MacLachlan and Carol Sobieski, based on the book of the same name by MacLachlan. It stars Glenn Close, who also serves as an executive producer, and Christopher Walken. It tells the story of Sarah Wheaton, a Maine spinster who goes to Kansas in the early 1900s in response to widower Jacob Witting's newspaper advertisement seeking a wife.

The film was nominated for nine Primetime Emmy Awards, including Outstanding Drama/Comedy Special and Miniseries, winning one for Outstanding Picture Editing for a Special. It also received two Golden Globe Award nominations, for Best Miniseries or Television Movie and Best Actress in a Miniseries or Television Movie for Close. It was followed by two sequels, Skylark and Sarah, Plain and Tall: Winter's End.

== Plot ==
The story is set in Kansas in 1910. Jacob Witting is a widowed farmer who is still saddened by the death of his wife, Katherine, during childbirth six years before. Since then, the task of taking care of his farm and two children, Anna and Caleb, is too difficult for him to handle alone. He advertises in the newspaper for a mail-order bride. Sarah Wheaton of Maine responds describing herself as "plain and tall". She travels to Kansas to become his wife.

Upon arriving, Sarah proves to have good sense, an interest in helping with even the most physically demanding chores, and a quiet, warm personality. But she grows homesick because miles and miles of Kansas farmland prove no substitute for Maine's ocean vistas. She is under no obligation to marry Jacob and is free to leave if she so desires; much of the story's suspense depends on whether or not she will decide to stay.

== Cast ==
- Glenn Close as Sarah Witting
- Christopher Walken as Jacob Witting
- Lexi Randall as Anna Witting
- Margaret Sophie Stein as Maggie Grant
- Jon DeVries as Matthew Grant
- Christopher Bell as Caleb Witting
- James Rebhorn as William Wheaton
- Woody Watson as Jess Stearns
- Betty Laird as Mrs. Parkley
- Marc Penney as Ticket Agent
- Kara Beth Taylor as Rose

== Reception ==
=== Critical response ===
On the review aggregator website Rotten Tomatoes, 80% of 5 critics' reviews are positive, with an average rating of 7.7/10. John J. O'Connor of The New York Times praised the story for "the kind of clean, simple line that television handles most skillfully", but opined that it "proceeds charmingly to a conclusion that is far from surprising." O'Connor concluded his review by writing, "Sarah, Plain and Tall delivers an affecting portrait of that rare phenomenon in popular mythology: the good stepmother." Scott D. Pierce of the Deseret News stated that the film "deals with emotions - love, loss, loneliness, yearning - on a very mature level" and called it "a television treasure." Patricia Brennan of The Washington Post described it as "a beautifully filmed story set at the turn of the century in the Kansas farmlands."

=== Audience viewership ===
According to Nielsen ratings, the film was the top-rated program of the week, attracting viewers in about 21.5 million homes.

=== Accolades ===
Year	Award	Category	Recipient(s)	Result	Ref.
1991	43rd Primetime Emmy Awards	Outstanding Drama/Comedy Special and Miniseries	Glenn Close, Glenn Jordan, William Self & Edwin Self	Nominated	
1991	43rd Primetime Emmy Awards	Outstanding Lead Actor in a Miniseries or a Special	Christopher Walken	Nominated	
1991	43rd Primetime Emmy Awards	Outstanding Lead Actress in a Miniseries or a Special	Glenn Close	Nominated	
1991	43rd Primetime Emmy Awards	Outstanding Directing in a Miniseries or a Special	Glenn Jordan	Nominated	
1991	43rd Primetime Emmy Awards	Outstanding Writing in a Miniseries or a Special	Patricia MacLachlan & Carol Sobieski	Nominated	
1991	43rd Primetime Emmy Awards	Outstanding Editing for a Miniseries or a Special (Single Camera Production)	John Wright	Won	
1991	43rd Primetime Emmy Awards	Outstanding Sound Mixing for a Drama Miniseries or a Special	Robert W. Glass Jr., Jacob Goldstein, Grover B. Helsley & Richard Rogers	Nominated	
1991	43rd Primetime Emmy Awards	Outstanding Achievement in Costume Design for a Miniseries or a Special	Van Broughton Ramsey	Nominated	
1991	43rd Primetime Emmy Awards	Outstanding Art Direction for a Miniseries or a Special	Robert Checchi & Ed Wittstein	Nominated	
1992	49th Golden Globe Awards	Best Miniseries or Television Movie	Sarah, Plain and Tall	Nominated	
1992	49th Golden Globe Awards	Best Actress in a Miniseries or Television Movie	Glenn Close	Nominated	
