= In the Best Interest of the Children =

- Genre: Drama
- Teleplay by: Peter Nelson; Jud Kinberg
- Story by: Peter Nelson
- Directed by: Michael Ray Rhodes
- Starring: Sarah Jessica Parker; Sally Struthers; Lexi Randall; Gary Graham
- Music by: James Di Pasquale
- Country of origin: United States
- Original language: English

Production
- Executive producer: Michael Ray Rhodes
- Producer: Paul Freeman
- Cinematography: Richard Thorpe
- Editor: Randy Jon Morgan
- Running time: 96 minutes
- Production company: NBC Productions

Original release
- Network: NBC
- Release: February 16, 1992

In the Best Interest of the Children is a 1992 American made-for-television fact-based drama film starring Sarah Jessica Parker who plays a woman struggling with manic-depression while raising her five children. This leads to the children eventually being taken from her and put in foster care. The film originally premiered on NBC on Sunday, February 16, 1992.

The film was partially shot in Marengo, Iowa, roughly 30 miles west of Iowa City.

== Plot ==
The film opens with Callie Cain (Parker) leading her kids in singing along to John Denver's "Take Me Home, Country Roads" as she moves back to her hometown of Estherville, Iowa with her 4 young daughters (plus another baby on the way) and boyfriend Ray Jacobs (Hodges). Although Callie's brother John (Graham) and sister-in-law Wanda (Atkinson) attempt to help them, the abusive Ray (the father of youngest child Jason) has no interest in working, and Callie rebuffs Wanda's suggestion that she continue treatment for the bipolar disorder she suffers from. As a result, the family soon finds themselves living in poverty, with oldest child Jessi (Randall) forced to play mother to her younger sisters (Julie, Susan, and Cindy) and brother. A short time later, Ray leaves them and Callie continues on a downward spiral.

Sensing her sister in law has some serious problems, Wanda notifies the authorities, who send social worker Donna Evans (Barnes) to the house. After initially attempting to avoid her, Callie agrees to undergo treatment for her disorder, on the condition that John and Wanda don't get custody of her children, who are instead taken in by Patty and Harlan Pepper (Struthers and Johnston). Between the fact that the children are not only thriving in the Peppers' care, but also referring to them as "Mom" and "Dad", Patty soon becomes determined that she and Harlan win custody, particularly after seeing the effects that the children suffer after their required visits with Callie at the hospital. This results in a difficult legal battle, which drags on over a period of two years, and generates much media coverage over the legal system's apparent inability to act in the children's best interest.

Despite the couple's best efforts, after much consideration, the presiding judge rules that the children be removed from Patty and Harlan's care. After a tearful farewell that generates more media attention, the children are placed in the care of the state, during which time they begin receiving therapy. During one of these sessions, Julie expresses anger towards her older sister for things not working out, despite Jessi's promise that they would, and tells her she's "just like Callie". Later, Jessi tearfully tells her therapist that she tried her hardest, but was overwhelmed by the adult role she attempted to fill. Meanwhile, all is not well for Harlan and Patty, whose marriage is deteriorating as a result of the grief caused by the children's removal. In a subsequent therapy session, Jessi is joined by Callie, who attempts to explain the reasons for her past erratic behavior, but Jessi is still angry with her mother for everything that happened, and the session abruptly ends when Callie runs from the center. After this incident, she subsequently disappears, thus detouring the original plan of eventually returning the children to Callie. Nor is there an alternate workable plan, as the current foster placement is only short-term; Harlan and Patty have split, and the kids blame their Uncle John for having them removed.

Eventually finding Callie in the backseat of his truck, John makes a heartfelt plea for his sister to resume treatment, promising to care for her kids as if they were his own, and she finally agrees to do so. Callie then explains the situation to the kids, who ask why their Uncle John and Aunt Wanda never stepped in to help them before. At this point, Callie admits she refused to accept their help because of her illness, but assures the kids that the decision of where they will live is up to them. The younger children look to Jessi as to what they should do, but she snaps and tells them she doesn't know everything, and they should just take a vote. She then runs after her mother to wish her good luck, making an apparent peace with her. Callie later bids goodbye to her children as they leave with John and Wanda, whom they have decided to live with. The film ends in the same manner as it opened, with the children singing a rendition of "Take Me Home, Country Roads", eventually joined by their aunt and uncle.

== Epilogue ==
As a result of the public consciousness raised by the real-life Cain children's experience, the Iowa State Legislature subsequently enacted new laws regarding the rights of foster children. The children themselves were subsequently adopted by their aunt and uncle, and continued to visit their mother frequently, though she was still battling mental illness.

== Cast ==
- Sarah Jessica Parker as Callie Cain
- Sally Struthers as Patty Pepper
- Lexi Randall as Jessica Cain
- Gary Graham as John Birney
- Susan Barnes as Donna Evans
- Jayne Atkinson as Wanda Birney
- John Dennis Johnston as Harlan Pepper
- Tom Hodges as Ray Jacobs
- Elizabeth Ashley as Carla Scott
- Jessica Campbell as Julie Cain
- Lacey Guyon as Susan Cain
- Amanda Laughlin as Cindy Cain (age 5)
- Molly Laughlin as Cindy Cain (age 3)
- Matthew and Mitchell Cook as Jason Cain (age 3)
- Chase and Corey Johnson as Jason Cain (age 2)
- Milo Popp as Cousin Mark Birney
- Jeremy Hopkins as Cousin Bobby Birney
- Sonny and Alex Stinnet as Baby Jason Cain
- Harry Lennix as Tim Coffey
- Jane Lynch as Gwen Hatcher
- Kris Dougherty as Kris Dougherty
