= Lee Lawson =

American actress (1941–2022)

Lee Lawson (October 14, 1941 – May 22, 2022) was an American stage, soap opera and television actress, best-known as Bea Reardon in Guiding Light (1981–1990) and as Barbara Sterling in Love of Life. She also appeared on episodes of Maude and Kojak. Her last screen appearance came in an episode of the 1991 television series Reasonable Doubts. Lawson had six Broadway credits.

Lawson was born in New York City. After years of acting, Lawson earned a doctorate in clinical psychology and had a second career as a psychologist and crisis counselor. She was married to Joseph Bova and had three children.

She died in New York City on May 22, 2022, at age 80, of cancer and COVID-19.
