= Bruce L. Christensen =

American journalist (1943–2022)

- Born: April 26, 1943; Ogden, Utah, U.S.
- Died: November 18, 2022 (aged 79); Orem, Utah, U.S.
- Education: University of Utah (BA); Medill School of Journalism (MS)
- Occupation: Television executive
- Spouse: Barbara Lucille Decker

Bruce L. Christensen (April 26, 1943 – November 18, 2022) was an American television executive. He was the president of KSL-TV and senior vice president of Bonneville International Corporation, and earlier, president and CEO of the Public Broadcasting Service (PBS).

Christensen received his BA from the University of Utah and his MS in Journalism from the Medill School of Journalism at Northwestern University. Christensen began his career as a reporter working for KSL in 1965. Christensen later worked in relations for Brigham Young University (BYU), and then as general manager of the University of Utah's public TV and radio stations KUED and KUER-FM.

Christensen moved to Washington, D.C. to be the second president of the America's Public Television Stations and then became CEO of PBS, where he worked for nine years.

From 1993 to 2005 he was dean of the BYU College of Fine Arts and Communications.

Christensen was one of the original members of the board of Overseers for the Wheatley Institution at BYU.

Christensen was married to Barbara Lucille Decker. He was a Latter-day Saint and succeeded John S. Tanner as president of the BYU 4th Stake, from 1997 to 2002. Christensen died on November 18, 2022, at the age of 79.

== Sources ==
- bio from listing of Wheatley Institution board of Overseers
- Medill Hall of Achievement bio
- resolution thanking Christensen for his work with PBS
- "New stake presidencies", Church News, May 10, 1997
- "Dietician named to top post", Church News, Aug 6, 1994
