= Glenn Jordan =

American film director

- Born: April 5, 1936 (age 89); San Antonio, Texas, U.S.
- Occupation: Film director
- Years active: 1955–2003

Glenn Jordan (born April 5, 1936) is a retired American television director and producer.

Born in San Antonio, Texas, Jordan directed multiple episodes of Family and numerous television movies, several based on real persons as diverse as Benjamin Franklin, George Armstrong Custer, Lucille Ball, Christa McAuliffe, and Karen Ann Quinlan. His directing credits include small-screen adaptions of The Picture of Dorian Gray, Les Misérables, Hogan's Goat, Eccentricities of a Nightingale, The Women's Room, A Streetcar Named Desire, O Pioneers!, and A Christmas Memory. Additional television directing credits include Heartsounds, Botticelli, Sarah, Plain and Tall, To Dance with the White Dog, Barbarians at the Gate, The Long Way Home, Sarah, Plain and Tall: Winter's End, The Boys, and Jane's House.

Jordan directed three feature films: Only When I Laugh, The Buddy System, and Mass Appeal.

Jordan was nominated for thirteen Emmy Awards and won four, for producing the miniseries Benjamin Franklin, for producing and directing the Hallmark Hall of Fame production Promise, and for executive producing the HBO production Barbarians at the Gate. He won two New York area Emmys for the PBS series Actor's Choice and New York Television Theatre. He won the Directors Guild of America Award for Outstanding Directorial Achievement in a Dramatic Series for Family and was nominated for Outstanding Directorial Achievement in Specials or Movies for Television for Les Misérables. Three of his productions (Benjamin Franklin, Heartsounds, and Promise) have won Peabody Awards.
