= Sarah, Plain and Tall: Winter's End =

- Genre: Drama
- Based on: Caleb's Story by Patricia MacLachlan
- Written by: Patricia MacLachlan
- Directed by: Glenn Jordan
- Starring: Glenn Close; Christopher Walken; George Hearn; Lexi Randall; Christopher Bell; Emily Osment; Jack Palance
- Music by: David Shire
- Original language: English

Production
- Executive producers: Glenn Close; William Self; Richard Welsh
- Producer: Robert Bennett Steinhauer
- Cinematography: Ralf D. Bode
- Editor: Michael Brown
- Running time: 95 minutes

Original release
- Network: CBS
- Release: November 21, 1999

Related
- Sarah, Plain and Tall; Skylark

Sarah, Plain and Tall: Winter's End is a 1999 Hallmark Hall of Fame made-for-television drama film and is the third of three television films based on the series of children's books by Patricia MacLachlan: Sarah, Plain and Tall (1991) and its sequel Skylark (1993). Though they do not share a title, the events in the film Winter's End are taken from MacLachlan's book Caleb's Story, though in order to appeal to a more adult audience than the children's books, the events are expanded and the tone made slightly more serious. The film premiered on CBS on November 21, 1999.

== Plot ==
Sarah and Jacob Witting are on their farm with their family. Jacob's estranged father John reappears one winter, wanting to make amends with his son.

== Cast ==
- Glenn Close as Sarah Wheaton Witting - Second wife of Jacob, mother of Cassie, and stepmother of Anna and Caleb. She is a loving woman who is surprised at the arrival of her father-in-law John Witting but tries to help him rebuild his relationship with Jacob.
- Christopher Walken as Jacob Witting - husband of Sarah and Katherine (deceased) and father of Anna and Caleb from his first marriage to Katherine and Cassie from his marriage to Sarah. He is surprised at the arrival of his father John Witting who abandoned him as a child and holds a grudge against him for this.
- Jack Palance as John Witting - father of Jacob, father-in-law of Sarah and Katherine and grandfather of Anna, Caleb and Cassie. He abandoned Jacob when he was a child but returns in the movie to rebuild a relationship with his son. He owned the farm Jacob and Sarah live on.
- Emily Osment as Cassie Witting - Jacob's youngest child and Sarah's only child and the younger half-sister of Anna and Caleb. She loves to talk and sometimes gets into mischief. She is the first to discover that her grandfather John Witting had returned.
- Christopher Bell as Caleb Witting - Jacob's middle child and only son (from his first wife Catherine). He is the stepson of Sarah, the younger brother of Anna and the older half-brother of Cassie.
- Lexi Randall as Anna Witting - Jacob's oldest daughter (from his first wife Catherine), the stepdaughter of Sarah, older sister of Caleb and older half-sister of Cassie. She leaves home to be a nurse and has a boyfriend named Justin Hartley who is serving in World War I.
- George Hearn as Dr. Hartley - the doctor who Anna works for and the father of her boyfriend Justin who is serving in World War I.
- Calen Pick as Justin Hartley - son of Dr. Hartley and boyfriend of Anna Witting. He serves in World War I but returns home safely to Anna with a broken left arm. He writes her letters all the time while he's away. The actor who played Justin, Calen Pick, is the real-life nephew of Glenn Close, who plays Sarah.
