= Baby (2000 film) =

- Promotional poster
- Genre: Drama
- Written by: David Manson; Kerry Kennedy
- Directed by: Robert Allan Ackerman
- Starring: Farrah Fawcett; Keith Carradine
- Music by: Jeff Danna
- Country of origin: United States
- Original language: English

Production
- Executive producers: Glenn Close; David Manson
- Producers: Patricia MacLachlan; Beth Nathanson; Cyrus Yavneh
- Production location: Prospect, Nova Scotia
- Cinematography: Ronald Víctor García
- Editor: Melissa Kent
- Running time: 93 minutes
- Production company: Sarabande Productions

Original release
- Network: TNT
- Release: October 8, 2000

Baby is a 2000 American made-for-television drama film starring Farrah Fawcett, Keith Carradine and an early performance from Alison Pill. It is based on the 1995 novel of the same name. The film premiered on October 8, 2000 on TNT.

== Plot ==
A baby is left on the doorsteps at the Malones' house. The baby is left with a note (from its mother) saying that she'll return when the time is right. The Malones take the baby in and care for its as if were their own.

== Cast ==
- Farrah Fawcett as Lily Malone
- Keith Carradine as John Malone
- Jean Stapleton as Byrd
- Alison Pill as Larkin Malone
