= Patricia MacLachlan =

American children's writer (1938–2022)

- Born: Patricia Marie Pritzkau; March 3, 1938; Cheyenne, Wyoming, U.S.
- Died: March 31, 2022 (aged 84); Williamsburg, Massachusetts, U.S.
- Education: University of Connecticut
- Occupation: Writer
- Writing career
- Genres: Children's and young-adult novels, historical fiction
- Notable awards: Newbery Medal; 1986

Patricia Marie MacLachlan (née Pritzkau; March 3, 1938 – March 31, 2022) was an American children's writer. She was noted for her novel Sarah, Plain and Tall, which won the 1986 Newbery Medal.

== Early life ==
MacLachlan was born in Cheyenne, Wyoming, on March 3, 1938. Her father, Philo, was a professor of philosophy of education; her mother, Madonna, was an American English teacher before becoming a homemaker. Her family moved to Rochester, Minnesota, when she was five years old, then relocating to Connecticut after she completed elementary as well as middle school. MacLachlan later studied English at the University of Connecticut, graduating with a bachelor's degree in 1962.

== Career ==
MacLachlan first worked as an English teacher at Bennett Junior High School in Manchester, Connecticut from 1963 until 1979. She was also employed by a family services agency during this time. She then began writing at the age of 35, after her children started attending school. She published her first volume, The Sick Day, in 1979, with her first novel, Arthur, for the Very First Time, being released the following year. Six years later, she was awarded the Newbery Medal for her book Sarah, Plain and Tall. It was adapted as a TV movie by the same name in 1991, starring Glenn Close and Christopher Walken, with MacLachlan as one of its screenwriters. The two actors subsequently reprised their roles in the sequel Skylark two years later. Her novels Journey (1991) and Baby (1993) were also adapted for TV in 1995 and 2000, respectively.

MacLachlan ultimately authored over 60 children's books throughout her career. She collaborated with her daughter, Emily MacLachlan Charest, to create several picture books during the latter part of her career. These included Once I Ate a Pie (2006), Fiona Loves the Night (2007), I Didn't Do It (2010), Cat Talk (2013), and Little Robot Alone (2018). MacLachlan received a National Humanities Medal in 2002. She was a board member of the National Children's Book and Literacy Alliance, a national not-for-profit that actively advocates for literacy, literature, and libraries.

== Personal life ==
MacLachlan married Robert MacLachlan in 1962. They met while she was studying at the University of Connecticut, and remained married until his death in 2015. Together, they had three children: John, Emily, and Jamison. She resided in western Massachusetts and kept a small bag of dirt from the prairies to call to mind her Wyoming roots.

Patricia MacLachlan died on March 31, 2022, at her home in Williamsburg, Massachusetts. She was 84 years old.

== Novels ==
Sarah, Plain and Tall series, of the Witting family

- Sarah, Plain and Tall (1985) – winner of the 1986 Newbery Medal
- Skylark (1994) ISBN 978-0-06-023328-0
- Caleb's Story (2001) ISBN 978-0-06-023606-9
- More Perfect Than the Moon (2004) ISBN 978-0-06-027558-7
- Grandfather's Dance (2009) ISBN 978-1-4178-1868-6

=== Other ===
- Arthur, for the Very First Time (1980) ISBN 978-0-06-024045-5
- Through Grandpa's Eyes (1980) ISBN 978-0-06-024043-1
- Mama One, Mama Two (1982) ISBN 978-0-06-024082-0
- Tomorrow's Wizard (1982) ISBN 978-0-06-024074-5
- Cassie Binegar (1982) ISBN 978-0-06-024034-9
- Seven Kisses in a Row (1983) ISBN 978-0-06-024084-4
- Unclaimed Treasures (1987) ISBN 978-0-8124-8529-5
- The Facts and Fictions of Minna Pratt (1988) ISBN 978-0-06-024117-9
- Journey (1991) ISBN 978-0-385-30427-6
- Three Names (1991) ISBN 978-0-06-443360-0
- Baby (1993) ISBN 978-0-385-31133-5
- All the Places to Love (1994) ISBN 978-0-06-021098-4
- What You Know First (1995) ISBN 978-0-06-024413-2
- The Sick Day (2001) ISBN 978-0-385-90007-2
- Edward's Eyes (2007) ISBN 978-1-4391-5664-3
- True Gift: A Christmas Story (2009) ISBN 978-1-4391-5617-9
- Before You Came (2011) ISBN 978-0-06-051234-7
- Cat Talk (2013) ISBN 978-0-06-027979-0 (Illustrated by Barry Moser)
- Nora's Chicks (2013) ISBN 978-0-7636-4753-7 (Illustrated by Kathryn Brown)
- The Iridescence of Birds: A Book About Henri Matisse (2014) ISBN 978-1-59643-948-1
- The Truth of Me (2015) ISBN 978-0-06-199861-4
- Poets Dog (2018) ISBN 978-0-06-229265-0
- Wondrous Rex (2020) ISBN 978-0-06-294102-2
- Waiting for Magic (2012) ISBN 978-1-4169-2746-4
- White Fur Flying (2018) ISBN 978-1-4169-2746-4
- Dream Within a Dream (2020) ISBN 978-1-5344-2959-8
- My Life Begins (2022)
- Snow Horses: A First Night Story (2022) ISBN 978-1-5344-7355-3
- The boxcar children: the beginning
