= Skylark (1993 film) =

- VHS cover
- Genre: Drama
- Based on: Skylark by Patricia MacLachlan
- Written by: Patricia MacLachlan
- Directed by: Joseph Sargent
- Starring: Glenn Close; Christopher Walken; Lexi Randall; Christopher Bell; Margaret Sophie Stein; Jon DeVries
- Theme music composer: David Shire
- Country of origin: United States
- Original language: English

Production
- Executive producers: Glenn Close; William Self
- Producer: Joseph Sargent
- Production locations: Osage City, Kansas; Wichita, Kansas; Maine
- Cinematography: Mike Fash
- Editor: Michael Brown
- Running time: 95 minutes
- Production company: Hallmark Hall of Fame Productions

Original release
- Network: CBS
- Release: February 7, 1993

Related
- Sarah, Plain and Tall; Sarah, Plain and Tall: Winter's End

Skylark (also titled Skylark: The Sequel to Sarah, Plain and Tall) is a 1993 Hallmark Hall of Fame made-for-television drama film and is a sequel to Sarah, Plain and Tall (1991).

== Plot ==
The Witting farm is in trouble from a severe drought. Jacob and Sarah begin to wonder what will happen to the family if they have to leave the farm. Sarah decides to take the children Anna and Caleb to her hometown in Maine while Jacob stays at the farm to make sure it is safe and sound. When the family arrives in Maine, Anna and Caleb meet Sarah's family the Wheatons who completely fall in love with them. It is also there that Sarah reveals that she is pregnant.

== Cast ==
- Glenn Close as Sarah Wheaton Witting
- Christopher Walken as Jacob Witting
- Lexi Randall as Anna Witting
- Christopher Bell as Caleb Witting
- Jon DeVries as Matthew Grant
- Margaret Sophie Stein as Maggie Grant
- T. Max Graham as Photographer
- Tresa Hughes as Mattie Wheaton
- James Rebhorn as William Wheaton
- Lee Richardson as Chubbers Horatio
- Lois Smith as Lou Wheaton
- Woody Watson as Jess Stearns
- Elizabeth Wilson as Harriet Wheaton

== Sequel ==
It was followed by another sequel, Sarah, Plain and Tall: Winter's End.

== Release ==
It aired in 1993 on CBS as a Hallmark Hall of Fame film, and now is regularly shown on Hallmark Channel.

== Reception ==
Glenn Close was nominated for the 1993 Primetime Emmy for Outstanding Lead Actress in a Miniseries or Special at the 45th Primetime Emmy Awards.
