= Christopher Walken on stage and screen =

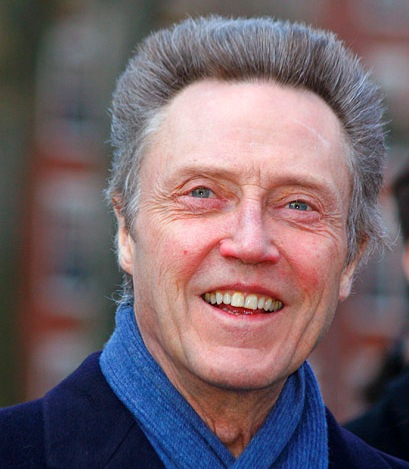
Walken in 2008

Christopher Walken is an American actor, whose career has spanned over 50 years with appearances in theater, film, and television. He has appeared in over 100 movies and television shows, including A View to a Kill, At Close Range, The Deer Hunter, King of New York, Batman Returns, Pulp Fiction, Sleepy Hollow, True Romance, and Catch Me If You Can, as well as music videos by recording artists such as Madonna and Fatboy Slim.

Walken's early career was primarily in theater and television where he often played small roles. During this period of his career, Walken was credited as "Ken Walken" and later as "Ronnie Walken", until he finally settled on "Christopher Walken". He began acting in films in 1969 and, after a series of increasingly larger roles, won an Academy Award in 1978 as Best Supporting Actor for his role in The Deer Hunter. Since then, Walken has become a highly sought-after actor, typically performing in numerous films every year.

Walken has been a primary character in two film franchises: as Gabriel the fallen angel in The Prophecy series, and as Jacob Witting in the made-for-television films based on Patricia MacLachlan's Sarah, Plain and Tall novels. Other notable roles include Johnny Smith in The Dead Zone, Captain Koons in Pulp Fiction, and Frank Abagnale Sr. in Catch Me If You Can. He also sings and dances, as seen in some of his films including: Pennies from Heaven, Romance & Cigarettes, and Hairspray.

== Film ==
Following his early (1950s) work in television and theater, Walken has acted primarily in films. This list includes credits in studio films, independent films, animated films, and television films. The list includes the 2001 short five-minute film Popcorn Shrimp which Walken wrote, produced and directed.

Year	Title	Role	Director	Notes
1966	Barefoot in Athens	Lamprocles	George Schaefer	
1969	Me and My Brother	The Director	Robert Frank	
1969	The Three Musketeers	John Felton	John Hirsch	
1971	The Anderson Tapes	The Kid	Sidney Lumet	
1972	The Happiness Cage	Private James H. Reese	Bernard Girard	
1975	Valley Forge	The Hessian	Fielder Cook	
1976	Next Stop, Greenwich Village	Robert	Paul Mazursky	
1977	Annie Hall	Duane Hall	Woody Allen	
1977	Roseland	Russell	James Ivory	
1977	The Sentinel	Detective Rizzo	Michael Winner	
1978	Shoot the Sun Down	"Mr. Rainbow"	David Leeds	
1978	The Deer Hunter	Nikanor "Nick" Chevotarevich	Michael Cimino	
1979	Last Embrace	Eckart	Jonathan Demme	
1980	Heaven's Gate	Nathan D. Champion	Michael Cimino	
1980	The Dogs of War	James "Jamie" Shannon	John Irvin	
1981	Pennies From Heaven	Tom	Herbert Ross	
1983	Brainstorm	Dr. Michael Anthony Brace	Douglas Trumbull	
1983	The Dead Zone	Johnny Smith	David Cronenberg	
1985	A View to a Kill	Max Zorin	John Glen	
1986	At Close Range	Brad Whitewood Sr.	James Foley	
1987	Deadline	Don Stevens	Nathaniel Gutman	
1988	Biloxi Blues	Technical Sergeant Merwin J. Toomey	Mike Nichols	
1988	Homeboy	Wesley Pendergass	Michael Seresin	
1988	Puss in Boots	Puss	Eugene Marner	
1988	The Milagro Beanfield War	Kyril Montana	Robert Redford	
1989	Communion	Louis Whitley Strieber	Philippe Mora	
1990	King of New York	Frank White	Abel Ferrara	
1990	The Comfort of Strangers	Robert	Paul Schrader	
1991	All-American Murder	P.J. Decker	Anson Williams	
1991	McBain	Bobby McBain	James Glickenhaus	
1992	Batman Returns	Max Shreck	Tim Burton	
1992	Day of Atonement	Pasco Meisner	Alexandre Arcady	
1992	Mistress	Warren Zell	Barry Primus	
1993	True Romance	Vincenzo Coccotti	Tony Scott	
1993	Wayne's World 2	Robert C. "Bobby" Cahn	Stephen Surjik	
1994	A Business Affair	Vanni Corso	Charlotte Brändström	
1994	Pulp Fiction	Captain Koons	Quentin Tarantino	
1995	Nick of Time	Mr. Smith	John Badham	
1995	Search and Destroy	Kim Ulander	David Salle	
1995	The Addiction	Peina	Abel Ferrara	
1995	The Prophecy	Gabriel	Gregory Widen	
1995	Things to Do in Denver When You're Dead	The Man With The Plan	Gary Fleder	
1995	Wild Side	Bruno Buckingham	Donald Cammell	
1996	Basquiat	The Interviewer	Julian Schnabel	
1996	Celluloide	US Officer Rod Geiger	Carlo Lizzani	
1996	Last Man Standing	Hickey	Walter Hill	
1996	The Funeral	Raimundo Tempio	Abel Ferrara	
1997	Excess Baggage	Ray Perkins	Marco Brambilla	
1997	Mouse Hunt	Caesar	Gore Verbinski	
1997	Suicide Kings	Carlo Bartolucci / Charlie Barret	Peter O'Fallon	
1997	Touch	Bill Hill	Paul Schrader	
1998	Antz	Colonel Cutter (voice)	Eric Darnell	
1998	Illuminata	Umberto Bevalaqua	John Turturro	
1998	New Rose Hotel	Fox	Abel Ferrara	Also co-producer
1998	The Prophecy II	Gabriel	Greg Spence	Direct-to-DVD
1998	Trance	Uncle Bill Ferriter	Michael Almereyda	
1999	Blast from the Past	Calvin Webber	Hugh Wilson	
1999	Kiss Toledo Goodbye	Max	Lyndon Chubbuck	
1999	Sleepy Hollow	Headless Horseman	Tim Burton	
1999	The Opportunists	Victor "Vic" Kelly	Myles Connell	
2000	The Prophecy 3: The Ascent	Gabriel	Patrick Lussier	Direct-to-DVD
2001	America's Sweethearts	Hal Weidmann	Joe Roth	
2001	Joe Dirt	Anthony Benedetti / Clem Doore / Gert B. Frobe	Dennie Gordon	
2001	Popcorn Shrimp		Christopher Walken	Short film; Also writer
2001	Scotland, PA	Lieutenant McDuff	Billy Morrissette	
2001	The Affair of the Necklace	Alessandro Cagliostro	Charles Shyer	
2002	Catch Me If You Can	Frank William Abagnale Sr.	Steven Spielberg	
2002	Engine Trouble	Rusty (voice)	Brad Barnes	Short film
2002	Poolhall Junkies	Uncle Mike Flynn	Mars Callahan	
2002	The Country Bears	Reed Thimple / Benny Bogswaggle	Peter Hastings	
2002	Undertaking Betty	Frank Featherbed	Nick Hurran	
2003	Gigli	Detective Stanley Jacobellis	Martin Brest	
2003	Kangaroo Jack	Salvatore "Sal" Maggio	David McNally	
2003	The Rundown	Cornelius Hatcher	Peter Berg	
2004	Around the Bend	Turner Lair	Jordan Roberts	
2004	Envy	"J-Man"	Barry Levinson	
2004	Man on Fire	Paul Rayburn	Tony Scott	
2004	The Stepford Wives	Mike Wellington	Frank Oz	
2005	Domino	Mark Heiss	Tony Scott	
2005	Romance & Cigarettes	Cousin Bo	John Turturro	
2005	Wedding Crashers	William Cleary	David Dobkin	
2006	Click	Morty	Frank Coraci	
2006	Fade to Black	Brewster	Oliver Parker	
2006	Man of the Year	Jack Menkan	Barry Levinson	
2007	Balls of Fury	Feng	Robert Ben Garant	
2007	Hairspray	Wilbur Turnblad	Adam Shankman	
2008	Five Dollars a Day	Nat Parker	Nigel Cole	
2009	The Maiden Heist	Roger Barlow	Peter Hewitt	
2011	Dark Horse	Jackie	Todd Solondz	
2011	Kill the Irishman	Alex "Shondor" Birns	Jonathan Hensleigh	
2012	A Late Quartet	Peter Mitchell	Yaron Zilberman	
2012	Life's a Beach	Roy Callahan	Tony Vitale	
2012	Seven Psychopaths	Hans Kieslowski / The Quaker	Martin McDonagh	
2012	Stand Up Guys	"Doc"	Fisher Stevens	
2013	Gods Behaving Badly	Zeus	Marc Turtletaub	
2013	The Power of Few	Doke	Leone Marucci	
2014	Jersey Boys	Angelo "Gyp" DeCarlo	Clint Eastwood	
2015	Joe Dirt 2: Beautiful Loser	Anthony Benedetti / Clem Doore / Gert B. Frobe	Fred Wolf	
2015	One More Time	Paul Francis Lippman / Paul Lombard	Robert Edwards	
2015	The Family Fang	Caleb Fang	Jason Bateman	
2016	Eddie the Eagle	Warren Sharp	Dexter Fletcher	
2016	Nine Lives	Felix Perkins	Barry Sonnenfeld	
2016	The Jungle Book	King Louie (voice)	Jon Favreau	
2017	Father Figures	Dr. Walter Tinkler	Lawrence Sher	
2018	Irreplaceable You	Myron	Stephanie Laing	
2019	The Jesus Rolls	The Warden	John Turturro	
2020	The War with Grandpa	Jerry	Tim Hill	
2020	Percy	Percy Schmeiser	Clark Johnson	
2020	Wild Mountain Thyme	Tony Reilly	John Patrick Shanley	
2024	Dune: Part Two	Shaddam IV	Denis Villeneuve	
2024	From Roger Moore with Love	Himself	Jack Cocker	Documentary film
2026	Back in Black	Clyde	Ron Murphy	

== Television ==
In the beginning of his acting career, Walken had relatively small roles in episodes for a number of television shows. This list includes appearances in various episodes of fictional shows, while excluding appearances as himself on talk shows, interview shows, ceremonies, and the like.

Year	Show	Role	Run
1953	Wonderful John Acton^{[III]}	Kevin Acton	Recurring character
1954	The Motorola Television Hour^{[III]}		Episode: "The Muldoon Matter"
1954–1956	The Guiding Light	Michael "Mike" Bauer#1	
1960	Deadline	Marty	Episode: "The Cave"
1963	Naked City^{[III]}	Chris Johannis / Brian Trust	2 episodes
1970	Hawaii Five-O	Walt Kramer	Episode: "Run, Johnny, Run"
1976	Muggsy	Jellybean	Episode: "The Biggest Liar in Town"
1977	Kojak	Ben Wiley	Episode: "Kiss It All Goodbye"
1982	Who Am I This Time?	Harry Nash	Television film
1990–2023	Saturday Night Live	Himself (host) / various	8 episodes
1991	Sarah, Plain and Tall	Jacob Witting	Television film
1993	Skylark	Jacob Witting	Television film
1993	Scam	Jack Shanks	Television film
1999	Vendetta	James Houston	Television film
1999	Sarah, Plain and Tall: Winter's End	Jacob Witting	Television film
2003	Julius Caesar	Cato the Younger	2 episodes
2014	Turks & Caicos	Curtis Pelissier	Television film
2014	Peter Pan Live!	Captain Hook	Live television special
2021–2024	The Outlaws	Frank Sheldon	13 episodes
2022–2025	Severance	Burt Goodman	Main role

III Credited as "Ronnie Walken".

== Theater ==
In addition to acting for film and television, Walken has acted in numerous Broadway and off-Broadway theater productions. He has acted in more than 100 additional plays including some by Shakespeare. This list includes the most popular of them.

Year	Title	Role	Venue	Run
1952	The Climate of Eden^{[IV]}	Berton	Martin Beck Theatre	November 13, 1952 – November 22, 1952
1958	The Visit^{[IV]}	Karl Schill	Lunt-Fontanne Theatre	May 5, 1958 – July 5, 1958
1958	The Visit^{[IV]}	Karl Schill	Morosco Theatre	August 20, 1958 – November 29, 1958
1958	J.B.^{[III]}	David^{[V]}	ANTA Playhouse	December 11, 1958 – October 24, 1959
1964	High Spirits^{[III]}	musical ensemble	Alvin Theatre	April 7, 1964 – February 27, 1965
1965	Baker Street	One of the Killers	The Broadway Theatre	February 2, 1965 – November 30, 1965
1965	Baker Street	One of the Killers	Martin Beck Theatre	November 3, 1965 – November 14, 1965
1966	The Lion in Winter	Philip Capet (King of France)	Ambassador Theatre	March 3, 1966 – May 21, 1966
1966	The Rose Tattoo	Jack Hunter	Billy Rose Theatre	November 9, 1966 – December 31, 1966
1967	The Unknown Soldier and His Wife	Unknown Soldier	Vivian Beaumont Theater	July 6, 1967 – September 16, 1967
1967	The Unknown Soldier and His Wife	Unknown Soldier	George Abbott Theatre	September 18, 1967 – November 12, 1967
1968	Romeo and Juliet	Romeo	Stratford Shakespeare Festival	
1968	A Midsummer Night's Dream	Lysander	Stratford Shakespeare Festival	
1970	Lemon Sky	Alan	Playhouse Theatre	May 17–31, 1970
1971–1972	Caligula	Caligula	Yale Repertory Theatre	November 25, 1971 – January 15, 1972
1972	Enemies	Sintsov	Vivian Beaumont Theater	November 9, 1972 – December 16, 1972
1973	The Plough and the Stars	Jack Clitheroe	Vivian Beaumont Theater	January 4, 1973 – February 10, 1973
1973	The Merchant of Venice	Bassanio	Vivian Beaumont Theater	March 1, 1973 – April 7, 1973
1975	Sweet Bird of Youth	Chance Wayne	Harkness Theatre	December 29, 1975 – February 8, 1976
1984	Hurlyburly	Mickey	Ethel Barrymore Theatre	August 7, 1984 – June 2, 1985
1995	Him	Elvis Presley, director, writer	New York Shakespeare Festival	
2000	James Joyce's The Dead	Gabriel Conroy	Belasco Theatre	January 11, 2000 – April 16, 2000
2001	The Seagull	Sorin	Delacorte Theater	July 24, 2001 – August 26, 2001
2010	A Behanding in Spokane	Carmichael	Schoenfeld Theatre	March 4, 2010 – June 6, 2010

== Video games ==
Year	Title	Role
1996	Ripper	Detective Vince Magnotta
1996	Privateer 2: The Darkening	David Hassan
2003	True Crime: Streets of LA	Sergeant George
2005	True Crime: New York City	Gabriel Whitting

== Music videos ==
- 1993: Madonna – "Bad Girl" as Madonna's Guardian Angel
- 1995: Skid Row – "Breakin' Down" as Gabriel from The Prophecy trilogy
- 2001: Fatboy Slim – "Weapon of Choice" (also co-choreographer)

== CD ==
- 1997: "The Raven" by Edgar Allan Poe on Closed on Account of Rabies

== See also ==
- List of awards and nominations received by Christopher Walken
