= List of awards and nominations received by Christopher Walken =

Christopher Walken awards and nominations
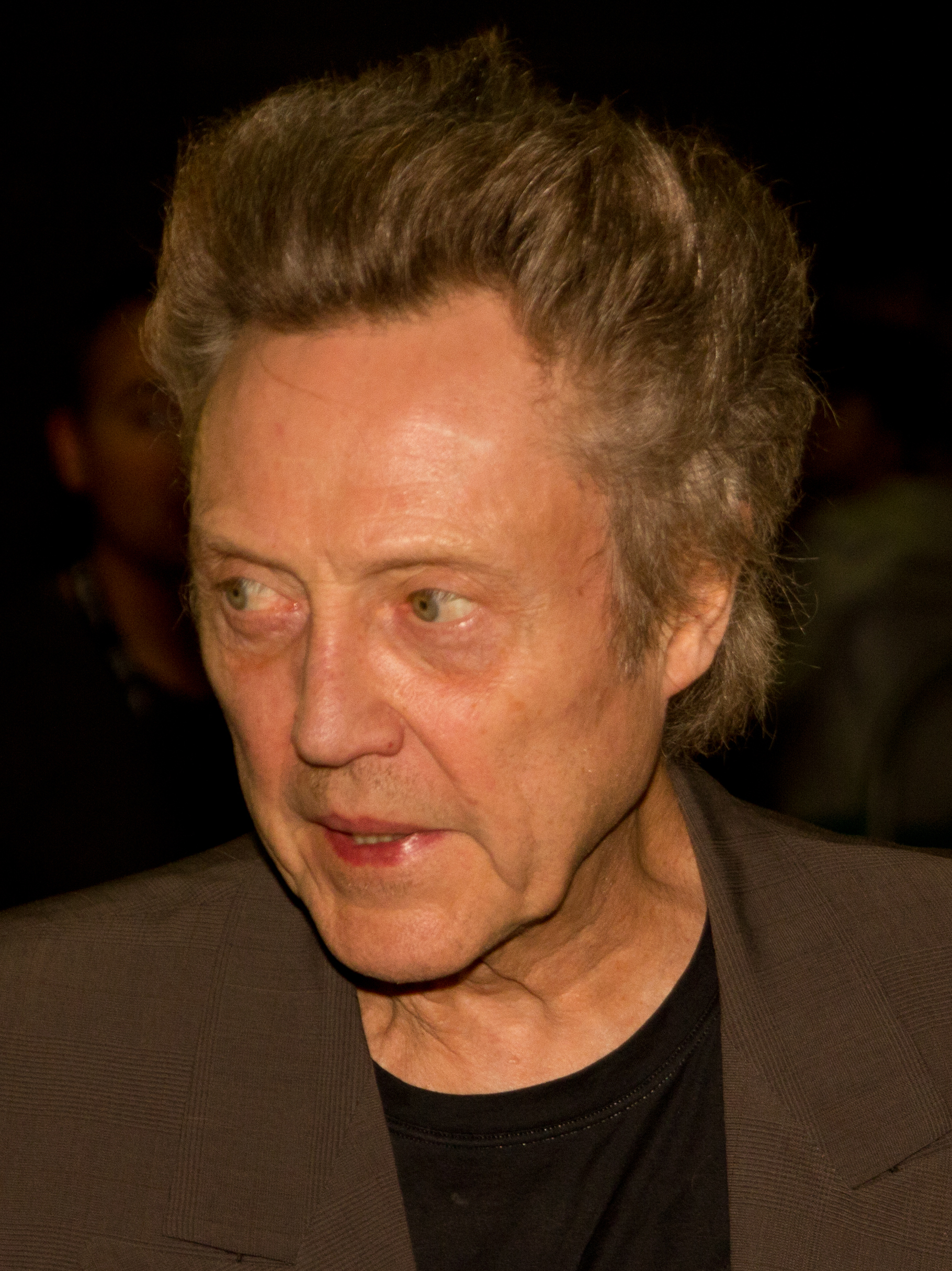
- Walken at the 2012 Tribeca Festival
Awards and nominations
Award	Wins	Nominations
Academy Awards	1	2
Actor Awards	1	4
British Academy Film Awards	1	2
Golden Globes	0	1
Primetime Emmy Awards	0	2
Tony Awards	0	2

Totals (Note: Certain award groups do not simply award one winner. They acknowledge several different recipients, have runners-up, and have third place. Since this is a specific recognition and is different from losing an award, runner-up mentions are considered wins in this award tally. For simplification and to avoid errors, each award in this list has been presumed to have had a prior nomination.)
- Wins: 25
- Nominations: 52

Christopher Walken is an American actor known for his performances on stage and screen. He has received numerous accolades including an Academy Award, a British Academy Film Award, and an Actor Award as well as nominations for two Tony Awards, two Primetime Emmy Awards, and a Golden Globe. Walken's films have grossed more than $1.8 billion in the United States.

Walken won the Academy Award for Best Supporting Actor for his portrayal of a rural Pennsylvania steel worker who goes to fight in Vietnam in Michael Cimino's war drama The Deer Hunter (1978). He was Oscar-nominated for playing the father of con man Frank Abagnale in the Steven Spielberg-directed biographical crime comedy-drama Catch Me If You Can (2002). The role for the later earned him the BAFTA Award for Best Actor in a Supporting Role and the Actor Award in the same category.

For his roles on television, he was nominated for two Primetime Emmy Awards for Outstanding Lead Actor in a Limited or Anthology Series or Movie for playing a widowed farmer in the CBS movie Sarah, Plain and Tall (1991), and for Outstanding Supporting Actor in a Drama Series for playing an elderly worker at a biotechnology corporation in the Apple TV psychological thriller series Severance (2022–present).

On stage, he received two Tony Award nominations, his first for Best Actor in a Musical for playing the protagonist in the Broadway musical James Joyce's The Dead (2000) and for Best Actor in a Play for mysterious one handed man in Martin McDonagh's black comedy play A Behanding in Spokane (2010). His other theatre accolades include a Drama Desk Award, two Obie Awards, and a Theatre World Award.

== Major association ==
=== Academy Awards ===
Year	Category	Nominated work	Result	Ref.
1979	Best Supporting Actor	The Deer Hunter	Won	
2003	Best Supporting Actor	Catch Me If You Can	Nominated	

=== Actor Awards ===
Year	Category	Nominated work	Result	Ref.
2003	Outstanding Performance by a Male Actor in a Supporting Role	Catch Me If You Can	Won	
2008	Outstanding Performance by a Cast in a Motion Picture^{[I]}	Hairspray	Nominated	
2023	Outstanding Performance by an Ensemble in a Drama Series^{[II]}	Severance	Nominated	
2026	Outstanding Performance by an Ensemble in a Drama Series^{[VII]}	Severance	Nominated	

=== BAFTA Awards ===
Year	Category	Nominated work	Result	Ref.
1980	Best Actor in a Supporting Role	The Deer Hunter	Nominated	
2003	Best Actor in a Supporting Role	Catch Me If You Can	Won	

=== Emmy Awards ===
Year	Category	Nominated work	Result	Ref.
Primetime Emmy Awards
1991	Outstanding Lead Actor in a Limited Series or Movie	Sarah, Plain and Tall	Nominated	
2022	Outstanding Supporting Actor in a Drama Series	Severance	Nominated	

=== Golden Globes ===
Year	Category	Nominated work	Result	Ref.
1979	Best Supporting Actor – Motion Picture	The Deer Hunter	Nominated	

=== Tony Awards ===
Year	Category	Nominated work	Result	Ref.
2000	Best Actor in a Musical	James Joyce's The Dead	Nominated	
2010	Best Actor in a Play	A Behanding in Spokane	Nominated	

== Other theatre awards ==
Organizations	Year	Category	Work	Result	Ref.
Clarence Derwent Awards	1966	Most Promising Male	The Lion in Winter	Won	
Drama Desk Awards	1970	Special Award	Lemon Sky	Won	
Drama Desk Awards	2010	Outstanding Actor in a Play	A Behanding in Spokane	Nominated	
Jeff Awards	1975	Best Guest Artist	Sweet Bird of Youth	Nominated	
Obie Awards	1975	Distinguished Performance by an Actor	Kid Champion	Won	
Obie Awards	1981	Distinguished Performance by an Actor	The Sea Gulf	Won	
Outer Critics Circle Awards	2010	Outstanding Actor in a Play	A Behanding in Spokane	Nominated	
Theatre World Awards	1967	Outstanding Broadway or Off-Broadway Debut	The Rose Tattoo	Won	

== Critics awards ==
Organizations	Year	Category	Work	Result	Ref.
Boston Society of Film Critics	2012	Best Cast^{[VI]}	Seven Psychopaths	Won	
Critics' Choice Awards	2008	Best Acting Ensemble^{[I]}	Hairspray	Won	
Dallas–Fort Worth Film Critics Association	2002	Best Supporting Actor	Catch Me If You Can	Nominated	
Houston Film Critics Society	2007	Best Performance by an Ensemble Cast^{[I]}	Hairspray	Won	
Los Angeles Film Critics Association	2002	Best Supporting Actor	Catch Me If You Can	Runner-up	
National Society of Film Critics	1978	Best Supporting Actor	The Deer Hunter	Nominated	
National Society of Film Critics	2002	Best Supporting Actor	Catch Me If You Can	Won	
New York Film Critics Circle	1978	Best Supporting Actor	The Deer Hunter	Won	
San Diego Film Critics Society	2012	Best Supporting Actor	Seven Psychopaths	Nominated	
San Diego Film Critics Society	2012	Best Performance by an Ensemble^{[VI]}	Seven Psychopaths	Nominated	
Vancouver Film Critics Circle	2002	Best Supporting Actor	Catch Me If You Can	Runner-up	

== Miscellaneous associations ==
Organizations	Year	Category	Work	Result	Ref.
AARP Movies for Grownups Awards	2003	Best Breakaway Performance	Catch Me If You Can	Nominated	
AARP Movies for Grownups Awards	2008	Best Grownup Love Story^{[III]}	Hairspray	Won	
American Comedy Awards	2001	Funniest Male Guest Appearance in a Television Series	Saturday Night Live	Won	
Astra TV Awards	2022	Best Supporting Actor in a Streaming Drama Series	Severance	Nominated	
Fangoria Chainsaw Awards	1996	Best Actor	The Prophecy	Won	
Fangoria Chainsaw Awards	1996	Fangoria Horror Hall of Fame		Won	
Golden Raspberry Awards	2003	Worst Supporting Actor	The Country Bears	Nominated	
Golden Raspberry Awards	2004	Worst Supporting Actor	Gigli / Kangaroo Jack	Nominated	
Hollywood Film Awards	2007	Ensemble of the Year^{[I]}	Hairspray	Won	
Montreal World Film Festival	2004	Best Actor^{[IV]}	Around the Bend	Won	
MTV Movie & TV Awards	2000	Best Villain	Sleepy Hollow	Nominated	
MTV Video Music Awards	2001	Best Choreography^{[V]}	"Weapon of Choice"	Won	
Palm Springs International Film Festival	2008	Best Ensemble Cast^{[I]}	Hairspray	Won	
Satellite Awards	2005	Best Supporting Actor in a Motion Picture – Drama	Around the Bend	Won	
Saturn Awards	1984	Best Actor	The Dead Zone	Nominated	
Saturn Awards	1996	Best Supporting Actor	The Prophecy	Nominated	
Saturn Awards	2000	Best Supporting Actor	Sleepy Hollow	Nominated	
Saturn Awards	2017	Best Supporting Actor	The Jungle Book	Nominated	
Shanghai Television Festival	1988	Magnolia Award for Best Actor in a Television Series	Witness in the War Zone	Won	
Stinkers Bad Movie Awards	2003	Worst Supporting Actor	The Country Bears	Nominated	

== Honorary awards ==
Other accolades received by Christopher Walken
Year	Organization	Honor	Ref.
1995	Gotham Awards	Career Tribute	
1999	Florida Film Festival	Artistic Achievement Award	
2001	Deauville Film Festival	Special Tribute Award	
2005	CineVegas	Marquee Award	
2008	Hasty Pudding Theatricals	Man of the Year	

== See also ==
- Christopher Walken filmography

== Notes ==
I Shared with Nikki Blonsky, John Travolta, Michelle Pfeiffer, Queen Latifah, Amanda Bynes, James Marsden, Brittany Snow, Zac Efron, Elijah Kelley, and Allison Janney.
II Shared with Patricia Arquette, Michael Chernus, Zach Cherry, Michael Cumpsty, Dichen Lachman, Britt Lower, Adam Scott, Tramell Tillman, Jen Tullock, and John Turturro.
III Shared with John Travolta.
IV Tied with Fan Wei for The Parking Attendant in July.
V Shared with Michael Rooney and Spike Jonze.
VI Shared with Colin Farrell, Sam Rockwell, Abbie Cornish, Linda Bright Clay, Kevin Corrigan, Woody Harrelson, Željko Ivanek, Long Nguyen, Christine Marzano, Tom Waits, Brendan Sexton III, Olga Kurylenko, Bonny, Gabourey Sidibe, Michael Pitt, Michael Stuhlbarg, and Harry Dean Stanton. VII Shared with Patricia Arquette, Sarah Bock, Michael Chernus, Zach Cherry, Dichen Lachman, Britt Lower, Ólafur Darri Ólafsson, Adam Scott, Tramell Tillman, Jen Tullock, and John Turturro.
