= Ellen McElduff =

Canadian actress

- Born: March 7, 1964 (age 62)
- Occupation: Actress
- Spouse: Eric Overmyer

Ellen McElduff (born March 7, 1964) is a Canadian film, television, and stage actress, best known for roles in JFK, Oz, Homicide: Life on the Street, and many acclaimed stage productions.

== Career ==
=== Stage roles ===
She is an accomplished stage actress. The New York Times has praised her performances on many occasions. They called her performance in JoAnne Akalaitis's anthology of six sketches titled Help Wanted "horrifyingly funny". They also said she was "especially good" in Akalaitis's Dead End Kids and "enticing" in Dressed Like an Egg.

She has appeared in several other stage productions including Samuel Beckett's Cascando, Cold Harbor (a play about Ulysses S. Grant), and Mark Rappaport's Chain Letters and Imposters, and more. She received an Obie Award citation for her work in Southern Exposure.

She also featured in Him, a 1995 play written by actor Christopher Walken, who also took the lead role. She played several of the female roles, with Michael Feingold of The Village Voice saying she was "the only cast member who actually seemed to become everyone she represented". It debuted in the New York Shakespeare Festival and revolved around the afterlife of Elvis Presley.

=== Film and television roles ===
She is best known to film and television audiences for portraying Jean Hill in Oliver Stone's JFK (1991), Eleanor O'Connor in Oz, and Billie Lou Hatfield in Homicide: Life on the Street, Homicide: The Movie, and Law & Order: Special Victims Unit.

She has featured in many movies, including Stephen King's directorial debut Maximum Overdrive (1986) (as Wanda June), Jodie Foster's directorial debut Little Man Tate (1991), Working Girls (1986), Desperate Hours (1990), Julian Po (1997), and Al Pacino's independent movie Chinese Coffee (2000).

Though better known for larger roles in Oz and Homicide: Life on the Street, she also had small roles in shows like Knots Landing and Law & Order.

== Personal life ==
She was married to writer and producer Eric Overmyer.
