= Linda (1993 film) =

- Genre: Crime; Drama; Thriller
- Based on: Linda by John D. MacDonald
- Written by: Nevin Schreiner
- Directed by: Nathaniel Gutman
- Starring: Richard Thomas; Virginia Madsen; Ted McGinley
- Music by: David Michael Frank
- Country of origin: United States
- Original language: English

Production
- Producer: Bob Roe
- Production locations: Kure Beach, North Carolina; Whiteville, North Carolina; Wilmington, North Carolina
- Cinematography: Bryan England
- Editor: Karen I. Stern
- Running time: 100 minutes
- Production company: Wilshire Court Productions

Original release
- Network: USA Network
- Release: October 8, 1993

Linda is a 1993 American made-for-television crime drama film based on a novella by John D. MacDonald. It is the second adaptation of that work.

== Plot summary ==
Two couples, the Cowleys (Paul and Linda) and the Jeffries (Brandon/"Jeff" and Stella), have been friends for about a year. They spend so much time together they decide to vacation together in Florida. Jeff and Linda are secretly having an affair. They spend so much time together that their spouses become suspicious. Events spiral out of control. Linda decides to speed up Brandon's vow about "till death us do part" by shooting Stella dead with his consent. But Paul, who also gets shot, isn't going down so easily. The one innocent person is then framed for murder but luckily finds an ally in a local police officer who is determined to expose the truth.

== Cast ==
- Virginia Madsen as Linda Cowley
- Richard Thomas as Paul Cowley
- Ted McGinley as Brandon "Jeff" Jeffries
- Laura Harrington as Stella Jeffries
- T.E. Russell as David Hill
- J. Don Ferguson as Davis Vernon
- Richard K. Olsen as Journeyman
- David Dwyer as Dike Matthews
- Michael Goodwin as Carl Shepp
- Maria Howell as Shirley
- Vito Mirabella as Vito
