= Engine Trouble =

Engine Trouble is a 2002 17-minute-long fantasy short film. It was directed by Brad Barnes, written by Brad and Todd Barnes, produced by Todd Barnes, and starred Celine du Tertre and the voice of Academy Award-winner actor Christopher Walken.

== Plot ==
A 7-year-old girl who is convinced by her tough-talking toy fire engine, Rusty, that he is needed as a reinforcement for the FDNY on September 11.

== Cast ==
| Actor/Actress | Role |
|---|---|
| Christopher Walken | Rusty (voice) |
| Celine du Tertre | Sam |
| Marsha Dietlein Bennett | Sam's Mom |
| Edelen McWilliams | Anna Stracht |
| Julie Finch | P.O. Clerk |
| Susham Bedi | Woman in Depot |
| Billy Devino | Man in Wheelchair |
| Matthew Bennett | Sam's Dad |
