= Nathaniel Gutman =

Israeli-American filmmaker

- נתנאל גוטמן
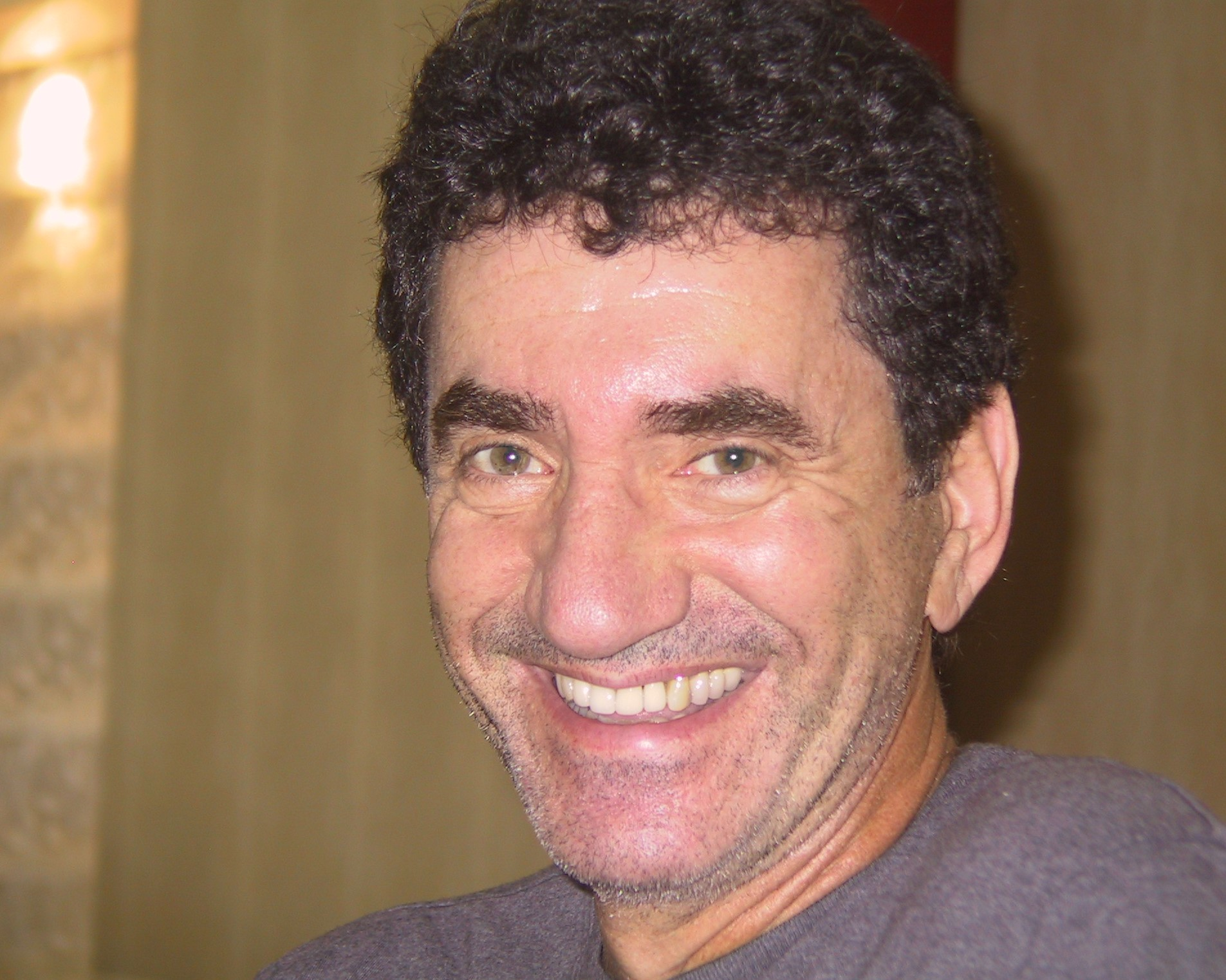
- Nathaniel Gutman, 2019
- Born: December 15, 1954 (age 71); Jerusalem, Israel
- Education: University of Southern California
- Occupation: Filmmaker
- Years active: 1971–present
- Notable work: Deadline and Linda
- Awards: DAG-Fernsehpreis in Silber für

Nathaniel Gutman (Hebrew: נתנאל גוטמן; born December 15, 1954) is an Israeli-American filmmaker, best known for directing Deadline, starring Christopher Walken, and the TV movie Linda, starring Virginia Madsen.

== Early life and education ==
Gutman was born in Jerusalem, Israel to Jewish immigrants from Berlin. His father was Joshua Gutman.

Gutman studied Philosophy and Art history at the Hebrew University of Jerusalem. He later studied cinema in the Master of Arts program at the University of Southern California, where he wrote his thesis, "American Films in Israel".

== Career ==
Gutman is best known for directing Deadline (1987), also known as Witness in the War Zone, starring Christopher Walken, as well as Linda (1993), a TV movie also known as Lust for Murder, starring Virginia Madsen.

He has also served in various roles, including as a director for the Israel Film Institute; as a radio producer for the Israel Broadcasting Authority; and as a lecturer and chair for the Steve Tisch School of Film and Television at Tel Aviv University.

=== Film ===
- Das Tal der Schatten (1999) (or The Valley of the Shadows) stars Natalia Wörner.
- Twice Upon a Time (1988) stars Tim Roth and Louise Lombard.
- Deadline / Witness in the War Zone (1987) was named by photographer Thomas Dworzak as one of the top ten movies that inspire him.

=== Television ===
- When the Dark Man Calls (1995), both produced and directed by Gutman, follows a popular radio talk show host (played by Joan Van Ark) whose parents' killer becomes her stalker. The movie is based on the novel by Stuart M. Kaminsky and was released in 1995 by Power Pictures.
- Linda' / Lust for Murder (1993) was adapted from John D. MacDonald's novella of the same name.
- Children's Island (1985), starring George Montgomery and J. D. Roth, was an eight-part UK series that takes place during wartime and follows 11 children who are trying to reach the U.S. from Britain by crossing the Atlantic. The children become lost at sea but manage to seek help from the grandson of the U.S. president.

=== Screenwriting ===
Gutman co-wrote the screenplay for Im Schatten von Gestern (1985) with Maria Matray; they won the DAG Silver Award. In 2007, his screenplay, HourZero, received an honorable mention for Thriller/Horror.

=== Documentaries ===
Gutman has written and directed several documentaries for Israeli and German television, including: America, I love you (אמריקה איי לאב יו), Brothers and Strangers (אחים ורחוקים), and Highschool (מחר בגרות). In 1973, Shalom Productions released America, I love you (or Amerikah, ay lʼaṿ yu). The documentary was later distributed by Alden Films.

Gutman also wrote and directed The Yeckes.

==== The Yeckes ====
Produced and directed by Gutman, The Yeckes (variant spellings include The Jeckes and The Yekkes) is a documentary about the ailing German-Jewish community in Israel. It was aired by ZDF in 1979. There was some controversy regarding the documentary as the term Yeckes was considered by German Jews to be offensive, but a supreme court judge ruled that the term had evolved and shed its previous connotations. The Yeckes were also known for living culturally as Europeans, specifically as Germans, within Israeli society. Critical reception was supportive of the documentary.

== Bibliography ==
- "Excerpt from Weissensee by Nathaniel Gutman." Tiferet Journal. 29 June 2021.
- Gutman, Nathaniel. "Chiaroscuro." ONE ART: A Journal of Poetry. 14 Nov 2021. https://oneartpoetry.com/2021/11/14/chiaroscuro-by-nathaniel-gutman/
- Gutman, Nathaniel. "Her Sabbath Dress." Pangyrus. 14 Dec 2021. https://oneartpoetry.com/2021/11/14/chiaroscuro-by-nathaniel-gutman/
- Gutman, Nathaniel. "In the Eye of the Beholder." The American Journal of Poetry, Vol. 7, 2019. http://www.theamericanjournalofpoetry.com/v7-gutman.html
- Gutman, Nathaniel. American Films in Israel. 1971. University of Southern California, Master of Arts (Cinema), Thesis.
