= When the Dark Man Calls =

- Genre: Thriller
- Based on: When the Dark Man Calls by Stuart M. Kaminsky
- Written by: Pablo Fenjves
- Directed by: Nathaniel Gutman
- Starring: Joan Van Ark; Chris Sarandon; James Read
- Music by: David Michael Frank
- Country of origin: United States
- Original language: English

Production
- Producer: Julian Marks
- Production location: Toronto, Ontario Canada
- Cinematography: João Fernandes
- Editors: Louise Innes; Debra Gavlak
- Running time: 89 minutes
- Production company: Wilshire Court Productions

Original release
- Network: USA Network
- Release: June 14, 1995

When the Dark Man Calls is a 1995 American made-for-television thriller film directed by Nathaniel Gutman and starring Joan Van Ark and Chris Sarandon based on the 1984 novel of the same name. It was released by Wilshire Court Productions and was first telecast on the USA Network on Wednesday, June 14, 1995.

== Premise ==
The past of a radio talk show host comes back to haunt her as her parents' killer is released from jail after 25 years.

== Plot ==
Julianne Kaiser (Van Ark) is a radio host and therapist who's going through a divorce with her daughter's father, Max. One night, Julie is doing her nightly radio talk show when she gets a mysterious call from a man who says he was unavailable for the last twenty-five years because of a crime he did not commit. Unsure of what he's talking about, Julie continues to ask questions when the man reveals that Julie knows exactly what he's talking about and that she's been dreading this day for the last twenty-five years. Suspicious of the obscene language, Julie's colleague Sue disconnects the call.

After the radio show, Julie talks to Sue about the divorce. Suddenly, Julie has a flashback to when she was a little girl (portrayed by Long) where the unknown circumstances the caller mentioned took place. On her drive home, Julie comes to a red light, then glances at the car to her right, she recognizes the man and his snake tattoo. Feeling worried, Julie calls her brother Lloyd, telling him that she saw a man by the name of Parmenter (Lewis) earlier that night. This unveils that Parmenter is the man with the snake tattoo whom Julie saw that night and the man Julie sent to prison. Lloyd tells Julie that Parmenter got twenty-five years to life. Julie then reveals that it has been twenty-five years since he was sentenced and that she is the one who testified against him and the reason he was in prison.

Once again, while Julie is live on air, Parmenter calls once again and threatens Julie. After dropping off her daughter at the bus stop, Julie goes to Lloyds construction site to tell him she's going to Bradford, Illinois to see her childhood therapist Dr. Petrie. During recess, we see Julie's daughter Angie skipping rope with her friends, when Parmenter appears and calls her over, he tells her he knew a little girl like her who was sweet on the outside and evil on the inside. Parmenter later calls Julie on her radio show that night to repeat the encounter and says that her daughter is going to lose her mother.

Parmenter continues to quietly stalk Julie until they come face to face at a grocery store. That night while in her parking garage, Parmenter appears and attempts to strangle Julie with a chain to which she escapes. Julie contacts the police and meets Det. Lieberman, an old flame. Lieberman visits Julie's house one afternoon and they have sex, after which Lieberman asks why Julie never mentioned the murders. Julie then questions if Parmenter really did kill her parents. During a session with client Billy (Robson), Julie questions his intentions and his relationship with her.

During another session with Dr. Petrie, Julie opens up about her emotional abuse from her father. Julie continues to say how she doesn't think Parmenter killed her parents, when asked what she was suggesting by Dr. Petrie, Julie questions if she set Parmenter up for her own crime. Julie then travels to her old family home, now abandoned and decaying. While walking through the house, she discovers a dead Parmenter. While driving home with Detective Lieberman, he points out that at the time of the murder she was supposedly the only one home, and Parmenter didn't kill himself.

The following day during another session with Billy, he tells her that she should be happy because everything is going to be ok now. After discovering she and Billy went to the same high school around the same time, the police question Billy as to where he was, Billy then breaks down in tears when asked if he killed Parmenter. Max then comes to Julie's house in a drunken state and starts yelling at her about how she should be grateful for all he's done for her. This leads Julie to believe Max actually killed her parents because he knew her better than anyone since childhood.

Wanting to remember the night of the killings and whose shadow she saw on the wall, Julie returns to her old home to which Max is also there and tells her she should've never come back. Max is then temporarily knocked out by Lloyd who says she was right about Max. After telling Lloyd to go get help, Julie returns upstairs to her parents' bedroom where the crimes took place. After seeing the shadow once again, Julie turns to the right to find a Young Lloyd (Piché). Revealing it was Lloyd who killed her parents and who killed Parmenter. After discovering Julie at the crime scene, Lloyd fails to persuade her to leave it alone. Lloyd then tackles Julie to the ground in an attempt to kill her. Until two shots ring out from Julie and the gun Lloyd gave her. The film ends with Julie, Max, and Angie leaving Chicago for New York.

== Cast ==
- Joan Van Ark as Julianne Kaiser
  - Kathryn Long as Young Julie
- Chris Sarandon as Lloyd Carson
  - Matt Piché as Young Lloyd
- James Read as Detective Michael Lieberman
- Geoffrey Lewis as John "Parmenter"
  - Jay Allan Doucet as Young Parmenter
- Tony Devon as Officer Hutton
- David Ferry as Howard Albright
- Barry Flatman as Max Kaiser
- Janet-Laine Green as Sue Winston
- Frances Hyland as Dr. Martha Petrie
- Caterina Scorsone as Angie
- Wayne Robson as Billy Orr

== Release ==
Country	Date
United States	June 18, 2000
United Kingdom	March 1996 (DVD release)
Japan	September 20, 1996
Germany	March 22, 2003

- Also known as
  - Quando a Morte Chama (Brazil)
  - La nuit du mal (Canada & France) / (French title)
  - Wenn der schwarze Mann dich holt (Germany)
  - Mörka skuggor (Sweden) / (VHS Title)

== Home media ==
When the Dark Man Calls was released on VHS in 1995 by Paramount Home Video and was released on DVD in 2006.

== Reception ==
A positive contemporary review in Variety praised the script, direction and acting and concluded "It may be far-fetched formula drama, but it’s also a successful attention-getter".

A negative review in TV Guide stated that "Unfortunately, this "Dark Man" of childhood secrets has called too many times already, and this thoroughly routine nail-biter should have been titled "When the Deja-Vu Man Calls." This is standard fare, featuring a familiar star running a gamut of fearful expressions while the director exhibits enough flair to distract viewers from realizing this warm beer has lost its foam." FilmDienst described it as "A confusing, dialogue-heavy psychological thriller that only meets modest entertainment standards."
