= Puss in Boots (1988 film) =

1988 film

- Theatrical release poster
- Directed by: Eugene Marner
- Written by: Charles Perrault (fairy tale "Le chat botté"); Carole Lucia Satrina (screenplay)
- Based on: Puss in Boots by Charles Perrault
- Produced by: Yoram Globus; Menahem Golan; Itzik Kol
- Starring: Christopher Walken; Jason Connery; Carmela Marner; Yossi Graber; Amnon Meskin; Elki Jacobs; Michael Schneider
- Cinematography: Avraham Karpick
- Edited by: Eugene Marner; Carole Lucia Satrina
- Music by: Rafi Kadishzon (original score); Sound: Eli Yarkoni
- Production company: Golan-Globus Productions
- Distributed by: The Cannon Group (USA, theatrical)
- Release date: June 10, 1988
- Running time: 96 minutes
- Country: United States
- Language: English

Puss in Boots, sometimes also listed as Cannon Movie Tales: Puss in Boots, is a 1988 musical version of the story of Puss in Boots, starring Christopher Walken as "Puss" and Jason Connery as the youngest son who is assisted by Puss. Carmela Marner stars as the Princess. The film was directed by Eugene Marner and the screenplay was by Carole Lucia Satrina. It is a part of a series of films known collectively as the Cannon Movie Tales.

== Plot ==
In this film, Puss in Boots (Christopher Walken) transforms from cat to a bespoke gentleman who requests a pair of boots, and then tries to restore the reputation of his master (Jason Connery). When he puts his boots on, he transforms back to and from his cat form.

== Cast ==
- Christopher Walken as Puss in Boots
- Jason Connery as Corin
- Carmela Marner as Princess Vera
- Yossi Graber as the King
- Amnon Meskin as the Ogre
- Elki Jacobs as Lady Clara
- Michael Schneider as Walpole

== Songs ==
- "Prologue"

Music by Michael Abbott
Lyrics by Anne Pearson Crosswell
Performed by Peasant Cast

- "A Happy Cat"

Music by Michael Abbott
Lyrics by Anne Pearson Crosswell
Performed by Christopher Walken and Nick Curtis

- "I'll Watch Over You - Cat's Lullaby"

Music by Michael Abbott
Lyrics by Anne Pearson Crosswell
Performed by Christopher Walken

- "Gift for the King"

Music by Michael Abbott
Lyrics by Anne Pearson Crosswell
Performed by The King's Court

- "Love at First Sight"

Music by Michael Abbott
Lyrics by Anne Pearson Crosswell
Performed by Carmela Marner and Nick Curtis

- "Genteel"

Music by Michael Abbott
Lyrics by Anne Pearson Crosswell
Performed by Christopher Walken, Nick Curtis, Carmela Marner and Elki Jacobs

- "Love at First Sight (Reprise)"

Music by Michael Abbott
Lyrics by Anne Pearson Crosswell
Performed by Carmela Marner and Nick Curtis

- "Stick Your Neck out Now and Then"

Music by Michael Abbott
Lyrics by Anne Pearson Crosswell
Performed by Christopher Walken, Carmela Marner and Nick Curtis

- "A Happy Cat (Reprise)"

Music by Michael Abbott
Lyrics by Anne Pearson Crosswell
Performed by Christopher Walken, Carmela Marner, Elki Jacobs, Nick Curtis and Cast
