= Deadline (1987 film) =

1987 war/drama film directed by Nathaniel Gutman

- Theatrical release poster
- Directed by: Nathaniel Gutman
- Written by: Hanan Peled
- Produced by: Elisabeth Wolters-Alfs
- Starring: Christopher Walken; Hywel Bennett; Marita Marschall
- Cinematography: Thomas Mauch; Amnon Salomon
- Edited by: Peter Przygodda
- Music by: Hans Jansen; Jacques Zwart
- Production companies: Creative Film; Caro Film
- Distributed by: Virgin Vision (United States); 20th Century Fox (Germany)
- Release date: 2 July 1987 (West Germany)
- Running time: 100 minutes
- Countries: Israel; United States; West Germany
- Language: English
- Box office: $141,211 (US)

Deadline is a 1987 war drama film directed by Nathaniel Gutman. It stars Christopher Walken as American journalist Don Stevens, who is set up amidst the Lebanese Civil War and is fed false information. An international co-production of Israel, the United States, and West Germany, the film was shot in Israel and was released in some countries under the title Witness in the War Zone.

== Plot ==
Ace Reporter Don Stevens (Christopher Walken) is an American journalist who goes to Beirut, Lebanon during the Lebanese Civil War. He stays in a hotel with English journalist Mike Jessop. He is promised an interview with a top PLO leader, Palestinian Yassin Abu-Riadd (Amos Lavi). However, this proves to be a set-up and he is duped into interviewing an impostor who claims the PLO are prepared to negotiate peacefully.

Outraged by this deception, Stevens becomes determined to find out the truth. In this quest he is helped by a Scandinavian doctor, Linda, who it emerges is Yassin's estranged girlfriend. Along the way, Stevens is hindered by everyone around him: The PLO threaten him, the Phalangists arrest him and the Israelis ignore him. Tricked and beaten, he gradually uncovers a murder plot, double agents, the bombing of the Phalangists headquarters and, most terrifying of all, a plan to massacre hundreds of civilians. In a story that takes the lid off events in Lebanon, Don Stevens becomes a reluctant hero, and in doing so, gets the scoop of a lifetime.

== Cast ==
- Christopher Walken as Don Stevens
- Marita Marschall as Linda Larsen
- Hywel Bennett as Mike Jessop
- Arnon Zadok as Hamdi Abu-Yussuf
- Amos Lavi as Yassin Abu-Riadd
- Etti Ankri as Samira
- Moshe Ivgy as Abdul
- Sasson Gabai as Bossam
- Shlomo Bar-Aba as Micha
- Igal Naor as Antoine

== Reception ==
=== Awards ===
Christopher Walken won the Magnolia Award for "Best Actor" at the Shanghai Television Festival.

== See also ==
Sabra and Shatila massacre
