= Him (Walken play) =

Christopher Walken play

Him is a 1995 play written by actor Christopher Walken, who also took the lead role, and which debuted in the New York Shakespeare Festival. It revolved around the afterlife of Elvis Presley, the singer who, as Walken himself turned 15, became his first idol. The play, Walken's first venture into playwriting, adopts a surreal tone, and is replete with references to aspects of Presley's life, as well as to other pieces of theatre, including Hamlet and those of Tennessee Williams. While it enjoyed some positive comments, it was largely panned by the critics.

== Cast ==
- Christopher Walken - Him/Her
- Rob Campbell - Rob
- Larry Block - Doc/Borden/Taxman/Stylagi
- Barton Heyman - Joe/Mel
- Peter Appel - Al/Disappointed Fan/Stylagi
- Ellen McElduff - Nurse/Dolores/Journalist

== Synopsis ==
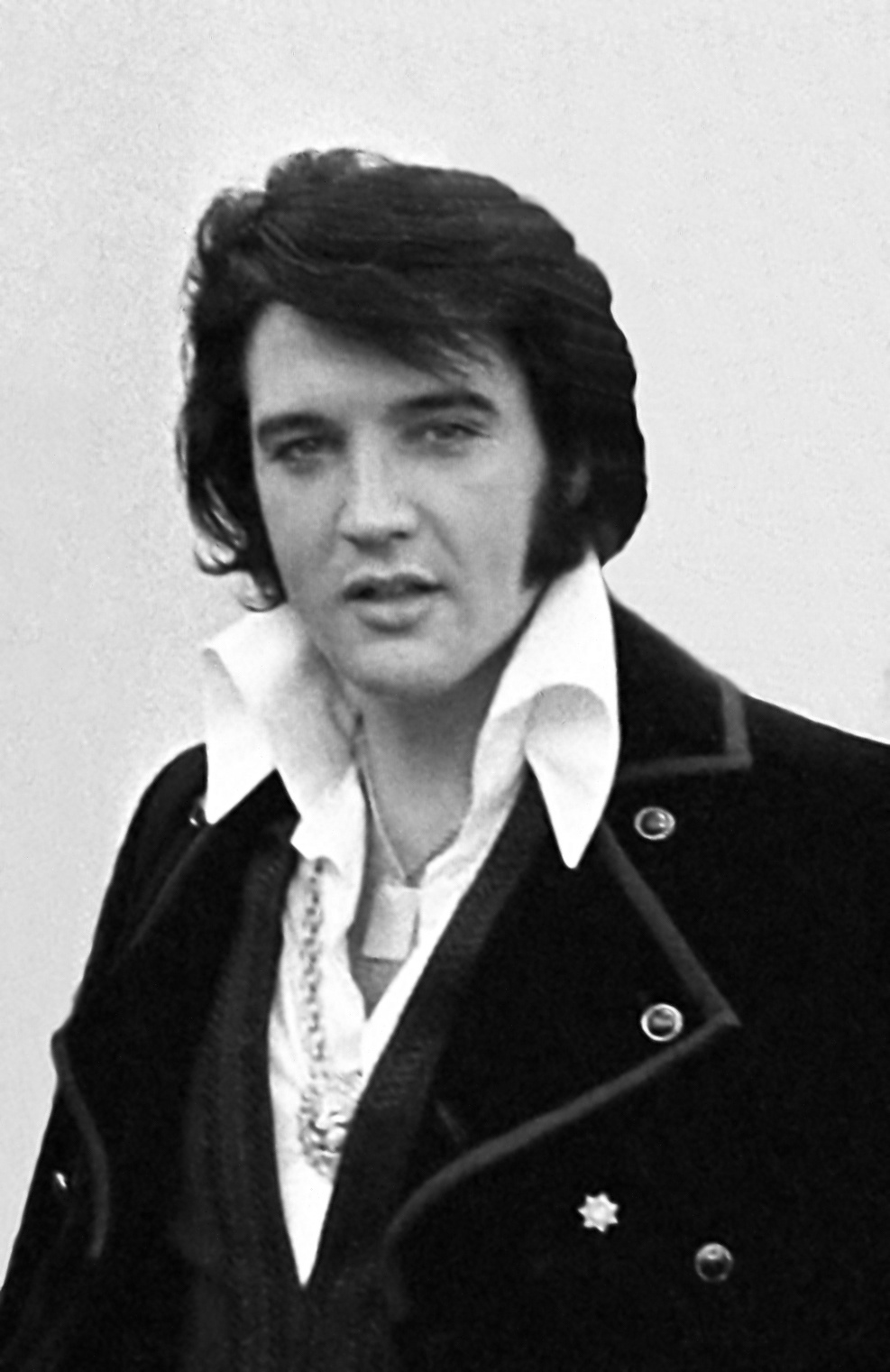
Presley grows exasperated with his brother in the afterlife, and returns to earth to alter his life by fleeing his fame and hiding in Morocco.

Taking place in an "unspecified present", Him depicts Presley (Walken), now deceased and in the afterlife (specifically, limbo, which is filled with Elvis look-a-likes), growing discontented with the antics of his twin brother, Rob (Campbell), who was stillborn many years previously. Rob is responsible for the numerous Elvis sightings taking place, often showing up as a ghost on Earth to fool people into believing that Presley was still alive. Presley relives his death, expressing annoyance at the decision of doctors to terminate life support. He continues to commentate through several surreal scenes, including a segment where a foam-likeness of Presley is tossed around the stage, and when four men dressed in underwear mourn at Presley's graveside. The plot continues, re-telling Presley's death as a disappearing act which enabled Presley to flee to Morocco for a sex change operation to become "her". A truck driver (Heyman) who recognises Presley, now a waitress at a "truckstop", as the aged rock-star, narrates this segment while wrestling with feelings of sympathy and sexual desire.

=== Music ===
Walken does not utilize many impressions of Presley other than clothing and hair style, instead singing in his own voice, with an occasional "Tennessee Williams-style" accent. Musical Direction and Sound Design was done by Mike Nolan, who led the band, "Organ Donor." The band played the show live every night in the stage right orchestra pit. The original music, written by Mike Nolan and Scott Williams, was contemporary to the audience rather than to Presley.

- Mike Nolan - Guitar, Pedal Steel Guitar
- Scott Williams - Bass
- Annie Gosfield - Organ, Sampler, Synthesizer
- Michael Evans - Drums and Percussion

=== Artistry ===
The main poster for the play consisted of the idiosyncratic Presley hair-style set against a yellow background, with 'HIM' in large, pink lettering in the center. Walken requested such imagery, as it was his main physical impression of Presley. Walken himself spends a large amount of time during the play in a green velvet jumpsuit and a cape as he plays Presley, aside from the end scenes as the waitress where he dresses in "female garb".

== Performances ==
The play was deemed as a "workshop" and ran for three weeks of previews followed by thirteen performances. It ran for 75 minutes at each showing, with no intermissions.

== Reception ==
A review by Michael Feingold stated that "You [Walken] write good strong sentences - not true of every actor who takes up playwriting - and your reflections on the strange state we call celebrity in America aren't foolish. But you haven't written a play yet. Disjointed as modern art has been, loose remarks, anecdotes, and routines around a theme still don't add up to a dramatic form." Other critics agreed on Walken's performance as "strange and rambling" or a "farrago of nonsense" while critics Thomas Hischak and Gerald Bordman identified it as the oddest play in New York that year.

The New York Times, however, gave a more positive review of "Christopher Walken's woozily conceived, fantastical new play... In the sharpness and wit of the writing and in the performances by Mr. Walken and Mr. Heyman, this sequence gives you some idea of what the rest of "Him" might have been." The New York Times does not, however, give a totally positive review, as it also states that the play "begins with a certain amount of dizzy promise and ends, approximately 75 minutes later, with the only sequence in the play that comes close to realizing it. In between, "Him" is cluttered with murky thoughts expressed in windy speeches, illustrated by anecdotes that have no point, though the general idea seems not to be a foolish one."

The New Yorker writes that "When he [Walken] dons Elvis's cape, he seems ready to take flight." However the New York Magazine theatre critic, John Simon, referred to it as "garbage" and "maudlin masturbation". He describes Walken's performance as self-indulgent and scornful.

We got a series of pretentious and unfunny vaudeville sketches that dimly and distortingly alluded to Elvis's life and work, but without either analyzing or satirizing him, or making any kind of comprehensible point. The whole thing just maundered on smugly and murkily, reminding me of the joke: What do you get if you cross a mafioso with a deconstructionist? An offer you can't understand.
