= A Behanding in Spokane =

Play written by Martin McDonagh

- Original language: English
- Written by: Martin McDonagh
- Characters: Carmichael; Mervyn; Toby; Marilyn
- Genre: Dark comedy
- Setting: Hotel room, small town America

Premiere
- Date: February 15, 2010
- Place: Schoenfeld Theatre, New York City, NY

A Behanding in Spokane is a 2010 black comedy play by Martin McDonagh. It premiered at the Schoenfeld Theatre on Broadway in 2010. Set in the fictional town of Tarlington, Ohio, it is McDonagh's first play to be set in the United States.

== Plot synopsis ==
A mysterious man named Carmichael has been searching for his missing left hand for 27 years. Two bickering lovebirds, Toby and Marilyn, claim to be in possession of his long-ago severed appendage, and look to collect the reward that Carmichael is offering for its return. An eccentric hotel clerk, Mervyn, gets in the middle of the transaction, and his presence threatens to spoil the proceedings.

== Production ==
A Behanding in Spokane opened on Broadway at the Schoenfeld Theatre on 15 February 2010 in previews, officially on 4 March 2010, and closed on 6 June 2010 after 108 performances.

Directed by John Crowley, the cast featured Christopher Walken as Carmichael, Sam Rockwell as Mervyn, Anthony Mackie as Toby and Zoe Kazan as Marilyn. This is the first play that McDonagh has set in the United States.

== Reception and accolades ==
=== Critical response ===
In a 2010 review published in The New Yorker, Hilton Als criticized McDonagh's play for its use of racist language and for what he described as stereotypical portrayals of Black characters. Als argued that the character Toby, played by Anthony Mackie, reproduced offensive caricatures of Black masculinity and that the play relied on racial hierarchy as a dramatic device. He further suggested that such roles reflected broader limitations faced by Black actors in the industry, who often had to perform stereotyped identities in order to gain wider recognition.

In a 2010 review for The New York Times, theatre critic Ben Brantley offered a mixed assessment of McDonagh's play, praising the performance of Christopher Walken in the role of Carmichael, and describing his portrayal as compelling and central to the production's appeal. However, he argued that the play itself was uneven and less successful than McDonagh's earlier works.

=== Awards and nominations ===
Walken was nominated for the 2010 Tony Award for Best Lead Actor in a Play, the 2010 Outer Critics Circle Award for Outstanding Lead Actor in a Play, and the Drama Desk Award in the same category. The play was nominated for the Drama League Award for Outstanding Production of a Play.
