= Lemon Sky =

Play by Lanford Wilson

Lemon Sky is a 1970 play by Lanford Wilson.

== Production history ==
Lemon Sky was developed at the Eugene O'Neill Theater Center's National Playwrights Conference in 1968, with Michael Douglas in the cast. It was then produced off-off-Broadway at La MaMa Experimental Theatre Club in the East Village of Manhattan in 1970.

The play was then produced at the Studio Arena Theater in Buffalo, New York, then off-Broadway at the Playhouse Theatre, running from May 17 to May 31, 1970. Directed by Warren Enters, the off-Broadway cast featured Charles Durning as Douglas, Christopher Walken as Alan, and Bonnie Bartlett as Ronnie. Walken won the Drama Desk Award for Outstanding Performance.

Clive Barnes, in his The New York Times review of the 1970 production, wrote: "On many levels Lemon Sky is a play very well worth seeing. It has the immediacy of the way we live, and something of the smooth-spoken hysteria."

A revival was produced off-Broadway at the Second Stage Theatre in December 1985, starring Jeff Daniels as Alan, Wayne Tippit as the father, Cynthia Nixon as Carol, and Jill Eikenberry, and directed by Mary B. Robinson. Eikenberry won the 1986 Obie Award for Performance.

== Plot summary ==
The story is about a teenager named Alan who has recently graduated from high school. He moves from the Midwest to San Diego, California, in the 1950s to live with his estranged father and his new family. Attempting to overcome the past, Alan is confronted with problems in his new family.

== Television film ==
Wilson adapted the play for a television film of the same name on PBS. The film was broadcast in February 1988 as part of American Playhouse. Directed by Jan Egleson, the film starred Kevin Bacon as Alan, with Tom Atkins as the father Doug and Lindsay Crouse as Doug's second wife. Kyra Sedgwick, who met future husband Bacon during rehearsals, played Carol, a teenaged boarder: "pill-popping, promiscuous... who seems to spend most of her time with the US Navy." In his review for The New York Times, John J. O'Connor wrote that the film is "terrific", praising the "uncommonly fine performances". Casey Affleck made his screen debut in the film as Alan's stepbrother, Jerry.
