= Christopher Walken =

American actor (born 1943)

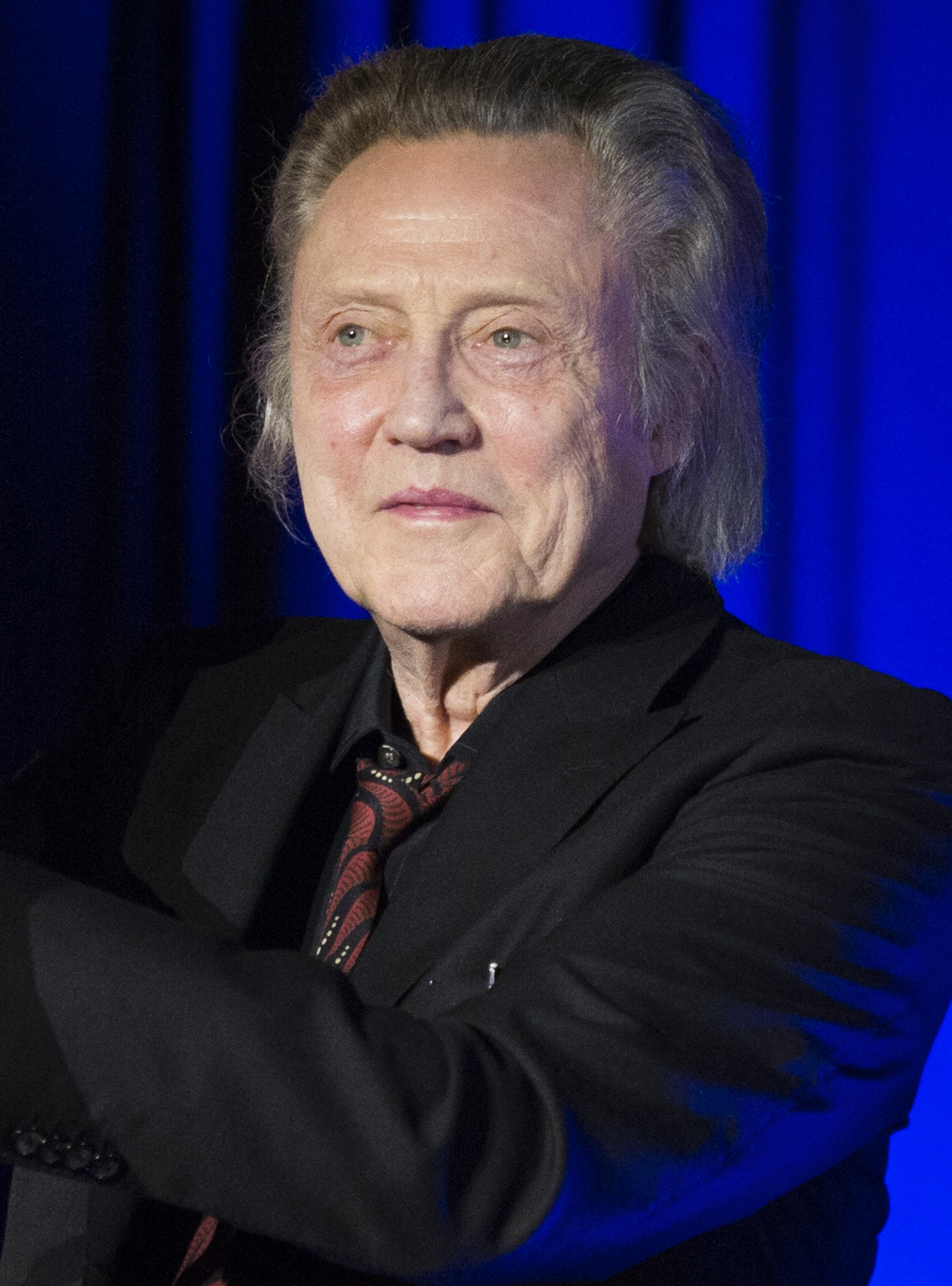
- Walken in 2018
- Born: Ronald Walken; March 31, 1943 (age 83); New York City, U.S.
- Occupation: Actor
- Years active: 1952–present
- Works: Full list
- Spouse: Georgianne Thon (m. 1969)
- Awards: Full list

Signature
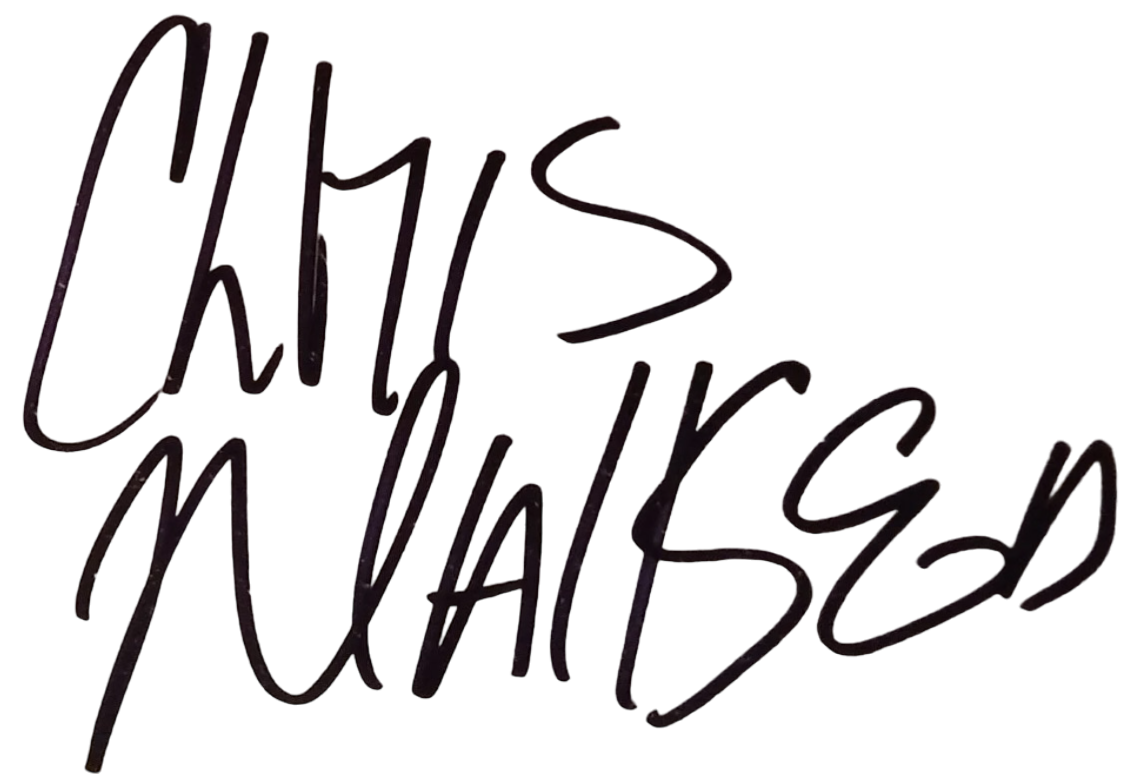

Ronald Walken (born March 31, 1943), known professionally as Christopher Walken, is an American actor. His work on stage and screen has earned him accolades including an Academy Award, an Actor Award, and a BAFTA Award, as well as nominations for two Tony Awards, two Primetime Emmy Awards, and a Golden Globe Award. His films have grossed more than $1.6 billion in the United States.

Walken appeared in supporting roles in films such as The Anderson Tapes (1971), Next Stop, Greenwich Village (1976), Roseland (1977) and Annie Hall (1977), before coming to wider attention as the troubled Vietnam War veteran Nick Chevotarevich in The Deer Hunter (1978). His performance earned him an Academy Award for Best Supporting Actor. He was nominated for the same award for portraying con artist Frank Abagnale's father in Steven Spielberg's Catch Me If You Can (2002).

Since his breakthrough, Walken has appeared in films in various genres, both in lead and supporting roles. These include The Dogs of War (1980), Brainstorm (1983), The Dead Zone (1983), A View to a Kill (1985), At Close Range (1986), Biloxi Blues (1988), King of New York (1990), The Comfort of Strangers (1990), Communion (1989), Batman Returns (1992), True Romance (1993), Pulp Fiction (1994), The Prophecy (1995, and its two sequels), Suicide Kings (1997), Sleepy Hollow (1999), Man on Fire (2004), Wedding Crashers (2005), Hairspray (2007), Seven Psychopaths (2012), A Late Quartet (2012), Percy (2020), and Dune: Part Two (2024). He also provided voice work for the animated films Antz (1998) and The Jungle Book (2016).

On television, Walken has appeared in films such as Who Am I This Time? (1982), and Sarah, Plain and Tall (1991), for which he received a Primetime Emmy Award nomination. More recently, he has starred in television series The Outlaws (2021–2024), and Severance (2022–), the latter of which earned him a Primetime Emmy Award for Outstanding Supporting Actor in a Drama Series nomination. He has guest-hosted Saturday Night Live seven times. His roles on the show include record producer Bruce Dickinson in the "More Cowbell" sketch, the disgraced Confederate officer Colonel Angus, and multiple appearances as an aging, unsuccessful lothario in the Continental sketch.

As a stage actor, Walken starred with Irene Worth in a 1975 Broadway revival of Sweet Bird of Youth. Walken has played the lead in the Shakespeare plays Hamlet, Macbeth, Romeo and Juliet, and Coriolanus. His performance in the original rendition of James Joyce's The Dead (2000), earned him a Tony Award for Best Actor in a Musical nomination. He was nominated for the Tony Award for Best Actor in a Play for his role in Martin McDonagh's A Behanding in Spokane (2010). He also wrote and played the lead role in the 1995 play Him, about his idol Elvis Presley.

== Early life and education ==
Christopher Walken was born Ronald Walken on March 31, 1943, in Astoria, Queens, New York City. His parents were Rosalie Russell, a Scottish immigrant, and Paul Wälken, a German immigrant who owned and operated Walken's Bakery in Astoria. Walken was named after actor Ronald Colman. He was raised Methodist. He and his brothers, Kenneth and Glenn, were child actors on television in the 1950s, influenced by their mother's dreams of stardom.

When he was 15, a girlfriend showed Walken a magazine photo of Elvis Presley and Walken later said, "This guy looked like a Greek god. Then I saw him on television. I loved everything about him." He changed his hairstyle to imitate Presley and has not changed it since. As a teenager, he worked for a lion tamer for a short time in a circus.

Walken attended Hofstra University but dropped out after one year, having been cast in the role of Clayton Dutch Miller in an off-Broadway revival of Best Foot Forward alongside Liza Minnelli. Walken initially trained as a dancer at the Washington Dance Studio before moving on to dramatic stage roles and then film.

== Career ==
=== 1950s–1960s ===
As a child, Walken appeared on screen as an extra in numerous anthology series and variety shows during the Golden Age of Television. After appearing in a sketch with Martin and Lewis on The Colgate Comedy Hour, Walken decided to become an actor. He landed a regular role in the 1953 television show Wonderful John Acton, playing the part of Kevin Acton. During this time, he was credited as Ronnie Walken.

Over the next two years, he appeared frequently on television, and had a thriving career in theater. From 1954 to 1956, Walken and his brother Glenn originated the role of Michael Bauer on the soap opera The Guiding Light. In 1963, he appeared as a character named Chris in an episode of Naked City, starring Paul Burke.

He began using Christopher Walken as a professional name after a conversation with the Belgian-American actress and singer Monique van Vooren, with whom he performed as a backup singer and dancer for a "nightclub act". After introducing him at the end of one performance, she told him that she "[didn't] really like 'Ronny' [sic]" and asked if she could call him Christopher, which she felt suited him better. He prefers to be called Chris instead of Christopher.

In 1966, Walken played the role of King Philip of France in the Broadway premiere of The Lion in Winter. In 1968, he played Lysander in A Midsummer Night's Dream and Romeo in Romeo and Juliet at the Stratford Festival in Canada.

He appeared in the made-for-TV movies Barefoot in Athens (1966) and The Three Musketeers (1969), and made his feature film debut in Me and My Brother (1969), a low-budget production that also featured Sam Shepard.

=== 1970s ===
In 1970, Walken guest starred as Navy SP Walt Kramer in Hawaii Five-O season 2 episode 17, "Run, Johnny, Run". Walken also starred in the Off-Broadway production of Lanford Wilson's Lemon Sky opposite Charles Durning and Bonnie Bartlett. Later that year Walken received the Drama Desk Award for Outstanding Performance.

Walken's first major studio film was Sidney Lumet's The Anderson Tapes (1971) with Sean Connery and Dyan Cannon. In 1972's The Mind Snatchers a.k.a. The Happiness Cage, Walken played his first starring role. In this science fiction film, which deals with mind control and normalization, he plays a sociopathic U.S. soldier stationed in Germany.

Paul Mazursky's 1976 film Next Stop, Greenwich Village had Walken, under the name "Chris Walken", playing the charismatic and promiscuous fictional poet Robert Fulmer. In Woody Allen's 1977 film Annie Hall (in which his surname was misspelled "Wlaken" in the end credits), Walken played Duane, the borderline crazy brother of Annie Hall (Diane Keaton). Also in 1977, Walken had a minor role as Eli Wallach's partner in The Sentinel. In 1978, he appeared in Shoot the Sun Down, a western filmed in 1976 that costarred Margot Kidder. Along with Nick Nolte and Burt Reynolds, Walken was considered by George Lucas for the part of Han Solo in Star Wars; the part ultimately went to Harrison Ford. In 1977, Walken also guest-starred in an episode of Kojak as robber Ben Wiley.

Walken won the Academy Award for Best Supporting Actor in Michael Cimino's 1978 film The Deer Hunter, in which he played a Pennsylvania steelworker emotionally destroyed by the Vietnam War. To help achieve his character's gaunt appearance before the third act, Walken consumed only bananas, water and rice for a month.

=== 1980s ===
Walken's first film of the 1980s was the controversial Heaven's Gate, also directed by Cimino. Walken also starred in the 1981 action adventure The Dogs of War, directed by John Irvin. He surprised many critics and filmgoers with his intricate tap-dancing striptease in Herbert Ross's musical Pennies from Heaven (1981). In 1982, he played a socially awkward but gifted theater actor in the film adaptation of Kurt Vonnegut's short story Who Am I This Time? opposite Susan Sarandon. Walken then played schoolteacher-turned-psychic Johnny Smith in David Cronenberg's 1983 adaptation of Stephen King's The Dead Zone. That same year, Walken also starred in Brainstorm alongside Natalie Wood and (in a minor role) his wife, Georgianne.

In 1985, Walken played a James Bond villain, Max Zorin, in A View to a Kill, Roger Moore's last appearance as Bond. Walken dyed his hair blond to befit Zorin's origins as a Nazi experiment.

At Close Range (1986) starred Walken as Brad Whitewood, a rural Pennsylvania crime boss who tries to bring his two sons into his empire; his character was mostly based on criminal Bruce Johnston.

In 1988, Walken played a memorable role as Sgt. Merwin J. Toomey in Neil Simon's Biloxi Blues, which was directed by Mike Nichols, and he played the role of Federal Agent Kyril Montana in The Milagro Beanfield War. He also played the leading role of Whitley Strieber in 1989's Communion, an autobiographical film written by Strieber. It was based on claims that he and his friends were subject to visitations by unknown, other-worldly entities variously identified as "aliens" or "visitors". That same year, Walken appeared in the film Homeboy, which was written by and featured Mickey Rourke in the titular role. In 1989, he played the lead role of "Puss" in the Cannon theater group's musical version of Puss in Boots.

=== 1990s ===
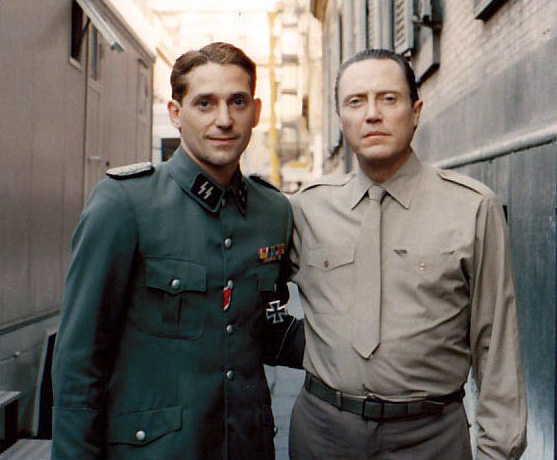
On the set of Celluloide (1996)

The Comfort of Strangers, an art house film directed by Paul Schrader, features Walken as Robert, a decadent Italian aristocrat with extreme sexual tastes and murderous tendencies who lives with his wife (Helen Mirren) in Venice.

King of New York (1990), directed by Abel Ferrara, stars Walken as ruthless New York City drug dealer Frank White, a recently released prisoner set on reclaiming his criminal territory. In 1991, Walken starred in Sarah, Plain and Tall as Jacob Witting, a widowed farmer. In 1992, Walken played villain millionaire industrialist Max Shreck in Batman Returns. In January 1993, he appeared in Madonna's music video for her hit single "Bad Girl" (directed by David Fincher). Walken also played Bobby, Cassandra's producer, in Wayne's World 2.

Walken's next major film role was opposite Dennis Hopper in True Romance, scripted by Quentin Tarantino. Walken later had a supporting role in Tarantino's Pulp Fiction as a Vietnam veteran named Captain Koons.

Later in 1994, Walken starred in A Business Affair, a rare leading role for him in a romantic comedy. Walken manages to once again feature his trademark dancing scene as he performs the tango. In 1995, he appeared in Things to Do in Denver When You're Dead, Wild Side, The Prophecy and the modern vampire flick The Addiction, which was his second collaboration with director Abel Ferrara and writer Nicholas St. John. He also appeared in Nick of Time, which starred Johnny Depp, and an arthouse film by David Salle titled Search and Destroy. Also in 1995, Walken acted in Him, the first play written by Walken, and about his idol Elvis in the afterlife, featured in the New York Shakespeare Festival. The New York Times gave a somewhat positive review of his "most cheering and refreshingly absurd invention" of retelling Presley's death as a disappearing act that enabled him to flee to Morocco for a sex change to become "her" in a "woozily conceived, fantastical new play...in the sharpness and wit of writing and in the performances by Mr. Walken and Mr. Heyman." Walken made an appearance in the music video for Skid Row's "Breakin' Down".

In the 1996 film Last Man Standing, Walken plays a sadistic gangster named Hickey. That year, he played a prominent role in the video game Ripper, portraying Detective Vince Magnotta. Ripper made extensive use of real-time recorded scenes and a wide cast of celebrities in an interactive film. In 1996 Walken also appeared in the Italian film Celluloide as US Officer Rod Geiger and played the role of Ray in the Abel Ferrara crime-drama film The Funeral. In 1997, Walken starred in the comedy films Touch and Excess Baggage and had a minor role in the film Mouse Hunt. He also appeared in the drama/thriller film Suicide Kings, which was also filled with suspense and humor.

In 1998, Walken played an influential gay New York theater critic in John Turturro's film Illuminata. The same year he voiced Colonel/General Cutter in the animated film Antz.

In 1999, he played James Houston in Vendetta, an HBO original film based on the March 14, 1891 New Orleans lynchings. In the same year, Walken appeared in the romantic comedy Blast from the Past portraying Calvin Webber, a brilliant but eccentric Caltech nuclear physicist whose fears of a nuclear war lead him to build an enormous fallout shelter beneath his suburban home. The same year, he appeared as the Headless Horseman in Tim Burton's Sleepy Hollow, starring Johnny Depp and Christina Ricci. He also appeared in Kiss Toledo Goodbye with Michael Rapaport and Nancy Allen.

=== 2000s ===
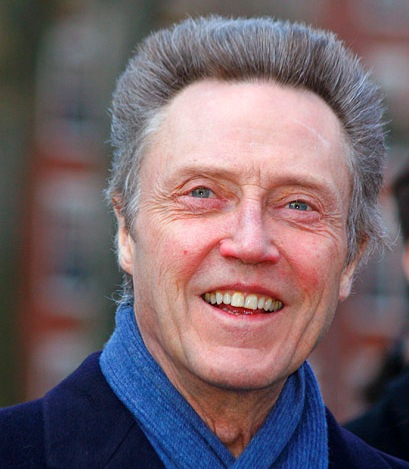
Walken in 2008

In 2000, Walken was cast as the lead, along with Blair Brown, in James Joyce's The Dead on Broadway. A "play with music", The Dead featured music by Shaun Davey, conducted by Charles Prince, with music coordination and percussion by Tom Partington. James Joyce's The Dead ran for 24 previews and 120 performances and won the Tony Award for Best Book for a Musical.

Walken had a music video performance in 2001 with Fatboy Slim's "Weapon of Choice". Directed by Spike Jonze, it won six MTV awards in 2001 and—in a list of the top 100 videos of all time compiled from a survey of musicians, directors and music industry figures conducted by UK music TV channel VH1—won Best Video of All Time in April 2002. In the video, Walken dances and flies around the lobby of the Marriott Hotel in Los Angeles; Walken also helped choreograph the dance. Also in 2001, Walken played a gangster who was in the witness protection program in the David Spade comedy Joe Dirt and an eccentric film director in America's Sweethearts. Also in 2001, Walken played Lieutenant Macduff in Scotland, PA, a loose film adaptation of Shakespeare's Macbeth.

In 2002, Walken played Mike in the film Poolhall Junkies and played Frank Abagnale Sr. in Catch Me If You Can, which is inspired by the story of Frank Abagnale Jr., a con artist who passed himself off as several identities and forged millions of dollars' worth of checks. For his performance, he received a second Academy Award nomination and won a BAFTA and Actor Award. Walken also had a part in the 2003 action comedy film The Rundown, starring Dwayne "The Rock" Johnson and Seann William Scott, in which he plays a ruthless despot. He was nominated for a Razzie (Worst Supporting Actor) in 2002's The Country Bears and in two 2003 films, Gigli and Kangaroo Jack. Walken also starred in Barry Levinson's Envy, in which he plays J-Man, a crazy guy who helps Ben Stiller's character and in his starring role in 2004's Around the Bend he again has a dancing scene as he portrays an absentee father who has fled prison to reunite with his father, his son and the grandson he never knew before dying. Walken played the role of Paul Rayburn in 2004's Man on Fire, where, when speaking about the imminent destructive actions of John Creasy (Denzel Washington), his character states: "A man can be an artist... in anything, food, whatever. It depends on how good he is at it. Creasy's art is death. He's about to paint his masterpiece." Also in 2004, Walken played Mike in the film The Stepford Wives.

In 2005, he played Mark Heiss in the film Domino and the role of Secretary Cleary in the film Wedding Crashers. In 2006, he played Morty, a sympathetic inventor who is more than meets the eye, in the comedy/drama Click and also appeared in Man of the Year with Robin Williams and Lewis Black. He co-starred in the 2007 film adaptation Hairspray, wherein he is seen singing and dancing in a romantic duet with John Travolta and portrayed the eccentric but cruel crime lord and Ping-Pong enthusiast Feng in the 2007 comedy action film Balls of Fury opposite Dan Fogler. Walken was in the film Five Dollars a Day (2008), in which he plays a con man proud of living like a king on $5 a day. The Maiden Heist, a comedy co-starring Morgan Freeman, William H. Macy and Walken about security guards in an art museum, debuted at the Edinburgh International Film Festival in 2009.

Walken also starred in Universal Studios Florida's "Disaster!" theme park attraction, which opened in 2008 and closed in 2015. He portrayed Frank Kincaid, the fictional CEO of "Disaster Studios" who encouraged guests to be extras in his latest film. In the attraction's pre-show, Walken was projected on a clear screen, much like a life-size hologram and interacted with the live-action talent.

=== 2010s ===
Walken returned to Broadway in Martin McDonagh's play A Behanding in Spokane in 2010 and received a Tony Award nomination for Best Performance by a Leading Actor in a Play. He had a small voice role in NBC sitcom 30 Rock, in the "Audition Day" episode. In 2011, he played the role of Jewish-American loan shark Alex "Shondor" Birns in the film based on the life of gangster Danny Greene, Kill the Irishman. In 2012, Walken reunited with McDonagh for the British-American crime comedy film Seven Psychopaths and also played the founder and leader of a string quartet in A Late Quartet.

Walken costarred with Al Pacino and Alan Arkin in the film Stand Up Guys, a story about aging gangsters out on the town for one last hoorah. He also appeared in The Power of Few. In 2012, Walken was selected as a "GQ" Man of the Year. In 2013, Walken became the protagonist in the campaign "Made From Cool" by Jack & Jones. In 2014, he appeared in Turks & Caicos. Walken appears as Gyp DeCarlo in the 2014 film Jersey Boys. In 2014, Walken played Captain Hook in the NBC production Peter Pan Live! In 2015, Walken starred in the film When I Live My Life Over Again and played the role of Clem for the second time in the David Spade comedy Joe Dirt 2: Beautiful Loser. In 2016, he voiced King Louie in the CGI-live action adaptation of Disney's The Jungle Book, directed by Jon Favreau. He also recorded a cover of Louie's song "I Wan'na Be Like You", which he sings in the film as well as on the soundtrack. Also that year, he appeared in Dexter Fletcher's Eddie the Eagle and Barry Sonnenfeld's Nine Lives. In 2017, Walken replaced Bill Irwin in the role of Walter Tinkler in the critically panned Father Figures. The following year, he played Myron in the Netflix film Irreplaceable You.

=== 2020s ===
In 2021, Walken appeared as Frank in the BBC One/Amazon Prime Video comedy The Outlaws., as well as in the second series broadcast in 2022.

In 2022, he had a supporting role as Burt Goodman, the severed chief of the Optics and Design division in the Apple TV+ series Severance. For his performance, he was nominated for the Primetime Emmy Award for Outstanding Supporting Actor in a Drama Series. Walken next portrayed Emperor Shaddam IV in the 2024 film Dune: Part Two. The film received critical acclaim and SlashFilm wrote: "It's a treat to watch Walken work — he shows up, delivers his ominous lines with a whisper, and wipes the floor with anyone he's acting against. Show 'em how it's done, Christopher Walken."

== Legacy and reputation ==
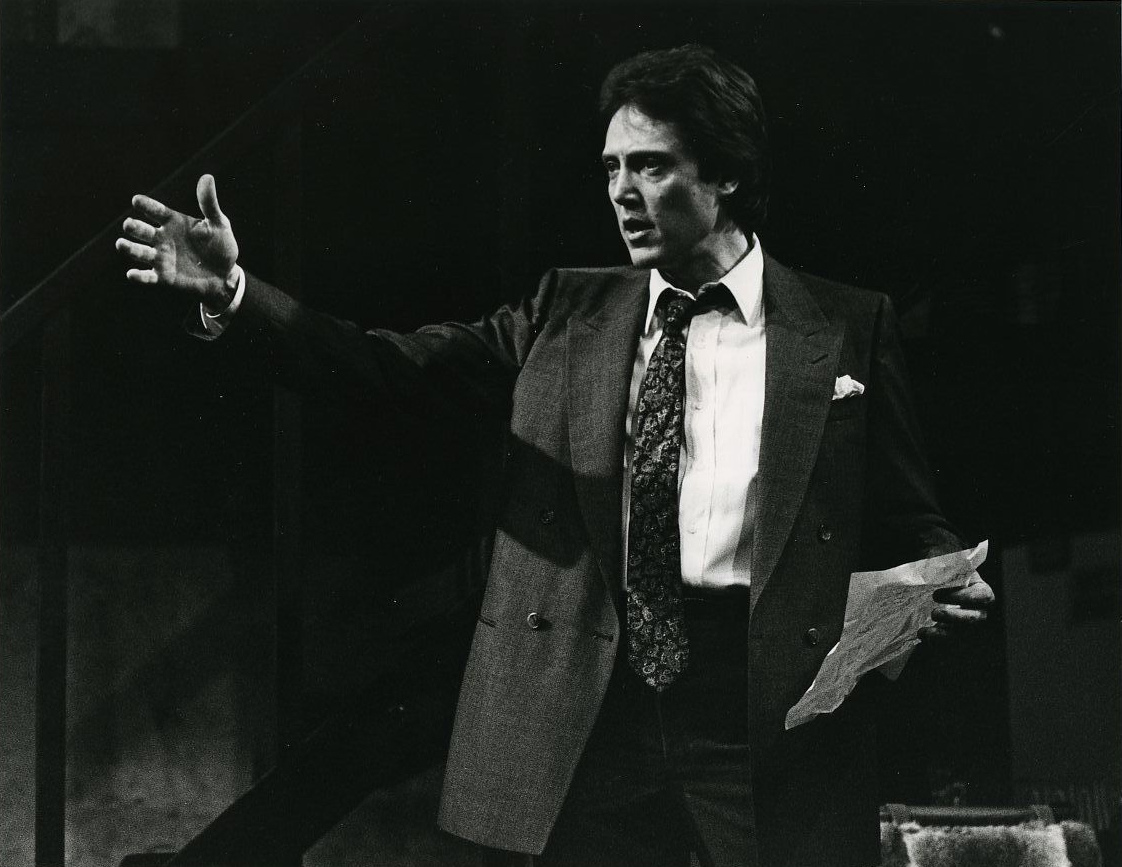
Walken in 1984 stage play Hurlyburly

Described as "diverse and eccentric" and "one of the most respected actors of his generation", Walken has a long-established cult following among film fans. He is known for his versatility and was named as one of Empire magazine's "Top 100 Movie Stars of All Time". Once dubbed a "cultural phenomenon", he has portrayed several iconic film characters including Johnny Smith in The Dead Zone, Max Shreck in Batman Returns, and Max Zorin in A View to a Kill, and was also considered for the role of Han Solo in Star Wars films. His Oscar-winning performance in The Deer Hunter was ranked as the 88th greatest film performance of all time by Premiere magazine and his performance in Pennies from Heaven made it into Entertainment Weekly's list of the "100 Greatest Performances that should have won Oscars but didn't." Sometimes regarded as "one of the kings of cameos", Walken has made several cameo appearances or appeared in single scenes in films, including as Captain Koons in Pulp Fiction, Duane in Annie Hall, Hessian Horseman in Sleepy Hollow and Don Vincenzo in True Romance. Writer and director Quentin Tarantino declared that Walken's involvement in True Romance's "Sicilian scene" was one of the proudest moments in his career.

Benicio del Toro cited Walken as an influence and stated that the best advice he had ever been given regarding acting came from him: "When you're in a scene and you don't know what you're gonna do, don't do anything." Kat Dennings called him her favorite actor and said that he was the reason that she wanted to be an actress. Johnny Depp once said one of the main reasons he starred in Nick of Time was wanting to work with Walken. Jeffrey Wright, Mickey Rourke, Sam Rockwell, Colin Farrell, Bradley Cooper, Leonardo DiCaprio and Mads Mikkelsen are among actors who spoke about their admiration for Walken. Prominent film critic Roger Ebert, who was particularly impressed by his villain and anti-hero portrayals, once stated, "when he is given the right role, there is nobody to touch him for his chilling ability to move between easy charm and pure evil" and called him "one of the few undeniably charismatic male villains."

Walken is noted for refusing film roles only rarely, having stated in interviews that he will decline a role only if he is too busy to accept. He regards each role as a learning experience. A rare example of a role Walken turned down was that of Ray Ruby in the film Go Go Tales (2007). According to film director Abel Ferrara, the character was originally written for Walken, who "didn't want to do it". The role was then given to Walken's New Rose Hotel (1998) co-star Willem Dafoe.

Walken's voice and speaking style have been compared to other entertainment figures with voices that create "a pleasing (or at least entertaining) aural experience," such as William Shatner and Garrison Keillor. Walken believes that the source of his speech stems from growing up with immigrant neighbors who came from everywhere, stating, "The neighborhood itself, you didn't hear a lot of English. Lots of Greek, Italian, Polish, German, Yiddish. I think I grew up listening to people who spoke English in a kind of broken way. I think maybe I talked that way." Walken inspired the stage show, All About Walken: The Impersonators of Christopher Walken, created by actor/comedian Patrick O'Sullivan in Hollywood in 2006.

In 2003, he was voted Number 34 in Channel 4's countdown of the 100 greatest movie stars of all time.

=== Appearances on Saturday Night Live ===
Walken has hosted the comedy sketch and satire TV series Saturday Night Live (SNL) seven times.

One of Walken's SNL performances was a spoof of Behind the Music, featuring a recording session of Blue Öyster Cult's "(Don't Fear) the Reaper". In the guise of record producer Bruce Dickinson (not to be confused with the real Bruce Dickinson, lead singer for Iron Maiden), Walken makes passionate and slightly unhinged speeches to the band and is obsessed with getting "More Cowbell" into the song. The phrase "I gotta have more cowbell" has since been adapted to merchandise. The producer who suggested the cowbell on the original BÖC recording is David Lucas.

Walken appeared in one of Will Ferrell and Rachel Dratch's "The Luvahs" skits. His character brought a lady friend to meet The Luvahs and she is subjected to learning the history that Walken's character shares with The Luvahs. He also divulges private information about his sex life with his girlfriend, much to her horror: "She was willing to accept her lover's body in places no one had ever trespassed... specifically, the ear canal".

Walken spoofed his starring role from The Dead Zone (1983) in a sketch titled "Ed Glosser: Trivial Psychic" (1992). In the film, Walken's character can predict deaths and catastrophes, while Glosser can accurately predict meaningless, trivial future events but with the same emotional intensity as in the film: "You're going to get an ice cream headache. It's going to hurt real bad, right here, [touches forehead] for eight, nine seconds".

His character in A View to a Kill was parodied in a sketch titled "Lease with an Option to Kill", in which he reprised his role as Max Zorin. Zorin, who had taken on some qualities of other Bond villains (Blofeld's cat and suit, Emilio Largo's eye patch), was upset that everything was going wrong for him. His lair was still under construction; his henchmen had jump suits that didn't fit; and his shark tank lacked sharks, having a giant sea sponge instead. A captive James Bond, portrayed by Phil Hartman, offered to get Zorin "a good deal" on the abandoned Blofeld volcanic lair if Zorin let him go, to which he reluctantly agreed.

He performed a song and dance rendition of the Irving Berlin standard, "Let's Face the Music and Dance". Finally, there was the "Colonel Angus" sketch, laden with ribald double entendres, in which Walken played a dishonored Confederate officer.

Until 2003, Walken had a recurring SNL sketch called "The Continental", in which Walken played a "suave ladies' man" who in reality cannot do anything to keep a woman (a neighbor in his apartment building) from giving him the cold shoulder. Though he is outwardly chivalrous, his more perverted tendencies inevitably drive away his date over his pleading objections. For instance, he invites the woman to wash up in his bathroom; once she is inside, it becomes obvious that the bathroom mirror is a two-way mirror when he is seen lighting up a cigarette. In "The Continental", only the hand of his neighbor is ever seen; the camera always shows her point of view.

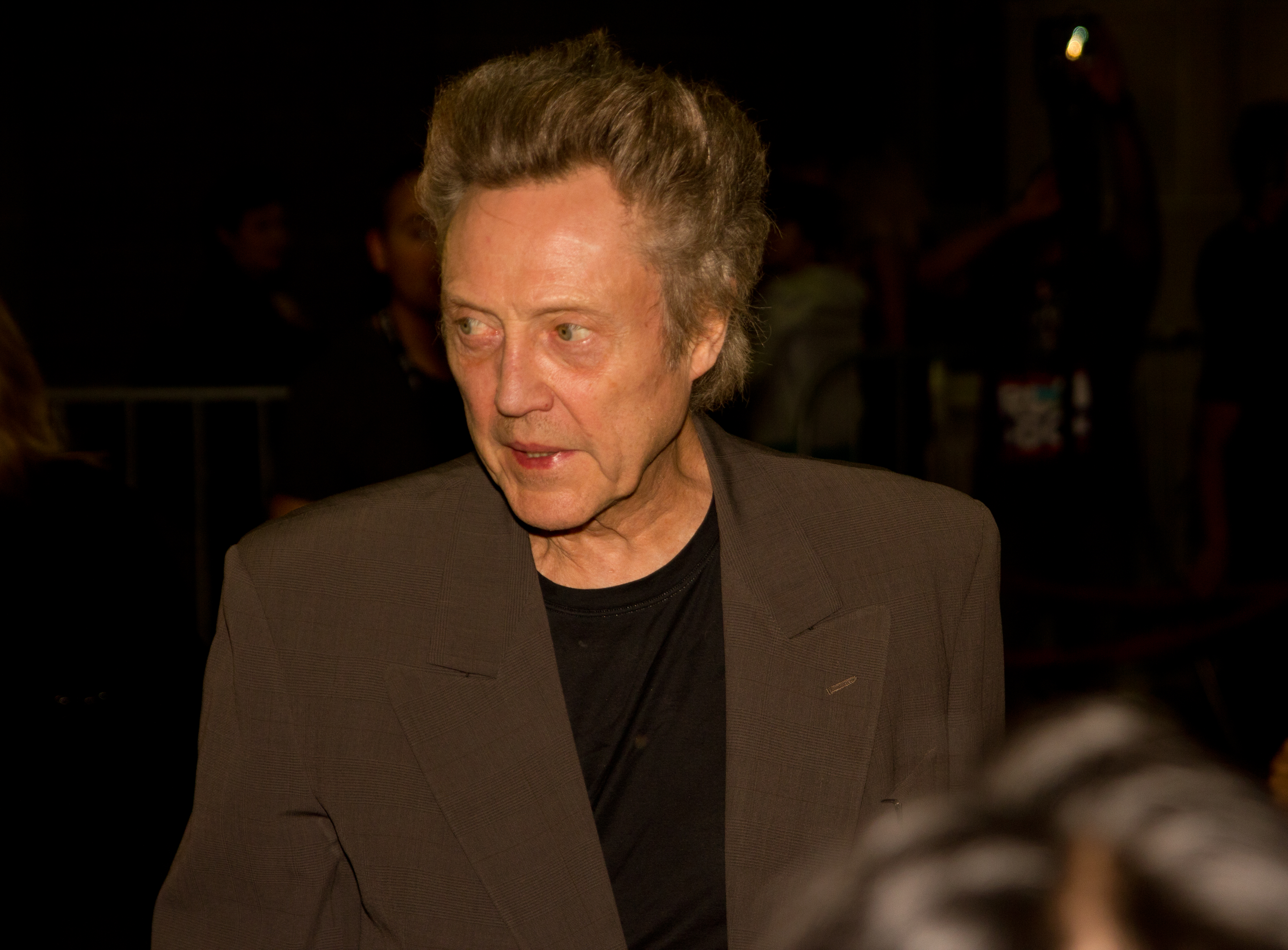
Walken in 2012

The April 5, 2008 Saturday Night Live show was the first time an episode hosted by Walken did not have a "Continental" sketch or a monolog in which he sang and danced. This episode, however, did include one sketch titled "Walken Family Reunion", which spoofs many of Walken's idiosyncrasies. The sketch depicts a fictional Walken family reunion, where all of Christopher's relatives have his mannerisms and speech patterns and sport his trademark pompadour hairstyle. In order of appearance, the other Walkens are Christopher's cousin Stanley (Bill Hader); Stanley's brother John (Jason Sudeikis); John's son Scott (Andy Samberg) and daughter Maxine (Amy Poehler) (who carries a doll that also has a pompadour); Nathan (Fred Armisen), a gay relative for whom "flamboyance" means dressing all in black and running his finger around the rim of a cosmo glass; Uncle Richard (Darrell Hammond) and Aunt Martha (Kristen Wiig), who think that The Deer Hunter was hilarious and who are hosts of a Nigerian foreign exchange student named Oleki (Kenan Thompson). When he came to live with them, Oleki—who has absorbed all of the Walken Family traits—could not speak any English. But now (he says) he "talks like a normal teenaged American boy". The biggest laugh of the sketch occurs when Christopher expresses his sympathies for Scott's teenaged attitude: "I appreciate your situation. For a Walken, adolescence is a difficult time. You feel like you're the only normal person in a school full of nutjobs." Scott's response: "Wow! It's like you're lookin' right into my noggin!" (Will Forte also appears as a waiter at the beginning of the sketch, but does not do a Walken impression.)

In September 2004, SNL released a DVD titled The Best of Christopher Walken through Lionsgate.

Walken returned to the show for the first time in 15 years on October 28, 2023, in a cameo role as the "Spirit of Halloween" in which he gave advice to President Joe Biden (Mikey Day). Walken also introduced the musical guest Foo Fighters instead of host Nate Bargatze. Foo Fighters were the musical guest during his 2003 episode, during which Dave Grohl pranked Walken into speaking with the emphasis on "Fighters" instead of "Foo". Clips of the introduction later became an internet meme and Walken pronounced the band's name correctly in 2023.

=== Presidential candidacy hoax ===
Walken became the subject of a hoax controversy in 2006, when a fake website started in August of that year by members of Internet forum Genmay.com announced that he was running for President of the United States. Some believed it was authentic, until Walken's publicist dismissed the claims. When asked about the hoax in a September 2006 interview with Conan O'Brien, Walken said he was amused and when asked to come up with a campaign slogan, he replied, "What the Heck" and "No More Zoos!"

== Personal life ==
Walken met Georgianne Thon in 1963 during a tour of West Side Story in Chicago. He played Riff and she played Graziella, Riff's girlfriend. They married in New York City in January 1969. The couple have no children and Walken has stated in interviews that not having children is one of the reasons he has had such a prolific career.

Walken discussed his feelings on sexuality in a 1973 interview with After Dark while promoting his appearance as Bassanio in The Merchant of Venice. "I suppose I think of the man I'm playing as bisexual, and I suppose that's how I think of myself too. I'd hate to think that I was harnessed to heterosexuality. I mean, my life is heterosexual, but I like to think that my head is bisexual, and I think it's a good idea for everybody to start getting used to that notion, because that way one becomes aware of a lot more things."

On November 29, 1981, Walken was with Natalie Wood and Robert Wagner on Wagner's yacht the night Wood went missing and ultimately was found dead by drowning. Walken was not considered a suspect by authorities. The case was re-opened in November 2011; Walken was once again not considered a suspect and he fully co-operated with authorities conducting the investigation.

In a 2025 interview with The Wall Street Journal, Walken said, "I don't have technology. I only have a satellite dish on my house. So I've seen Severance on DVDs that they're good enough to send me. I don't have a cell phone. I've never emailed or, what do you call it, Twittered."
