= The Doctor (Once Upon a Time) =

- Once Upon a Time episode
- Episode no.: Season 2 Episode 5
- Directed by: Paul Edwards
- Written by: Edward Kitsis; Adam Horowitz
- Original air date: October 28, 2012

Guest appearances
- David Anders as Dr. Victor Frankenstein/Dr. Whale; Noah Bean as Daniel; Sarah Bolger as Princess Aurora; Jamie Chung as Mulan; Colin O'Donoghue as Captain Killian "Hook" Jones; Raphael Sbarge as Jiminy Cricket/Dr. Archie Hopper; Sebastian Stan as The Mad Hatter/Jefferson

Episode chronology
← Previous "The Crocodile"	Next → "Tallahassee"
- Once Upon a Time season 2

"The Doctor" is the fifth episode of the second season of the American ABC fantasy/drama television series Once Upon a Time, and the show's 27th episode overall, which aired on October 28, 2012.

In this episode, Daniel is brought back to life; Emma, Snow, Aurora, and Mulan meet Captain Hook; and in the past, Regina hires Dr. Frankenstein to bring Daniel back to life.

It was co-written by Edward Kitsis and Adam Horowitz and directed by Paul Edwards.

== Title card ==
A lightning storm strikes in the Enchanted Forest.

== Plot ==
=== Event Chronology ===
The Enchanted Forest events happen after "We Are Both" and before "Quite a Common Fairy". The Storybrooke events happen after "Broken (Once Upon a Time)".

=== In the Characters' Past ===
In the Enchanted Forest, Rumplestiltskin (Robert Carlyle) is preparing to teach Regina (Lana Parrilla) everything she needs to know about magic. It is not as easy as it seems, especially after she struggles to take the heart out of a unicorn. She protests over doing this, but he tells Regina, "Nothing is innocent", before taking the unicorn's heart out himself. He also tells her not even magic will bring her fiancé Daniel (Noah Bean) back to life. The Mad Hatter/Jefferson (Sebastian Stan) later arrives to overhear the two and shows off a crystal ball that Rumplestiltskin has requested. Rumplestiltskin, however, had told the Mad Hatter that he actually needs "the slippers" to enter a realm with no magic, since the Mad Hatter's hat can only travel between realms with magic. Now that they meet for the first time, Jefferson tells Regina he has heard of a "wizard" who can help her bring back Daniel. They travel to see this person, who prefers to be called a doctor (David Anders). As he examines Daniel's body, the doctor tells Regina that he is an ideal candidate for his "experimental" procedure, though, he still needs an enchanted heart, as normal ones cannot withstand the procedure. Regina lets him pick one from Cora's vault of living hearts. That night, the doctor begins his work on restoring Daniel to life, but announces his failure. This devastates Regina, who returns to being Rumplestiltskin's pupil and demonstrates her readiness by ripping the heart out of his new protégée, crushing it to prove her advancement. It is revealed that Rumplestiltskin was actually in league with the doctor, who exchanged the strong heart for the "monster" he got in Regina, and the Mad Hatter, who allowed him safe passage back to his world, the Land Without Color. Before departing, Rumplestiltskin and the Mad Hatter scoff at the doctor's claims that science is more powerful than magic. Rumplestiltskin bets that the doctor will one day see things his way, much to the doctor's doubts.

It is later revealed that the doctor took the strong heart Regina gave him back to his laboratory, where he hands over the prized possession to his assistant and places it inside the body of the doctor's dead brother so he can bring him back to life. The doctor is revealed to be Victor Frankenstein, and that he relies on science, not magic.

=== In the Enchanted Forest ===
As Emma Swan (Jennifer Morrison), Snow White/Mary Margaret (Ginnifer Goodwin), Mulan (Jamie Chung) and Aurora (Sarah Bolger) return to the island from the castle, the foursome discover that everyone at the camp has been killed and their hearts ripped out by Cora. However, they discover Captain Hook/Killian Jones (Colin O'Donoghue) hiding among the bodies. Hook claims that he was the only survivor and pretends to act like a traumatized victim in an effort to gain their trust. However, Emma is suspicious of his claim, and is convinced that he is lying about the attack. She ties him to a tree and threatens to leave him to the ogres if he does not confess; Hook finally comes clean and reveals his identity along with Cora's plans to travel to Storybrooke. Hook then tells the four women that Cora is searching for an enchanted compass that he will help them find, so they could get back to Storybrooke if they take him back with them. Emma asks him why, and Hook reveals that it is so he can kill Rumplestiltskin. While Snow senses that Hook is using this plan to throw them off, Emma is aware of Hook's deception, knowing that as long as they don't trust him, they won't be surprised if he double-crosses them. The five individuals then prepare for their quest to search for the compass, which happens to be located at the top of an enormous beanstalk.

=== In Storybrooke ===
Dr. Whale/Victor Frankenstein approaches Prince Charming/David Nolan (Josh Dallas), who then punches him for sleeping with Snow White/Mary Margaret. Dr. Whale asks David if there may be a chance that they could find another portal that could lead them to another world, and hopefully find Dr. Whale's missing brother. Dr. Whale suspects that Regina may have the answer. Meanwhile, Regina is visiting Jiminy Cricket/Dr. Archie Hopper (Raphael Sbarge) for a series of sessions to let go of using her magic so she can see Henry (Jared S. Gilmore) again. Dr. Whale bursts into Archie's office and confronts Regina during her session to demand that she send him back to his world so he can find his brother. Regina, however, tells Archie that she only brought along whom she wanted, including the body of her beloved Daniel that she preserved with a spell. Later that night, while driving home in the rain, Regina sees whom she believes is Daniel roaming the streets, then finds his glass coffin empty, leading her to believe that Dr. Whale is behind this. As Regina arrives at the hospital to confront the doctor, she sees him on the lab floor with his arm ripped off. Dr. Whale confesses to Regina that he has brought Daniel back, but he has become a "monster." The following morning, David confronts Regina at the hospital; she tells him about what Dr. Whale did, and David reveals that he knows what Snow White/Mary Margaret did to her that started this immense hatred. Regina suggests to David that the resurrected Daniel is reliving his last thoughts and probably has gone to the stables. Unfortunately, Henry is also there, tending to the new horse that David gave him.

At the stables, Daniel finds Henry and begins to strangle him, believing that Henry is Cora trying to pull his heart out. David and Regina stop him before he can do any harm, allowing Henry to escape. David locks Daniel in the stable; he is ready to kill Daniel with his gun, but Regina insists she can talk to him. She manages to get as far as pulling the "real Daniel" out long enough for him to urge her to stop the pain, and let go of their feelings for each other. Just as he loses control and attempts to kill Regina, she tearfully immobilizes him, then vaporizes him. Later, Regina returns to Archie, confessing that she has used magic. Dr. Whale shows up at Mr. Gold's pawn shop to get his arm reattached. Rumplestiltskin/Mr. Gold makes him first admit that he needs magic to prove to Whale that magic is superior to science; after he magically reattaches his arm, Dr. Whale thanks him and leaves.

== Production ==
"The Doctor" was co-written by executive producers Edward Kitsis and Adam Horowitz, while Lost veteran Paul Edwards served as director. David Anders was persuaded to take the part of Dr. Whale after discovering his counterpart would be Dr. Frankenstein, though it took the series a year to reveal Whale's fairytale counterpart. Anders drew inspiration from Gene Wilder and the film Young Frankenstein.

This episode marks the final appearance by actor Sebastian Stan as the Mad Hatter/Jefferson. He departed the series due to his obligations to the Broadway play Picnic and the Marvel Studios feature film Captain America: The Winter Soldier.

== Cultural references ==
- Victor Frankenstein and his "monster" are the primary characters from Mary Shelley's novel Frankenstein, which was written in 1818. While the story of Victor Frankenstein originates in the novel, the more well known version, (and the one alluded to in the episode, i.e. black & white) is the classic 1931 horror film Frankenstein. Such references include the use of lightning to bring the monster back to life (a process not detailed in the book), a bad heart (in the movie, brain) causing the monster to go bad, a lab assistant (a hunchback in the movies, while in the novel, Victor worked alone in secret), and the famous line "it's alive!" Also, Dr. Whale's arm is ripped out of its socket by Daniel, just like the police inspector in Son of Frankenstein. Frankenstein's Storybrooke name of Whale is a reference to James Whale, who directed Frankenstein and its 1935 sequel, Bride of Frankenstein.
- The Wizard of Oz is briefly alluded to near the start of the episode when Jefferson gives Rumplestiltskin a crystal ball in lieu of the slippers he was sent to find. Jefferson says the slippers had "been sent to another land" to which Rumplestiltskin replies, "I needed the slippers to 'get' to that other land."
- Among other references to Lost on the series (Kitsis and Horowitz, the creators of this series were producers on Lost), in this episode Rumplestiltskin tells Regina that "Dead is dead", the title of a Lost episode.

== Reception ==
=== Ratings ===
For the second week in a row (in spite of fears that Hurricane Sandy would affect the Eastern United States, which would've caused ABC affiliates to preempt the show if it became serious), this outing helped the series post another increase in the ratings, scoring a 3.4/8 among 18-49s with 9.7 million viewers tuning in, despite the competition it had from NBC's Sunday Night Football and Fox's broadcast of Game 4 of the 2012 World Series.

=== Reviews ===
The episode was met with mixed to positive reviews from critics.

Entertainment Weekly's Hilary Busis liked the episode, but somehow questioned the show creators' sudden inclusion of characters that were written in the 1800s into the storylines: "Maybe it's best not to anger the all-powerful sorcerers. Instead, let's talk about their televised creation: 'The Doctor,' which revealed that Dr. Whale was once known as Dr. Horrible—I mean, Dr. Victor Frankenstein. Though I know that not all of Once's 'fairy land' characters actually hail from folklore—like Frankenstein, Pinocchio and the Mad Hatter are both inventions of 19th century novelists—I've still got mixed feelings about bringing Mary Shelley's classic into OUAT's potent public domain stew. If any and all stories are fair game, where will the show's writers draw the line? Will future episodes feature Emma befriending Elizabeth Bennet and Jo March, then trying to reunite Romeo and Juliet? It just seems like expanding the show's world beyond fairy tales and Disney properties—like Captain Hook—has the potential to turn Once into a giant, fanfiction-y mess."

The Huffington Post's Laura Prudom also gave it mixed reviews: "This week's 'Once Upon a Time' certainly fit in with the rest of ABC's Halloween fare, with an abundance of lightning and shambling monsters and creepy heart stealing—but the end result left me a little cold."

The A.V. Club gave the episode a B: "With Halloween just around the corner, Once Upon A Time tries its hand at a spooky Regina-centric episode that not only features some considerable character development, but also moves the plot forward," and added that "it’s a solid episode that incorporates much of this series’ rapidly expanding cast, and it poses some interesting questions about the nature of this show's alternate worlds."

TV Overmind had reservations about this episode, noting that "this week's Once Upon a Time finally revealed Dr. Whale's true identity, but that discovery - and the story that played out in Storybrooke - made for a bit of a strange episode. While it's always nice to get insight into the emotions of the characters, the truth is that what happened in Regina's Storybrooke arc in this episode didn't really move the overall plot forward.

IGN's Amy Ratcliffe called the episode "great," giving it an 8.0 out of 10. She highly favored the storyline between Regina and Rumplestiltskin. She also praised David Anders performance as Dr. Frankenstein, calling him "fantastically creepy."
