= The Crocodile (Once Upon a Time) =

- Once Upon a Time episode
- Episode no.: Season 2 Episode 4
- Directed by: David Solomon
- Written by: David H. Goodman; Robert Hull
- Original air date: October 21, 2012

Guest appearances
- Lee Arenberg as Grumpy/Leroy; Chris Gauthier as William Smee; Barbara Hershey as Cora; Eric Keenleyside as Sir Maurice/Moe French; Colin O'Donoghue as Captain Killian "Hook" Jones; Rachel Shelley as Milah

Episode chronology
← Previous "Lady of the Lake"	Next → "The Doctor"
- Once Upon a Time season 2

"The Crocodile" is the fourth episode of the second season of the American ABC fantasy/drama television series Once Upon a Time, and the show's 26th episode overall, which aired on October 21, 2012.

It was co-written by David H. Goodman and Robert Hull, while being directed by David Solomon.

In this episode, Mr. Gold, David, and Ruby go searching for a missing Belle, while flashbacks show Rumpelstiltskin's past with Captain Hook.

== Title card ==
Captain Hook's ship, The Jolly Roger, sails beyond the Enchanted Forest.

== Plot ==
=== In the Characters' Past ===
As Rumplestiltskin (Robert Carlyle) returns home, he discovers Baelfire is all alone. Realizing that his wife, Milah (Rachel Shelley), has gone down to a village pub, Rumplestiltskin and Baelfire decide to confront her there, only to discover that Milah has been drinking with a group of pirates. It turns out that Milah is not happy with being married to Rumplestiltskin because she sees him as a coward, but Baelfire manages to convince her to return home. Unfortunately, the next day, Rumplestiltskin learns that Milah has been abducted by the pirates. He arrives at their ship to meet Killian Jones (Colin O'Donoghue), the captain of the vessel, and asks that he turn Milah over to him. Killian then offers Rumplestiltskin a chance to duel him, only to let Rumplestiltskin's cowardice get the best of him. Several years later, Rumplestiltskin, now the Dark One, sits at a tavern where he is approached by a black market trader about a magic bean that can transport between worlds. Before that transaction can take place, Jones shows up, and as expected, Rumplestiltskin decides to confront him once again.

At the area near the docks, Rumplestiltskin pretends to be an old beggar, and Jones nicknames him 'Crocodile' after his scaly appearance. Upon learning who he is, Jones tells Rumplestiltskin that Milah died years ago, so the two decide on a sword fight to the finish with Rumplestiltskin gaining the upper hand and finally defeating Jones. But just as he was about to use his power to rip Jones's heart out, Milah appears. It turned out that Milah was never dead and was living among the pirates as Jones's lover. She asks that their lives be spared in exchange for the bean, which she took from the trader. Aboard Jones' ship, the Jolly Roger, Milah explains that she wanted a life of adventure over Rumplestiltskin, who was upset that she would leave both him and their son behind. Milah does admit that she regrets leaving Baelfire but allowed her hatred of staying with Rumpelstiltskin to prevent her from thinking about Bae. Milah then throws the bean to Killian so Rumplestiltskin would keep his promise, but a furious Rumplestiltskin decides to make them pay by ripping her heart out and killing her instantly, followed by slicing off Jones's left hand, believing that he had the bean in his fist. Rumplestiltskin declares he wants Jones to suffer as he did, so he leaves him alive. Killian then stabs Rumplestiltskin with a hook, but to no effect, as the Dark One is immortal. Jones vows to find a way to kill Rumplestiltskin, who doubts he will even live long enough to try. "The Crocodile" takes Jones's left hand and disappears in a puff of smoke, leaving the hook behind. As it turns out, Rumplestiltskin was once again tricked by Jones, who kept the bean in the other hand, then brought out the kidnapped black market trader to make sure the bean worked and after throwing it into the ocean, a portal opened up. Jones swears vengeance against Rumplestiltskin, and attaches the hook to his left arm stump, revealing that he is none other than Captain Hook. Revealing his name to be William Smee, the trader agrees to join Hook's crew as they prepare to enter the portal for a place where the crew will not age, so Hook can discover how to get his revenge on Rumplestiltskin; a place called Neverland.

=== In Storybrooke ===
At Mr. Gold's mansion, Belle (Emilie de Ravin), who after having a nightmare in which Gold gives her a necklace only to see him transform into Rumplestiltskin and choke Leroy (Lee Arenberg), sees him spinning gold and mixing potions in the basement. The following morning, Belle demands Mr. Gold to come clean as to why he was doing this. When he refuses to explain why, Belle leaves him, prompting an upset Gold to turn to David (Josh Dallas) for help. As they search the town for Belle, the residents refuse to assist them. They decide to visit Belle's father, Moe French (Eric Keenleyside), at his home, but they come away empty-handed, not forgetting what happened during Maurice's previous encounter with Rumplestiltskin. Unaware to both David and Gold, Belle was actually hiding out at Granny's where she made fast friends with Ruby (Meghan Ory). Belle expressed her need for a job, so Ruby suggests that, given Belle's love for books, she should reopen the boarded-up Storybrooke Public Library and become the town's newest librarian. Unfortunately, after leaving the diner en route to the library, she is kidnapped by William Smee (Chris Gauthier), who had been hired by Moe to take Belle to the mines and to have her memory erased once they arrived at the city limits in order to make her forget about Gold. But thanks to Ruby's ability to trace Belle's scent, David, Gold and Ruby reach Belle in time and stop Moe from going through with his plan with the help of Mr. Gold's magic. Belle is grateful that Gold saved her, however, she is still angry with both her father and Gold and tells the two that she never wants to speak to either of them again.

Later on that day, Ruby gives Belle a gift that had been distributed to her. When Belle opens the small box, she finds the keys to the library inside. As she opens the place up, Belle sees Gold (who gave her the keys) inside, despite the warning she gave him back at the mine. He tells Belle that he came to apologize to her and to explain the real reason why he created the curse in the first place, which was to find Baelfire and to hopefully overcome his life as being a cowardly person through magic. Gold had hoped that once the curse was broken, he would be able to find his son beyond Storybrooke. However, since nobody can leave the town, he was hoping to find a way to break that curse as well. As Belle and Gold make up, now that she has forgiven him, and promise to have a hamburger together, it turns out that Gold has already kept one detail from Belle. He has bound and locked William Smee in his basement. Smee readily answers Gold's questions, but is unable to provide him with Killian Jones's location in Storybrooke since it appears that he hasn't been trapped in Storybrooke.

=== In the Enchanted Forest ===
On an isolated beach, Jones, now known as Captain Hook, surveys the survivors' island refuge. After a moment, he is met by Cora (Barbara Hershey), who has brought the ashes of the wardrobe. They discuss their plan to try to make it to Storybrooke to go after Regina and Rumplestiltskin.

== Production ==
"The Crocodile" was co-written by producer Robert Hull and co-executive producer David H. Goodman, while Nikita veteran David Solomon served as director. Emma Swan (Jennifer Morrison), Snow White/Mary Margaret (Ginnifer Goodwin), and Regina (Lana Parrilla) do not appear in this episode.

== Cultural references ==
In the J. M. Barrie play and novel Peter Pan, Captain Hook's hand was cut off by the title character and fed to a crocodile, which had also swallowed a clock, alerting Hook to its presence. In this episode, Hook refers to Rumpelstiltskin as a crocodile because of his appearance (he also sports an alligator skin vest). Rather than having swallowed a clock, Rumplestiltskin uses the phrase "tick tock" repeatedly in his encounter with Captain Jones.

== Reception ==
=== Ratings ===
This outing provided a boost in the ratings for the series, earning a 3.3/8 among 18-49s with 9.89 million viewers tuning in, making this the second most watched episode in the show's second season behind "Broken."

=== Reviews ===
The episode was met with excellent reviews.

Entertainment Weekly's Hilary Busis had high remarks for this outing, especially about the performance of Colin O'Donoghue, who was just added to the main cast even though he was a guest star in this installment: "Admit it: You let out a little squeal of glee when that pirate ship came lurching out of the shadows during tonight's title card. A guyliner-festooned Captain Hook just has that effect on people. What else can explain how the pirate garnered a die-hard fan base of 'hookers' weeks before he officially appeared on Once? (Word to the wise: Do not Google 'once upon a time hookers' unless you're prepared to deal with the consequences)."

The A.V. Club gave the episode a B, noting that "this episode does for Rumpelstiltskin what 'We Are Both' did for Regina, putting him on the path to redemption when his relationship with Belle falls apart."

The Inquister noted that this episode "continued to show why this is one of the most popular dramas on TV. Tonight was full of the action and romance fans come back every week for—and we even got to meet another new character (who happens to be totally hot, just saying)."

Amy Ratcliffe of IGN gave it a 9.5: "Last night’s episode of 'Once Upon a Time' featured love, swashbuckling, revenge, and Belle being completely lovable. In other words, it was pretty fantastic."
