= Once Upon a Time season 2 =

Once Upon a Time
- Season 2
- DVD cover
- Starring: Ginnifer Goodwin; Jennifer Morrison; Lana Parrilla; Josh Dallas; Emilie de Ravin; Jared S. Gilmore; Meghan Ory; Robert Carlyle; Colin O'Donoghue
- No. of episodes: 22

Release
- Original network: ABC
- Original release: September 30, 2012 – May 12, 2013

Season chronology
- ← Previous; Season 1 Next → Season 3

The second season of the American ABC fantasy-drama series Once Upon a Time was announced on May 10, 2012. It premiered on September 30, 2012, and concluded on May 12, 2013. Ginnifer Goodwin, Jennifer Morrison, Lana Parrilla, Josh Dallas, Jared S. Gilmore, and Robert Carlyle return as principal cast members from the first season, and are joined by Emilie de Ravin, Meghan Ory, and Colin O'Donoghue. This season is the only one to feature Ory in a regular capacity.

The season's plot follows the breaking of the curse and the introduction of magic by Rumplestiltskin / Mr. Gold (Carlyle) into Storybrooke in the first season finale, with the characters having to deal with their dual identities and new emerging threats. Existing fictional characters introduced to the series during the season include Captain Hook (O'Donoghue), Princess Aurora, Mulan, Prince Phillip, Robin Hood, the Darling family, and the Lost Boys.

== Premise ==
With the curse broken, the residents of Storybrooke struggle with resolving their original and cursed memories, left wondering about the fate of their land. When Rumplestiltskin / Mr. Gold successfully introduces magic into the real world, some of the Storybrooke residents try to figure out how to return home, leading to an incident with the Mad Hatter's teleporting hat that causes Emma and Snow White / Mary Margaret to be accidentally transported to the Enchanted Forest. They discover that part of the realm was spared from the curse, keeping the remaining inhabitants frozen during the 28 years. Among them are allies Aurora and Mulan, along with enemies Regina's mother Cora and Captain Hook. The latter two follow Emma and Mary Margaret as they successfully make it back to Storybrooke, with Cora wanting to get even with Regina, and Hook wanting to kill Rumplestiltskin for taking his hand and his lover. Meanwhile, Rumplestiltskin works to bypass the protective boundary and leave Storybrooke to find his missing son Baelfire, who is revealed to be Henry's father. The magical boundary around Storybrooke starts to falter, allowing strangers from the outside world to enter the town, including outsiders Greg Mendell and Tamara, both of whom secretly working for a mysterious organization tracking and eliminating magic. Their actions lead to Henry's captivity in Neverland, setting up the third season.

== Cast and characters ==
=== Main ===
- Ginnifer Goodwin as Snow White / Mary Margaret Blanchard
- Jennifer Morrison as Emma Swan
- Lana Parrilla as Regina Mills / Evil Queen
- Josh Dallas as David Nolan / Prince Charming (Note: Dallas also portrays Prince James, David's twin brother, in "Tiny")
- Emilie de Ravin as Belle / Lacey
- Jared S. Gilmore as Henry Mills
- Meghan Ory as Red Riding Hood / Ruby
- Robert Carlyle as Rumplestiltskin / Mr. Gold
- Colin O'Donoghue as Killian Jones / Captain Hook (Note: Credited as a recurring guest star from "The Crocodile" to "Tiny" and later promoted to the main cast from "Manhattan")

=== Recurring ===
- Lee Arenberg as Grumpy / Leroy
- Michael Raymond-James as Baelfire / Neal Cassidy
- Beverley Elliott as Widow Lucas / Granny
- Barbara Hershey as Cora / Queen of Hearts
- Jeffrey Kasier as Dopey
- Michael Coleman as Happy
- Mig Macario as Bashful
- Faustino Di Bauda as Sleepy / Walter
- David Paul Grove as Doc
- Sarah Bolger as Aurora
- Ethan Embry as Owen Flynn / Greg Mendell
- Jamie Chung as Mulan
- Keegan Connor Tracy as The Blue Fairy / Mother Superior
- Raphael Sbarge as Jiminy Cricket / Dr. Archie Hopper
- Sonequa Martin-Green as Tamara
- David Anders as Dr. Victor Frankenstein / Dr. Whale
- Gabe Khouth as Sneezy / Tom Clark
- Tony Amendola as Geppetto / Marco
- Chris Gauthier as Mr. Smee
- Alan Dale as King George / Albert Spencer
- Jorge Garcia as Anton / Tiny
- Sebastian Stan as The Mad Hatter / Jefferson
- Julian Morris as Prince Phillip

=== Guest ===
- Bailee Madison as Young Snow White
- Rachel Shelley as Milah
- Eion Bailey as August Booth / Pinocchio
- Tony Perez as Henry
- Dylan Schmidt as Young Baelfire
- Jamie Dornan as Huntsman / Sheriff Graham Humbert
- Tom Ellis as Robin Hood / Thief
- Freya Tingley as Wendy Darling
- Parker Croft as Felix
- Gabrielle Rose as Ruth
- Eric Keenleyside as Sir Maurice / Moe French
- Noah Bean as Daniel Colter
- Rose McGowan as Young Cora
- Sinqua Walls as Sir Lancelot
- Annabeth Gish as Anita Lucas
- Ben Hollingsworth as Quinn
- Gregory Itzin as Alphonse Frankenstein
- Chad Michael Collins as Gerhardt Frankenstein
- Cassidy Freeman as Jack
- Lesley Nicol as Johanna
- Rena Sofer as Queen Eva
- Joaquim de Almeida as King Xavier
- John Pyper-Ferguson as Kurt Flynn
- Benjamin Stockham as Young Owen Flynn
- Tzi Ma as the Dragon
- Wil Traval as Sheriff of Nottingham / Keith

== Episodes ==
| No. overall | No. in season | Title | Directed by | Written by | Original release date | US viewers (millions) |
|---|---|---|---|---|---|---|
| 23 | 1 | "Broken" | Ralph Hemecker | Edward Kitsis & Adam Horowitz | September 30, 2012 | 11.36 |
Emma tries to help her family maneuver past the consequences of magic in Our World, and Gold's plan to exact vengeance against Regina threatens to jeopardize his standing with Belle. Meanwhile, a series of events are revealed in which a young princess becomes caught in the middle of a dangerous quest that pits her true love and his enigmatic traveling companion against a sinister creature out for blood.
| 24 | 2 | "We Are Both" | Dean White | Jane Espenson | October 7, 2012 | 9.84 |
Regina searches for a way to regain her powers, and David struggles to maintain order after learning what happens when someone crosses the town line. Meanwhile, flashbacks show Regina meeting Rumplestiltskin for the first time.
| 25 | 3 | "Lady of the Lake" | Milan Cheylov | Andrew Chambliss & Ian Goldberg | October 14, 2012 | 9.45 |
Emma and Mary Margaret, with the help of Mulan, Princess Aurora, and Sir Lancelot, look for the magical wardrobe that sent Emma to Storybrooke, hoping that it has enough magic to do the same for them. In the Enchanted Forest's past, King George curses Snow White on the eve of meeting Prince Charming's mother.
| 26 | 4 | "The Crocodile" | David Solomon | David H. Goodman & Robert Hull | October 21, 2012 | 9.89 |
Mr. Gold must change his ways of using magic to destroy people, or face the threat of Belle leaving him. After Belle talks to Ruby, she finds that she could be of some help to the library and sets off to see if she can work there, only to be kidnapped by her father. Mr. Gold, Ruby, and David go on a search for Belle, finding out that her father sent her into the mines so that she would cross the border of Storybrooke underground and because of that forget everything about her life in the Enchanted Forest. In flashbacks, Rumplestiltskin loses his wife to Killian Jones (Captain Hook) and his pirates.
| 27 | 5 | "The Doctor" | Paul Edwards | Edward Kitsis & Adam Horowitz | October 28, 2012 | 9.85 |
Regina goes to Dr. Hopper to see if he can help her to not use magic anymore, so that she can get Henry back. Later on in the night she sees her old fiance, Daniel, while driving home. She goes to see Dr. Whale only to find him having been attacked, who then says that he brought Daniel back from the dead, but he is a monster. David decides that Henry should learn how to ride a horse, but soon fears for Henry's life when he and Regina find out that Daniel has gone to the stables. After Regina talks to David, Daniel tells her that she needs to let him go, and Regina removes the preservation spell, destroying his body. After returning to the refugee camp, Emma, Snow, Aurora, and Mulan find only one man is left alive, and he turns out to be Captain Hook. After he tells them Cora's plan, they set out to find another way home. In the past, Jefferson brokers a deal between Rumplestiltskin and Victor Frankenstein.
| 28 | 6 | "Tallahassee" | David M. Barrett | Christine Boylan & Jane Espenson | November 4, 2012 | 10.15 |
Emma follows Hook up a treacherous beanstalk in the hopes of finding a source of power that could bring both her and Mary Margaret back to Storybrooke. Meanwhile, the events surrounding Emma's teenage years are revealed, along with an unexpected encounter involving a thief who wants to make an honest woman out of her.
| 29 | 7 | "Child of the Moon" | Anthony Hemingway | Ian Goldberg & Andrew Chambliss | November 11, 2012 | 8.75 |
Ruby is accused of murdering someone. Spencer is out for revenge. In flashbacks, Red Riding Hood finds a pack of wolves led by she-wolf Anita, who insists she is Red's mother, and that she can help her remember what she does when she turns into a wolf. Spencer convinces the town David is protecting Ruby instead of the town and he forms a mob to go after Ruby. Ruby believes she must have killed her friend and lets herself turn into the wolf but David has found the proof it was Spencer.
| 30 | 8 | "Into the Deep" | Ron Underwood | Kalinda Vazquez & Daniel T. Thomsen | November 25, 2012 | 8.82 |
After Cora finds Captain Hook, she decides she won't be taking him to Storybrooke when she gets the compass back from Snow White. Mulan begins to worry about Aurora when she finds that Aurora has burns on her hand from the fiery room. Mr. Gold, David, and Regina work to make sure that Henry makes it safe back and forth between the worlds. David decides that he is going to go under the sleeping spell to go to the fiery room because of the danger. Cora kidnaps Aurora in an effort to get the compass. Mulan and Emma then send Snow into the fiery room, finding out the way to defeat Cora is hidden in the room they locked Rumplestiltskin in years ago. Captain Hook sets Aurora free to show Emma that she should have trusted him, only for him to take Aurora's heart to convince Cora to take him to Storybrooke with her. Cora uses Aurora's heart to trick Emma, Snow White, and Mulan into believing that Aurora's fine and to find out where they are going. David gets stuck in the Netherworld when Snow isn't able to kiss him to break the curse.
| 31 | 9 | "Queen of Hearts" | Ralph Hemecker | Edward Kitsis & Adam Horowitz | December 2, 2012 | 9.10 |
Regina and Mr. Gold agree that they should destroy anyone who comes through the portal, even if it's Emma and Snow White. Ruby and Leroy get angry when they find that Gold and Regina took the diamonds from the mines, so Henry and Ruby set off to stop them from destroying Emma and Mary Margaret. Cora and Hook face off with Mary Margaret and Emma for the compass, while the events of how Cora and Hook met are revealed.
| 32 | 10 | "The Cricket Game" | Dean White | David H. Goodman & Robert Hull | January 6, 2013 | 9.10 |
Cora frames Regina for a murder, while in the past, Snow and Charming decide to kill the queen.
| 33 | 11 | "The Outsider" | David Solomon | Andrew Chambliss & Ian Goldberg | January 13, 2013 | 8.24 |
Belle meets Hook, while the events of Belle's capture by the queen are revealed.
| 34 | 12 | "In the Name of the Brother" | Milan Cheylov | Jane Espenson | January 20, 2013 | 7.68 |
Dr. Whale goes missing when he has to save the stranger's life; Cora reunites with Regina; and in the past, Victor Frankenstein resurrects his brother.
| 35 | 13 | "Tiny" | Guy Ferland | Christine Boylan & Kalinda Vazquez | February 10, 2013 | 7.08 |
The giant Anton shows up in Storybrooke, he thinks David is James who he hates for destroying his home. Mr. Gold, Emma, and Henry go to the airport on a trip to find his son. Ruby brings a book to the hospital for Belle (Emilie de Ravin) at the hospital. Belle tells Ruby that the man who saved her had a ball of fire in his hands and he healed her just by touching her. Ruby tells her it is just dreams from the medication. Belle becomes upset and a nurse sedates her, which Greg Mendell (Ethan Embry) observes. Later, he tells Belle that he also saw the man holding a ball of fire. In the past, the giant meets Charming's brother and Jack.
| 36 | 14 | "Manhattan" | Dean White | Edward Kitsis & Adam Horowitz | February 17, 2013 | 7.61 |
Emma learns that Neal is Rumplestiltskin's son; Cora, Regina, and Hook look for the dagger; and in the past Rumplestiltskin realizes his destiny.
| 37 | 15 | "The Queen Is Dead" | Gwyneth Horder-Payton | Daniel T. Thomsen & David H. Goodman | March 3, 2013 | 7.39 |
Mary Margaret learns that Cora and Regina are looking for the dagger; Hook stabs Mr. Gold with his hook; and in the past Snow White's mother dies.
| 38 | 16 | "The Miller's Daughter" | Ralph Hemecker | Jane Espenson | March 10, 2013 | 7.64 |
Emma, David, Neal, and Mary Margaret have to protect Mr. Gold from Cora; and in the past Cora meets Rumplestiltskin.
| 39 | 17 | "Welcome to Storybrooke" | Dave Barrett | Ian Goldberg & Andrew Chambliss | March 17, 2013 | 7.45 |
Regina decides to get revenge on Mary Margaret; and in the past Regina meets a little boy and his father. The episode ends revealing Greg Mendell, the outsider, was that boy.
| 40 | 18 | "Selfless, Brave and True" | Ralph Hemecker | Robert Hull & Kalinda Vazquez | March 24, 2013 | 7.38 |
Mary Margaret stumbles upon August who is now a living puppet; Neal invites his fiance to Storybrooke; and in the past August meets Tamara.
| 41 | 19 | "Lacey" | Milan Cheylov | Edward Kitsis & Adam Horowitz | April 21, 2013 | 7.37 |
Mr. Gold enlists the help of David to help him try to jog Belle's now cursed memories and get her to love him again. Meanwhile, in the Fairytale land that was, Rumplestiltskin forces Belle to accompany him on a hunt to kill a thief.
| 42 | 20 | "The Evil Queen" | Gwyneth Horder-Payton | Jane Espenson & Christine Boylan | April 28, 2013 | 7.16 |
With the help of Hook, Regina attempts to put a plan in motion that will help transport herself and Henry back to the Enchanted Forest, while Emma's suspicions about Tamara grows. Meanwhile, in the Enchanted Forest that was, the Evil Queen asks Rumplestiltskin to transform her into an unrecognizable peasant in order to kill an unsuspecting Snow White.
| 43 | 21 | "Second Star to the Right" | Ralph Hemecker | Andrew Chambliss & Ian Goldberg | May 5, 2013 | 7.50 |
Emma, Mary Margaret, and David go in search of Regina when they discover that she, along with some magic beans, has gone missing. But against Neal's protests, Emma still believes that Tamara had something to do with Regina's disappearance. Meanwhile, in the past, young Baelfire finds himself back in 19th century London and is taken in by the Darling family, befriending their daughter Wendy.
| 44 | 22 | "And Straight On 'til Morning" | Dean White | Edward Kitsis & Adam Horowitz | May 12, 2013 | 7.33 |
Greg and Tamara plan to destroy Storybrooke, so Emma, Regina, Mary Margaret, David, Henry, and Hook have to stop them. Meanwhile, in the past, Hook meets Baelfire.

== Production ==
=== Development ===
On May 10, 2012, ABC ordered Once Upon a Time for a second season, which premiered on September 30, 2012.

Co-creators Adam Horowitz and Edward Kitsis spoke about the repercussions of the first season finale's events, stating, "Magic as we know always comes with a price and we are introducing it to a world where it has never been before and I think that's going to have unpredictable results. It's going to affect everybody this season because that's what's more fun." said Kitsis. On everyone in Storybrooke's memories returning Horowitz commented, "One of the things that's interesting to us to explore is this notion that just because the memories have returned does not mean that the past 28 years did not happen. Those memories, the Davids, the Mary Margarets, the Mr. Golds, all those people, who they were existed and what they did actually happened and those are the things that will have to be dealt with."

The show still bounced back-and-forth between the fairy-tale world and Storybrooke, although there were slight differences compared to season one. It was hinted that another form of narrative was introduced during the season.

=== Casting ===
In June 2012, it was reported that season one recurring actresses Meghan Ory (Red Riding Hood / Ruby) and Emilie de Ravin (Belle / Lacey) had both been promoted to series regulars for the second season. In July 2012, it was announced that Pretty Little Liars star Julian Morris would guest star as Prince Phillip, while Teen Wolf actor Sinqua Walls was cast as Sir Lancelot, a former member of the Round Table. In the same month, it was announced that The Tudors star Sarah Bolger and The Hangover Part II actress Jamie Chung had joined the recurring cast as Princess Aurora and Mulan. On August 3, 2012, The Rite actor Colin O'Donoghue booked the recurring role of Captain Killian "Hook" Jones, the prime antagonist of J. M. Barrie's Peter Pan. O'Donoghue joined the main cast during the second half of the season. The same day, it was reported that True Blood's Michael Raymond-James had joined the season's recurring cast in an unknown role, described only as "mysterious". This was later revealed to be Neal Cassidy (Rumplestiltskin's son Baelfire, Emma Swan's ex-boyfriend and Henry Mills' father). Lost alum Jorge Garcia recurs as Anton the Giant, referenced from Jack and the Beanstalk. Garcia was originally set to appear in only one episode, but his character's role was later expanded. Actor Raphael Sbarge, who portrays Jiminy Cricket, was made part of the recurring cast this season, as opposed to being included in the first season's main cast. The L Word actress Rachel Shelley played the recurring role of Milah, Rumplestiltskin's wife. Eureka actor Christopher Gauthier recurred throughout the season as William Smee, Captain Hook's right-hand-man. In October 2012, Can't Hardly Wait star Ethan Embry joined the recurring cast as an unknown visitor to Storybrooke. Eion Bailey, who plays Pinocchio / August Booth, made guest appearances in episodes six and 18. Tony Perez (Prince Henry) and Alan Dale (King George / Albert Spencer) both made recurring appearances in some capacity throughout the season.

Actor Noah Bean reprised his role as Daniel, the Evil Queen's love-interest, during "The Doctor". The X-Files actress Annabeth Gish guest starred as Anita, the leader of a pack of werewolves, in "Child of the Moon". The Christmas Card actor Chad Michael Collins and 24 veteran Gregory Itzin appeared in "In the Name of the Brother" as Dr. Frankenstein's younger brother Gerhardt and Alphonse, the boys' father, respectively. Scream and Charmed actress Rose McGowan portrayed a young Cora in "The Miller's Daughter". Lesley Nicol, of Downton Abbey fame, was cast as Johanna in "The Queen Is Dead" which also featured Heroes vet Rena Sofer as Queen Eva, Snow White's mother. It was implicated that the role has the potential to become recurring. Caprica actor John Pyper-Ferguson guest starred in "Welcome to Storybrooke" as Kurt Flynn, a widower who longs to aid his son after experiencing the loss of his mother. Season one co-star Jamie Dornan also reprised his role as Sheriff Graham Humbert in the episode.

Kings actor Sebastian Stan had portrayed Jefferson / Mad Hatter in a recurring role since the first season and returned for three episodes of season two; he had since departed from the show with obligations to the Broadway play Picnic and his role as Bucky Barnes / Winter Soldier in the Marvel Cinematic Universe. It was reported that ABC was set to recast the role with the potential for a possible spin-off based on the character. However, Stan's recasting was repudiated by series co-creator Adam Horowitz, saying that Stan "is a very busy man, I don't know when he will be making his way back toward us". He later confirmed that Stan would not be returning to the series in 2013.

=== Filming ===
Principal photography for the season began in Vancouver, British Columbia on July 16, 2012 and completed on April 5, 2013. The town of Steveston doubles as Storybrooke for the series.

== Ratings ==
Viewership and ratings per episode of Once Upon a Time season 2
| No. | Title | Air date | Rating/share (18–49) | Viewers (millions) | DVR (18–49) | DVR viewers (millions) | Total (18–49) | Total viewers (millions) |
|---|---|---|---|---|---|---|---|---|
| 1 | "Broken" | September 30, 2012 | 3.9/10 | 11.36 | 1.4 | 3.11 | 5.3 | 14.46 |
| 2 | "We Are Both" | October 7, 2012 | 3.4/9 | 9.84 | 1.3 | 2.91 | 4.7 | 12.75 |
| 3 | "Lady of the Lake" | October 14, 2012 | 3.0/8 | 9.45 | 1.4 | 2.96 | 4.4 | 12.41 |
| 4 | "The Crocodile" | October 21, 2012 | 3.3/8 | 9.89 | 1.5 | 3.12 | 4.8 | 13.01 |
| 5 | "The Doctor" | October 28, 2012 | 3.4/8 | 9.85 | 1.5 | 3.11 | 4.9 | 12.96 |
| 6 | "Tallahassee" | November 4, 2012 | 3.5/8 | 10.15 | 1.4 | 3.09 | 4.9 | 13.24 |
| 7 | "Child of the Moon" | November 11, 2012 | 2.7/7 | 8.75 | 1.5 | 3.22 | 4.2 | 11.97 |
| 8 | "Into the Deep" | November 25, 2012 | 3.1/7 | 8.82 | 1.3 | 3.11 | 4.4 | 11.93 |
| 9 | "Queen of Hearts" | December 2, 2012 | 3.1/8 | 9.10 | 1.2 | 2.56 | 4.3 | 11.66 |
| 10 | "The Cricket Game" | January 6, 2013 | 3.1/8 | 9.10 | 1.1 | 2.46 | 4.2 | 11.55 |
| 11 | "The Outsider" | January 13, 2013 | 2.8/7 | 8.24 | 1.3 | 2.82 | 4.1 | 11.07 |
| 12 | "In the Name of the Brother" | January 20, 2013 | 2.4/6 | 7.68 | 1.3 | 3.03 | 3.7 | 10.72 |
| 13 | "Tiny" | February 10, 2013 | 2.2/5 | 7.08 | 1.1 | 2.69 | 3.3 | 9.74 |
| 14 | "Manhattan" | February 17, 2013 | 2.4/6 | 7.61 | 1.1 | 2.54 | 3.5 | 10.15 |
| 15 | "The Queen is Dead" | March 3, 2013 | 2.2/6 | 7.39 | 1.2 | 2.68 | 3.4 | 10.07 |
| 16 | "The Miller's Daughter" | March 10, 2013 | 2.3/6 | 7.64 | 1.1 | 2.56 | 3.4 | 10.20 |
| 17 | "Welcome to Storybrooke" | March 17, 2013 | 2.3/6 | 7.45 | 1.0 | 2.36 | 3.3 | 9.81 |
| 18 | "Selfless, Brave and True" | March 24, 2013 | 2.2/6 | 7.38 | 1.0 | 2.41 | 3.2 | 9.79 |
| 19 | "Lacey" | April 21, 2013 | 2.1/6 | 7.37 | 0.9 | 1.98 | 3.0 | 9.35 |
| 20 | "The Evil Queen" | April 28, 2013 | 2.0/6 | 7.16 | 0.9 | 1.94 | 2.9 | 9.11 |
| 21 | "Second Star to the Right" | May 5, 2013 | 2.2/6 | 7.50 | 0.9 | 2.23 | 3.1 | 9.83 |
| 22 | "And Straight On 'Til Morning" | May 12, 2013 | 2.3/7 | 7.33 | 0.9 | —N/a | 3.2 | —N/a |

== Soundtrack ==
Once Upon a Time – Season 2: Original Television Soundtrack

Soundtrack album by Mark Isham
- Released: August 13, 2013
- Length: 63:53
- Label: Intrada
- Producer: Mark Isham

All tracks are written by Mark Isham.

| No. | Title | Length |
|---|---|---|
| 1. | "Sleeping Beauty" | 2:29 |
| 2. | "True Love" | 4:45 |
| 3. | "Magic" | 3:12 |
| 4. | "We Are Both" | 1:41 |
| 5. | "Meet the Jefferson" | 2:37 |
| 6. | "Ruby and Granny" | 1:54 |
| 7. | "A Real Boy" | 2:26 |
| 8. | "The Hedge Maze" | 4:13 |
| 9. | "Regina's True Love" | 2:29 |
| 10. | "Storybrooke Reunions" | 2:12 |
| 11. | "The Duelists" | 1:21 |
| 12. | "The Lady Jack" | 0:45 |
| 13. | "In a Burning Room" | 4:16 |
| 14. | "Tallahassee" | 2:21 |
| 15. | "This Boy Will Be Your Undoing" | 2:46 |
| 16. | "Science!" | 1:23 |
| 17. | "To Neverland!" | 1:58 |
| 18. | "Cora's Waltz" | 2:19 |
| 19. | "Snow White in Black" | 2:45 |
| 20. | "How Magic Is Made" | 3:33 |
| 21. | "One Perfect Day After Another" | 2:37 |
| 22. | "Bae and the Shadow" | 2:45 |
| 23. | "Tamara Shows Her True Colors" | 2:45 |
| 24. | "The Adventure Begins" | 2:14 |
| 25. | "Main Title" | 0:14 |

== Home video releases ==
Once Upon a Time – The Complete Second Season
| Set details | Special features | |
| Discs: 5 / 6 (R2/4); Episodes: 22 | A Fractured Family Tree, Narrated by Sarah Hyland of ABC's Modern Family (Blu-ray only); Good Morning Storybrooke; Sincerely, Hook; Girl Power; Bloopers; Audio Commentaries; Deleted Scenes | |
DVD release dates
| Region 1 | Region 2 | Region 4 |
| August 13, 2013 | November 18, 2013 | October 16, 2013 |
Blu-ray release dates
| Region A | | Region B |
| August 13, 2013 | | October 16, 2013 (AU) / November 18, 2013 (UK) |
