= Tallahassee (Once Upon a Time) =

- Once Upon a Time episode
- Episode no.: Season 2 Episode 6
- Directed by: David M. Barrett
- Written by: Christine Boylan; Jane Espenson
- Original air date: November 4, 2012

Guest appearances
- Eion Bailey as August W. Booth/Pinocchio; Sarah Bolger as Princess Aurora; Jamie Chung as Mulan; Jorge Garcia as The Giant; Colin O'Donoghue as Captain Killian "Hook" Jones; Michael Raymond-James as Neal Cassidy

Episode chronology
← Previous "The Doctor"	Next → "Child of the Moon"
- Once Upon a Time season 2

"Tallahassee" is the sixth episode of the second season of the American ABC fantasy/drama television series Once Upon a Time, and the show's 28th episode overall, which aired on November 4, 2012. It was co-written by Christine Boylan and Jane Espenson, while being directed by David M. Barrett.

In this episode, Emma Swan and Captain Hook climb a beanstalk to find a compass, while flashbacks show how she met Henry's father, Neal.

Despite moderate reviews from critics, the episode saw an increase in ratings, with 10.15 million viewers watching.

== Title card ==
A giant beanstalk grows in the Enchanted Forest.

== Plot ==
=== In the Enchanted Forest ===
Snow White/Mary Margaret (Ginnifer Goodwin), Emma Swan (Jennifer Morrison), Mulan (Jamie Chung), Aurora (Sarah Bolger), and Captain Hook (Colin O'Donoghue) arrive at the base of the beanstalk. Hook explains that the magic beans were cultivated by a race of giants who used them to plunder other lands until they were defeated by men led by Jack. The giants destroyed the beans in their defeat, and the magic compass is now part of the hoard of the last remaining giant. Hook explains that the beanstalk is enchanted to prevent it from being climbed. However, Cora gave Hook a counter spell that he can share with only one other person, and Emma insists on being the one to go with him. Mulan gives them a sleeping powder made from poppies, and Emma secretly instructs Mulan to chop down the beanstalk if they don't return after 10 hours.

Emma and Hook reach the top of the beanstalk where they are able to knock out the giant (Jorge Garcia) with the magical powder and begin their search in his treasure chamber. They encounter Jack's skeleton and evade a trip wire which would result trapping them in a giant cage. Before they can find the compass, the giant awakens and pursues them. Captain Hook is buried under rubble from the roof that fell due to the pounding of the giant's feet, but Emma manages to trap the giant in the cage. The giant gives Emma the compass and expects her to kill him while he is powerless as that has been his experience with humans. When she leaves him unharmed, he reveals that he has the strength to free himself, but he lets Emma go with the compass in thanks for sparing his life. Emma also convinces him to hold Hook prisoner for 10 hours, whom she handcuffed to a pole in case he planned to betray her.

On the ground, Snow comforts Aurora, who is plagued by nightmares whenever she sleeps; this is a common side effect of the sleeping curse that both she and Snow survived. Aurora describes her dream in which she was trapped in a sealed red room with red curtains. The curtains were on fire, and she realized another person was in the opposite corner of the room from her; he was looking at her through the flames. After 10 hours have passed, Mulan begins to cut down the beanstalk, but Snow fights her even after being told this was Emma's request. Emma returns, and Snow reiterates that they are going to go back to Storybrooke together. The group prepares to get the magical ashes from Cora.

=== In the Characters' Past ===
Eleven years ago (around 2001) in Portland, Oregon, a teenage Emma steals a yellow Volkswagen Bug which turns out to have already been stolen by a man who was hiding in the back seat. The man introduces himself as Neal Cassidy (Michael Raymond-James) and is revealed to be the man from the opening scene of "Broken." They become a couple, living off petty crimes as they travel from place to place. They eventually decide that they would like to settle down together, and Emma chooses Tallahassee by closing her eyes and pointing at a random location on a map. However, Neal learns he is still wanted for stealing a case of watches in Phoenix and his best bet is to flee to Canada. However, it would be too expensive for them to go together. Emma suggests that she retrieve the watches from where Neal stashed them so they can use the money from selling the watches to go to Canada together, and he agrees. Once she obtains the watches, she agrees to meet Neal after he sells them.

As soon as they part ways, Neal is accosted by Pinocchio (Eion Bailey), already using the pseudonym August W. Booth. August convinces Neal of the existence of magic by showing him the contents of a box (which remain unseen by the viewers), and then explains the curse and Emma's destiny. For her own good, August asks Neal to leave Emma. Later, at the meeting place, Emma is arrested by an officer who tells her that the tip was called in by Neal. Shocked and heartbroken, she complies without resistance. Two months later, August and Neal meet in Vancouver and August reveals that Emma was sentenced to 11 months in a minimum-security prison. Neal asks Booth to give Emma the yellow car and the proceeds of the sale of the watches. August agrees to send Neal a postcard if the curse is broken. In prison, Emma receives a package from Phuket, containing the car keys, but not the money. It is revealed that Emma is pregnant with Neal's child.

=== In Storybrooke ===
Henry (Jared S. Gilmore) awakens from a nightmare and is comforted by Prince Charming/David (Josh Dallas). He describes a dream that is identical to Aurora's, in which he could see a woman looking at him from the other side of the burning curtains.

== Production ==
"Tallahassee" was co-written by producer Christine Boylan and consulting producer Jane Espenson, while Cold Case veteran David M. Barrett served as episode director.

Although Jorge Garcia had been tapped to play the Giant for only one episode, the producers decided to bring Garcia back in a recurring status after he wrapped up production on this episode: "Yeah, we’ve talked about it for a while, whenever I’d run into them. We’ve been talking about them wanting to find a way to get me on. At different times we’ve talked ... but suddenly, this came up and they pitched the Giant to me and it sounded like an inspired fit, so we went for it."

== Cultural references ==
The scenes involving Jack and the Beanstalk borrow some of the elements and characteristics from Mickey and the Beanstalk. Appropriately, Jack is referred to as "Jack the Giant-Killer," a reference to the many stories of a boy named Jack killing various giants throughout Britain.

Mulan gives Emma a bag of magic knock-out powder made from poppies. This may be a reference to the sleeping spell used by the Wicked Witch in the Wizard of Oz when the protagonists are crossing through a poppy field.

Neal Cassady was the real-life model for the character Dean Moriarty in Jack Kerouac's novel On The Road.

The scene when August talks Neal into leaving Emma so she can be happy is parallel to the season one episode "Dreamy," when the Blue Fairy talks Dreamy (who later becomes Grumpy/Leroy) into leaving Nova so she can be happy. Both the Blue Fairy and Pinocchio are also the primary characters in Pinocchio.

This episode features, in great emphasis, at least 6 references/locations to the TV series Lost:

- The keychain stolen by Neal and given to Emma has a swan design very similar to central part the Dharma Initiative logo for The Swan station, more commonly referred to as "The Hatch".
- Not in Portland is the 7th episode of the 3rd season - the character goes from Portland to another location.
- Stranger in a Strange Land is the 9th episode of the 3rd season - a character stays for a period of time in Phuket.
- The Man from Tallahassee is the 13th episode of the 3rd season - a character flees from another.
- Jorge Garcia plays a kind character, who ends up being "in charge" of his "realm" (which appears to be isolated from the rest of the "world").
- Jennifer Morrison's character, Emma Swan is shown collaborating in a theft of Apollo Candy Bars, referencing the chocolate candy that was found in the pantry of the DHARMA Initiative station, the Swan, in the episode Adrift (Lost).

The flashback scenes took place in Portland. Incidentally, this is the setting of NBC's Grimm, another supernatural crime TV series based on fairy tales.

== Reception ==
=== Ratings ===
This outing would see another increase in the ratings, scoring a 3.5/8 among 18-49s with 10.15 million viewers tuning in, giving the series its best numbers since the second season premiere.

=== Reviews ===
The episode received mixed reviews from critics.

Entertainment Weekly's Hilary Busis liked the episode, but had reservations over the inclusion of more characters and guest stars: "As much as it warms the cockles of my heart to see Jorge Garcia in something better than Alcatraz, I'd love if Once could cool it with the new characters for a few weeks. Sure, it's cool to see the show's universe grow richer -- but increased breadth can easily hamper increased depth, and at this point, I'd rather learn more about folks who have already been introduced (Cora, especially) than see even more fairy tales/nineteenth century novels/ancient Chinese legends/whatever get thrown into the mix. Well, unless the subjects of those additions are played by more Lost alumni. What will it take to get Josh Holloway on as Peter Pumpkineater, or something?"

The Huffington Post's Laura Prudom gave it a good review: "After the last episode's hit-and-miss introduction to Frankenstein, this week's 'Once Upon a Time' felt like a breath of fresh, top-of-the-beanstalk air." Prudom also thought that this was the strongest episode of the second season so far.

The A.V. Club gave this episode a D: "'Tallahassee' is the first big misstep of this show’s second season, with a flashback that tries too hard to be 'Lost' and fantasy sequences that are crippled by this show’s limited special effects. Once Upon A Time is not Lost. The latter succeeded because it was able to flesh out its characters and make them real people trapped in fantastic circumstances, but OUAT is the exact opposite, transplanting characters from fantasy to reality. The fairybacks serve the same purpose as Lost’s flashbacks/forwards/sideways, attempting to flesh out the human side of these characters, but the fairy tale environment actively works against that goal. Especially when this show loses sight of the limitations that a network television budget puts on storytelling. I don’t know if there have been any episodes that have been as negatively affected by this show’s lacking visuals as 'Tallahassee,' which features some incredibly sloppy green screen work."

IGN's Amy Ratcliffe gave the episode a 7.0, stating that "this week's Once Upon a Time told a touching story and featured a terribly rendered giant," in reference to Emma's backstory and the episode's special effects.
