= Into the Deep (Once Upon a Time) =

- Once Upon a Time episode
- Episode no.: Season 2 Episode 8
- Directed by: Ron Underwood
- Written by: Kalinda Vazquez; Daniel T. Thomsen
- Original air date: November 25, 2012

Guest appearances
- Sarah Bolger as Princess Aurora; Jamie Chung as Mulan; Beverley Elliott as Granny; Barbara Hershey as Cora; Colin O'Donoghue as Captain Killian "Hook" Jones

Episode chronology
← Previous "Child of the Moon"	Next → "Queen of Hearts"
- Once Upon a Time season 2

"Into the Deep" is the eighth episode of the second season of the American ABC fantasy/drama television series Once Upon a Time, and the show's 30th episode overall, which aired on November 25, 2012.

In this episode, Aurora is kidnapped by Cora; Mary Margaret goes to sleep; and David is put under a sleeping curse.

It was co-written by Kalinda Vazquez and Daniel T. Thomsen, while being directed by Ron Underwood.

== Title card ==
Reanimated corpses walk through the Enchanted Forest.

== Plot ==
=== In Storybrooke ===
In his sleep, Henry (Jared S. Gilmore) learns from Aurora (Sarah Bolger) that Snow White/Mary Margaret (Ginnifer Goodwin) and Emma Swan (Jennifer Morrison) are alive in the Enchanted Forest. When he wakes up, he reveals this to David (Josh Dallas) and Regina (Lana Parrilla), and tells them that his mother and grandmother are now threatened by Cora (Barbara Hershey).

Regina finds Mr. Gold (Robert Carlyle) while he is eating with Belle (Emilie de Ravin), and they discuss Cora; they thought her to be dead, and Regina believed she had seen her mother's body. Regina points out that Gold's feelings for Belle are now a weakness Cora can exploit, and he agrees to help prevent Cora from coming to Storybrooke. Henry is committed to meeting with Aurora again, because he wants to be a hero. Gold explains that when he was imprisoned via a magical quill, it was actually the ink—harvested from a deep-sea squid—that trapped him; he had a supply of this ink, and the others can find it in his jail cell to use against Cora.

Unfortunately, Aurora is pulled from the netherworld before Henry can tell her this information, and Henry's arm is badly burned. Gold uses his magic to heal Henry, but David and Regina agree it is too dangerous to allow Henry to put himself at risk again. David is confident that Mary Margaret will find a way to take Aurora's place in the netherworld, so Regina prepares another sleeping curse and David administers it to himself via a poisoned spindle. Henry gives David the amulet, and also tells Regina he is glad she is using magic sparingly and only for good. Because he is being affected by the curse for the first time, David initially finds himself in a mirrored, torch-lit hall. The amulet helps him find a spot where the floor is hot, and he is able to destroy the floor and fall down into the fiery room. He gives Mary Margaret the information about the ink, and asks her to kiss him in order to free him from the curse; however, they discover that they cannot make any kind of physical contact in the netherworld. David tells Mary Margaret to return to Storybrooke and kiss him there, and they reiterate their love for one another before Mary Margaret wakes up, leaving David alone in the fiery room.

In Mr. Gold's store, where David's body is resting, Regina tries to reassure Henry that David will awaken soon, but it's clear she and Mr. Gold realize something has gone wrong.

=== In the Enchanted Forest ===
Captain Hook (Colin O'Donoghue) finishes climbing down the beanstalk, where Cora intercepts him to demand the compass. Upon learning he lost it to Emma, she declares their partnership ended and tells him she will leave him in the Enchanted Forest, his revenge against Rumpelstiltskin not accomplished. Cora returns to the settlement she destroyed, and uses the hearts of the refugees to reanimate the corpses as servants to do her bidding.

Emma shows Aurora a photograph of Henry to confirm that he is the boy she met. Mary Margaret reveals that she, too, has visited the fiery, red room in her sleep, but withheld that information from Aurora to avoid frightening her even more. Mary Margaret realizes that the sleeping curse is the connection, and develops a plan to communicate with Mr. Gold, whom she believes is the only person with the knowledge of how to overpower Cora. Aurora goes back to sleep and explains the whole situation to Henry.

The next day, as they travel, Mulan (Jamie Chung) sees that Aurora's arm has been burned. Having promised Prince Phillip that she would protect Aurora, Mulan is reluctant to let Aurora endanger herself for Mary Margaret and Emma's goals; but Aurora insists that every day since she was rescued has been a gift, and that it is right for her to use that gift to help someone else. They make camp so Aurora can sleep in order to meet with Henry again, but the camp is attacked by Cora's corpse army and Aurora is pulled from the netherworld when Mulan must awaken her. Mary Margaret, Emma, and Mulan prevent Cora's servants from taking the compass, but Aurora is abducted.

Cora holds Aurora prisoner, revealing that she knew about Aurora's secret ambition to go to Storybrooke with Emma and Snow, but Aurora is defiant even after Cora offers to help recover Philip's soul, explaining that the souls of wraith victims are transported to another realm. Cora is so angered, she knocks Aurora unconscious. She then sends a raven to inform Mary Margaret that Cora will kill Aurora if they fail to bring her the compass by sundown. Mulan wants to make the trade, but Mary Margaret suggests they re-establish contact with Henry in order to overpower Cora; if Mary Margaret were exposed to Mulan's sleeping powder, it should weaken her mental defenses enough to cause her to visit the netherworld. However, Mulan is out of powder, so they travel to the Woods of the Dead to find a poppy, from which Mulan produces more powder. Emma expresses her regret that she failed to prevent Henry from falling under the sleeping curse, but Mary Margaret points out that she could have prevented Regina's curse in the first place and there is nothing to gain from finding ways to blame themselves; Emma affirms that she blames Regina. Mulan uses the sleeping powder on Mary Margaret who meets with David in the netherworld. She awakens and explains David's plight, but Emma confidently reassures her that they will get back to Storybrooke and that Mary Margaret will free David from this new curse; she has faith in them. Mary Margaret tells Emma that they need to travel to Rumpelstiltskin's cell, but then they realize that Mulan has left with the compass to make Cora's trade.

Meanwhile, Hook releases Aurora and asks her to tell Emma that his offer still stands; he will help them get the magical ashes in exchange for passage with them. Aurora finds the others just after Snow and Emma have overtaken Mulan, and it seems that Snow is prepared to kill Mulan to prevent her from going to Cora. Aurora breaks up the fight and explains that Hook released her in order to prove he can be trusted and—she suspects—because he has feelings for Emma. It is revealed that Hook removed Aurora's heart before setting her free; he uses this to reestablish his alliance with Cora, who is now using the heart to control Aurora.

== Production ==
"Into the Deep" was co-written by co-producer Daniel T. Thomsen and producer Kalinda Vazquez, while Mighty Joe Young veteran Ron Underwood served as episode director.

== Cultural references ==
The episode makes references to "Sleeping Beauty" and "Snow White." A spindle prick is described as the "old-fashioned way" of delivering the sleeping curse directly into the victim's bloodstream, with poisoning by apple described as a later innovation.

== Reception ==
=== Ratings ===
The episode helped the series post a 2.7% increase from the previous outing, scoring a 3.0/7 among 18-49s with 8.8 million viewers tuning in

=== Reviews ===
The episode received mixed reviews from critics.

In a review from '"Blogcritics.org," "'Into the Deep' has lots of interesting goings on, and although the plot is simple enough, its rich texture moves the story ahead while giving us little glimpses into some of the series most pivotal relationships both in the present day and ancient Fairytale Land timelines."

In a review from "Entertainment Weekly," Hilary Busis summed it this way: "Into the Deep" was sort of a throwaway episode, important only insofar as it sets up the events for next week's explosive-looking winter finale. I might have a different opinion if the hour hadn't included so many filler-y heart-to-hearts (Mulan and Aurora; Regina and Henry; Emma and Snow), or had toned down some of its most unintentionally funny lines.

The A.V. Club gave this episode a C−: "In this week’s episode of 'Once Upon A Time,' people fall asleep a lot, which is a perfect representation of the experience of watching this week’s episode of 'Once Upon A Time.' 'Into The Deep' (or as I have retitled it: 'Slow Story In A Burning Room') is a string of convenient plot twists stemming from the Sleeping Curse that Snow White, Aurora, and Henry have all fallen under in the past, and it uses the curse to progress the plot in a passive fashion. Last episode’s cliffhanger revealed that Aurora can talk to Henry inside the netherworld of their dreams, and this week, that burning room becomes a magical telephone that allows the two worlds to communicate with each other. If you thought Henry couldn’t get more annoying, just wait until you hear Jared S. Gilmore yell all of his lines."

Amy Ratcliffe, of "IGN," called the episode "amazing," giving it a 9.0 out of 10. She commented that O'Donoghue excels at playing nefarious, and that having Snow White kick butt always makes for an improved episode. She summed up the installment by saying, "This week's fantastic Once Upon a Time had it all with great action and solid character moments!"
