= Child of the Moon =

- Once Upon a Time episode
- Episode no.: Season 2 Episode 7
- Directed by: Anthony Hemingway
- Written by: Ian Goldberg; Andrew Chambliss
- Original air date: November 11, 2012

Guest appearances
- Lee Arenberg as Grumpy/Leroy; Sarah Bolger as Princess Aurora; Alan Dale as King George/Albert Spencer; Beverley Elliott as Granny; Annabeth Gish as Anita; Ben Hollingsworth as Quinn; Keegan Connor Tracy as The Blue Fairy/Mother Superior

Episode chronology
← Previous "Tallahassee"	Next → "Into the Deep"
- Once Upon a Time season 2

"Child of the Moon" is the seventh episode of the second season of the American ABC fantasy/drama television series Once Upon a Time, and the show's 29th episode overall, which aired on November 11, 2012.

In this episode, Ruby is the prime suspect of a murder; and Regina helps Henry when he starts having nightmares.

It was co-written by Andrew Chambliss & Ian Goldberg, while being directed by Anthony Hemingway.

== Title card ==
Red Riding Hood walks through the Enchanted Forest.

== Plot ==
=== Event Chronology ===
The Enchanted Forest events take place immediately after "Red-Handed" and before "The Evil Queen". The Storybrooke events take place after "Tallahassee".

=== In the Characters' Past ===
In the Enchanted Forest, Snow White (Ginnifer Goodwin) and Red Riding Hood (Meghan Ory) fight off the Evil Queen's men and escape from them. But Red's hood has torn, and she worries it won't prevent her from turning into a wolf during that night's coming full moon. She insists that they separate for the night, for Snow's safety, and they plan to reunite in the morning. Snow reaffirms her commitment to their friendship. As she leaves, Red is watched by a man with glowing eyes. The following morning, he appears and steals the hood. After a physical altercation, he introduces himself as Quinn (Ben Hollingsworth), a fellow werewolf. He tells her that she can learn how to control the wolf, and leads her to a subterranean community of werewolves. Their leader Anita (Annabeth Gish) is revealed to be Red's mother. Anita tells Red that Granny (Beverley Elliott) kidnapped Red as baby and lied about her parents, to prevent her from learning her true identity. Anita says she can teach her to learn control by accepting the wolf as a part of herself, and she persuades Red to remove her hood.

During the night, Anita teaches Red that her blackouts are caused by her belief that the wolf is an invader; by instead recognizing the wolf as herself, she can retain control. In the morning, Red remembers the entire experience and is no longer afraid. Snow later arrives, having tracked Red. Red persuades Anita that Snow is not a threat, and informs Snow that she's going to stay with her "pack" and her mother, a decision Snow regretfully accepts. However, the queen's men then arrive and kill Quinn before being killed by the werewolves. Anita holds Snow responsible and tells Red to kill her. When Red refuses, Anita turns into a wolf in order to do it herself. Red also transforms and inadvertently kills Anita by knocking her onto a skewer. Snow places the red cloak onto Red, changing her back into her human form. Red apologizes to her mother, who says Red chose Snow, but Red explains that she chose herself and is not a killer. Red and Snow bury Anita, and Red tells Snow that she didn't lose her family; she protected it, because Snow was the only person who truly accepted both aspects of her dual nature.

=== In Storybrooke ===
The dwarves continue mining for fairy dust in the mines. After Leroy (Lee Arenberg) resists taking a break, he punctures a wall and discovers the diamonds needed to create fairy dust. The Mother Superior (Keegan Connor Tracy) tells David (Josh Dallas) to protect Jefferson's damaged hat and that they will be ready to bring back Mary Margaret and Emma Swan (Jennifer Morrison) within a day.

At Granny's, Billy the tow truck driver introduces himself to Ruby as Gus, a mouse who lived in Cinderella's pantry, and asks her out for a drink. She declines, and Belle provides the false excuse of a prearranged "girls' night; Red keeps secret the fact that she'll turn into a wolf that night. Henry (Jared S. Gilmore) drinks coffee to avoid sleep, due to his curse-induced nightmares, but David reassures him. Albert Spencer (Alan Dale) arrives and tells David that he is determined to discredit him. David assures Spencer that, having defeated him before, he can defeat him again. Granny finishes welding a cage for Ruby since, after 28 years without turning, Ruby is unsure if she can still control herself and she has been unable to find her red hood in Storybrooke. She locks herself in for the night, but in the morning Granny discovers claw marks on the destroyed cage; she and David find Ruby in the woods, and she has no memory of the previous night. They then check on an abandoned vehicle in town, which turns out to be Billy's tow truck. When Billy's corpse is found nearby in two pieces, Ruby believes that she might be responsible for his death and asks David to lock her up in jail, even though David believes that Ruby is innocent.

Meanwhile, David has asked Regina (Lana Parrilla) to stay with Henry. When he awakens from his fiery nightmare with a burn on his hand, she brings him to see Mr. Gold (Robert Carlyle). Gold explains that the nightmares are a side effect of the sleeping curse; its victims' souls travel to a netherworld (a "very real" world "between life and death") until the curse is broken, and recovered victims can find themselves there while sleeping. Gold can't keep Henry from going back there, but he prepares an amulet that will allow Henry to control his actions in the other world, providing it free of charge.

Spencer comes to the police station and accuses Ruby of the murder. After David refuses Spencer's demand that Ruby be turned over to the will of the townspeople, Spencer denounces David and Ruby to an angry mob that then breaks into the station, only to find that Ruby is gone. She is at the library, where Belle (Emilie de Ravin) has agreed to hide her. Over Ruby's warnings, Belle plans to stay through the night with a chained Ruby. But Ruby instead traps Belle and goes to face the mob, believing she deserves death. Granny's tracking skills lead David to uncover Ruby's hood and the real murder weapon, an axe, in the trunk of a car registered to Spencer. Spencer and the mob corner Ruby in her wolf form and Spencer points his gun at her, but Granny disarms Spencer with a crossbow. David identifies Spencer as the murderer and demands that the mob stand down. He calms Ruby and puts the hood over her, restoring her human form. After Spencer flees, David and Ruby pursue him but catch him only after he destroys Jefferson's hat in a fire; David points his gun at him, but lets him live. At the loft, Ruby reassures David that they'll find a way to bring his family home. She leaves the hood with him so she can run free as a wolf.

=== In the Enchanted Forest ===
Princess Aurora (Sarah Bolger) sleeps and again dreams of the fiery room. This time, Henry uses the tool Gold gave him to control the dream; he calms the flames and reassures her. Aurora wakes up and stuns Mary Margaret and Emma by telling them that she met a boy in her dream, and "his name was Henry".

== Production ==
"Child of the Moon" was co-written by producers Ian Goldberg and Andrew Chambliss, while Shameless veteran Anthony Hemingway served as episode director.

== Cultural references ==
This episode uses inspired references, elements and quotes from Cinderella and Shakira's 2009 single "She Wolf."

"Child of the Moon" was the b-side to The Rolling Stones song "Jumpin' Jack Flash" (1968).

== Reception ==
=== Ratings ===
This outing would be the lowest ever in the series' run, placing a 2.7/7 with only 8.75 million viewers tuning in, a 23% drop from the previous episode. However, they weren't alone as all of the other programs that aired on this night also posted record lows as well besides Once Upon a Time.

=== Reviews ===
The episode was met with mixed reviews from critics.

Entertainment Weekly's Hilary Busis loved this episode: "A moment of silence, please, in honor of cute werewolf Quinn, Gus-Gus -- can you believe that Storybrooke hottie Billy once looked like this? and Anita, Red Riding Hood's bloodthirsty, feather-loving mama wolf. (Age-inappropriate casting alert! Annabeth Gish, who played Anita, is only 11 years older than Meghan Ory, who portrays her onscreen daughter.) Between those three and all the knights who got their necks snapped in the Wolf Pack's secret furry lair, tonight's Once had a bigger body count than usual. No matter what she does, death seems to follow Red like the train of her signature cloak -- trauma, trauma on the wall, is her back story the most tragic of them all?

The A.V. Club gave this episode a C: "After the first few episodes of this season proved to be a nice change of pace, the show’s new status quo introduced a set of challenges that the writers haven’t fully met (see last week’s abysmal installment), and this week’s chapter is a Storybrooke-centric story that suffers from many of the problems of last season. It begins with a misleading opening sequence where the dwarves find magical diamonds under Storybrooke that can be ground into fairy dust and put in the Magic Hat to bring back Emma and Snow. But this episode is minimally concerned with bringing back the exiled women, instead focusing on Ruby to tell a half-assed mystery/horror plot."

In a positive review from TV Fanatic, Christine Orlando notes that "Child of the Moon" conjured up another fiendishly good hour of Once Upon a Time as the full moon came out and Red's wolfie ways showed their claws.

The Huffington Post's Laura Prudom was also pleased with the outing, even if it had some flawed moments that did not fit the storyline: "Generally, episodes of 'Once Upon a Time' fall into two categories: those that propel the mythology forward in big ways (such as last week's 'Tallahassee') and those that tread water by focusing more on character backstory, and/or form building blocks for the next mythology episode. This week's Ruby-centric outing, 'Child of the Moon,' fell into the latter category—not much was resolved or advanced, but it was clearly pushing things into place for next week's dramatic-looking installment. That's not a value judgment; every serialized story requires certain 'filler' episodes to pace the story advancement over 22 weeks, and 'Child of the Moon' did a fine job of making us root for Ruby/Red as we learned more about her troubled past."

Amy Ratcliffe of IGN gave it a 6.9, citing that "This week's Once Upon a Time put the focus back on Ruby, with mixed results," and thought that there was stiff dialogue throughout the episode.
