= Lady of the Lake (Once Upon a Time) =

- Once Upon a Time episode
- Snow White (Ginnifer Goodwin) and Prince Charming (Josh Dallas) wed, as his mother's dying wish
- Episode no.: Season 2 Episode 3
- Directed by: Milan Cheylov
- Written by: Andrew Chambliss; Ian Goldberg
- Original air date: October 14, 2012

Guest appearances
- Sarah Bolger as Princess Aurora; Jamie Chung as Mulan; Alan Dale as King George/Albert Spencer; Barbara Hershey as Cora; Sebastian Stan as The Mad Hatter/Jefferson; Gabrielle Rose as Ruth; Sinqua Walls as Sir Lancelot; Alissa Skovbye as Grace/Paige; Lee Tichon as Guard; Carolyn Adair as Nurse

Episode chronology
| ← Previous "We Are Both" | Next → "The Crocodile" |
- Once Upon a Time season 2

"Lady of the Lake" is the third episode of the second season of the American ABC fantasy/drama television series Once Upon a Time, and the show's 25th episode overall, which aired on October 14, 2012.

It was co-written by Andrew Chambliss and Ian Goldberg, while being directed by Milan Cheylov.

In this episode, Emma Swan and her mother try to find a way to get back home with the help of Mulan, Aurora, and Lancelot, while flashbacks show Snow's encounter with Lancelot.

The episode was received positively by critics, and was watched by 9.45 million American viewers.

== Title card ==
Sir Lancelot walks through the Enchanted Forest.

== Plot ==
=== In the Characters' Past ===
At a campsite, Prince Charming (Josh Dallas), Red Riding Hood (Meghan Ory), Snow White (Ginnifer Goodwin), and their allies are attacked by King George's (Alan Dale) knights. One of the assailants turns out to be Sir Lancelot (Sinqua Walls), who captures Snow and brings her back to face King George. At the palace, the King tells Snow that Charming failed him because he wanted him to be the son that he always longed to have and now wants Charming to feel his pain. The King had offered Snow water to drink upon her arrival, and after she has drunk it, he reveals to her it that was actually a potion to prevent her from ever having children. Moments later, and after being dropped out of a carriage, Snow hears someone on horseback, so she takes a stick and knocks him to the ground, revealing the person to be Lancelot. However, it turns out that Lancelot wants to help Snow reach Charming and his mother Ruth (Gabrielle Rose) before King George's men get to them. By the time they reach the farm, Snow and Lancelot discover that they are too late, as Charming has already fended off the King's men, but Ruth has been shot by a poisoned arrow. After she is hit, she gives Snow a medallion she got from a gypsy that will predict the gender of Snow's unborn baby, but it doesn't work because of the effects of the King's potion. Snow eventually reveals to Ruth what has happened, and Ruth then tells her the water of Lake Nostos is a chance to break the curse for both women.

As the group arrives at Lake Nostos, they discover that the lake is now dry. Charming realizes that killing the Siren to free Frederick resulted in the disappearance of the water. However, Lancelot believes that there has to be some water left in the area, and he finds enough in a snail shell for one person. Ruth secretly suggests to Snow that she take it instead of her, but Snow reluctantly turns down the offer. When Ruth drinks the water, however, she was not healed. Knowing it is too late to look for another way to save her, Ruth regrets not being able to see Snow and Charming's wedding. This gives Snow an idea to perform a small wedding ceremony just for Ruth. Snow asks Lancelot to perform the ceremony, and Snow and Charming are married before Ruth passes away. Charming then gives Snow the medallion, which all of a sudden starts moving over her hand. Snow realizes that Ruth only pretended to drink the water and had Lancelot put it in the chalice at their wedding in order to get Snow to drink it, thus breaking the curse of the potion. She tells Lancelot the medallion has predicted that their child will be a girl. Charming vows that they will take the kingdom, this time as a family.

=== In the Enchanted Forest ===
Inside the pit, Emma Swan (Jennifer Morrison) comes face to face with Cora (Barbara Hershey), who wants to talk to her. Cora explains to Emma who she is, and claims to be nothing like the Evil Queen/Regina (Lana Parrilla). Snow White/Mary Margaret wakes up and, recognizing Cora, warns Emma not to trust her. Emma, however, believes Cora might be telling the truth. Emma and Mary Margaret are later released from the pit and meet Sir Lancelot, who immediately recognizes Mary Margaret and apologizes for their harsh treatment. While Princess Aurora (Sarah Bolger) seethes at Lancelot's warm treatment, Mulan (Jamie Chung) puts her faith in him. Lancelot tells Mary Margaret about what happened when the curse was broken: ogres have returned and are currently roaming the woods, terrorizing any survivors outside the island. Mary Margaret begs Lancelot to let her search for a portal; he eventually consents on the condition they bring Mulan. Later that night, Mary Margaret is jumped by Aurora who holds a dagger to her throat. Mary Margaret easily disarms Aurora and holds her to the ground, telling her that Phillip's death was not her fault and to channel her anger some other way. As Mulan pulls Mary Margaret off of Aurora, Emma shoots a bullet into the air, catching the attention of a nearby ogre, who proceeds to give chase. Emma trips over the fallen branch and the ogre catches up to her, crushing her gun and blocking her escape. Just then, Mary Margaret yells at the ogre to back away from Emma and shoots an arrow into the ogre's eye, killing him instantly.

Later, at the former palace of Snow White and Prince Charming, the four ladies arrive, where they proceed to Emma's former nursery and find the wardrobe there. As Emma and Mary Margaret try to figure out a way to bring the wardrobe back to the safe haven, Lancelot shows up at the last minute. Although initially happy to see him, Mary Margaret draws out her sword and exposes Lancelot as Cora, who made the mistake of mentioning Henry by name (Emma had mentioned his name to Cora, but not Lancelot). Cora then transforms back into her original form and admits that she killed Lancelot a while back and was waiting for an opportunity to join her daughter and grandson. Cora then unleashes her power on both Mary Margaret and Emma, but as she gloats to Mary Margaret about her victory, Emma sets the tree on fire using the gunpowder from her bullets. Mulan, who was standing guard outside the room with Aurora, jumps in and deflects Cora's attacks. Cora warns that she is not done with them and disappears. Mulan asks Snow to be the leader of the refugees. Emma and Snow discuss the sacrifices that parents must make for their children's well-being. Emma states that she is not used to people putting her first, but her mother gives her a hug and tells her to get used to it. After the heroines depart, Cora reappears with a potion bottle and fills it with the ashes of the wardrobe. The potion bottle glows red- there was still a little magic left in the wardrobe.

=== In Storybrooke ===
As Prince Charming/David attempts to find a way to use the hat to bring back Snow White/Mary Margaret and Emma, Henry (Jared S. Gilmore) insists on helping, but Charming, who says that he'll find magic, wants Henry to concentrate on going to school while he takes care of this situation. Henry, as usual, does the opposite and goes to see the Mad Hatter/Jefferson (Sebastian Stan). When Henry sees the Mad Hatter at a park bench, he asks for help, but the Mad Hatter/Jefferson says he is not able to, but not before telling Henry about Regina's vault at the cemetery. Henry knows that the Mad Hatter's daughter, Paige/Grace, has been looking for him, but the Mad Hatter/Jefferson is afraid to face her because she will be upset about him abandoning her. Henry thinks that the Mad Hatter should go see her anyway. After that conversation, Henry calls Regina at her office (who was asked to vacate the premises and was packing up her things) to ask her to meet at Granny's Diner for lunch. She leaves, and Henry sneaks into her office to get her skeleton keys so he can sneak into her vault.

Henry later arrives at his adopted grandfather's tomb. He sees the boxes where Regina keeps her hearts, but pays little attention to them. After exploring around for a bit, he finally comes upon a box and unlocks it only to reveal a pair of Agrabah vipers. Luckily, Charming shows up and boxes the things, Regina having tipped him off about the missing keys and being stood up at the diner. Charming tells Henry that they will find a way to get Emma and Snow/Mary Margaret back, together. Later that day, the Mad Hatter is finally reunited with his daughter, Paige/Grace, and Henry watches this from a distance. He is soon joined by Charming, who buys a pair of wooden swords to teach Henry how to defend himself. As they are sword-playing, King George/Albert Spencer secretly watches them in his car from a distance.

== Production ==
"Lady of the Lake" was co-written by producers Andrew Chambliss & Ian Goldberg, while being directed by 24 veteran Milan Cheylov.

== Cultural references ==
The pit that Emma, Snow White/Mary Margaret, and Cora were placed in resembles the scene from Lost in which the survivors were also caught and sent down to a pit with another person willing to help, only to later find out the person was a traitor. In this case, the traitor was Cora.

Although the episode is named for the supernatural character from Arthurian legend, the actual Lady of the Lake does not appear in this episode. She is mentioned indirectly when Lancelot says he was raised by a lake.

== Reception ==
=== Ratings ===
For the second week, the ratings took another hit, slipping to a 3.0/8 among 18-49s with 9.45 million viewers tuning in, an 11% drop from the previous episode. The drop was attributed to having this episode go up against NBC's Sunday Night Football and Fox' NLCS championship game airing at the same time, even though the episode topped the Fox telecast during the first hour.

=== Reviews ===
The episode received mostly positive reviews.

Entertainment Weekly's Hillary Busis liked the episode, especially Sinqua Walls in the Lancelot role ("You can ride in my cart anytime, Lancelot!"), but thought that the Storybrooke setup in this outing was a little weak: "While nothing was really wrong with this portion of the episode, it didn't do much to propel Once's master plot forward."

The A.V. Club gave the episode a B, but had positive remarks, noting that "things are moving at a much brisker pace than last season, and this show is finally figuring out a good balance between fairy tale fantasy and grounded human emotion. The show does run the risk of becoming overstuffed with so many plots going on at once, though, and some of the more dramatic moments lose their impact because they aren’t fully built up."

Amy Ratcliffe of IGN gave the episode a 7.1 even though she thought that "this week's Once Upon a Time brought laughter and tears, but tried to cram too much into one episode."
