= Christine Boylan =

Television writer, television producer

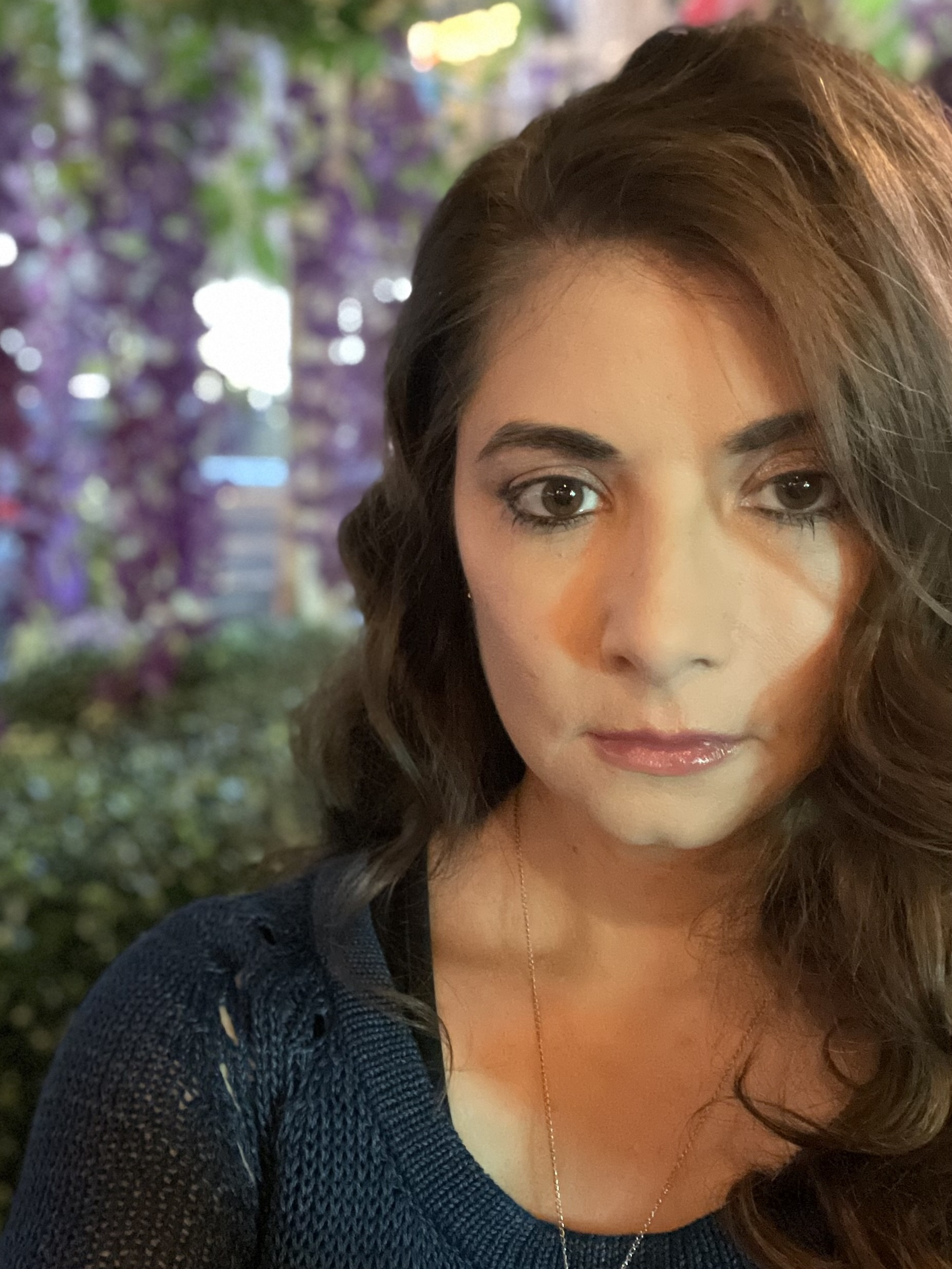
- Boylan in 2022
- Born: Christine Ann Boylan; July 25, 1977 (age 48)
- Occupations: Television writer, television producer
- Years active: 2007–present
- Spouse: Eric Heisserer (m. 2010)

Christine Ann Boylan (born July 25, 1977) is an American television writer and producer. She is known for her work on the ABC crime series Castle.

== Life and career ==
Christine attended Hofstra University. Since 2010, she has been married to screenwriter Eric Heisserer. Her first job was on the planned NBC apocalyptic miniseries Day One, as an executive writer and story editor. The project ultimately never aired.

She was a writer and story editor on the TNT drama Leverage, from 2008-2010. Her next position was at the ABC medical drama Off the Map, as a writer and executive story editor. She contributed two episodes during the show's only season. In summer 2011, Boylan joined the fourth season of the ABC crime series Castle, as a writer and co-producer. After the completion of the season she departed the show.

Boylan additionally served as a writer and producer on the second and third seasons of the ABC fantasy/mystery Once Upon a Time. Episodes she has contributed to include:

- "Tallahassee" 2.06 (co-written with consulting producer Jane Espenson)
- "Tiny" 2.13 (co-written by producer Kalinda Vazquez)
- "The Evil Queen" 2.20 (co-written with consulting producer Jane Espenson)
- "Good Form" 3.05 (co-written with producer Daniel T. Thomsen)
- "Save Henry" 3.09 (co-written with producer Daniel T. Thomsen)
