= A Land Without Magic =

- Once Upon a Time episode
- Episode no.: Season 1 Episode 22
- Directed by: Dean White
- Written by: Edward Kitsis; Adam Horowitz
- Original air date: May 13, 2012

Guest appearances
- David Anders as Dr. Whale; Emilie de Ravin as Belle/Patient; Jamie Dornan as The Huntsman; Meghan Ory as Ruby; Sebastian Stan as Jefferson; Kristin Bauer van Straten as Maleficent; Beverley Elliott as Granny; Keegan Connor Tracy as Mother Superior

Episode chronology
← Previous "An Apple Red as Blood"	Next → "Broken"
- Once Upon a Time season 1

"A Land Without Magic" is the 22nd episode and first season finale of the American fairy tale/drama television series Once Upon a Time, which aired in the United States on ABC on May 13, 2012.

The series takes place in the fictional seaside town of Storybrooke, Maine, in which the residents are actually characters from various fairy tales that were transported to the "real world" town by a powerful curse. In this episode, Emma tries to discover her destiny; and Regina is tied up. While Prince Charming tries to escape from The Evil Queen and reunite with Snow White.

It was co-written by Edward Kitsis and Adam Horowitz, while Dean White served as director.

== Title card ==
Clouds of the Dark Curse flows through the Enchanted Forest.

== Plot ==
=== In the characters' past ===
In the Enchanted Forest, as Prince Charming (Josh Dallas) attempts to escape from the Evil Queen's (Lana Parrilla) palace, he finds himself outnumbered by her guards. Just as it seems he will be recaptured, the Huntsman (Jamie Dornan) comes to his aid and kills the guards with his arrows, allowing Charming to escape and continue on his quest to find Snow White (Ginnifer Goodwin). En route, Charming is transported to an infinite forest, thanks to the Queen and her mirror. Rumpelstiltskin (Robert Carlyle) appears and offers to help him but Charming refuses. They fight with swords; Rumpelstiltskin toys with him and soon disarms him. Charming notices his mother's wedding ring is missing. Rumpelstiltskin holds it up and he offers Charming a deal: he will give the prince back his mother's wedding ring, now enchanted to lead him straight to Snow White, if Charming will put a golden egg containing a potion of true love inside "the belly of the beast."

On his search for the beast, Prince Charming enters a castle and finds Maleficent (Kristin Bauer van Straten), seated on a throne. She turns into a dragon – the beast – to attack Charming. He throws the egg into Maleficent's gills and, after he escapes, Rumpelstiltskin returns the ring and magically dresses him in a new set of clothes with which to make his grand return to his true love. As seen in the series premiere, Charming races to Snow White's glass coffin, opens it and kisses her, waking her up. He proposes and she accepts. Together, they begin planning to take back the kingdom from the Evil Queen and Charming's sinister father, King George.

=== In Storybrooke ===
Henry (Jared S. Gilmore) has collapsed after eating the poisoned apple turnover intended for Emma Swan (Jennifer Morrison). She rushes him to the hospital. Dr. Whale (David Anders) asks Emma if the child has eaten anything or if anything untoward has happened. She shows the doctor the turnover but he dismisses any idea of poison because Henry is not showing any symptoms. Almost immediately, Emma begins to suspect magic as the cause. She looks at the Once Upon a Time book, which magically shows her flashbacks of her birth and the night the curse began. It is only now that she finally believes. As Regina (Parrilla) enters the room to see Henry, Emma violently confronts her. A stunned and guilty Regina blurts out that the turnover was indeed meant for her and that the curse is real. The only one who may be able to help them save Henry is Mr. Gold (Carlyle) who is, in fact, Rumpelstiltskin. The two visit Mr. Gold, who now knows that Emma believes in the curse. He tells them that true love has the ability to break any curse and that, as a safeguard, he had imbued the curse's parchment with a drop of that potion made from Snow White and Prince Charming's love. Since Emma is also a product of Snow White and Prince Charming, she is the only one who can end the curse once and for all. Emma will have to retrieve the rest of the potion from its hiding-place in the belly of a beast. He presents her with her father's sword as a weapon against the beast. As to the potion, he remarks that it is with Regina's oldest and only friend.

Elsewhere, David Nolan (Dallas) meets Mary Margaret Blanchard (Goodwin) and tells her that ever since he awoke from the coma, the only thing that has ever made sense to him was her. He goes on to say that he plans on leaving town and moving to Boston unless Mary Margaret gives him a reason to stay. Mary Margaret, moved by his words, still cannot bring herself to take him back and leaves.

Before Emma goes on her quest, she returns to the hospital where she apologizes to the unconscious Henry for not believing him. She then goes to August Booth (Eion Bailey) in an attempt to enlist his help and finds him lying in bed. Now that she believes, she can at last perceive August's body becoming wooden. There is just enough time for her to hear his last words of encouragement before he reverts to puppet form. At the hospital, Regina also apologizes to Henry but is interrupted by Jefferson (Sebastian Stan), who has come to demand the completion of the deal made with Regina to reunite him and his daughter. Regina refuses, on the spurious grounds that Emma had not eaten the turnover as planned. As Regina leaves to join Emma, Jefferson sneaks into the hospital’s underground asylum to release Belle (Emilie de Ravin), instructing her to find Mr. Gold and enlighten him about Regina's doings.

Regina takes Emma to a secret room inside the boarded-up Storybrooke Public Library clock tower. The room contains an elevator, but only one person can go down while the other operates it. Despite her hatred and mistrust for Regina, Emma decides she will descend while Regina stays above ground. As Emma arrives to the bottom, she sees Snow White's glass coffin, then finds herself face-to-face with Maleficent in dragon form. Emma starts fighting with the dragon, but discards the sword and instead fires her gun repeatedly at the beast. She soon realizes that the sword is the only way to kill the dragon. She retrieves the sword and hurls it at the dragon, causing it to explode and release the golden egg containing the love potion.

Meanwhile, Mary Margaret is reading Henry's storybook to him in his hospital bed. As she reads he begins to flat-line.

As Emma ascends in the elevator, it suddenly stops working. She hears Mr. Gold by the controls above her. He tells her that Regina has abandoned her then suggests that Emma should throw the egg up to him and he will wait for her as she climbs up. She complies. When Emma reaches the surface, Gold is nowhere to be found. Regina is tied up and gagged. Emma rescues her, and as they go after Gold, they simultaneously receive calls from the hospital regarding Henry.

When they arrive, they learn that he has died and both grieve. A devastated Emma goes to Henry's body, whispers to him that she loves him and kisses him on the forehead. This act is seen as "true love's kiss:", therefore the pure love shockwave occurs. Emma has broken the curse, bringing Henry back to life and causes everyone in Storybrooke to regain their memories. The Blue Fairy (Keegan Connor Tracy) suggests to Regina that she had best find somewhere to hide as everyone she has wronged will want revenge. Regina runs away, but not before telling a silently-watching Henry that she truly does love him. She returns to her mansion, lamenting her defeat and the loss of the only person she loves.

Regaining his memories, David returns to town and finds Mary Margaret, calling out "Snow!" She responds by calling him Charming, confirming that they both remember. They embrace and rejoice in the fact that they have found each other again. Elsewhere around town, other Storybrooke residents are hit by the pure love shockwave, and they remember their fairytale past including Ruby (Red Riding Hood), Granny, and Archie Hopper (Jiminy Cricket).

Back at the pawn shop, Gold is preparing an as-yet-unknown plan involving the potion, when Belle enters to tell him about what Regina had done to her. Gold is shocked to see Belle still alive and overjoyed to have her back. He sets off for the woods to launch his plan and takes her with him. On their way, the curse is broken and Belle regains her memories, declaring her love for Gold. He tells Belle they will have all the time in the world, but now, they must continue with the plan.

They walk further and reach the wishing well in the woods. Gold tells Belle that the waters that run beneath it have the power to return what one has lost. He drops the love potion into the wishing well, which causes massive amounts of purple smoke to spew out of the well and spread around them. When Belle asks what is happening, Gold tells her that he is bringing the magic that they had once lost back to their world. When asked why, he tells her that magic is power. The purple smoke spreads quickly and engulfs everything (and everyone) in town. Regina watches from her mansion and deviously smiles, knowing that she will once again regain her magical powers.

The last scene shows Prince Charming and Snow White standing in the street holding each other as the purple smoke engulfs them and the clock tower. The hand of the clock moves to the infamous special time: 8:15.

== Production ==
"A Land Without Magic" was co-written by series co-creators Adam Horowitz and Edward Kitsis, while The Shield veteran Dean White returned to direct the episode. The episode was included in Reawakened: A Once Upon a Time Tale – a novelization of the first season – which was published by Hyperion Books in 2013.

== Reception ==
=== Ratings ===
The finale saw the series post its best numbers ever from the previous outing, scoring a 3.3/10 among 18-49s with 9.66 million viewers tuning in. The show won its time slot for the fifth week in a row and helped ABC win that night, despite being up against the first half of the Survivor: One World finale on CBS (which had its lowest-rated outing ever).

In Canada, the episode finished in eighteenth place for the week with an estimated 1.532 million viewers, a decrease from the 1.601 million of the previous episode.

=== Reviews ===
The season finale was well received by critics, especially from Entertainment Weekly's Hilary Busis, who stated that "Lo and behold, earlier this evening I found that all my deepest desires had been granted (Busis made a quote about wanting to see Bauer and Dornan return and for Emma to drop the Scully routine). As executive producers Edward Kitsis and Adam Horowitz promised, "'A Land Without Magic' was a total game-changer—and Once will be an even stronger show next season, thanks to its revelations. For several episodes, it's seemed like this series was rejecting forward momentum on principle; tonight, though, our master plot took a great leap forward. And it's all thanks to the power of Twue Wuv."

EW ranked this episode number one for "Best Non-Romantic Cliffhanger" of the 2012 TV Season Finale Awards. The scene with Prince and Snow kissing ranked number two in "Best Kiss."
