= The Stable Boy =

- Once Upon a Time episode
- Episode no.: Season 1 Episode 18
- Directed by: Dean White
- Written by: Edward Kitsis; Adam Horowitz
- Original air date: April 1, 2012

Guest appearances
- Noah Bean as Daniel; Alan Dale as Albert Spencer; Giancarlo Esposito as Sidney Glass; Anastasia Griffith as Kathryn Nolan; Barbara Hershey as Cora; Bailee Madison as young Snow White; Meghan Ory as Ruby; Tony Perez as Valet; Richard Schiff as King Leopold

Episode chronology
← Previous "Hat Trick"	Next → "The Return"
- Once Upon a Time season 1

"The Stable Boy" is the 18th episode of the American fairy tale/drama television series Once Upon a Time, which aired in the United States on ABC on April 1, 2012.

The series takes place in the fictional seaside town of Storybrooke, Maine, in which the residents are actually characters from various fairy tales that were transported to the "real world" town by a powerful curse.

In this episode, Emma looks for evidence to prove that Regina framed Mary Margaret. In flashbacks, Regina must make a decision for her future: either marry Snow's father or be with her true love.

It was co-written by Adam Horowitz and Edward Kitsis, while Dean White served as director.

== Title card ==
A young Regina Mills rides a horse through the Enchanted Forest.

== Plot ==
=== In Storybrooke ===
A week before Kathryn Nolan's (Anastasia Griffith) disappearance and suspected murder, Mr. Gold (Robert Carlyle) and Regina Mills (Lana Parrilla) plot to frame Mary Margaret (Ginnifer Goodwin) for the crime. While Regina plays with the ring Daniel gave her while staring out the window, Mr. Gold asks her for a favor in getting District Attorney Albert Spencer to drop the battery charges against him, and in return he offers her an idea on how to inflict pain upon Mary Margaret. It also turns out that Mr. Gold and Regina know what happens to people when they try to leave town. When Regina asks how she can trust him, Mr. Gold truthfully responds that he always honors his agreements.

A week later, Elsewhere, Emma Swan (Jennifer Morrison) comes out of the diner as David Nolan (Josh Dallas) catches up with her where he tries to apologize for saying that Mary Margaret was guilty, but Emma informs him that she needs a miracle. Back in the sheriff's office, Mary Margaret is woken by Regina, who offers her a chance to confess, but Mary Margaret stands by her innocence. Regina tells her that confession or not, she is leaving Storybrooke. Later that morning, Emma, Mr. Gold, and Mary Margaret talk about the upcoming case, where Mr. Gold suggest using their most valuable asset, Mary Margaret herself. Sidney Glass (Giancarlo Esposito) then arrives to say that he can’t find anything on Regina. Mary Margaret says she will talk to the district attorney, knowing she has nothing to hide. Unfortunately Regina shows up with Albert Spencer (Alan Dale), the DA and King George's Storybrooke counterpart. He then badgers Mary Margaret during questioning, eventually goading Mary Margaret into admitting she wanted Kathryn gone. Not pleased with Spencer's hostility, Mr. Gold ends the questioning early.

Hours later, Emma studies the book as August Booth (Eion Bailey) approaches her. Emma explains that she is struggling to prove Mary Margaret's innocence, to which he suggests re-looking over what she has already done, causing Emma to re-evaluate the crime scenes. Emma finds a shard of shovel in the ground where the box containing Kathryn's heart was found. Henry Mills (Jared S. Gilmore) radios Emma via a walkie-talkie, explaining that Regina is in the shower and the key is under the mat. Emma and August search the garage and discover a broken shovel, revealing that Regina buried the box. Emma later returns with a search warrant to find that the shovel had been replaced. Emma then accuses August of telling Regina before walking away.

Back in the Sheriff's office, Mary Margaret cries in her cell when Regina comes in to gloat causing Mary Margaret to apologize for anything she did wrong, however Regina tells her she deserves this. Emma later talks to Mr. Gold, who tells her that there is still time for him to work a little magic. In frustration, Emma smashes the vase with the tulips that Sidney brought in, discovering a bug inside and realizes that Sidney was working with Regina. As August comes out of the diner, Emma approaches and apologizes for doubting him and shows him the bug when Ruby (Meghan Ory) screams out: Kathryn is lying in a nearby alley, dazed, yet very much alive.

=== In the Characters' Past ===
In the Enchanted Forest, a young Regina rides her horse as her father (Tony Perez) watches. However, her mother, Cora (Barbara Hershey), approaches and scolds her. Daniel (Noah Bean), the stable boy offers Regina a saddle, but Regina says she’s done riding for the day and begins to stomp away only for Cora to drag her back with magic. An angry Regina tells her to stop using her magic to control her. With that, Regina promises to be good. Later that evening, Regina meets up with Daniel and kisses him.

The next day, Daniel tells Regina to tell her parents about their love. Regina explains to Daniel that she is afraid of her mother’s magic, although Daniel counters that the magic of true love is more powerful. Meanwhile, a young Snow White (Bailee Madison) loses control of her horse nearby, prompting Regina to save her. Later on, Cora changes Regina into a ball gown using magic and explains that King Leopold (Richard Schiff) is coming to thank her for rescuing Snow White. King Leopold comes in and asks Regina for her hand in marriage as she is the first person to have taken an interest in Snow. Later that night, Regina asks Daniel for his hand in marriage, explaining her situation in the process, as well as suggesting that the only way out is to run.

Suddenly, Snow White walks into the stable to witness the pair kissing before running away. Regina manages to catch up to Snow after she trips and falls. When Snow asks why she was kissing Daniel, Regina explains that she loves Daniel and not her father and explains that true love is the most powerful type of magic. Snow smiles after the explanation but Regina makes her promise to keep this secret, to which Snow agrees.

The next day, Snow White is looking at the flowers and reaches up to grab one when Cora comes in and tells her to be gentle. As the two talk, Cora tells Snow White not to fear her, then asks the little girl why Regina has pulled away from her. Snow tells her to not make Regina get married if she wants her to be happy, and that she doesn't love her father. Not wanting Regina to lose her mother like she had, Snow tells Cora about Daniel.

That night, Regina runs into the stable where Daniel is ready to go to make their getaway. They embrace just before Cora arrives and locks the stable. Cora says she will not stop her and Regina hugs her with thanks, then takes Daniel aside and rips his heart out and crushes it, killing him. Regina falls to his side and asks her mother why she has done this, to which Cora tells her that it was because it was her happy ending. After Regina yells and screams of how she loved Daniel, Cora explains that love is weakness.

As Regina is being fitted for her wedding dress, Snow White walks in and tells her that she is the fairest of them all. Snow tells Regina about how she told her mother about Daniel. As Regina listens in horror, she turns and Snow notices how upset she is and she apologizes. Snow White asks Regina if she was mad, but Regina pretends to be happy and tells her no stating that she's happy, and lies that Daniel has left her so that they're both going to be a family. But after Snow White leaves, Regina's behavior starts to change. Cora walks into the room, while Regina guesses that Cora was the cause of Snow's wild horse. Regina then tells Cora that she should have let Snow White die on her horse, unaware the latter was tricked into revealing her relationship.

== Production ==
"The Stable Boy" was co-written by co-creators/executive producers Edward Kitsis and Adam Horowitz, while V veteran, Dean White, returned to direct this installment. The episode was included in Reawakened: A Once Upon a Time Tale – a novelization of the first season – which was published by Hyperion Books in 2013.

== Reception ==
=== Ratings ===
The episode's ratings and viewership was down slightly, but continued to remain steady, scoring an 18-49 rating of 2.8/8 and was watched by 8.36 million viewers, as well as winning its timeslot for the third week in a row despite competing against The Academy of Country Music Awards on CBS.

In Canada, the episode finished in fourteenth place for the week with an estimated 1.409 million viewers, an increase from the 1.337 million of the previous episode.

== Cast ==
=== Starring ===
- Ginnifer Goodwin as Mary Margaret Blanchard
- Jennifer Morrison as Emma Swan
- Lana Parrilla as Young Regina/Regina Mills
- Josh Dallas as David Nolan
- Eion Bailey as August Booth
- Jared S. Gilmore as Henry Mills
- Raphael Sbarge (credit only)
- Robert Carlyle as Mr. Gold

=== Guest Starring ===
- Noah Bean as Daniel/Stable Boy
- Alan Dale as Albert Spencer
- Giancarlo Esposito as Sidney Glass
- Anastasia Griffith as Kathryn Nolan
- Barbara Hershey as Cora
- Bailee Madison as Young Snow White
- Meghan Ory as Ruby
- Tony Perez as Prince Henry
- Richard Schiff as King Leopold

=== Uncredited ===
- Jerry as Rocinante
