= We Are Both =

- Once Upon a Time episode
- David Nolan (Josh Dallas) attempts to stop the inhabitants of Storybrooke leaving
- Episode no.: Season 2 Episode 2
- Directed by: Dean White
- Written by: Jane Espenson
- Original air date: October 7, 2012

Guest appearances
- Tony Amendola as Geppetto/Marco; David Anders as Dr. Whale; Lee Arenberg as Grumpy/Leroy; Sarah Bolger as Princess Aurora; Jamie Chung as Mulan; Beverley Elliott as Granny; Barbara Hershey as Cora; Bailee Madison as young Snow White; Tony Perez as Henry; Raphael Sbarge as Jiminy Cricket/Dr. Archie Hopper; Sebastian Stan as The Mad Hatter/Jefferson; Keegan Connor Tracy as The Blue Fairy/Mother Superior

Episode chronology
← Previous "Broken"	Next → "Lady of the Lake"
- Once Upon a Time season 2

"We Are Both" is the second episode of the second season of the American ABC fantasy/drama television series Once Upon a Time, and the show's 24th episode overall, which aired on October 7, 2012.

It was written by Jane Espenson and directed by Dean White.

In this episode, Regina tries to be a good mother, while flashbacks show her first encounter with Rumpelstiltskin.

== Title card ==
The Enchanted Forest's branches start growing longer.

== Plot ==
=== Event Chronology ===
The Enchanted Forest events take place after "The Stable Boy" and before the flashbacks of Regina in "It's Not Easy Being Green". The Storybrooke events take place after "Broken".

=== In the Characters' Past ===
In the Enchanted Forest, during a horse ride, a young Regina (Lana Parrilla) is prevented from running away by her mother Cora (Barbara Hershey) via magic. Cora wants to make sure that Regina goes through with the wedding to King Leopold and states that Regina is only nervous about having the power that a queen is given, but Regina tells her mother that she wants to be free. Cora replies by saying that power is freedom. After having a daydream in which she strangles a young Snow White (Bailee Madison), Regina tells her father Henry (Tony Perez) about her fear of becoming like Cora. He then explains to her about Cora's past, in which she met a man who gave Cora a book of spells. Later that night, Regina takes the book from under Cora's pillow and summons Rumplestiltskin (Robert Carlyle), the book's owner. Rumplestiltskin reveals that he had known Regina since she was very young and is surprised that she is kind and compassionate, unlike her family trait. When Regina asks him how to deal with Cora, Rumplestiltskin gives her a gift: a looking-glass that acts as a portal to another world.

On the day of the wedding, Regina tries to push Cora into the mirror but fails at her first attempt, unknown to Cora, Rumplestiltskin appears in the mirror and makes pushing gestures. So Regina tries again and succeeds and the glass shatters. Now that she was free of Cora, Regina decides to flee only to have Rumplestiltskin stop her and ask if she liked using magic. When Regina says yes, Rumplestiltskin offers his services to help her learn about magic, on the condition that she will owe him a favor.

=== In Storybrooke ===
At the city limits, the seven dwarves, led by Grumpy/Leroy (Lee Arenberg), congregate at the line of the town's border. They pick straws to see who will be the one to cross it and Sneezy is the unfortunate winner. As the first victim of what happens when residents leave Storybrooke, he loses the memories of his fairytale life and completely becomes his Storybrooke persona, Tom Clark. Meanwhile, as the residents are trying to clean up after the wraith's attack, Geppetto/Marco (Tony Amendola) is putting missing person signs up, hoping to find Pinocchio. Prince Charming/David (Josh Dallas) goes to Regina's house to demand answers about the Mad Hatter/Jefferson's (Sebastian Stan) hat and how to get Emma Swan (Jennifer Morrison) and Snow White/Mary Margaret (Ginnifer Goodwin) back, but Regina pretends she doesn't know how and says she is more concerned about Henry (Jared S. Gilmore). When Charming asks the Blue Fairy/Mother Superior (Keegan Connor Tracy) if there is any way that can send them back, she tells him that there is no fairy dust to make it work. At that moment, the dwarves return and explain what happened to Sneezy after he crossed the city limits, causing the displaced characters to panic. Charming tells the citizens to meet back in two hours and he will tell them his plan.

Later on, Regina, whose magic is not as powerful as it was, visits Rumplestiltskin/Mr. Gold for a favor, which is to win back Henry. Although Mr. Gold refuses to help Regina regain her full powers, he does give her a book and notes that she has become more like her mother, Cora. Meanwhile, as Charming practices his speech to deliver to Storybrooke, Henry notices the hat and tells him that it belongs to the Mad Hatter. Charming stops by Mr. Gold's shop to ask for help and is given a locator spell on the condition that he will stay out of Gold's way. After Charming tells Mr. Gold what happens when people cross the city border, he is enraged and smashes some glass in his shop.

At the town hall, the residents are surprised to see Regina show up instead of Charming as she unleashes her powers, only to be stopped by Henry, who agrees to go with her. Across town, Charming tries the potion on the hat and finds Jefferson, who tells Charming that he can't help him, not knowing that the fairytale world still exists. As Jefferson flees, Charming chases after him and is stopped by Red Riding Hood/Ruby (Meghan Ory), who tells him that Regina took Henry and now the citizens are trying to leave Storybrooke. Charming drives in front of everyone seconds before they cross the town's border and tells them that they will lose their memories of their lives and of their loved ones if they cross the border. He also tells them he wants to remain both David and the Prince, and the people should embrace both identities and memories. He then tells the residents that they will find a way to defeat Regina but will have to do it together. The citizens are moved by the speech and return to Storybrooke. Charming then heads to Regina's house with his sword in tow only to have her relinquish Henry to him without struggle. Regina also reveals that, somehow, the fairytale land does still exist. She contemplates burning the book of spells in her fireplace, but ultimately stashes it away in a safe.

At the diner, Henry tells Geppetto where he can find Pinocchio, but Geppetto finds that he has disappeared from his room. Charming tells Henry that he believes Emma and Snow/Mary Margaret are alive, in the fairytale world, and he can feel their presence.

=== In the Enchanted Forest ===
Hours after waking up from being thrown into the fairy tale land by the wraith, Emma and Mary Margaret have been captured by Mulan (Jamie Chung) and Princess Aurora (Sarah Bolger). They are tied and walking behind Mulan, who is on a horse. After reaching their refuge, an isolated island off a desolate beach, Emma and Mary Margaret attempt to escape, but Mulan flings a bola at Mary Margaret, knocking her out. Mulan orders the refugees to take them to "the pit." As Emma tries to wake up Mary Margaret, she hears a voice offering to help, and it turns out to be Cora, Regina's estranged mother.

== Production ==
"We Are Both" was written by consulting producer Jane Espenson, while being directed by The Shield veteran Dean White.

In an interview with Zap2it, Raphael Sbarge was asked about what viewers can expect from this episode concerning the characters stuck in Storybrooke: "We are now faced with the crisis of consciousness, that is, the curse has ended and now what's to be done?" He also added that "with the awareness that the curse is ended, the fact that the person who has perpetrated the curse does also come front and center. There's some turmoil in Storybrooke for sure and we're seeing some fallout." He also went on to say that "[the creators] are really expanding the canvas of the characters that we know. There's a small army of them coming," says Sbarge. "And in the course of that, those of us who were at the center of the original Storybrooke universe are more on the periphery. It's very similar to what happened on 'Lost,' where things kind of expanded out a bit. We're all there, no one's going anywhere. But there's really an expansion of our family."

In a 2016 interview, Lana Parrilla said that the message, "We are both," informs her interpretation of every episode.

== Cultural references ==
Near the end of the closing scene, the Dwarfs, minus Sneezy, take their pick axes and walk down to the mines, singing "Heigh-Ho." This scene follows the same scene from the Disney film.

== Reception ==
=== Ratings ===
The episode saw a drop from the previous showing (and from last season's second episode), being viewed by 9.84 million people, and garnering a 3.4/9 Nielsen rating/share in the key 18–49 demographic. However, it continued to lead among scripted shows outside NFL Football and The Amazing Race.

=== Reviews ===
The episode received positive reviews from critics.

The Huffington Post's Laura Prudom liked how the storylines came together without being rushed: "The second episode of Season 2, 'We Are Both,' had a lot more breathing room, resulting in an hour that emphasized what the show does best: compelling backstory, fascinating character interplay, and a lot of secrets still to be revealed," adding that it "did an excellent job of peeling back some of those layers, revealing that Rumple has known Regina since she was a baby, and had a particularly unnerving fascination with her back in 'the fairytale land that was.'"

Amy Ratcliffe of IGN gave the episode a 9.5, saying that "this week's 'Once Upon a Time' was full of heart and much needed character development."

The A.V. Club's Oliver Sava gave this episode a B, citing the buildup in how the storylines are starting to come together: "After such a big reveal, it’s underwhelming to spend almost this entire week’s chapter away from Emma and Snow White, showing in the last five minutes that they’ve become prisoners of Aurora and Mulan. Granted, the final shot of this episode justifies the fairyback, but it still cuts into the momentum that this show built up during the season première." Sava also added that "It’s a great acting moment from Josh Dallas, who shows that he can play an authoritative leader as well as he can a lovesick heartthrob."
