= Broken (Once Upon a Time) =

- Once Upon a Time episode
- The mysterious man (Michael Raymond-James) receives a postcard titled "Broken"
- Episode no.: Season 2 Episode 1
- Directed by: Ralph Hemecker
- Written by: Edward Kitsis; Adam Horowitz
- Original air date: September 30, 2012

Guest appearances
- David Anders as Dr. Whale; Lee Arenberg as Grumpy/Leroy; Sarah Bolger as Princess Aurora; Jamie Chung as Mulan; Beverley Elliott as Granny; Julian Morris as Prince Phillip; Michael Raymond-James as Mysterious Man; Raphael Sbarge as Jiminy Cricket/Archie Hopper; Keegan Connor Tracy as The Blue Fairy/Mother Superior

Episode chronology
← Previous "A Land Without Magic"	Next → "We Are Both"
- Once Upon a Time season 2

"Broken" is the first episode of the second season of the American ABC fantasy/drama television series Once Upon a Time, and the show's 23rd episode overall. It premiered September 30, 2012.

In this episode, the aftermath of the Dark Curse being broken and the arrival of magic is explored with the residents of Storybrooke gaining their memories of their past lives and wanting revenge on Regina Mills (particularly a livid Mr. Gold who has found out Belle was locked up by Regina) and Emma Swan dealing with the realization of Henry's theory being true, and that her parents truly are Snow White and Prince Charming. Mr. Gold uses magic against Regina; and later in the Enchanted Forest, Phillip, Aurora, and Mulan face a wraith.

It was co-written by Edward Kitsis and Adam Horowitz, while being directed by Ralph Hemecker.

== Title card ==
A wraith flies through the Enchanted Forest.

== Plot ==
=== Outside Storybrooke ===
The first scene of the episode takes place in New York City, where a dove lands on the windowsill of an apartment owned by an unidentified man (Michael Raymond-James). Stuck to its foot is a postcard from Storybrooke, with the word "Broken" written on it.

=== In Storybrooke ===
In Storybrooke, shortly after the purple smoke (signaling the arrival of magic) introduced by Mr. Gold (Robert Carlyle) has settled into the town, Mary Margaret Blanchard (Ginnifer Goodwin) and David Nolan (Josh Dallas) are reunited in the main street as they have been released from the Dark Curse by their daughter Emma Swan (Jennifer Morrison) and remember their pasts as Snow White and Prince Charming. They emotionally reunite with their old friends and allies from the Enchanted Forest, consisting of Ruby/Red Riding Hood (Meghan Ory), Granny (Beverley Elliott) and the dwarves who all remember their fairy tale pasts. Emma Swan and her son Henry Mills (Jared S. Gilmore) join the group outside the hospital and Emma has an emotional (although very awkward and confusing from Emma's perspective) reunion with her parents, who have lost her to the curse for 28 years. When the group starts questioning why they haven't returned to the Enchanted Forest after the curse's breaking and what the purple fog meant, Mother Superior who was formerly the Blue Fairy (Keegan Connor Tracy) appears and confirms the arrival of magic. Snow White tries to have a conversation with her daughter, though in vain, when Archie Hopper/Jiminy Cricket (Raphael Sbarge) appears to them all panicked as he explains that an enraged Dr. Whale (David Anders) has gathered a mob to head to the residence of Regina Mills, the Evil Queen (Lana Parrilla) in order to kill her as vengeance for the curse. They run after the mob to stop them from killing Regina because Henry still considers her his mother and doesn't want any harm to be done to her and because of the lingering danger that with the return of magic, she may have her powers back which will lead to them getting killed by her instead.

Emma, Henry and their allies arrive just in time to save Regina from Dr. Whale who attempts to attack her after she unsuccessfully tried to use her magic against them. Snow White dissuades the crowd from killing Regina but instead advises them to lock Regina up for the safety of all including even Regina herself. The group later set off to find Mr. Gold, aka, Rumpelstiltskin for answers only for him to show up at Regina's cell after they leave. He is enraged after finding out that she locked Belle (Emilie de Ravin) in an asylum during the 28 years of the Curse and since he promised to Belle that he wouldn't succumb to darkness and kill her, he finds a loophole and marks her with an enchanted amulet that he guarantees will give her "a fate worse than death". He later summons a dangerous creature with his dagger, a wraith, to come and consume Regina's soul.

Emma has Henry go with Ruby as they take care of business and Mary Margaret once again tries to talk with Emma, confused that she isn't happy about their reunion but Emma reminds her that throughout her whole life, she only knew them as people who abandoned her and that she could have had a chance to stay with them had they not sent her away to break the curse. She ends the conversation and reminds them that they still have to find Mr. Gold.

Still livid that he double-crossed her (in the previous episode), Emma and her parents later find him in his shop and she asks what the purple smoke was and Rumpelstiltskin explains that he brought magic back to town although he refuses to tell them why. When they hear an attack taking place, he lets them know that his "gift" (the wraith) will take care of their biggest enemy and threat, Regina. The trio leaves to investigate what is going on in the town and Belle, having overheard the whole conversation, is angered that Rumpelstiltskin has not changed and storms out of the shop. When the wraith, which was the source of the trouble happening in town, finds Regina and attempts to suck her soul, Snow White and Prince Charming scare the monster away and they settle on chasing the creature away, by banishing it to "the oblivion" (referring to the fact that the Curse supposedly "destroyed the fairy tale land", which is false) through the Mad Hatter's magical hat that doubles as a portal to the Enchanted Forest. After many unsuccessful attempts to open up the portal, with support from Emma, Regina manages to open the portal while Snow and Charming fight the creature. The wraith knocks Charming out of the way and goes after Regina who is pushed out of its reach by Emma. The wraith is then sucked in the portal but before it can completely disappear, it drags Emma through the portal and not willing to lose her daughter again, Mary Margaret jumps into the portal as well, leaving David, Regina and the hat behind in a destroyed state. Charming is furious and blames Regina for all this and in retaliation, Regina binds him to the wall and attempts to kill him before Ruby appears with Henry in time for Regina to stop what she is doing. Regina explains what happened to Mary Margaret and Emma and Henry vows not to speak to her until she manages to get Emma and Snow White back. He leaves with his grandfather and Ruby, leaving Regina by herself.

Meanwhile, Belle returns to Mr. Gold and finds him spinning his wheel and having calmed herself, notices the chipped cup and they begin reminiscing about it. He self deprecatingly calls himself a monster and Belle responds that that's why she should stay; to change him. David and Henry move into Mary Margaret's apartment and David promises to a saddened Henry that he will find them, alive and well.

=== In the Enchanted Forest ===
In the Enchanted Forest, Prince Phillip (Julian Morris) awakens Princess Aurora (Sarah Bolger) from a magical sleep with true love's kiss. But they and Phillip's traveling companion, the female warrior Mulan (Jamie Chung), are soon attacked by a wraith, a soul-sucking monster. Unbeknownst to the women, Phillip is "marked" by the wraith's talisman as they drive it off, so the wraith will now follow him relentlessly. After they make camp, Phillip leaves the two women so they will not be harmed when he is attacked. When Aurora notices his absence, Mulan realizes what has happened and goes to pursue him while Aurora insists on following. Aurora then accuses Mulan of being in love with Phillip, but Mulan denies this. They find Phillip and Mulan offers to take on the mark so that Phillip and Aurora can be together, but Phillip refuses. Phillip succumbs to the wraith's attack; his last words are "I love you," and it is left unclear to whom he was speaking. Aurora and Mulan lay Phillip in the palace where Aurora was sleeping.

The final scene of the episode reveals a twist: the storyline of Aurora, Phillip, and Mulan is not a flashback, but rather takes place in a part of the fairytale world whose inhabitants were—for an unknown reason—not removed by the Evil Queen's curse, and is contemporaneous with the Storybrooke plotline. Mulan explains to Aurora that they were frozen in time for 28 years until time resumed, allowing Phillip and Mulan to complete their quest. But the land has been ravaged by the effects of the curse and the survivors had gathered in a safe haven. Before Mulan and Aurora can begin to travel there, they discover Mary Margaret and Emma, unconscious under some debris, and Mulan blames them for the wraith's arrival.

== Production ==
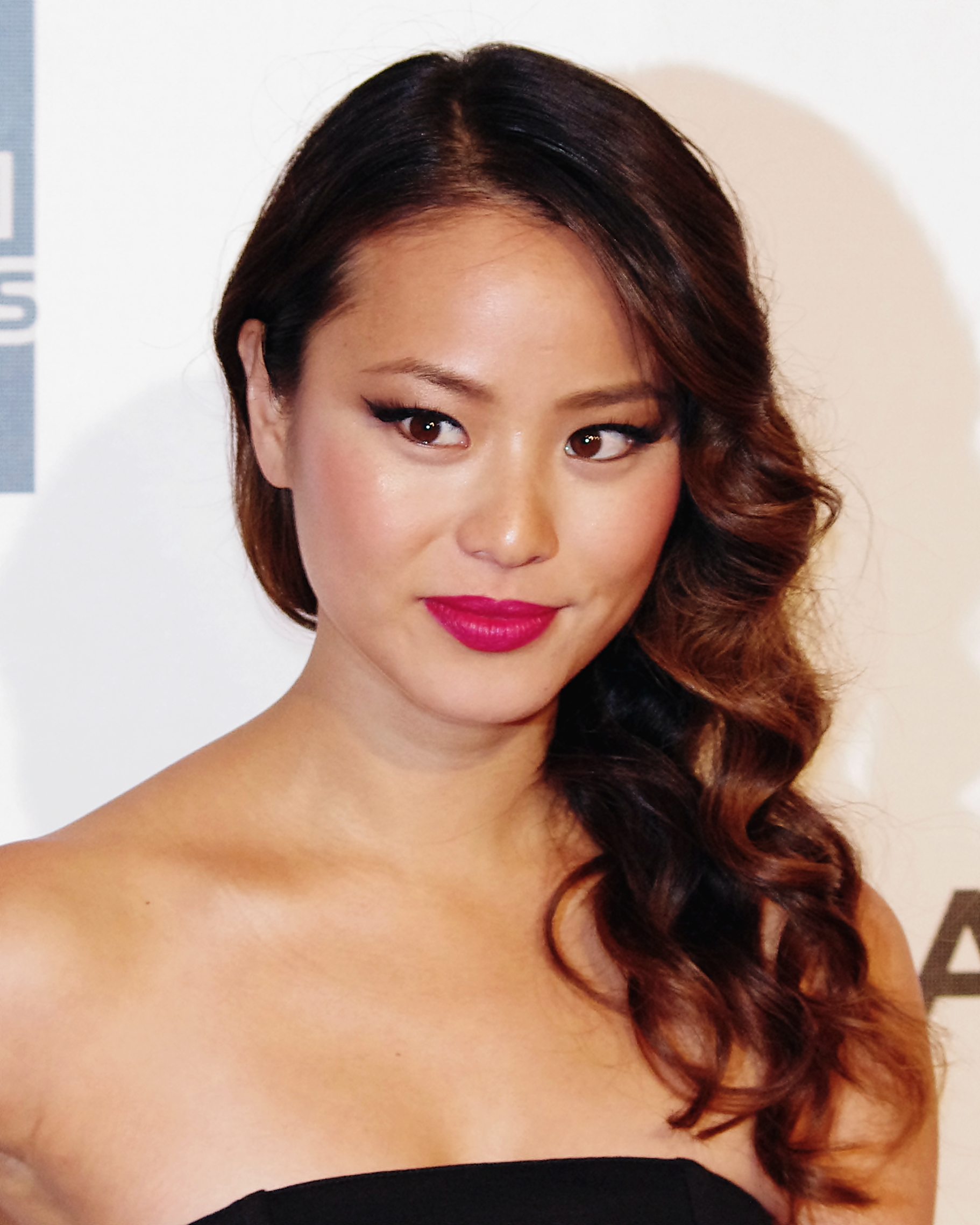
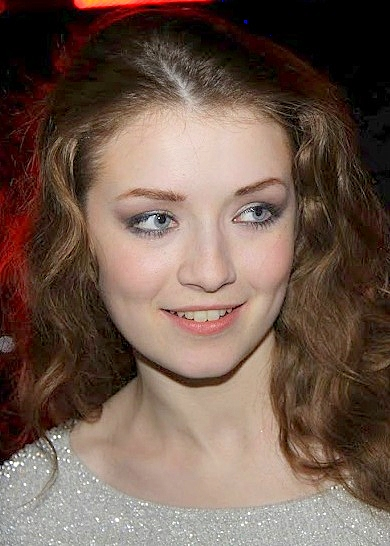
"Broken" featured the first appearances of Jamie Chung (left) as Mulan and Sarah Bolger (right) as Princess Aurora.

"Broken" was co-written by co-creators Edward Kitsis and Adam Horowitz, while being directed by V veteran Ralph Hemecker. With the curse broken in the first season finale, the writers felt that they could now go farther with each of the characters. In an attempt to instill a "whole different vibe" into the series, they envisioned a larger ambition than the previous season. Horowitz explained, "We have been allowed to do more at the start of the [season]. Without addressing the budget, everybody at the studio is on board with this as a big-canvas show… A lot of it actually is the learning-curve aspect of season 1, where we figured out what we can do and how to do it well. We learned how to maximize our bang for our buck. The biggest key is time. If we can figure out our stories far enough in advance, the more time our effects team and department heads will have."

First season recurring actresses Emilie de Ravin (Belle) and Meghan Ory (Red Riding Hood/Ruby) became members of this season's main cast. Two additional actresses who joined the recurring cast were Sarah Bolger as Aurora and Jamie Chung as Mulan, who both made their debuts during this episode.

== Reception ==
=== Ratings ===
On its first broadcast, "Broken" was watched by an estimated 11.36 million viewers, placing second in its timeslot behind NBC's Football Night in America. The episode earned a ratings share of 3.9/10, meaning that it was seen by 3.9 percent of all 18- to 49-year-olds, and 10 percent of all 18- to 49-year-olds watching television at the time of broadcast. The ratings it garnered were considered to be a success for the series, as it was down only five percent from the previous season premiere.

=== Reviews ===
The premiere of season two, "Broken" was received generally positive reviews.

IGN's Amy Ratcliffe graded "Broken" with 8.5 out of 10, an indication of a "great" episode. She found Snow and Emma's descent into the hat to be a "surprising turn of events and a fun way to force them together and make them work out their new mother/daughter roles." Ratcliffe also enjoyed the pairing for Mulan and Aurora, but criticized the wraith for its similarities to the Dementors from Harry Potter. She concluded, "I was worried about the direction of the show once magic was back on the table in such a direct way, but the writers have set the stage for plenty of solid character development. The various relationships and their sorted issues – including Mr. Gold & Belle and Snow & Emma (who is none too pleased with being left without parents for 28 years) -- have such potential. I'm looking forward to seeing what happens next."

Oliver Sava from The A.V. Club gave a B+ rate to the episode saying "Mr. Gold bringing magic back to Storybrooke in a wave of fuchsia fog, and this season 2 opener confirms that this show is going to be a completely different beast going forward."

Laura Prudom from Huffpost TV stated that the writers of the show have pointed the show in a compelling direction with plenty of new mysteries to unravel. "Overall, "Broken" was a gripping and competently plotted hour -- none of the scenes felt extraneous and although there was undoubtedly a lot of plot and set-up to get through in 42 minutes, the narrative certainly felt more liberated without the curse hanging over everyone's heads. I think Horowitz and Kitsis have pointed the show in a compelling direction with plenty of new mysteries to unravel, and I'm eager to see how magic affects our world."
