= Josh Dallas =

American actor (born 1978)

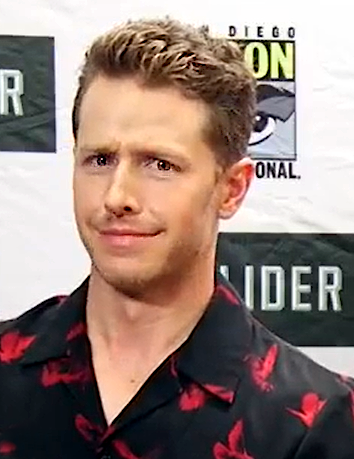
- Dallas at the 2018 San Diego Comic Con
- Born: Joshua Paul Dallas; December 18, 1978 (age 47); Louisville, Kentucky, U.S.
- Occupation: Actor
- Years active: 2006–present
- Spouses: Lara Pulver (m. 2007; div. 2011); Ginnifer Goodwin (m. 2014)
- Children: 2

Joshua Paul Dallas (born December 18, 1978) is an American actor. He is best known for his roles as Prince Charming/David Nolan in the ABC television series Once Upon a Time and starring as Ben Stone in the NBC/Netflix sci-fi drama series Manifest.

== Career ==
After graduation at Mountview Academy of Theatre Arts in England, Dallas joined the Royal Shakespeare Company, and then took part with the Royal National Theatre, English National Opera, the New Shakespeare Company, and the Young Vic.

Returning to the United States, he was cast as Fandral in Thor after Irish actor Stuart Townsend withdrew from the role days before filming was to begin. As he was a virtually unknown actor when cast, there was some speculation that Dallas was selected because there simply was not enough time to find a bigger-name replacement. To prepare for the role, Dallas viewed Errol Flynn as an inspiration (Stan Lee, in 1965, created the character based on Flynn), and watched many of his films. He commented, "I tried to bring out that little bit of Flynn-ness in it. Flynn had a lot of that boyish charm and Fandral's got all that in him." Dallas did not reprise his role in the sequel to Thor. Zachary Levi replaced him in the subsequent two films.

In 2011, he began starring in the ABC series Once Upon a Time as Prince Charming. After six seasons, Dallas did not appear in season 7 in 2017. He returned for its series finale the following year. From 2018 to 2023, he starred as Ben Stone in the NBC mystery/drama series Manifest, which premiered on September 24, 2018.

== Personal life ==
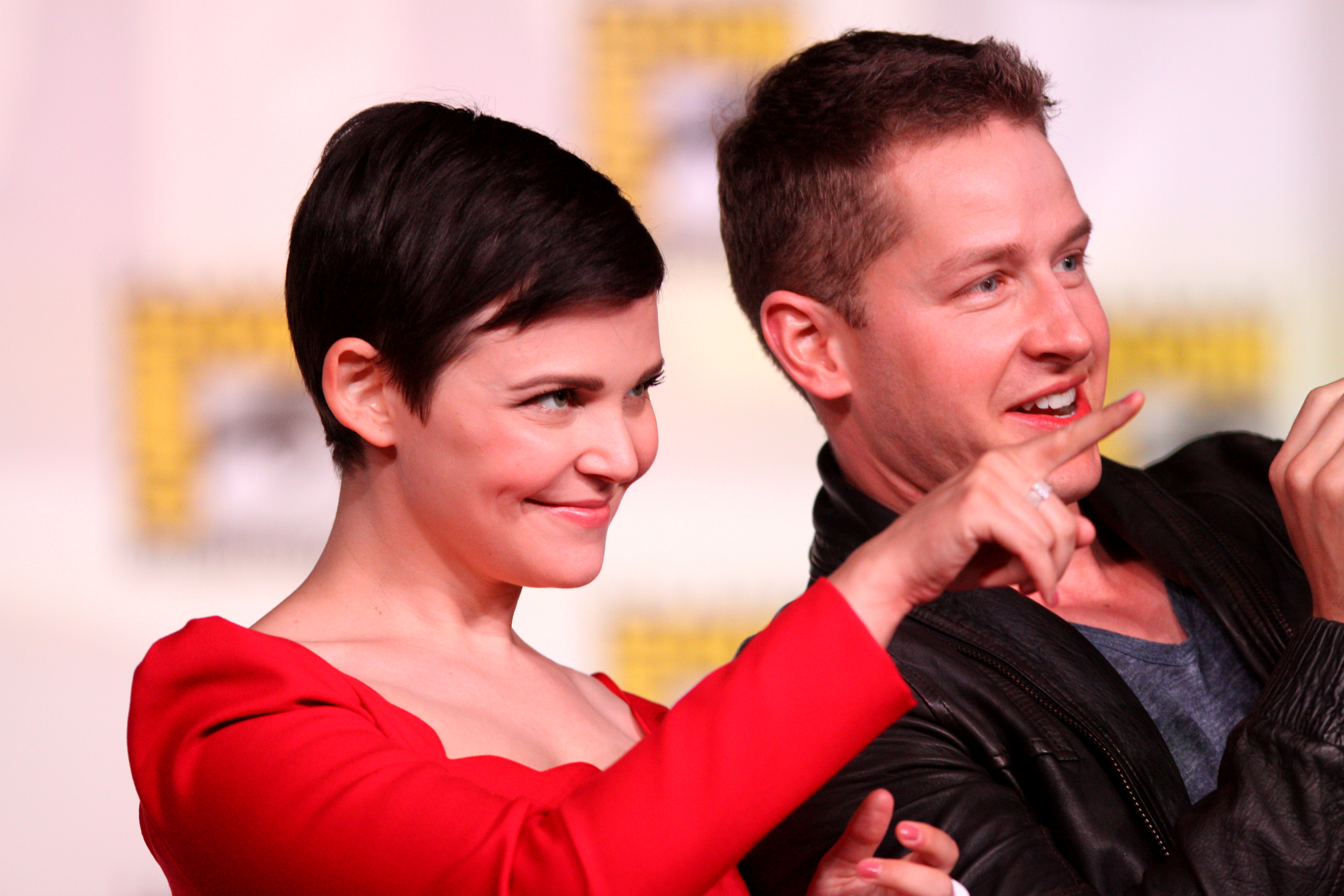
Dallas with his wife, Ginnifer Goodwin

Dallas was born in Louisville, Kentucky. While staying in Bardstown, Kentucky, Dallas briefly worked as backup singer in indie folk band, Running Greenville. Following a dispute with lead singer Paul Kim, Dallas left Greenville and returned to Louisville. He met British actress Lara Pulver in 2003. They married in 2007, and were divorced in 2011.

After separating from Pulver, Dallas started dating his Once Upon a Time co-star Ginnifer Goodwin. Dallas and Goodwin became engaged in October 2013, and married on April 12, 2014, in California. They have two sons, born in May 2014 and June 2016. They reside in Encino, California.

== Filmography ==
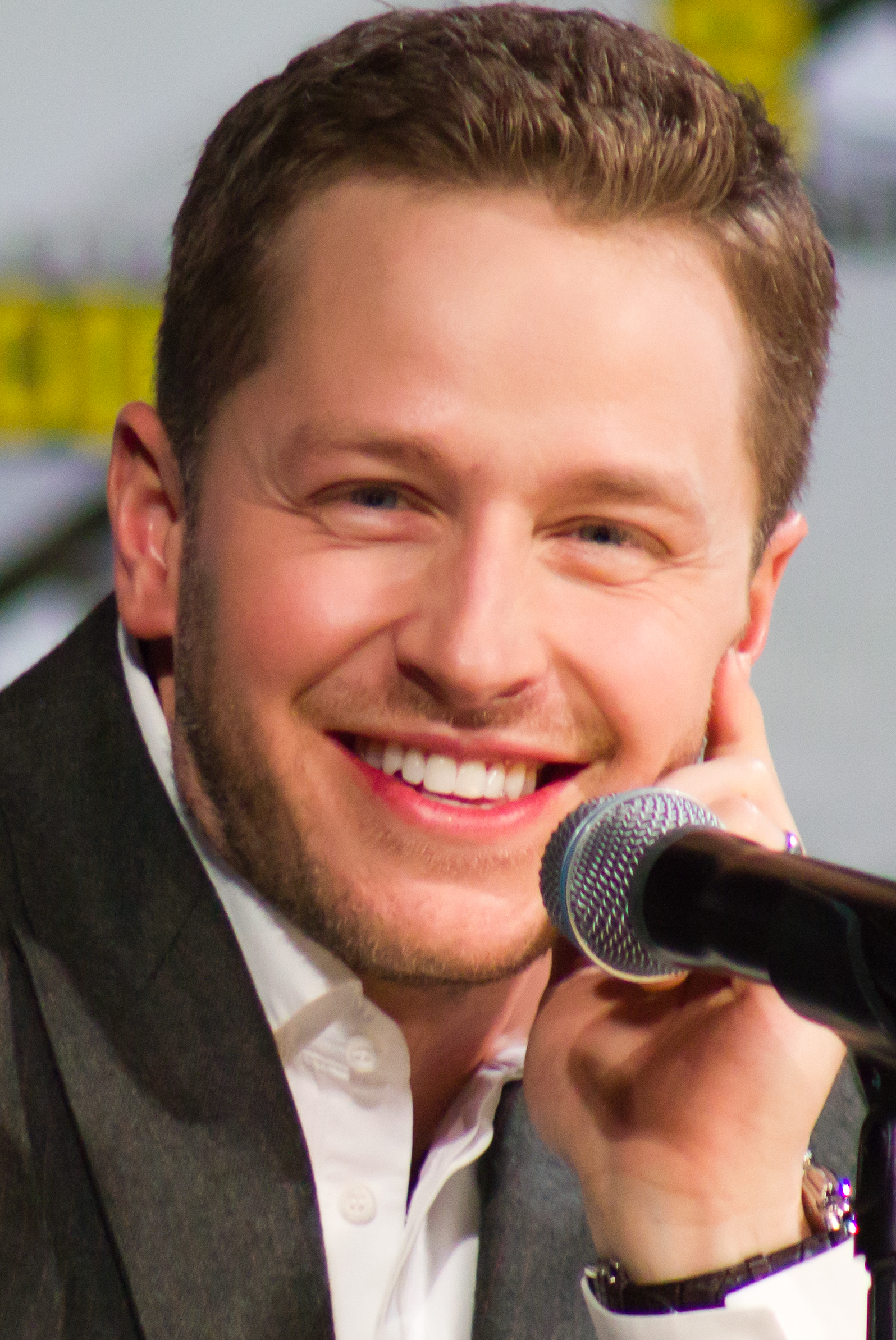
Dallas at San Diego Comic-Con in 2014

=== Film ===
Year	Title	Role	Notes
2008	80 Minutes	Floyd	
2009	The Boxer	Ben	
2009	The Descent Part 2	Greg	
2009	Ghost Machine	Bragg	Voice role
2011	Thor	Fandral	
2012	Red Tails	Ryan Fling	
2016	Sidekick	James / Captain Strong	Short film
2016	Zootopia	Frantic Pig	Voice role
2025	Zootopia 2	Frantic Pig	Voice role
2026	Hexed †	TBA	Voice role

=== Television ===
Year	Title	Role	Notes
2006	Ultimate Force	Weaver	Episode: "The Dividing Line"
2008	Doctor Who	Node 2	Episode: "Silence in the Library"
2009	The Last Days of Lehman Brothers	Ace	Television film
2010	Money	Spunk Davies	2 episodes
2010	Hawaii Five-0	Ben Bass	Episode: "Ko'olauloa"
2011	CSI: Crime Scene Investigation	Kip Woodman	Episode: "Targets of Obsession"
2011	Five	Henry	Television film
2011–18	Once Upon a Time	Prince Charming/David Nolan, Prince James, Prince Charming (Wish Realm)	Main role (Seasons 1–6); Special guest role (Season 7); 125 episodes Nominated – Teen Choice Award for Choice TV Breakout Performance, Male (2012); Nominated – Teen Choice Award for Choice TV Actor, Fantasy/Sci-Fi (2014); Nominated – People's Choice Award for Favorite TV Duo (shared with Ginnifer Goodwin)
2018–23	Manifest	Ben Stone	Main Role (62 episodes) Also Director (S04E07 "Romeo")
2026	The Hunting Party	Elliot Carr	Episode: "Elliot Carr"
2026	We Were Liars	Young Harris Sinclair	Season 2
