= In the Name of the Brother =

- Once Upon a Time episode
- Episode no.: Season 2 Episode 12
- Directed by: Milan Cheylov
- Written by: Jane Espenson
- Original air date: January 20, 2013

Guest appearances
- David Anders as Dr. Victor Frankenstein/Dr. Whale; Lee Arenberg as Grumpy/Leroy; Chad Michael Collins as Gerhardt; Ethan Embry as Greg Mendell; Barbara Hershey as Cora/The Queen of Hearts; Gregory Itzin as Alphonse; Colin O'Donoghue as Captain Killian "Hook" Jones

Episode chronology
← Previous "The Outsider"	Next → "Tiny"
- Once Upon a Time season 2

"In the Name of the Brother" is the 12th episode of the second season of the American ABC fantasy/drama television series Once Upon a Time, and the show's 34th episode overall, which aired on January 20, 2013.

In this episode Dr. Whale has to face his fears with helping people, while flashbacks show Victor Frankenstein bringing his brother back from the dead.

It was written by Jane Espenson and directed by Milan Cheylov.

== Title card ==
Rumpelstiltskin walks through the Enchanted Forest.

== Plot ==
=== In the characters' past ===
In a black-and-white land, Dr. Victor Frankenstein (David Anders) and his father, Alphonse (Gregory Itzin), toast the Silver Cross that has been awarded to Alphonse's younger son, Gerhardt (Chad Michael Collins), a military officer. Alphonse then gives Victor a military commission that will require him to give up his scientific research, which he will no longer finance. Later, Rumplestiltskin (Robert Carlyle)--who appears in color—observes Victor telling Gerhardt that he will find a way to continue his research. Rumplestiltskin then appears in Victor's lab and offers him a vast amount of gold if he can teach him how to restore life. Victor accepts the offer.

Gerhardt finds Victor digging up a body from a graveyard to use for his experiments. They are interrupted by a guard, who fatally shoots Gerhardt. Victor attempts to revive Gerhardt in the laboratory, but the procedure burns his heart into charcoal. Alphonse discovers what has happened and disowns Victor. Rumplestiltskin appears again and offers Victor a magical heart in exchange for "putting on a show" for his "friend," Regina. After receiving the heart, Victor successfully brings Gerhardt back to life. Alphonse is initially pleased, but becomes dismayed when he discovers Gerhardt is now an animalistic "monster." He assaults Victor, which prompts Gerhardt to attack Alphonse. Victor stands by and allows Gerhardt to beat him to death, after which Gerhardt becomes distraught and runs off.

Some time later, Victor visits Gerhardt, whom he keeps in a cell. Gerhardt attacks him, but then recognizes him and is traumatized yet again. Victor puts a gun to Gerhardt's head, but cannot bring himself to pull the trigger, even after Gerhardt himself pulls the gun back into position for the fatal shot. Victor declares he will find a way to save Gerhardt.

=== In Storybrooke ===
In the aftermath of the shooting and the car accident, Mr. Gold uses magic to heal Belle's (Emilie de Ravin) injuries, frightening her. Emma Swan (Jennifer Morrison), Mary Margaret (Ginnifer Goodwin), and David (Josh Dallas) arrive on the scene and they prevent Gold from killing Captain Hook (Colin O'Donoghue) by pointing out that Belle, if she were herself, would not want him to. Paramedics arrive to take Belle, Hook, and the driver of the car (Ethan Embry)--a stranger from outside of Storybrooke—to the hospital.

At the hospital, Dr. Whale drinks alcohol and does not immediately respond to a page. The patients are brought in, accompanied by Emma, Mary Margaret, David, Gold, Leroy (Lee Arenberg), and Ruby (Meghan Ory). Everyone is agitated, but Dr. Whale arrives and tries to calm them down, promising Gold that Belle is in good hands. Emma questions a handcuffed Hook, whose ribs are injured, as to Cora's (Barbara Hershey) whereabouts, but he claims he doesn't know where she is. She warns him he's likely to be dead soon, after having crossed Gold.

Emma and the others examine the stranger's belongings and learn that he is Greg Mendell, a tourist who has been sightseeing in New England. They realize that outsiders are no longer deterred from entering Storybrooke. They worry that Greg's friends or family will come looking for him and that they could be in danger if the world at large learns of their magical natures. Meanwhile, Mary Margaret is concerned that Cora will find Regina (Lana Parrilla) before they do, but nobody has seen her since she fled. Dr. Whale asks Gold to heal Greg of his serious injuries, but Gold refuses, telling them that they should hope Greg dies, since he saw him use magic. Dr. Whale offers to let Greg die but the group, led by Mary Margaret and David, agrees they must save Greg's life in spite of what it may mean for Storybrooke. After Dr. Whale leaves, Mary Margaret notes that he is drunk. Then Greg's phone rings, a call from someone who is in his contact list as "Her."

David urges Whale to prepare for the surgery. Greg's phone continues to receive calls from "Her," and everyone continues to debate about how to deal with the situation. They eventually realize that Whale has left the hospital. Ruby tracks him to the end of the pier. He jumps, but her wolf reflexes enable her to catch him. As a werewolf, she listens with sympathy to Whale's experiences as Dr. Frankenstein. For him, science, like magic, has come with a price. He had hoped the name Frankenstein would stand for life, and Ruby tells him it still can if he saves Greg's life.

Cora, disguised as Henry (Jared S. Gilmore), enters the vault hidden beneath Regina's father's tomb and calls out to Regina, who has been living in a hidden chamber there. She opens the door for him and Cora reveals herself and that she framed Regina for Archie's murder. Cora declares that she loves Regina and apologizes for forcing her to marry King Leopold. She tells Regina she framed her to reveal what the other residents of Storybrooke really think of her, but Regina points out that anyone would have believed the airtight case Cora created. Regina realizes that Cora did it because she wanted her broken. She insists that Cora come with her to turn herself in, feeling that she deserves from Cora what she has been trying to give Henry—the effort to become worthy of one's child. Cora agrees, but during the car ride, she goads Regina over her loss of Henry and the impossibility of reclaiming him with Emma, Mary Margaret, and David in the picture. Regina acknowledges that she doesn't care how Emma and the others feel about her; she just wants her son back. Regina allows her mother to hold her, ready to hear her plan.

At the hospital, Dr. Whale informs everyone that Greg will live, though he may need weeks of recuperation. He is regaining consciousness, so Emma goes to question him—both to determine if he saw magic and to establish a "normal" appearance to things. Greg tells Emma that he was texting while driving. Relieved that he didn't see anything, she lets him off with a warning and returns his belongings.

A subplot centered on Mr. Gold plays out throughout the episode. Gold kisses a sleeping Belle at the hospital; she awakens and screams at him until he leaves. Later, Cora comes to Gold's shop, offering a truce. She gives him a magical globe that can help him find his son, and in exchange, he agrees not to interfere with her efforts to reunite with Regina. They seal the agreement with a handshake and with a kiss, which Cora describes as "how [they] used to." Gold then brings Belle the cup she chipped, which he has enchanted in an effort to restore her memories. She becomes upset at the mention of magic and throws the cup, shattering it. He apologizes and leaves. He places a drop of his blood on Cora's gift, which indicates a location on the East Coast of the United States.

In the morning, Mary Margaret, David, and Emma fill Henry in on the night's events. Henry realizes that the story of Frankenstein isn't in his book and isn't even a fairy tale; he begins to wonder who else might be in Storybrooke. Gold then arrives and tells Emma that he's calling in the favor she owes him: she must leave Storybrooke with him that day to aid him in his search for his son. Also, he threatens to kill all of them if any harm comes to Belle in his absence. Meanwhile, Greg calls someone he calls "honey" and says that he was in an accident and that he has seen something unbelievable.

== Production ==
"In the Name of the Brother" was written by consulting producer Jane Espenson, while being directed by 24 vet Milan Cheylov.

According to David Anders, this episode was intended to seed a romance between Ruby and Whale, who were seen arm in arm at the end of the episode. According to Anders these plans were shelved due to Ory being cast in the short-lived CBS series Intelligence. After the aforementioned show's cancellation Anders himself was cast in the CW series iZombie, leading to Ruby's pairing with Dorothy Gale in the season five episode "Ruby Slippers", in which the character returned.

== Cultural references ==
This episode makes a reference to the 1991 version of Beauty and the Beast, through a reference to the Chip character that was unique to that version; the chipped cup representing that character was first shown in the episode Skin Deep. There are references to Mary Shelley's 1818 novel Frankenstein; or, The Modern Prometheus, including visuals recalling the 1931 film and multiple comments about the confusion between the names of Dr. Frankenstein and his monster. Red's comparison of Dr. Frankenstein to "the werewolf" refers to Frankenstein Meets the Wolf Man and the fact that both were part of the Universal Monsters franchise.

The ringtone from Greg's cellphone is the theme from Star Wars, reflecting ABC's parent corporation The Walt Disney Company's recent acquisition of Lucasfilm in October 2012.

Grumpy/Leroy mentions two films, 1982's E.T. the Extra-Terrestrial and 1983's Splash, as examples of how extraordinary things discovered in the real world are likely to be "studied to death."

The name of the character Greg Mendell is similar to that of Gregor Mendel, who is known as the father of modern genetics. It is not known if this reference is deliberate, or what its significance is. Mendell acknowledges that it is against the law to text while driving in Maine, accurately reflecting a state law that went into effect on September 26, 2011.

== Reception ==
=== Ratings ===
This episode was at the time the lowest rated in the series' run, with a 2.4/6 among 18-49s and only 7.68 million viewers tuning in, although it was the third most watched program of the night. The low numbers can likely be attributed to CBS' prime time airing of the AFC playoff game.

=== Reviews ===
The episode received mixed reviews from critics.

Entertainment Weekly critic Hilary Busis gave it a mixed review: "Unfortunately, 'In the Name of the Brother' ended up being an exercise in wheel-spinning that seemed to exist only to set up the show's next hour.... Dangit, Kitsis and Horowitz! Quit playing games with our hearts!"

Oliver Sava of The A.V. Club gave it a C+: "Just when it looked like Once Upon A Time was on the road to improvement, along comes 'In The Name Of The Brother,' a nonsensical episode that forces events in motion without letting them progress naturally in the story. All the semi-villainous characters are returned to full-on bad guy mode by the end of the hour, and the fairyback feels especially tacked on to make actions that seem out of character slightly more plausible. Back in my review of 'The Doctor,' I applauded the introduction of a black-and-white world where public domain horror characters could exist, but after this episode, it appears that the introduction of this new realm is a way for the writers to avoid telling meaningful stories with the main characters of this show. It’s a case of expansion pulling attention from what’s actually important in this show, and with Dr. Frankenstein’s story this week, the conflict just doesn’t make all that much sense."

Alex Kranz of Fem Pop while critical of the episode, yet praised the interaction between Meghan Ory and David Anders, calling it the former's best performance to date on the show and calling to see the latter be made a regular.
