= Tiny (Once Upon a Time) =

- Once Upon a Time episode
- Episode no.: Season 2 Episode 13
- Directed by: Guy Ferland
- Written by: Christine Boylan; Kalinda Vazquez
- Original air date: February 10, 2013

Guest appearances
- Lee Arenberg as Grumpy/Leroy; Abraham Benrubi as Arlo the Giant; Alan Dale as King George; Beverley Elliott as Granny; Ethan Embry as Greg Mendell; Cassidy Freeman as Jacqueline "Jack"; Jorge Garcia as Anton the Giant/Tiny; Colin O'Donoghue as Captain Killian "Hook" Jones

Episode chronology
← Previous "In the Name of the Brother"	Next → "Manhattan"
- Once Upon a Time season 2

"Tiny" is the 13th episode of the second season of the American ABC fantasy/drama television series Once Upon a Time, and the show's 35th episode overall, which aired on February 10, 2013.

It was co-written by Kalinda Vazquez and Christine Boylan, while being directed by Guy Ferland.

This episode centers around the Giant as he accidentally believes David is James, while flashbacks show the Giant's history with David's brother. Also, Emma and Henry accompany Mr. Gold on his search to find his son.

== Title card ==
Anton the Giant uproots a tree in the Enchanted Forest.

== Plot ==
=== In the Characters' Past ===
A group of giant brothers gather for dinner in their castle in the sky to celebrate the once-a-century harvest of magic beans. Anton (Jorge Garcia), the shortest among them, is nicknamed "Tiny" and is mocked for his interest in humans. The leader of the giants, Arlo (Abraham Benrubi), explains that humans used the beans for conquest instead of exploration, so the giants now conceal themselves and the beans. Anton asks why they still grow the beans, as the giants also don't use them, and Arlo says the labor itself is worthwhile. Another brother, Abraham (C. Ernst Harth), then breaks a human harp that interested Anton, and an angry Anton climbs down the beanstalk to the human world.

King George (Alan Dale) interrupts the original Prince James's (Josh Dallas) dalliance with Jacqueline (Cassidy Freeman) to inform him of the presence of a giant in the kingdom, which he hopes to use to their advantage. James and Jacqueline find Anton. Jacqueline introduces herself by her nickname, "Jack," and gives Anton a magic mushroom that will temporarily make him human-sized. They show him hospitality and then allow him to learn that the kingdom is destitute. Anton offers to bring treasure to help his new friends and the kingdom where he now hopes to live, but claims the giants have no magic beans.

Anton later returns to his home to gather treasure. Arlo tries to warn him that the humans won't accept him, but Anton doesn't believe him until James and Jack appear, intent on taking the beans. With poisoned swords, their army is able to effectively fight the giants. Abraham is killed and Arlo orders Anton to burn and salt the fields. Jack stabs Arlo but he also wounds her with the poisoned sword. James flees with a sack of treasure, leaving Jack to die. All the giants but Anton are killed. A dying Arlo gives Anton a beanstalk cutting in the hopes that he will someday find somewhere to plant it.

=== In Storybrooke ===
Mr. Gold (Robert Carlyle) arrives at Mary Margaret's (Ginnifer Goodwin) apartment to bring Emma Swan (Jennifer Morrison) on his quest to search for Baelfire. Gold reluctantly agrees to Emma's new demand that Henry (Jared S. Gilmore) accompany them. David asks Gold to take care of Emma and Henry, and Gold promises no harm will come to them. The three drive out of Storybrooke and Gold retains his memories and identity as Rumplestiltskin. Later, Regina (Lana Parrilla) comes to the apartment to protest her innocence in the murder of Archie. David and Mary Margaret tell her that she was framed by Cora, and Regina pretends not to have been aware of her mother's presence. Regina is aggravated to learn that Emma has taken Henry from Storybrooke. David, Mary Margaret, and Leroy then force Hook (Colin O'Donoghue) to take them aboard his ship. Hook reveals that Cora's plans involve the contents of a tarp-covered cage that proves to contain a sleeping, human-sized Anton. Mary Margaret wakes Anton to ask him about Cora's plans. Anton is dismayed to discover that Cora has shrunk him, then attacks David after apparently recognizing him. Mary Margaret drives him away with arrows. Mary Margaret surmises that Anton's real enemy was David's twin.

Regina, in Cora's stead, meets with Hook, who informs her about Anton. She brings Anton a mushroom that temporarily restores his size. Anton then rampages through the town. As they race through the streets, Leroy asks David what his real name is and David clarifies that his curse name was also the name he was born with in the Enchanted Forest: James was his twin brother who died and Prince Charming was a nickname that Mary Margaret gave him. David confronts Anton and explains that the real Prince James is dead. Mary Margaret tells Anton that Emma is their daughter, and Anton asks to have Emma vouch for them. Told that she is out of town, an enraged Anton concludes that all humans are liars and resumes his attacks. David offers to surrender himself if Anton will spare everyone else. When Anton leaps towards David, he crashes through the ground into a sinkhole just as the mushroom wears off, leaving him human-sized and clinging to a pipe. David leads the townspeople in rescuing a despondent Anton from the pit, restoring his faith in humans.

Anton is welcomed by the townspeople. He reveals the beanstalk stems and is brought to fertile farmland where he could grow beans, making it possible to return to the Enchanted Forest. He warns that Cora planned for him to grow the beans, so Mary Margaret says they won't let her get them. The dwarves arrive and pledge themselves to cultivating and protecting the beans. They give Anton a pickaxe to use for tillage, and it names him "Tiny." The dwarves accept him as a brother. That night, David wonders what kind of person he would be if King George had raised him, but Mary Margaret reassures him that he has a good heart. She admits that she had been craving excitement, and they agree that they enjoyed the day's adventure. But when David talks about returning to the Enchanted Forest, Mary Margaret declares she will not go back if it means being separated from Emma.

Meanwhile, Ruby (Meghan Ory) visits the still-amnesiac Belle (Emilie de Ravin) at the hospital and brings her a book. Belle asks Ruby about Mr. Gold's inexplicable powers, and Ruby suggests Belle simply had a nightmare due to her medication. Belle becomes agitated and a nurse sedates her, which Greg Mendell (Ethan Embry) observes. Later, he tells Belle that he also saw Gold holding a ball of fire.

=== Outside Storybrooke ===
At Boston's Logan International Airport, Mr. Gold is required to place his scarf, the talisman that protects his memories, in a bin at the security checkpoint. He becomes weak and disoriented until Emma puts it back on him after they are screened. Later, Gold angrily hits a bathroom fixture and bloodies his knuckles, then finds that he is unable to magically heal the injury. Gold, Emma, and Henry board the plane and its destination is announced: New York City.

== Production ==
"Tiny" was co-written by producers Christine Boylan and Kalinda Vazquez. Homeland vet Guy Ferland served as the installment's director. This marks the second time that Jorge Garcia and Jennifer Morrison have worked together. The other was on How I Met Your Mother season 6 episode 10 Blitzgiving

== Cultural references ==
- In the hospital, Belle watches an episode of Exposé, a fictional show-within-a-show that existed on Lost as well.
- The airline that Mr. Gold, Emma, and Henry are flying is "Ajira Airways," one of the airline companies from Lost.
- When they begin to farm, the dwarves whistle "Heigh-Ho," from Disney's Snow White and the Seven Dwarfs.
- In the hospital, Red gives Belle the book The Mysterious Island, a reference to Jules Verne and the Island on Lost. It is the same book Quorra shows Sam in Tron: Legacy, which was also written by Adam Horowitz and Edward Kitsis.
- Some aspects of Anton's life are references to the Disney film, The Little Mermaid. Anton's interest in humans and the secrecy of the giants' world is similar to Ariel and the undersea kingdom in the movie. Additionally, all the giants have names that begin with A, as do Ariel and her sisters.
- One of the Giants is named "Andre," a reference to the wrestler/actor André the Giant.

== Reception ==
=== Ratings ===
This episode was the lowest rated in the series' run to that point (taking that distinction from the previous outing), in part because it was up against both the 2013 Grammy Awards (which saw a major drop in its numbers from its 2012 telecast but nevertheless won the night) and the return of The Walking Dead. "Tiny" earned a 2.2/5 among 18-49s and had only 7.02 million viewers tuning in, making it the third most watched program of the night for the second time this season. In addition, a winter storm left portions of the eastern United States without power, which might have affected the ratings for all Sunday evening programming nationwide.

=== Reviews ===
The episode received mixed reviews from critics.

Entertainment Weekly critic Hilary Busis gave it a mildly good review, but added, "Like 'In the Name of the Brother,' it spent precious time giving backstory about a character who didn't really need more backstory; also like Once's previous episode, it did little to move season 2's master plot forward. But hey: At least we got more goofy-looking Giant Land CGI!" The Huffington Post's Laura Prudom liked the episode and cited Josh Dallas's performance as Prince James and Jorge Garcia's return as Anton among the best highlights in the outing.

Amy Ratcliffe of IGN gave the episode a 6.3, stating that "'Once Upon a Time delivered a ho-hum giant story in this week's episode. Also, there were magic beans."

Oliver Sava of The A.V. Club gave it a C and was not impressed with the outing: "Why does Once Upon A Time have to be so infuriating? The quality of the series varies wildly not just from episode-to-episode, but from scene-to-scene. Jack the Giant Slayer is about to open in theaters (referring to the ad for the film that ran during the commercial break), and this show taps into the fairy tale’s boost in popularity by spotlighting Anton the Giant for an entire episode... It seems like a lot of wheels are in motion, but the acting and writing are so inconsistent that it feels like not much is happening at all."
