= The Outsider (Once Upon a Time) =

- Once Upon a Time episode
- Episode no.: Season 2 Episode 11
- Directed by: David Solomon
- Written by: Andrew Chambliss; Ian Goldberg
- Original air date: January 13, 2013

Guest appearances
- Tony Amendola as Geppetto/Marco; Lee Arenberg as Dreamy/Grumpy/Leroy; Jamie Chung as Mulan; Beverley Elliott as Granny; Chris Gauthier as William Smee; Julian Morris as Prince Phillip; Colin O'Donoghue as Captain Killian "Hook" Jones; Raphael Sbarge as Jiminy Cricket/Dr. Archibald "Archie" Hopper; Keegan Connor Tracy as The Blue Fairy/Mother Superior; Ethan Embry as Greg Mendell (uncredited)

Episode chronology
← Previous "The Cricket Game"	Next → "In the Name of the Brother"
- Once Upon a Time season 2

"The Outsider" is the 11th episode of the second season of the American ABC fantasy/drama television series Once Upon a Time, and the show's 33rd episode overall, which aired on January 13, 2013.

In this episode Belle goes up against Hook, while flashbacks show Belle befriending Mulan.

It was co-written by Ian Goldberg and Andrew Chambliss, while being directed by David Solomon.

== Title card ==
The flaming monster Yaoguai walks through the Enchanted Forest.

== Plot ==
=== In the Characters' Past ===
Belle (Emilie de Ravin) sits in a tavern and takes note of a group of men organizing an expedition to hunt a monster called the Yaoguai that terrorizes a distant kingdom. Dreamy (Lee Arenberg) arrives to thank her for the advice she gave him the previous night; he and Nova plan to run away together. He realizes that Belle yearns for adventure and is interested in the hunt for the Yaoguai. She insists she finds adventure enough in her books, but ultimately goes along with his suggestion that she join the hunters. Dreamy gives her a pouch of fairy dust.

Belle reads a book, written in a foreign language (Chinese), as the hunting party travels in a wagon and the others—all men—mock her. After she tells them that the book identifies a lake as the Yaoguai's likely location, they abandon her in the road. However, she lied to them; mountains are the Yaoguai's preferred habitat, and she quickly locates its lair. But she is unable to sneak up on the creature's cave, and it emerges; it is a large quadruped with a mane of fire. Arrows are fired and the Yaoguai flees. Belle thanks her savior, who turns out to be a female warrior, Mulan (Jamie Chung), who is angry that Belle has spoiled the two weeks she spent tracking the Yaoguai. Belle explains that she found the creature much more quickly than that and offers to help find it again, but Mulan rejects the offer.

Later, the hunters confront Belle over her lie and they assault her. Mulan appears and easily fights the men off. She tells Belle of how she learned to hold her own against disrespectful men when she served in her emperor's army. She acknowledges that Belle's tracking skills are superior to her own, and they agree to work together in the hunt for the Yaoguai so that Mulan can save her village. The original plan is for Mulan to fight the beast after Belle tracks it, however, Mulan was injured fighting the men and is now too weak. She asks Belle to confront the Yaoguai, encouraging her to find her "warrior spirit."

Belle is able to lure the Yaoguai into the village, where she uses a water tower to douse it. After the Yaoguai collapses to the ground, it uses its claw to write a message, "Save me." Belle throws the fairy dust onto the Yaoguai, and it turns into Prince Phillip (Julian Morris). He explains that Maleficent cursed him by exiling him far from his kingdom in a monstrous form in order to keep him apart from his true love, Aurora. In thanks for saving him, Belle asks only that he help Mulan get the medical attention she needs. She takes Phillip to the woods and introduces him to Mulan, explaining what has happened. Belle then departs, planning to return to Rumplestiltskin (Robert Carlyle). She is taken prisoner by the Evil Queen (Lana Parrilla), her location having been betrayed by the men from the hunt (one of which had been shown to guard her jail cell). The Queen claims she is sparing Belle from the misery of trying and failing to reform Rumplestiltskin, but Belle defiantly shouts that she will never stop fighting for him.

=== In Storybrooke ===
Mr. Gold abducts William Smee (Chris Gauthier) and takes him to the edge of Storybrooke. There, he uses a potion on Smee's hat, knitted for him by his grandmother, and then pushes him across the town line. Smee retains his memory. Pleased, Gold releases him. Gold tells Belle of his success; if he uses the potion on his most treasured object and keeps the object with him, he can cross the border of Storybrooke without losing his identity or his knowledge of his quest to find his son, Baelfire. For the talisman, he will use a shawl that belonged to Baelfire. They agree that they would both like for Belle to accompany him, but there is only enough of the potion to enchant one object.

A funeral is held for Dr. Archie Hopper (Raphael Sbarge). Mary Margaret (Ginnifer Goodwin) eulogizes him, saying they will always think of him when they listen to their consciences. Hopper, actually alive and held prisoner by Captain Hook (Colin O'Donoghue), is interrogated by his captor. Hook is aggravated that Hopper knows nothing about the Dark One's dagger; he threatens Hopper with dissection and demands to know of Rumplestiltskin's other weaknesses. Hopper's response is not shown, but Hook soon attacks Belle at the library. She recognizes him from the Evil Queen's palace and, by pushing a bookshelf onto him, is able to hold him off long enough to seal herself securely inside the freight elevator. She calls Gold and he comes to rescue her. There is no sign of Hook.

Leroy, speaking for the Seven Dwarves, asks when they will return to the Enchanted Forest. After Archie's death, they no longer feel safe, and despite their enjoyment of Storybrooke's modern conveniences, many of the townspeople are concerned that, with the end of the curse, anybody from the world beyond Storybrooke could enter town, learn of magic, and endanger them. They are also homesick.

Gold and Belle head back to Gold's shop. Along the way, he reveals that Hook took his wife Milah from him, and that's why he took Hook's hand. He also reveals only that Milah died, but not how. They then find that the shop has been ransacked and the shawl stolen. Smee has taken it and gives it to Hook, because Hook wants to keep Gold trapped in Storybrooke. Gold plans to retrieve the shawl; blaming herself, Belle wants to help, but Gold insists that she instead lock herself safely in the library. He will not compel her magically; he trusts her to do as he asks and gives her a gun. Gold confronts Smee, who has packed a bag to leave town. Smee admits that he gave the shawl to Hook, and does not know where he is. Gold calls him a rat and turns him into one.

In the library, Belle finds a piece of rope that Hook dropped; she quickly researches it, identifies it as nautical rigging, and realizes that Hook's ship is in Storybrooke. She goes to the dock and, keenly observing her surroundings, locates and boards the invisible ship. She finds Archie in the hold and frees him, sending him to bring Gold. She stays to search for the shawl, but finds only a treasure in coins before Hook returns and catches her. He quickly disarms her and turns the gun on her. He informs her that Milah left Rumplestiltskin for his cowardice and that he loved Milah; he cannot bring himself to destroy the shawl, because she made it. He also tells her that Rumplestiltskin killed Milah by taking and crushing her heart, but Belle declares that she still believes there is good in Rumplestiltskin. She knocks Hook over with a wooden beam and flees with the shawl, but his knowledge of the ship enables him to intercept her on the deck before she can escape. Gold then arrives and begins to savagely beat Hook with his cane. Belle begs Gold to take the shawl and leave with her, while Hook dares him to take his heart. Belle tells Gold that Hook only wants to destroy the good in him; he listens to her, and they leave together after Gold tells Hook he never wants to see him again.

Meanwhile, Henry (Jared S. Gilmore) has been despondent over Archie's death, even calling the doctor's office to hear his voice on the answering machine. Emma Swan (Jennifer Morrison) then brings Archie's dog, Pongo, to Mary Margaret's apartment; Marco (Tony Amendola) felt Henry should have him. Mary Margaret is concerned the loft will be cramped, and she suggests she and David (Josh Dallas) find a new home of their own. But while Mary Margaret is content to establish a new life together in Storybrooke, David feels they need to liberate the Enchanted Forest from the ogres and from Cora; they realize that they may now want different things. Henry draws up plans to remodel the loft if his grandparents move out, and he wants to add an armory to protect them from Regina; Emma promises to keep him safe from her. Archie arrives and explains that he was kidnapped by Cora. Emma realizes that they were wrong about Regina, and she worries that there will be consequences for misjudging her.

At the town line, Gold uses his potion on the shawl and steps outside of Storybrooke, retaining his memories. Belle promises to wait for his return, but then Hook appears and shoots her, causing her to fall beyond the town line. Having forever lost all memories of being Belle, she shouts at Gold, who laments that the erasure of Belle's identity cannot be undone. He prepares to assault Hook with a fireball, which he seems to welcome. Just then, a car horn sounds, and Gold dives out of the way with Belle. The car knocks over Hook, who collapses on the road. Gold stares at the car which has a Pennsylvania license plate.

== Production ==
"The Outsider" was co-written by producers Andrew Chambliss and Ian Goldberg, while Las Vegas veteran David Solomon directed the episode.

== Reception ==
=== Ratings ===
The episode took a major hit from a combination of factors (both the Golden Globe Awards and a delayed 60 Minutes due to the AFC playoffs running overtime into the 8PM Eastern time zone), resulting in its lowest numbers by far, placing 2.8/7 among 18-49s with only 8.15 million viewers tuning in.

=== Reviews ===
Entertainment Weekly critic Sarah Caldwell gave it a good but mixed review: "'I think we can all agree that this was a pretty stupendous episode -- and I’m not just talking about Belle’s wardrobe."

Oliver Sava of The A.V. Club gave it a B: "Once Upon A Time is a problematic series, but it’s not unfixable. The last two episodes back from winter hiatus have made big strides toward improving this show, largely by focusing on character development rather than mythology. While it’s fun to see how these Disney fairy tales intersect in the past, the fantasy elements can feel empty without a strong emotional core. “The Outsider” does a good job balancing those different aspects of the series, spotlighting Belle as she fights to help Rumpelstiltskin realize the good inside himself while teaming up with Mulan in the past to hunt a giant flaming dog. It’s a little silly but that’s the Once Upon A Time M.O., and ultimately the episode is a strong story about fighting for what you really believe in, even if that ends up getting you a bullet in the back."
