= Ruby Slippers (Once Upon a Time) =

- Once Upon a Time episode
- Episode no.: Season 5 Episode 18
- Directed by: Eriq La Salle
- Written by: Andrew Chambliss & Bill Wolkoff
- Production code: 518
- Original air date: April 17, 2016

Guest appearances
- Emma Caulfield as the Blind Witch; Jamie Chung as Mulan; Greg Germann as Hades; Meghan Ory as Red Riding Hood/Ruby Lucas; Teri Reeves as Dorothy Gale; Victoria Smurfit as Cruella De Vil/Cruella Feinberg

Episode chronology
← Previous "Her Handsome Hero"	Next → "Sisters"
- Once Upon a Time season 5

"Ruby Slippers" is the eighteenth episode of the fifth season of the American fantasy drama series Once Upon a Time, which aired on April 17, 2016.

In this episode, Ruby goes to the Underworld to find Zelena. In flashbacks, Ruby, Mulan, and Dorothy meet.

== Plot ==
=== Opening sequence ===
Red walks around the red-tinted forest.

=== Event chronology ===
The Oz events take place years after the flashback scenes from "Our Decay", they also take place immediately after Zelena is banished to Oz in "Swan Song" and before she goes back to Storybrooke in the present day scenes in "Our Decay". The Oz present events take place not long after Zelena leaves. The Underworld events take place after "Her Handsome Hero"

=== In the Characters' Past ===
In Oz, "some time ago," Ruby and Mulan encounter Dorothy Gale's dog Toto in the woods while searching for Ruby's pack. Dorothy believes the growling Toto has identified Ruby as a witch, but Ruby explains her wolf heritage. Toto runs off, and Red insists on helping Dorothy track the dog, after Dorothy initially goes the wrong way. The three come upon Zelena, who demands the silver slippers from Dorothy as ransom for Toto, whom she has found. That night, Mulan, Ruby, and Dorothy brew a potion to use against Zelena.

Ruby and Dorothy go to collect the last ingredient, a poppy. Dorothy explains that Toto was a final gift from her beloved Auntie Em, who died shortly after interceding to prevent Dorothy's family from having her committed due to her stories of Oz. Ruby reveals that she was expelled by her village after accidentally killing her boyfriend, Peter. She also shares that she still feels she is searching for something, but she no longer knows what.

They collect the poppy but then are attacked by winged monkeys. Dorothy confirms that she trusts Ruby, so Ruby takes on her wolf form and carries Dorothy to safety. After they return to Mulan, a seemingly disconcerted Dorothy goes off alone. Ruby tells Mulan that she thinks Dorothy is what she has been looking for, but she is afraid Dorothy is disgusted by her wolf identity; Mulan reveals that she regrets not having told someone how she felt, and urges Ruby not to make the same mistake, as Dorothy might return her feelings. But Ruby discovers Dorothy has fled. At the Emerald Palace, Dorothy confronts Zelena, who pricks her with a sleeping curse.

=== In the Underworld ===
Ruby is surprised to find herself in the Underworld, as she had been pursuing Zelena via a tracking spell; Ruby believes the wolf in her has destroyed another life: Dorothy's, and she wants to make it right. Emma explains that Zelena is in the Underworld, and suggests they confront her. Hades informs Zelena of Ruby's presence, and Zelena decides to use the silver slippers to leave in order to avoid further damning herself in Regina's eyes. But Regina and the others arrive before she can leave. Zelena reveals that she put Dorothy under a sleeping curse, and that it can't be broken as Dorothy has no loved ones to provide a "true love's kiss." At Regina's urging, Zelena hands over the silver slippers. Ruby realizes that Dorothy's late Auntie Em might be in the Underworld, and they find her at a diner she runs. She agrees to blow a kiss into a bottle for Ruby to bring to Dorothy, but Hades appears and turns Em into a liquid, by contaminating her soup with liquid from the River of Lost Souls, and bottles her up. He declares the Storybrooke visitors anathema, and that anyone who works with them would be under penalty of the same punishment. Ruby is distraught, and Snow asks her if she loves Dorothy; Ruby admits it, but is afraid to try to give Dorothy true love's kiss, as she doesn't know if Dorothy ever reciprocated her feelings. Snow convinces her to try. Zelena goes to Hades' lair, where he pours Em into the River of Lost Souls, and explains that he has done this only because Dorothy is Zelena's enemy. She agrees to try to accept him into her life, and they share a drink.

Belle visits Zelena and asks for her help, "as a mother." Zelena hears her out, and Belle becomes even more worried after remembering that Zelena's pregnancy was magically accelerated. Belle later goes to Gold, revealing that Zelena has given her the pin with the sleeping curse. Belle believes the curse will put her beyond Hades' reach until the contract can be destroyed; she tells Gold to bring her to her father to break the curse, and then pricks herself.

Meanwhile, David discovers that Cruella is having the phone booth removed by Claude (who was a guard for Regina that Hook killed in the season 2 "Queen of Hearts" episode) on Hades' orders; she offers to let them use it if Henry will write her back to life, but he refuses. David and Snow become so distraught, Emma insists that one of them must return to Storybrooke to be with their son, Neal; they assume it must be David, but Killian uses the enchantment Hades put on his hook to replace Snow's name with David's on the tombstone, allowing her to leave. Using the slippers, Ruby and Snow depart for Oz.

Henry writes story pages showing that Dorothy was successfully revived, and that Snow is with Neal in Storybrooke.

=== In Oz ===
Ruby and Snow arrive in Oz to discover Mulan and the Munchkins standing vigil over the sleeping Dorothy. Ruby kisses Dorothy, breaking the curse. Dorothy explains that she left Ruby to protect her; having discovered her own feelings for Ruby, she feared Zelena would harm Ruby. They continue to kiss.

== Production ==
According to David Anders, the episode In the Name of the Brother was intended to seed a romance between Ruby and his character, Dr. Whale, who were seen arm in arm at the end of the episode. According to Anders these plans were shelved due to Ory being cast in the short-lived series, Intelligence. After the aforementioned show's cancellation Anders himself was cast in the series iZombie, leading to Ruby's pairing with Dorothy Gale in the episode this episode. Due to Ory being cast in Chesapeake Shores, it was her final appearance in the series.

The hints of having an LGBTQ character in the series had been teased by the producers for a while. "True love's kiss has been a staple of this show since the beginning," executive producers Adam Horowitz and Edward Kitsis say. "This past Sunday's episode was just another example of how in a fairy tale, as in life, love is love."

The Oz scenes were shot at Everett Crowley Park in Vancouver, British Columbia.

== Reception ==
Nick Roman of Ricky.Org said: "Once Upon a Time has dealt with LGBT romance before, but never with as much depth as we get here with “Ruby Slippers”. While you could make the argument that the show should be focusing more on the Hades story at this late stage of the season rather than a one-off story about Ruby's romance with Dorothy. But I think this episode illustrates why not every one-off story has to feel like filler.

It received praise from Entertainment Weekly's Andrea Towers: "Hello, happy endings! I know Once has teased the appearance of an LGBT relationship throughout the series, especially with Mulan and Aurora. But I'll give them kudos for how they handled tonight's reveal of Ruby and Dorothy's feelings and subsequent kiss. It was respectfully handled, emotional, and well done."

Christine Orlando of TV Fanatic gave the episode a 4.3 rating.

Gwen Inhat of The AV Club gave the episode a B.
