= Skin Deep (Once Upon a Time) =

- Once Upon a Time episode
- Episode no.: Season 1 Episode 12
- Directed by: Milan Cheylov
- Written by: Jane Espenson
- Original air date: February 12, 2012

Guest appearances
- Emilie de Ravin as Belle/Patient; Tim Phillipps as Sean Herman; Jessy Schram as Ashley Boyd; Beverly Elliott as Granny; Eric Keenleyside as Sir Maurice/Moe French; Meghan Ory as Ruby

Episode chronology
← Previous "Fruit of the Poisonous Tree"	Next → "What Happened to Frederick"
- Once Upon a Time season 1

"Skin Deep" is the twelfth episode of the American fairy tale/drama television series Once Upon a Time. The series takes place in the fictional seaside town of Storybrooke, Maine, in which the residents are actually characters from various fairy tales that were transported to the "real world" town by a powerful curse.

In this episode, Emma Swan (Jennifer Morrison) suspects Mr Gold (Robert Carlyle) of planning to seek vigilante justice after his home is burgled by the flower-seller Moe French (Eric Keenleyside). Meanwhile, Mary Margaret (Ginnifer Goodwin) plans a special girls' night out on Valentine's Day with Ruby (Meghan Ory) and Ashley (Jessy Schram).

In the flashbacks to the Enchanted Forest, a fateful deal is made between Rumpelstiltskin (Carlyle) and Belle (Emilie de Ravin), in which she gives up her freedom to save her village from the horrors of the Ogre Wars.

The episode was written by consulting producer Jane Espenson and directed by Milan Cheylov. It featured the first appearance of de Ravin, who was cast as Belle in November 2011 after being approached by series co-creators Edward Kitsis and Adam Horowitz. Espenson created a love-themed episode; initially its main theme was to be Rumpelstiltskin choosing power over love, but during the writing process Espenson decided instead to make the character believe that he was not worthy of love at all.

"Skin Deep" first aired in the United States on ABC on February 12, 2012 with it adapted into a novel released in 2013.

== Title card ==
A spinning wheel stands in the Enchanted Forest.

== Plot ==
=== In the characters' past ===
In the Enchanted Forest, the Ogre Wars are not going well for the lands controlled by Sir Maurice (Eric Keenleyside). Rumpelstiltskin (Robert Carlyle) is summoned and agrees to aid the battle in exchange for Maurice's daughter, Belle (Emilie de Ravin) to live at his estate as his caretaker. Belle's fiancée, Gaston (Sage Brocklebank), and her father reject the terms, but Belle goes against both their wishes and accepts the deal.

At his castle, Rumpelstiltskin gives Belle a list of tasks, including "skinning the children he hunts for their pelts." At this, Belle drops a teacup in shock, but he explains that it is a joke and is dismissive instead of angry about the now-chipped cup. As time goes by, Rumpelstiltskin and Belle develop a bond. After a few months of living with him, Belle asks the Dark One about some children's clothing she found in one of the castle's many rooms. Rumpelstiltskin says it belonged to his son whom he lost along with his wife.

Later, Gaston arrives to fight Rumpelstiltskin to get Belle back, but Rumpelstiltskin transfigures him into a rose, which he gifts to Belle. When Rumpelstiltskin later asks about her relationship with Gaston, Belle says that it was an arranged marriage, not one of love. She adds that she left her home to live with him because she wanted to be heroic by saving her village, as there are not many opportunities for women back in her village. At this, Rumpelstiltskin carefully asks Belle to go into town to buy straw for his spinning. When she expresses disbelief that he trusts her to come back, Rumpelstiltskin (uncharacteristically somber) says that he does not expect to see her again.

As Belle walks down the road towards her village, she encounters the Evil Queen (Lana Parrilla), who asks her if she is running from someone. Belle admits the man she is leaving is consumed by evil, yet she still loves him. The Evil Queen offers the solution: true love's kiss will break the curse. Belle returns to Rumpelstiltskin's castle, where the Dark One initially feigns nonchalance but then asks why she came back to him. She replies that she wasn't going to return, but something changed her mind. After a moment of silence between the two, they share a true love's kiss. The magic starts to turn him back into an ordinary man (shown through a change in the pallor of his skin), but he becomes furious and breaks off the kiss, accusing Belle of conspiring with the Evil Queen to rob him of his powers. Rumpelstiltskin rages that no one will ever love him, and the Evil Queen will never be able to take away his power. He throws Belle in his dungeon and begins destroying all of his breakable possessions, but even in his anger, he cannot bring himself to destroy the chipped teacup.

Finally, he orders Belle to leave his castle, claiming that his magic is more important to him than she is. Belle refuses to believe this and admonishes him for being too cowardly to believe that she can love him. She warns him that he will regret his actions, and all he'll have is an empty heart - and a chipped cup.

A month later, the Evil Queen pays a visit to the Dark Castle. Rumpelstiltskin informs her that her deception with Belle failed, and that the Evil Queen will never be more powerful than him. The Evil Queen counters that she had nothing to do with Belle's actions (although she prodded her into trying true love's kiss, Belle's feelings for him were genuine). She then lies to him that upon Belle's return home, she was shunned by her village for her association with Rumpelstiltskin and Gaston's disappearance (which is Rumpelstiltskin's fault). According to the Evil Queen, Belle was subsequently imprisoned and tortured by her father, leading her to commit suicide by jumping from her tower prison. Rumpelstiltskin is devastated, and the loss leads him to remove a treasured gold chalice from its display pedestal, replacing it with the chipped cup. He mourns his loss upon the Evil Queen's departure.

=== In Storybrooke ===
In the present day, Mr. Gold (Carlyle) repossesses florist Moe French's (Keenleyside) van the day before Valentine's Day. At Granny's, David (Josh Dallas) and Mary Margaret (Ginnifer Goodwin) talk from separate tables, until Emma Swan (Jennifer Morrison) interrupts to ask after her son Henry (Jared S. Gilmore). Ashley (Jessy Schram) arrives with her baby, noting how rarely she gets a babysitter or sees her boyfriend, Sean (Tim Phillipps). Ruby (Meghan Ory) suggests a girl's night out.

Emma investigates a robbery at Mr. Gold's mansion. Gold claims to know that Moe is responsible. Following this lead, Emma recovers the majority of Mr. Gold's items, but one unspecified item is missing and Gold will stop at nothing until it is recovered. When Emma takes too long for his taste, Gold takes matters into his own hands. He kidnaps Moe, ties him up in an abandoned shack on the edge of town, and beats him up, demanding where the missing object is and who told the florist to take it. However, his rant about the theft soon devolves into simply "she's gone" (referring to Belle, whose "suicide" Gold blames Moe for), until Emma arrives to stop him. Mr. Gold believes Regina (Lana Parrilla) put Moe up to the theft, and that she knows where the last stolen item is. Emma has to arrest Mr. Gold for assault.

In a Storybrooke bar, at their girls' night out, Ruby is trying to convince Ashley to find another guy since Sean is always working. Ashley tells Mary Margaret that all she wants is to be with Sean. Mary Margaret understands, since her own romantic arrangement is not ideal. Sean shows up, on a break between work shifts, and proposes to Ashley; she eagerly accepts and they go out for a drive together. David shows up next to give Mary Margaret her Valentine's Day card, but mistakenly gives her Kathryn's. Mary Margaret says she thought if two people were meant to be together they would find a way, but maybe she and David need another way. She tells him he should probably go home.

At the sheriff's office, Mr. Gold reminds Emma about the favor she owes him, but unexpectedly does not use it to request his freedom. Regina shows up and tells Emma that she can see Henry for 30 minutes if Emma will allow her to pay a private visit to Mr. Gold during that time. Once alone, Gold asks Regina if she has what he wants and she claims she does. Regina put Moe up to the robbery in order to find out if Mr. Gold retains his Enchanted Forest memories. After some prodding, he admits that his true name is Rumpelstiltskin and addresses Regina as "Your Majesty," confirming that both are aware of their former fairy-tale identities. Regina returns the chipped cup to Mr. Gold as part, then makes a visit to the hospital. We see an unmarked cell in the underground psychiatric ward that holds Belle, who did not commit suicide in the Enchanted Forest as the Evil Queen claimed, but is in fact being held prisoner by Regina in the hospital's mental ward.

== Production ==
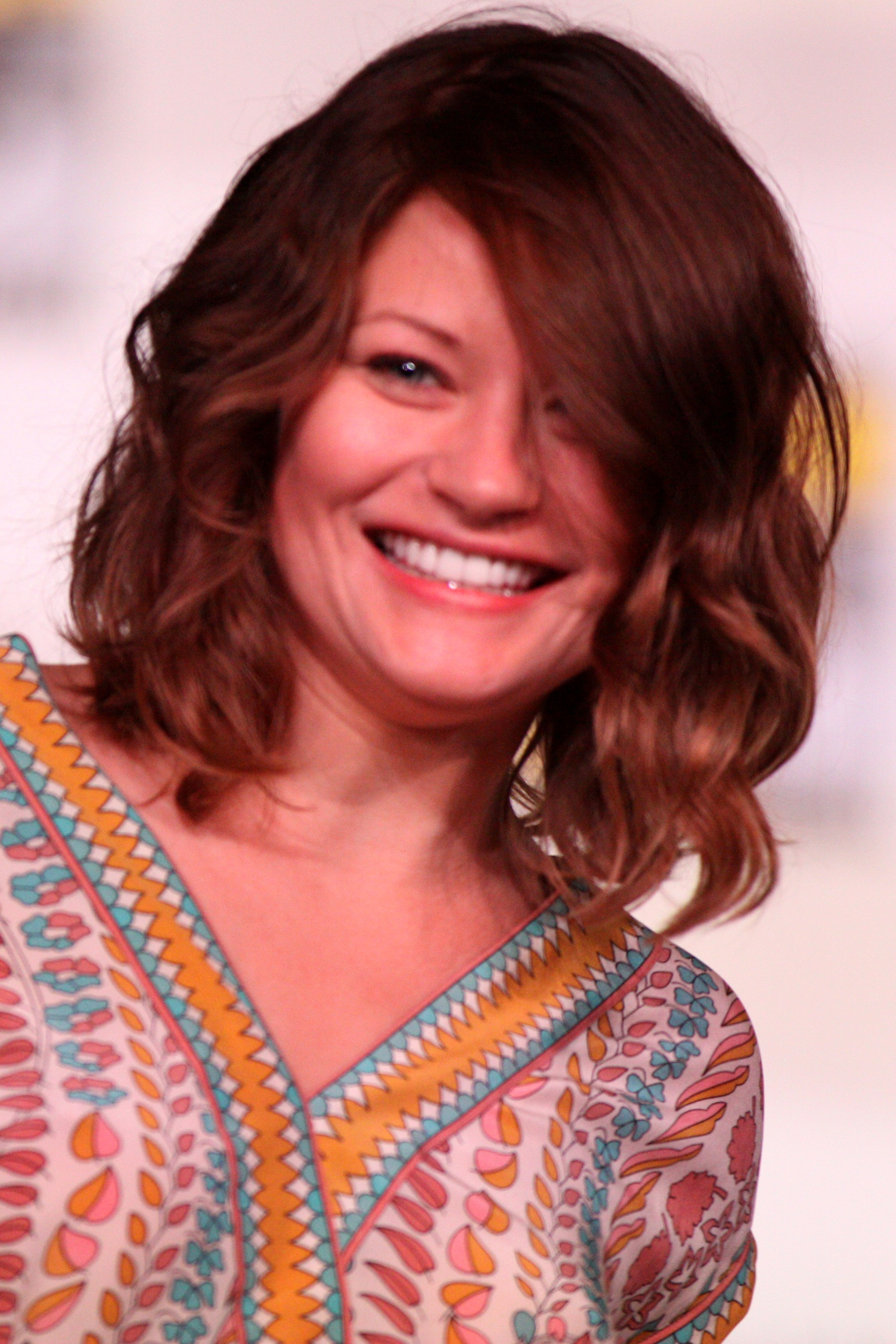
Emilie de Ravin, who portrayed Belle, described her character as someone who would "do anything basically for her father, but also her friends and family in general, and that's what she does. She has this chance where she's always wanted to be brave and make a change and do something different and not just sit around in the confinement of her castle and her simple life."

"Skin Deep" was written by consulting producer Jane Espenson, while 24 veteran, Milan Cheylov, directed the installment. Knowing that they were going to recreate the story of "Beauty and the Beast", series co-creators Edward Kitsis and Adam Horowitz wanted its heroine, Belle, "to exude intelligence and strength and be someone you would immediately love," which led them to approach Emilie de Ravin. Her casting was announced in November 2011. The actress agreed after reading the script, believing that the character was "very courageous" with a playful side that would endear her to Rumpelstiltskin. During their casting meeting, Kitsis and Horowitz told de Ravin that Belle is defined as a strong intelligent woman in a world that disapproves of those characteristics, and that de Ravin was going to be "tak[ing] the icon of Belle and mak[ing] her a woman."

Espenson said that this was one of their most love-centered episodes; when they realized it was going to be airing near Valentine's Day, they decided to "lean into" this theme. Unusually for Once Upon a Time, the theme of this episode changed during the writing process. It was initially meant to center on Rumpelstiltskin choosing power over love. However, as Espenson went through drafts and discussed them with others, she decided that Rumpelstiltskin might think he is choosing power over love, but in reality his actions are motivated by a belief that he is not worthy of love at all. In the interest of time, Espenson was forced to edit out many plot points, including a failed escape attempt by Belle. Despite this, she sought to trim down more time from the Storybrooke scenes and "preserve as much as we could of the fairy tale side," as the Belle-Rumpelstiltskin relationship was a love story that needed time to grow in order to be believable.

De Ravin was a fan of the series before being cast and was happy to be able to view the costumes up close, describing her character's gold dress as "absolutely stunning." The casting of her former suitor, Gaston, was announced in December 2011 with Psych actor Sage Brocklebank. De Ravin described the episode's version of Gaston as "maybe not as cocky as the animation [version of him], but it's funny." Rumpelstiltskin's castle was shot almost entirely on greenscreen, with only a few real props being used. It was de Ravin's first time working with this technology, which caused her to become "quite nervous." The physical props helped her with the scenes, and "they ha[d] a fantastic set up of a couple of monitors that you can see a markup of basically how it's going to look."

The episode was included in Reawakened: A Once Upon a Time Tale – a novelization of the first season – which was published by Hyperion Books in 2013.

== Cultural references ==
There are multiple references made to Disney's Beauty and the Beast. The chipped tea cup that Belle accidentally drops is a reference to the boy-transformed-teacup Chip from the animated film. Also, Rumplestiltskin was referred to as a "beast" by Belle's father. Belle's fiancée in the show is named Gaston, the Disney antagonist, and he was turned into a red rose, which featured prominently in the film. In addition, most of Belle's clothing in the fantasy world appears to be directly inspired by the Disney film, such as her classic yellow ballgown and her blue-and-white plainclothes.

Mr. French's flower shop is called "Game of Thorns," a reference to Game of Thrones, a popular fantasy show and book series. The name and a logo can be seen on the side of his van at the start of the episode. David is seen reading Anna Karenina, another story about an affair that ends tragically. In the end of the episode, a reference to One Flew Over the Cuckoo's Nest is shown, when Regina meets a nurse, who looks like Nurse Ratched and the janitor mopping the floor, a striking resemblance to the Chief in the novel and film adaptation.

== Reception ==
=== Ratings ===
Ratings and viewership for "Skin Deep" were down from the last episode. It had an 18-49 rating of 3.0 and was seen by 8.65 million viewers, down 14 percent, but still came in second overall for the night. This was partially due to the fact that the episode aired in the same time-slot as the 54th Grammy Awards, who had their best numbers ever since the 1984 telecast and the sudden news of Whitney Houston's death the day prior to the event. In Canada, the episode finished in sixteenth place for the week with an estimated 1.55 million viewers, a slight decrease from the 1.58 million of the previous episode.

=== Reviews ===
"Skin Deep" received mixed reviews from television critics.

Amy Ratcliffe, writing for IGN, rated the episode with an 8 out of 10. She expressed her love of Robert Carlyle, opining that "I especially liked him in the episode. He managed to show true emotion in spite of his silly Rumpelstiltskin accent, and he improves every scene he's in. I feel like this episode will start something bigger. At least, I hope it will." Laura Prudom of The Huffington Post felt Espenson was a "perfect fit for this episode – when she's firing on all cylinders, the Buffy alumna is one of the best in the industry at writing layered, empowered women, even when circumstances conspire against them."

Hillary Busis of Entertainment Weekly opined that Espenson's attempt to tell a "nightmarish, twisty tale of obsession and loss" was "decidedly mixed" due to the lack of development in the relationship between Belle and Rumpelstiltskin. Busis explained, "Yes, people fall in love quickly in traditional bedtime stories. But at least in the animated version of Beauty and the Beast, we could understand why Belle and her hairy paramour were meant to be. 'Skin Deep' didn't bother to explain that attraction." In a contribution for Tor.com, Teresa Jusino defined "Skin Deep" as an "amazing retelling of the Beauty and the Beast story that contained some wonderful character moments and some great one-liners... Funny, charming, and at times harrowing, the script takes us into the depths of Rumpelstiltskin's soul, showing us this character both at his most warm and at his most dark." Jusino was critical of the subplot with David and Mary Margaret, however, saying that "it didn't seem necessary as it didn't really move much forward."

== Cast ==
=== Starring ===
- Ginnifer Goodwin as Mary Margaret Blanchard
- Jennifer Morrison as Emma Swan
- Lana Parrilla as Evil Queen/Regina Mills
- Josh Dallas as David Nolan
- Jared S. Gilmore as Henry Mills
- Raphael Sbarge (credit only)
- Robert Carlyle as Rumplestiltskin/Mr. Gold/Beast

=== Guest Starring ===
- Emilie de Ravin as Belle/Patient
- Tim Phillipps as Sean Herman
- Jessy Schram as Ashley Boyd
- Beverley Elliott as Granny
- Eric Keenleyside as Sir Maurice/Moe French
- Meghan Ory as Ruby

=== Co-Starring ===
- Sage Brocklebank as Gaston
- John DeSantis as The Dove
- Gabe Khouth as Mr. Clark
- Chris Shields as Military Advisor
- Ingrid Torrance as Severe Nurse

=== Uncredited ===
- Jarod Joseph as Billy
- Peter Marcin as Chief
- Unknown baby as Alexandra
