= Her Handsome Hero =

- Once Upon a Time episode
- Episode no.: Season 5 Episode 17
- Directed by: Romeo Tirone
- Written by: Jerome Schwartz
- Production code: 517
- Original air date: April 10, 2016

Guest appearances
- Wes Brown as Gaston; Greg Germann as Hades; Eric Keenleyside as Maurice/Moe French; Meghan Ory as Red Riding Hood/Ruby Lucas

Episode chronology
← Previous "Our Decay"	Next → "Ruby Slippers"
- Once Upon a Time season 5

"Her Handsome Hero" is the seventeenth episode of the fifth season of the American fantasy drama series Once Upon a Time, which aired on April 10, 2016.

In this episode, Belle and Rumple are reunited with Gaston who is trying to get revenge on Rumple for killing him; Emma has a nightmare that she thinks is coming real. In flashbacks, Belle meets Gaston for the first time.

== Plot ==
=== Opening sequence ===
An ogre runs through the red-tinted forest.

=== Event chronology ===
The Enchanted Forest events take place before "Family Business". The Underworld events take place after "Our Decay".

=== In the Characters' Past ===
In the Enchanted Forest, Belle's father Maurice wants to arrange a meeting between Belle and Gaston. As the two take a stroll in the woods they are interrupted by a noise and Gaston senses that it came from a large animal. They find a young ogre in a pit trap and Gaston vows that he will bring the creature back to her father. However, Belle believes the ogre does not mean any harm and wants to find another way so that does not involve killing it. Gaston agrees to go along with her idea. At her father's library, the two search for books before finding "An Alphabetic Inventory of Magical Antiquities", which lists all of the magical items in the kingdom. Belle finds details on a mirror which reveal the evil in a person's soul. She wishes to use the mirror on the ogre to see if he means the kingdom any harm. Belle also shows Gaston a book titled "Her Handsome Hero" which she says defines how a hero is supposed to act, with compassion. They nearly kiss, but Belle turns him down. Belle leaves to fetch the mirror and Gaston agrees to watch over the ogre.

Later, Belle tells her father about trapped ogre. When they arrive at the pit, Gaston is injured and claims the ogre had escaped and waited to attack him. Gaston suddenly sees the ogre and shoots at the creature with an arrow from the tree. Gaston is ready to kill the ogre but Belle argues with him, believing there is a misunderstanding. During the argument Gaston breaks the mirror. When Belle sees the broken glass she notices Gaston's eyes glowing red. That, combined with several fresh wounds on the ogre, reveals that Gaston had tortured the ogre in order to provoke the creature so they would have reason to kill it. Belle lets the ogre escape.

Back at the castle, Maurice reveals that the ogres are now advancing on their kingdom and believes Belle's actions are to blame. He says that they cannot defend against the ogre army on their own and they need the help of Gaston's kingdom and that Belle will have to marry Gaston to obtain their help. Gaston arrives and proposes to Belle, and she reluctantly agrees, as she believes it is the only way to save the kingdom.

=== In the Underworld ===
Emma wakes up from a nightmare. In the dream, Hook, Snow White and herself are in the Underworld Graveyard attempting to use Emma's light magic to erase their names from the tombstones Hades had created. Hook senses something is wrong and a tornado appears. The three seek shelter behind a large crypt and Hook senses there is a large creature nearby. Snow attempts to face the creature and is taken away and presumably killed which wakes Emma. Emma tells Hook about the dream wondering if they are visions of the future. In the library, Regina has spent all night preparing a spell to break Hades' protection spell on the elevator by drawing runes all over the elevator door. Emma and Regina use their magic to open the door as they break the code and the door opens revealing a brick wall, their efforts proving futile. Emma outlines some of the details of the dream believing that she can erase their names from the tombstones to allow everyone to leave the Underworld. Hades is standing there to see Zelena when he notices a daisy growing in the broken road. Regina decides to talk to Zelena, who knows more about Hades rather than the others. When Regina visits Zelena, she realizes that her and Hades are in love. Zelena tells her that she (Zelena) is Hades' only weakness. At the underworld cemetery, Emma attempts to cast the spell from her dream, but suddenly starts believing the nightmare is coming true when the same storm appears. She, Hook and Snow head to Regina's vault, where Hook, Snow, and even Regina tell Emma not to give up. Emma failed everyone but she saved Hook's life. Snow White tells Emma that love is worth it.

Meanwhile, Belle issues an ultimatum to Gold, saying that this time she should take charge of things herself in order to protect her child. Moments after Hades picked up the flower, which has suddenly started growing in the Underworld because the outsiders have bought hope, enlist Gaston, who was working at Storybrooke Pet Shelter. Hades wanted Gaston to take down everyone, starting with Gold, and handed Gaston a set of lethal arrows, which were forged in the River of Lost Souls (Acheron). When Gold and Belle attempt to look up a spell, they leave arguing over his use of Dark Magic, when they are met by an arrow fired by Gaston. Gold catches the next one, even as Belle tries to mediate. Gaston tells Belle that Gold (as Rumplestiltskin) was responsible for his death, as he aims another arrow, but just as he fires, Gold uses magic to relocate him and Belle to the docks. Belle is shocked to learn about how Gaston died, even as Gold was ready to use Dark Magic to defeat Gaston, but Belle refuses, believing that her goal to help Gaston move on would be solve the conflict and weaken Hades. While looking through Gaston's locker, Belle figured out that she was Gaston's unfinished business, when she finds a book called "Her Handsome Hero." After she asked Gold to leave, Belle is surprised by Hades, who showed up to offer her a deal: Let Gaston and Rumple fight to the death. If one of them threw the other into the River of Lost Souls, he would cancel the contract on Belle's baby.

When Gaston arrived to the Pawn Shop, he aims at what he thought was Gold but discovers a mannequin instead. He is then confronted by Belle, who now knows he was willing to kill Rumple and believed he still had feelings for her, only to learn that the book was punishment and a constant reminder of why he died. He was also shocked to discover Belle is now Gold's wife, and leaves furious. Belle tells Gold and makes him promise not to hurt Gaston. But when she tells Gold about what Hades told her he just couldn't accept what Belle wanted. At the docks, Gold uses magic to choke Gaston by the throat, ready to send him to the River of Lost Souls, when Belle pulls the dagger and commands him not to hurt Gaston, and he drops Gaston on the ground. However, Gaston is unable to let his vendetta against Gold go, and when he goes for his arrow, Belle accidentally knocks Gaston out into the River of Lost Souls. Unfortunately, Belle discovers that because she saved Gold but interfered, Hades arrives to tell the couple that the contract allowing him to take their baby was still in effect, as Belle was the one who knocked Gaston into the Acheron, not Gold. He then looks at a withering daisy flower that he picks up, as a sign of hope fading away. The burned flower later shows up at Granny's Diner, as a gift to Zelena from Hades.

Finally, Emma, Regina, Hook, and Snow chase down the beast in the woods that Emma believes it to be the same one from the dream, and uses her magic to stop it. When they reach the creature, they are shocked to find a wolf, only to learn from Snow as she put Ruby's cloak on a big bad wolf; it's actually Ruby, who has shown up in the Underworld, but unsure of whether or not she is still alive. Snow tells Emma that her dream was actually a vision pointing them to Ruby.

== Production ==
Sean Maguire is not featured in this episode.

== Trivia ==
- This episode title is a reference to Belle's mother Colette, who read a book titled Her Handsome Hero to her daughter Belle, first referenced in the fourth-season episode "Family Business."
- Belle reads An Alphabetized Inventory of Magicial Antiquities.
- Belle gave Her Handsome Hero to Gaston, telling him what to expect in the book: compassion & forgiveness. This hints at her later relationship with Rumplestiltskin.

== Reception ==
The episode was met with positive reviews.

Andrea Towers of Entertainment Weekly gave it a positive review: "It was a tale as old as time on tonight's Once Upon a Time as we revisited the tale of Belle and Gaston…because no one's quite like Gaston."

In a review from Rickey.org, Nick Roman said, "“Her Handsome Hero” keeps things interesting by blurring the lines between hero and villain, with Belle, Emma and even Zelena being faced with major questions about who they are, who they want to be, and how they can get out of their current situation. It's the type of episode Once Upon A Time does well, delivering a real ensemble story that keeps all the various elements of the plot moving forward. This was some pretty good television overall."

Christine Orlando of TV Fanatic gave the episode a 4.5 out of 5.

Amy Ratcliffe of IGN said of the episode, "Like Gaston pointed out, Belle has a knack for finding monsters. Flashbacks showed how her sweet nature has been a benefit and how it's caused problems for her. The trip backwards was so-so, but Germann's performance and Hades' machinations made the episode." Ratcliffe gave the episode a 7.0 rating out of 10.

Gwen Ihnat of The A.V. Club gave the episode a positive review, giving it a B overall. In her recap, she favored the Belle-centric storyline by giving it a B+: "The upside, though, is a strong episode for Belle; Gaston is downright dishy (although still evil); and a Belle plot means more Rumple time, always welcome." However, the other plotline garnered a C−: "The main plot fared even better compared to the dumb B-plot, with Emma, Hook and Snow Scooby-ing up the place, with an enchanted elevator, a dream sequence, and what looks to be a wild goose chase that results in the discovery of Red/Ruby. Don't get me wrong, I'm all for the culmination of the Ruby/Mulan relationship, but did we really need a whole episode just to discover the wolf?"

One review from "TV.com" gives this episode an 8.0 out of 10.
