= Dreamy (Once Upon a Time) =

- Once Upon a Time episode
- Episode no.: Season 1 Episode 14
- Directed by: David Solomon
- Written by: Edward Kitsis & Adam Horowitz
- Original air date: March 4, 2012

Guest appearances
- Amy Acker as Nova/Astrid; Lee Arenberg as Grumpy/Dreamy/Leroy; Emilie De Ravin as Belle; Giancarlo Esposito as Sidney Glass; Beverley Elliott as Granny; Geoff Gustafson as Stealthy; David-Paul Grove as Doc; Gabe Khouth as Mr. Clark/Sneezy; Faustino Di Bauda as Sleepy; Jeffrey Kaiser as Dopey; Michael Coleman as Happy; Mig Macario as Bashful; Ken Kramer as Bossy; Richard Ian Cox as Watchy; Meghan Ory as Ruby; Keegan Connor Tracy as The Blue Fairy/Mother Superior

Episode chronology
← Previous "What Happened to Frederick"	Next → "Red-Handed"
- Once Upon a Time season 1

"Dreamy" is the 14th episode of the American fairy tale/drama television series Once Upon a Time, which aired in the United States on ABC on March 4, 2012.

The series takes place in the fictional seaside town of Storybrooke, Maine, in which the residents are actually characters from various fairy tales that were transported to the "real world" town by a powerful curse. This episode centers on Leroy and his fairytale counterpart, "Dreamy", one of Snow White's seven dwarfs.

It was co-written by Adam Horowitz and Edward Kitsis, while being directed by David Solomon.

== Title card ==
The Seven Dwarfs walk through the Enchanted Forest.

== Plot ==
=== In the characters' past ===
In the Enchanted Forest, a clumsy fairy, Nova (Amy Acker), dreams of becoming a fairy godmother and escaping her day job: fairy dust carrier. When she begins her trip, a bit of dust falls onto the egg of a dwarf. As a result, the dwarf is born early, and seems different from his brothers. He is given a magic ax that names him Dreamy (Lee Arenberg). His seven brothers are Stealthy (Geoff Gustafson), Doc, Dopey, Happy, Sleepy, Sneezy, and Bashful. A year later, Nova is still collecting fairy dust made in the mines of the dwarves, when Dreamy recognizes her. He claims to have seen her in his dreams right before he hatched. After Nova accidentally places a bag of fairy dust on a conveyor leading to an incinerator, Dreamy saves it and becomes her "hero." Nova mentions that she is going to watch the fireflies hoping Dreamy will get that it is an invitation for him but he doesn't.

Even though he is told dwarves don't love (that's why they don't have any female dwarves), he is convinced by Belle (Emilie de Ravin) in a bar that he should meet with Nova. Dreamy really is in love, and Nova falls for him too. Together they make plans to run away and see the world, but this plan is thwarted when the Blue Fairy (Keegan Connor Tracy) shows up. She convinces Dreamy that the best thing for Nova would be if she didn't date Dreamy anymore. She explains that if Dreamy and Nova go off together, "it will not end well" and Nova will lose her wings. In the interest of saving Nova's dream and her wings, Dreamy is forced to leave her. He returns to the mine heartbroken, proclaiming, "Where's my ax?" Welcomed back by the Dwarves, but still distraught over having to end his relation with Nova, he strikes the rock in rage, breaking his ax. He is given a new one which renames him Grumpy, due to his rage from his breakup with Nova.

=== In Storybrooke ===
Storybrooke is celebrating the Miner's Festival and Mary Margaret (Ginnifer Goodwin) attempts to bank some good will by selling candles made by the nuns. She asks Leroy (Arenberg) to volunteer, but he retorts that she is the only person the town dislikes more than him. His attitude changes after Sister Astrid (Acker) spills glitter on him. When Astrid tells Leroy she accidentally spent all her stipend on helium, he vows to sell all her candles to make up the money the nuns need for rent. Mary Margaret realizes Leroy is in love with Astrid who, as a nun, is unavailable. Leroy reminds her she is no better and the two team up to start selling. Unfortunately, Leroy was quite right about how unpopular they are. Leroy is unable to tell Astrid that he let her down and comes up with a new plan. He offers to sell his boat to Mr. Gold (Robert Carlyle) in exchange for forgiving the nuns the rent. Gold declines when he learns it is for the nuns, whom he fiercely dislikes. Astrid finds out none of the candles were sold. Desperate and near defeat, Leroy and Mary Margaret share a drink at Granny's. Leroy has one last idea; he breaks the power transformer for the whole town, causing a blackout. This forces everyone to buy candles and the stock is sold out. Leroy is restored as Astrid's hero. While the word "TRAMP" is still visible on Mary Margaret's truck, the town, including Granny, seems to accept her again.

Meanwhile, Sheriff Emma Swan (Jennifer Morrison) investigates the disappearance of Kathryn Nolan and the first person she must question is her husband, David (Josh Dallas). David claims he did not speak to Kathryn the previous day and he presumed she had left for Boston as planned. Sidney Glass (Giancarlo Esposito), hoping to get a story and his position at the newspaper back, offers to help Emma. Regina (Lana Parrilla) receives a fax and calls Sidney to inform him she has the phone records. He brings Emma the records that show David did in fact speak to Kathryn the day she vanished. Emma has a hard time believing David lied but Sidney insists the evidence is irrefutable. The episode ends with Emma taking David to the sheriff's station to "tell her everything."

== Production ==
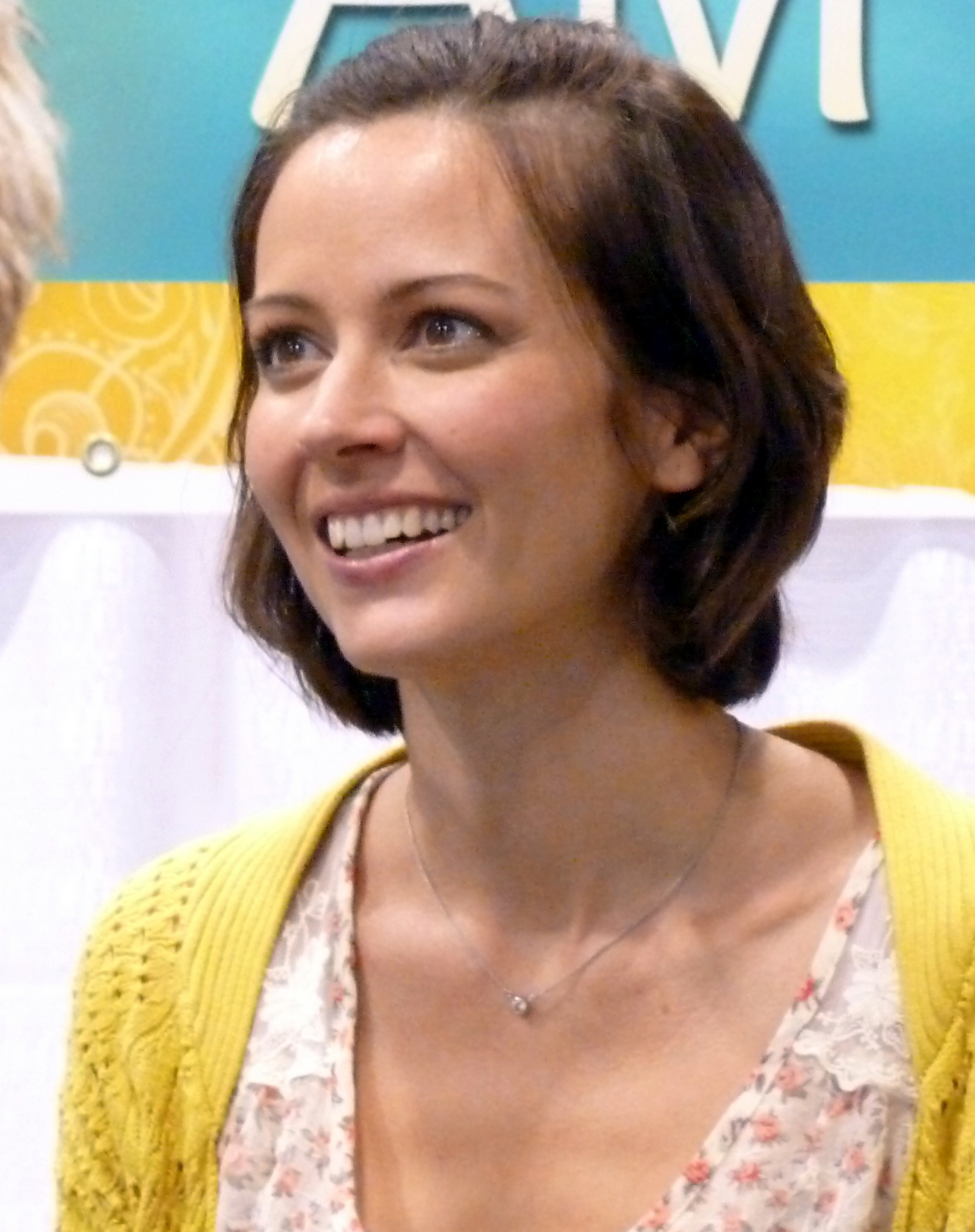
The episode featured guest star Amy Acker.

"Dreamy" was co-written by series co-creators Adam Horowitz and Edward Kitsis, while being directed by Dollhouse veteran, David Solomon.

Kitsis described the episode as being "in the vein of a Pixar [movie]." Horowitz and Kitsis later revealed that "we got a little bit of a chill because, to actually sit down and say this is how they got their names, was really cool for us as writers."

Amy Acker was cast in December 2011 as Grumpy's love interest. Kitsis "intended for Nova "to help tell the story of how Grumpy became Grumpy."

== Reception ==
=== Ratings ===
The episode first aired on March 4, 2012. The episode's ratings and viewership increased from the one that aired the previous week. It had an 18-49 rating of 3.4/9 and was watched by 10.67 million viewers. It was also first in its timeslot beating The Amazing Race on CBS, The Simpsons on Fox and a repeat of The Celebrity Apprentice on NBC.

In Canada, the episode finished in sixteenth place for the week with an estimated 1.44 million viewers, a slight decrease from the 1.497 million of the previous episode.

=== Reviews ===
The episode was met with mixed reviews.

Lily Sparks of TV.com gave the episode a negative review and wrote, "Okay, I'm about to hit you with some truth: last night's episode of 'Once Upon a Time,' 'Dreamy,' was the worst this show had ever been. The opening was a siege of nightmarish information, including the revelations that there are no dwarf women and the permanently old dwarf men reproduce asexually by hatching out of eggs FULLY CLOTHED. And the horrible romance! Grumpy and Nova the 'clumsy fairy' were seriously bizarre characters, they both talked like six year olds and now I feel like I've condescended to six year olds, because even six year olds aren't this simplistic and idiotic.

Hillary Busis of Entertainment Weekly complained, "I think the writers of 'Once' have seen Disney's version of Aida one too many times. On this show, every story's a love story ... 'Once' has dipped into the 'star-crossed lovers' well a few times too many."

Oliver Sava of The A.V. Club gave the episode a "B" and said, "'Once Upon A Time' has gone from exceedingly mediocre to downright serviceable in the second half of the season, but it remains a problematic series, struggling to balance its two different worlds. Last episode heightened the emotional stakes in Storybrooke to contrast with the swashbuckling fairyback, but 'Dreamy' goes back to the more obvious storytelling of the season’s early episodes, hammering its theme like a high-budget children’s show. That’s not necessarily a bad thing, and if this show wanted to be live-action Disney mash-up that would be fine, but unfortunately, it has this whole missing person/potential murder subplot that brings it into more mature territory."

== Cast ==
=== Starring ===
- Ginnifer Goodwin as Mary Margaret Blanchard
- Jennifer Morrison as Emma Swan
- Lana Parrilla as Regina Mills
- Josh Dallas as David Nolan
- Eion Bailey (credit only)
- Jared S. Gilmore (credit only)
- Raphael Sbarge (credit only)
- Robert Carlyle as Mr. Gold

=== Guest Starring ===
- Amy Acker as Nova/Astrid
- Lee Arenberg as Dreamy/Leroy
- Emilie de Ravin as Belle
- Giancarlo Esposito as Sidney Glass
- Beverley Elliott as Granny
- Geoff Gustafson as Stealthy
- Meghan Ory as Ruby
- Keegan Connor Tracy as Blue Fairy/Mother Superior

=== Co-Starring ===
- Paul Chevreau as Skinny Man
- Michael Coleman as Happy
- Richard Ian Cox as Watchy
- Faustino di Bauda as Sleepy/Walter
- David-Paul Grove as Doc
- Jeffrey Kaiser as Dopey
- Gabe Khouth as Sneezy/Mr. Clark
- Ken Kramer as Bossy
- Mig Macario as Bashful
- Elizabeth McCarthy as Wife/Rotund Wife
- Michael Rinaldi as Helper Dwarf

=== Uncredited ===
- Unknown as Floyd
