= The Cricket Game =

- Once Upon a Time episode
- Episode no.: Season 2 Episode 10
- Directed by: Dean White
- Written by: David H. Goodman; Robert Hull
- Original air date: January 6, 2013

Guest appearances
- Lee Arenberg as Grumpy/Leroy; Beverley Elliott as Granny; Barbara Hershey as Cora/The Queen of Hearts; Colin O'Donoghue as Captain Killian "Hook" Jones; Tony Perez as Henry; Raphael Sbarge as Jiminy Cricket/Dr. Archibald "Archie" Hopper; Keegan Connor Tracy as The Blue Fairy/Mother Superior

Episode chronology
← Previous "Queen of Hearts"	Next → "The Outsider"
- Once Upon a Time season 2

"The Cricket Game" is the tenth episode of the second season of the American ABC fantasy/drama television series Once Upon a Time, and the show's 32nd episode overall. It aired on January 6, 2013.

In this episode Cora frames Regina, while flashbacks show Snow and Charming trying to deal with the Evil Queen.

It was co-written by David H. Goodman and Robert Hull, while being directed by Dean White.

== Title card ==
Pongo the Dalmatian dog walks through the Enchanted Forest.

== Plot ==
=== In the Characters' Past ===
The Evil Queen/Regina (Lana Parrilla) surveys a scene of destruction and learns that King George and his army have been defeated by the forces of Snow White (Ginnifer Goodwin) and Prince Charming (Josh Dallas), and that Snow is now traveling to reunite with Charming. The Evil Queen orders her soldiers to keep them apart long enough for her to find Snow. Later, she confronts Snow in the forest, and rejects Snow's offer of parley, instead demanding Snow's death. It turns out to be a trap (though the offer of parley was genuine and Snow was prepared to accept the Queen's surrender); the Blue Fairy (Keegan Connor Tracy) launches an attack on the Queen and magically binds her.

Prince Charming declares that the only way to deal with the Evil Queen is to put her to death. Snow White recalls that the Queen was once kind and saved her life, but accedes to Charming's insistence that this is the only way to protect the kingdom. The Queen's father, Henry (Tony Perez), visits her in her cell, and blames himself for failing her as a father. He begs her to show remorse in hopes of saving her own life. When she is brought to the site of her execution where a concealed Rumplestiltskin (Robert Carlyle) is looking on from the crowd, she expresses regret only for failing to cause more destruction and especially for failing to kill Snow White. Even so, Snow halts the execution at the last moment. She tells Charming that the Queen was only trying to not appear weak as she died and insists that she can be rehabilitated. Rumplestiltskin later reveals himself to Snow and offers his services in testing the Queen to determine if she can truly change.

Snow White comes to the Evil Queen's cell and tells her she wants them to start fresh. She releases the Queen from the cell and encourages her to leave evil behind when she departs, however, the Queen attacks Snow instead. When Snow tries to defend herself with a dagger, the Queen takes it and stabs Snow. To the Queen's dismay, Snow remains unharmed. Charming emerges and reveals that one of her hairs, taken from the blindfold that was put on her at the execution, was used by Rumplestiltskin to create a protection spell that prevents her from harming Snow or Charming in this land. Snow points out that this was not a trap, but a test she truly hoped the Queen would pass. The Queen is banished forever to live alone with her misery.

On Snow White and Prince Charming's wedding day, Rumplestiltskin comes to the Evil Queen and tells her that the protection spell would lose its effect if they traveled to a different land. The Queen calls for a carriage to take her to the wedding.

=== In Storybrooke ===
Cora (Barbara Hershey) and Captain Hook (Colin O'Donoghue) moor Hook's ship in Storybrooke. Hook wants them to go their separate ways, but Cora points out that Storybrooke now has magic, and he will be unable to defeat Rumplestiltskin without her help. To hide their presence, Cora makes the ship invisible and turns a harbor worker who has spotted them into a fish.

Mary Margaret (Goodwin) and David (Dallas) enjoy their first physical intimacy they have enjoyed in 28 years, before being interrupted by Emma Swan (Jennifer Morrison) and Henry (Jared S. Gilmore). Later, they attend a “welcome home” party for Mary Margaret and Emma at Granny's (Beverley Elliott). At Emma's invitation, Regina also attends. Emma persuades Mary Margaret and David to accept Regina's presence, but Regina does not feel comfortable and leaves early. She and Emma fight about her desire to spend more time with Henry, but Regina ultimately apologizes and they are able to be civil. Emma mentions that Dr. Archie Hopper (Raphael Sbarge) reassured her about Regina's efforts to change. As Regina leaves, Cora and Hook observe her from a rooftop and Cora says that Regina is not yet broken.

The next day, Regina confronts Dr. Hopper about discussing her sessions with Emma, but he insists he did not breach physician–patient privilege and encourages her to still see him as a confidante. Ruby (Meghan Ory) observes their argument. That night, Regina comes to Dr. Hopper's office and asks if they can talk, but then she attacks him. Ruby sees her come and go, but only the audience learns that “Regina” is actually Cora in a magical guise.

The following day, as Henry leaves for school, Archie's dog, Pongo, comes up to Emma and barks repeatedly. Ruby determines that something is wrong, and she and Emma follow the dog back to Archie's office and find him dead on the floor. On the strength of what Ruby has witnessed, Regina is brought in for questioning and claims she had nothing to do with the murder. To Mary Margaret and David's surprise, Emma believes her and lets her go. The three of them search Dr. Hopper's office for clues and find that Regina's file is missing; Emma explains that the large amount of evidence is suspicious in and of itself and actually points towards a frame job. They realize that Mr. Gold (Carlyle) is the likeliest perpetrator, and they confront him. He denies any involvement, and uses a dreamcatcher to extract Pongo's memories. With Gold's encouragement, Emma then uses her own magic to display the dog's memory of Archie's murder, and they all witness Regina seemingly choking the therapist to death.

Emma is now ready to arrest Regina, but Mary Margaret and David point out that they need a plan. When they go to Regina's house and tell her what they have seen, she demands the opportunity to tell Henry her side of the story. At Emma's command, the Mother Superior appears with fairy dust refined by the dwarves, but Regina is able to deflect the attack and magically throw Emma to the ground. When Emma confronts Regina with the fact that Henry will never again believe her and that she will never change, she magically flees. As they wait for Henry's school bus, Emma, Mary Margaret, and David discuss the fact that they are all struggling to learn how to be parents to children they barely know and resolve to face their challenges together as a family. After the bus arrives, Emma takes Henry aside to tell him what has happened, while a weeping Regina looks on from a distance.

On Hook's ship, Cora reveals to Hook that Archie is now a prisoner in the hold and that the corpse in his office was the body of someone else Cora murdered and then magically disguised as him. Cora's plan is to use Archie's knowledge of the deepest secrets of Storybrooke's residents in order to discover and exploit Rumplestiltskin's weaknesses.

== Production ==
"The Cricket Game" was co-written by producer Robert Hull and co-executive producer David H. Goodman and directed by Dean White.

== Reception ==
=== Ratings ===
This outing held steady from the previous episode, scoring a 3.1/8 among 18-49s with 9.1 million viewers tuning in.

=== Reviews ===
The episode received positive reviews from critics.

Entertainment Weekly critic Hilary Busis gave it a good review: "Once Upon a Time tackled these questions and more tonight, returning from its hiatus with a winter premiere heavy on setup and light on payoff -- just what we should have expected from an hour meant to kick-start the season's second half. Still, any episode that features Regina suggesting that Red take herself for a walk is A-Okay in my book."

Oliver Sava of The A.V. Club gave it a B: "Once Upon A Time flew off the rails during the first half of this season, but its first episode back from winter hiatus makes some promising strides in the right direction. As Emma and Snow White are getting accustomed to life back in Storybrooke, a tragic crime throws them back in the drama, but writers David H. Goodman and Robert Hull are setting up a new plot without backtracking any progress made with the characters."

Amy Ratcliffe of IGN gave the episode an 8.5, proclaiming that "Once Upon a Time demonstrates how not to be a parent in this week's wrenching episode." She also added that "Parrilla does a masterful job at playing all the sides of Regina" and that it was "cool to see Emma intentionally using magic for the first time."
