= Manhattan (Once Upon a Time) =

- Once Upon a Time episode
- Episode no.: Season 2 Episode 14
- Directed by: Dean White
- Written by: Edward Kitsis; Adam Horowitz
- Original air date: February 17, 2013

Guest appearances
- Ethan Embry as Greg Mendell; Brighid Fleming as young Seer; Barbara Hershey as Cora/The Queen of Hearts; Shannon Lucio as Seer; Michael Raymond-James as Baelfire/Neal Cassidy; Rachel Shelley as Milah

Episode chronology
← Previous "Tiny"	Next → "The Queen Is Dead"
- Once Upon a Time season 2

"Manhattan" is the 14th episode of the second season of the American ABC fantasy/drama television series Once Upon a Time, and the show's 36th episode overall, which aired on February 17, 2013.

It was co-written by Edward Kitsis and Adam Horowitz, while being directed by Dean White.

In this episode, Emma Swan (Jennifer Morrison), Henry (Jared S. Gilmore), and Mr. Gold (Robert Carlyle) arrive in Manhattan to find his son Baelfire (Michael Raymond-James), only to have Emma regret the trip after memories come back to haunt her. Meanwhile, in the Enchanted Forest, a young Rumplestiltskin is to fight in the Ogre Wars, but is then hesitant after a seer (Shannon Lucio) reveals his fate.

The episode was received positively by critics, with most praising Robert Carlyle's role as Rumplestiltskin during the flashback. The episode also saw an increase in ratings from the previous episode, with 7.50 million viewers watching, garnering an 18-49 rating of 2.4.

== Title card ==
New York City's skyline stands beyond the Enchanted Forest.

== Plot ==
=== In the Characters' Past ===
Rumplestiltskin (Robert Carlyle) is drafted into the Ogres War. Milah (Rachel Shelley) is alarmed, but Rumplestiltskin is eager to free himself of his father's legacy of cowardice. Milah exhorts him to fight honorably, and hopes they'll start a family when he returns. At the front, he is assigned to guard a prisoner, which proves to be a young girl who has deformed eye sockets but functioning eyes on her hands; she is a Seer, able to see the past and future. She demonstrates her knowledge of Rumplestiltskin's earlier life, then informs him that Milah is pregnant with a son, but that Rumplestiltskin's actions the next day will leave the child fatherless. He does not believe her, but she says he will once the army rides cows into battle. That night, another soldier describes their wounded comrades as lucky, because they'll be sent home. The men are then ordered to ride into battle, on leather saddles termed "cows." Rumplestiltskin panics and, believing he is destined to die in battle the next day, crushes his own leg with a hammer. Rumplestiltskin returns home to find Milah cradling their son, Baelfire. She is aghast to see confirmation of the rumor that he took the cowardly action of wounding himself to escape the battle, and she denounces him. He did not want to leave his son fatherless as his own father did by abandoning him, but Milah says that to be a coward's son is a worse fate, and it would have been better if he had died. Milah angrily leaves, and Rumplestiltskin promises to never leave Baelfire.

Years later, after Baelfire has left the Enchanted Forest, Rumplestiltskin tracks down the now-adult Seer (Shannon Lucio) and criticizes her for omitting the details of his destiny. He then attacks her and demands to know how to find his son. She says that he will find him after many years and that it will require a powerful curse that will be both cast and broken by others. When he demands to know more, she asks him to take on the "burden" of her prophetic powers. He agrees, but is overcome by a multitude of visions, while the Seer is left dying. She tells him that, with time, he will learn to understand. As she dies, she informs him that he'll be led to his son by a boy who will also be his undoing. Rumplestiltskin states his intention to kill that boy.

=== In New York City ===
In New York City, Emma Swan (Jennifer Morrison), Henry (Jared S. Gilmore), and Mr. Gold (Carlyle) arrive at an apartment building that Gold's magic identified as Baelfire's location. Emma rings the only buzzer that lacks an occupant's name, claiming to be delivering a package; someone immediately flees the building via the fire escape. Gold demands that Emma fulfill her favor by bringing Baelfire to talk to him, so she gives chase and, upon tackling him, is shocked to recognize Baelfire as her former lover, Neal Cassidy (Michael Raymond-James). They argue over her bringing Rumplestiltskin to New York and Neal abandoning Emma years earlier, and Neal ultimately agrees to continue the conversation only if Emma will join him at a bar. There, Neal explains that he did not originally know her identity but was informed of it by August Booth; it is revealed that what August showed him was a typewritten statement identifying him as Baelfire. Emma finds their coincidental meeting to be inexplicable, but Neal suggests that it was fate and that something good may have come from their relationship; Emma denies it. When he notices that she still wears the keychain he gave her, she returns it to him and says it's only a reminder not to trust anyone. She tells him she intends to uphold her deal with Gold, but he asks that she lie that she was unable to catch him, as this will end all contact between them. Emma calls Mary Margaret (Ginnifer Goodwin) to explain the situation; Baelfire/Neal is Henry's father. Mary Margaret says that Henry deserves to know the truth, but Emma wants to protect Henry; Mary Margaret suggests that she is trying to protect herself. Mary Margaret then tells David (Josh Dallas) about Emma's discovery, and they discuss how everyone in their family might be affected by it.

Meanwhile, Henry and Gold wait at the apartment building. Gold thanks Henry for bringing Emma to Storybrooke. Henry hopes that, since he forgave Emma, Baelfire will forgive Gold. Gold says that things do not always happen as expected. Henry asks why he does not look into the future, and Gold explains that doing so is complicated and the future is like a puzzle. Emma arrives and claims that Baelfire escaped. Unsatisfied, Gold breaks into Neal's apartment over Emma's objections. When Emma discovers that Neal has kept their dreamcatcher, Gold becomes suspicious of her interest in it and violently demands to know what she is hiding from him. Neal returns and interrupts the fight, explaining that he did not return for Gold's sake, but because he does not want Emma to be punished for breaking her deal. He demands that Gold leave, but it soon becomes clear to Gold that his son and Emma know each other. Henry demands to know what is going on, at which Gold figures out the truth; Neal notes Henry's age and Emma must acknowledge that he is their son, and thus that what she previously told Henry about his father was a lie. Henry runs out onto the fire escape, pursued by Emma. Emma admits that Neal represented a part of her life she wanted to forget, and that her reasons for lying were for her own benefit, not Henry's. Henry compares Emma to Regina, because of their lies, and demands to meet his father.

In the apartment, Neal agrees to discharge Emma's debt to Gold by letting him talk. Gold invites Neal to Storybrooke, where he can magically change him into a teenager again and raise him properly; Neal rejects the idea as "insane." Neal notes that Gold still thinks magic is the solution to every problem. He tells Gold that he can never make up for the trauma he caused; Neal has been haunted by nightmares of his father letting him go, and now he needs to let him go in return. Neal and Emma agree to try to avoid hurting Henry as they did each other. Neal goes to speak to Henry, and they introduce themselves to each other. Gold looks on, unsettled by the knowledge that his own grandson will be his undoing.

=== In Storybrooke ===
Regina (Lana Parrilla) is upset that Henry has left town with Emma and Gold, but Cora (Barbara Hershey) reassures her that Henry is safe and will return. Captain Hook/Killian Jones (Colin O'Donoghue) wants to pursue and kill Gold, who is vulnerable without his magic, but Cora instead asks his help in locating the Dark One's dagger, which will enable them to kill Gold in Storybrooke. Regina visits Belle (Emilie de Ravin) in the hospital; upon determining that Belle does not remember anything useful, Regina magically renders her unconscious and levitates the contents of her purse, locating a note with a Dewey decimal number. This leads Regina, Cora, and Hook to a map hidden on a bookshelf in the library. Hook deciphers the map, but Cora then attacks him magically and knocks him unconscious, her use for him at an end. She reveals to Regina that her plan is for them to use the dagger to command Gold to kill Mary Margaret, David, and Emma, leaving Regina blameless in Henry's eyes.

Greg Mendell (Ethan Embry) tells "Her" over the phone that he has been released from the hospital but will remain in Storybrooke; he explains by sending her a video of Regina using magic.

== Production ==
"Manhattan" was co-written by series co-creators/executive producers Adam Horowitz and Edward Kitsis and directed by The Shield veteran Dean White.

This episode marks a promotion for previously recurring guest star Colin O'Donoghue (Captain Hook) to series regular.

== Reception ==
=== Ratings ===
This episode posted a 2.4/6 among 18-49s with 7.50 million viewers tuning in, reversing a decline from the last two outings. The episode placed second in its timeslot behind the twenty-second season of The Amazing Race, and placed third for the night, behind The Amazing Race and Family Guy.

=== Reviews ===
The episode was received positively by most critics.

Entertainment Weekly critic Hilary Busis gave it a good review: "'Manhattan' may not have been Once's most gripping episode, but it was one of its deeper installments -- as is generally the case when Rump takes center stage."

The Huffington Post's Laura Prudom liked the episode: "Despite many of us predicting the outcome of the hour, 'Manhattan' proved to be a surprisingly gripping episode of Once Upon a Time, mostly because of the intriguing family dynamics at play. Emma was understandably paranoid that her relationship with Neal was all part of some larger scheme set in motion by Rumpel, while Neal was in no great rush to reunite with his father after Rumpel abandoned him to a land without magic, to grow up lost and alone in our world just as Emma did." She also praised the Seer's part in the episode, saying, "[She] was an interesting addition to the mythology, and a welcome reminder to Rumpel that all magic comes with a price, for him just as much as for anyone else. It was a creepy and effective character design, and it will be interesting to see how her prophecy about Henry plays out in the coming weeks."

Amy Ratcliffe of IGN also gave the Seer's appearance a positive review, saying, "It was neat to see more pieces of the puzzle come together through the Seer...[but] the worst part of it all is Rumpel could go after Henry now because of the Seer's words. Before this episode I didn't think he'd be willing to go back to such a dark place, but since he's been rejected by Baelfire? It's time to worry about Henry."

Oliver Sava of The A.V. Club gave it a C : "This show has gotten very good at repeating itself, so anyone who wants to jump right in this week should have no problem because everyone makes it excessively clear how they feel, why they feel that way, and the events that transpired to make them feel that way. That’s great for catching people up, but when it happens week after week it becomes laborious, especially when the motivations don’t make very much sense when spoken aloud." He also believe that the scenes featuring Regina were becoming less than impressive: "Regina was showing so much promise at the start of this season, but as is usually the case, magic shows up to throw her off course."
