= Red-Handed =

- Once Upon a Time episode
- Episode no.: Season 1 Episode 15
- Directed by: Ron Underwood
- Written by: Jane Espenson
- Original air date: March 11, 2012

Guest appearances
- David Anders as Dr. Whale; Bill Dow as Mayor Tomkins; Beverley Elliott as Granny; Jesse Hutch as Peter; Meghan Ory as Red Riding Hood/Ruby

Episode chronology
← Previous "Dreamy"	Next → "Heart of Darkness"
- Once Upon a Time season 1

"Red-Handed" is the 15th episode of the American fairy tale/drama television series Once Upon a Time, which aired in the United States on ABC on March 11, 2012.

The series takes place in the fictional seaside town of Storybrooke, Maine, in which the residents are actually characters from various fairy tales that were transported to the "real world" town by a powerful curse. This episode deals with Red Riding Hood's backstory, and Ruby being hired by Emma.

It was written by Jane Espenson, while being directed by Ron Underwood.

== Title card ==
Red Riding Hood walks through the Enchanted Forest.

== Plot ==
=== In the characters' past ===
In a small village in the Enchanted Forest, a happy, cloak-wearing Red Riding Hood (Meghan Ory) flirts with her love Peter (Jesse Hutch) through her window before being called away by her Granny (Beverley Elliott), also known as the Widow Lucas. A group of villagers show up at their cottage door, planning to go after a giant wolf that has been killing their sheep. Red asks if she can go, but Granny refuses to let her and tells her to stay inside with her cloak on—even after they secure their cottage. The following morning, Red goes to check on the chickens, only to come across a sleepy Snow White (Ginnifer Goodwin). Red agrees to help Snow, who, being a fugitive, asks to be called Mary. When they go to the well for water, they notice the water is filled with blood and find a trail of slaughtered bodies left lying on the snowy ground. Later on, during a town hall meeting, Granny tells the citizens of her own encounter with another wolf, which killed her family 60 years earlier and left her with a scarred arm. She claims that there is no way anyone can kill the creature. Despite this, Red and a reluctant Snow decide to search for the wolf on their own.

Red, a superior tracker, finds the wolf prints, but they morph into human boot prints as the duo follow them. Worse, they lead to Red's window and the only person she remembers seeing there is Peter. That night, Red meets Peter to tell him he is a werewolf. She has to tie him up on full moon nights, but she will stay with him. Back at Granny's cottage, Granny finds Snow posing as Red in her cloak on her bed. Snow assures Granny they are safe since Red has Peter tied up. Granny is dismayed at this and explains that Red is the wolf and the curse has been passed among the family. Granny herself was a wolf but has lost most of her power due to age, though she can still track Red by scent. They find the tree where Red tied up Peter, but it is too late—she has already transformed and devoured him. Granny strikes Red with a silver-tipped arrow and orders Snow to put the cloak over her as it is magical and keeps the wearer from becoming a wolf. Red returns to her human form, confused at first, then horrified to discover what she has done. The hunting party closes in as Granny tells the girls to make their escape into the woods.

=== In Storybrooke ===
At the sheriff's office, Emma Swan (Jennifer Morrison) asks David Nolan (Josh Dallas) a few questions about Kathryn's absence, but since there is no proof of a crime, she lets him go. Elsewhere at Granny's Diner, Ruby (Ory) is chatting with August (Eion Bailey), who tells her about his world travels. Granny calls her over and tells her to start the paperwork that comes with extra business. Ruby answers that she would rather see the world like August and quits her tedious job. Emma and Mary Margaret (Goodwin) run into Ruby trying to brush off Dr. Whale (David Anders), and get a ride out of town. They offer to take her home with them so she can figure things out. Mary Margaret later goes to the spot where Kathryn had disappeared and runs into David, who is now acting strange and keeps repeating over and over that he's looking for his wife, leaving Mary Margaret very concerned about his behavior.

Back in the sheriff's office, Henry (Jared S. Gilmore) helps Ruby look for jobs, such as being a bike courier. When Ruby answers the phone and takes messages for Emma, she applauds her for her help and offers her a job as her assistant. Ruby goes to pick up lunch for everyone just as Mary Margaret walks in to tell Emma everything that happened with David. At the diner, Ruby tries to flaunt how happy she is now, but Granny doesn't seem to buy it. She tells Ruby her new job is basically the same as her old one, majorly cutting down Ruby's confidence. When she returns with the food, Emma tells Ruby that she's going to do real police work and help her find David. They follow tracks in the woods when Ruby hears something. With Ruby in the lead, she and Emma find David groaning and barely conscious. He reveals that he doesn't remember anything since leaving the sheriff's office the previous night. At the same time, Ruby doesn’t know how she found him.

In the hospital, Dr. Whale tells David and Emma that there is a good chance he was asleep during the whole ordeal and it might have been the same thing as when he came out of his coma. Regina (Lana Parrilla) then barges in, being David's emergency contact, and immediately tells Emma to leave. In the hall, Emma calls Ruby, telling her to go to the Toll Bridge and see if she finds anything. There, Ruby uses her unknown senses and instincts to find a box buried under a washed-up piece of wood. She screams in horror when she sees what is inside of the box. Back in the office, Emma opens the box. She tells Ruby she did a good job, but Ruby doesn't feel cut out for the excitement of police work. Ruby goes to the diner where she talks to Granny who reveals that the markings on her arm are here in Storybrooke and that her arm bothers her once a month. Granny tells Ruby she had asked her to learn every part of running the diner so that when she retires, she can leave the diner to her. Granny wants to leave it to someone who loves it as well. After hugging her, Ruby gets her job back and turns down Emma's job offer.

At David's place of work, he paces in the lobby with Mary Margaret trying to calm him down. Emma comes in to tell them about the box, which contained a human heart and fingerprints inside. David reacts right away, telling Emma to put him in handcuffs, but she stops him to reveal that the fingerprints belong to another suspect, Mary Margaret.

== Production ==
"Red-Handed" was written by consulting producer Jane Espenson, while Tremors director, Ron Underwood, directed the episode.

Beverley later recalled that her friends all assumed that Peter was the wolf of the story, and never suspected that Red might be. "The whole room screamed," she said, when they learned the truth.

It was included in Reawakened: A Once Upon a Time Tale – a novelization of the first season – which was published by Hyperion Books in 2013.

== Reception ==
=== Ratings ===
The episode first aired on March 11, 2012. The episode's ratings and viewership decreased from the previous week, possibly due to Daylight Saving Time in the United States. It had an 18-49 rating of 2.9/8 and was watched by 9.81 million viewers. It was also tied for first in its timeslot with The Amazing Race on CBS while at the same was ahead of The Simpsons on FOX and Harry's Law on NBC. In Canada, the episode finished in twelfth place for the week with an estimated 1.512 million viewers, an increase from the 1.44 million of the previous episode.

== Cast ==
=== Starring ===
- Ginnifer Goodwin as Snow White/Mary Margaret Blanchard
- Jennifer Morrison as Emma Swan
- Lana Parrilla as Regina Mills
- Josh Dallas as David Nolan
- Eion Bailey as August Booth
- Jared S. Gilmore as Henry Mills
- Raphael Sbarge (credit only)
- Robert Carlyle (credit only)

=== Guest Starring ===
- David Anders as Dr. Whale
- Bill Dow as Mayor Tomkins
- Beverley Elliott as Granny
- Jesse Hutch as Peter
- Meghan Ory as Red Riding Hood/Ruby

=== Uncredited ===
- Unknown as Floyd
