= What Happened to Frederick =

- Once Upon a Time episode
- Episode no.: Season 1 Episode 13
- Directed by: Dean White
- Written by: David H. Goodman
- Original air date: February 19, 2012

Guest appearances
- Eion Bailey as August Wayne Booth; Alan Dale as King George; Anastasia Griffith as Abigail/Kathryn Nolan; Beverly Elliott as Granny; Meghan Ory as Red Riding Hood/Ruby

Episode chronology
| ← Previous "Skin Deep" | Next → "Dreamy" |
- Once Upon a Time season 1

"What Happened to Frederick" is the 13th episode of the American fairy tale/drama television series Once Upon a Time, which aired in the United States on ABC on February 19, 2012.

The series takes place in the fictional seaside town of Storybrooke, Maine, in which the residents are actually characters from various fairy tales that were transported to the "real world" town by a powerful curse. In this episode, David (Josh Dallas) finds his love for Mary Margaret (Ginnifer Goodwin) growing stronger and finally agrees to end his loveless marriage with Kathryn (Anastasia Griffith) by telling her about his secret relationship, and Emma Swan (Jennifer Morrison) becomes more intrigued with The Stranger (Eion Bailey), while Prince James (Dallas) is asked by Abigail (Griffith) to recover something precious that was lost to her.

It was written by David H. Goodman and was directed by Dean White.

== Title card ==
A golden statue of a knight in armor stands under a gazebo in the Enchanted Forest.

== Plot ==
=== In the characters' past ===
In the Enchanted Forest, King George's (Alan Dale) men hunt for Prince James (Josh Dallas) who has fled his wedding to Princess Abigail (Anastasia Griffith). James narrowly escapes, with Abigail's help. When he asks why she would do this, Abigail tells James she does not want this arranged marriage any more than he does. She takes him to a monument containing a life-sized, golden statue of Frederick, the man she loves. During an ambush, he had tried to protect her father, King Midas, but had accidentally touched him and been transformed to gold by Midas' curse. Abigail explains that there is a lake with waters reported to have enough magic to restore Frederick, but no man has come back from that lake alive. James agrees to risk it because if he succeeds, Abigail's suffering will end, but if he fails, his own suffering will end.

Abigail takes James to the lake and shows him a shrine where others have left offerings to appease the creature within. She offers to accompany him, but James tells her he will go on alone since he does not want any life in his hands but his own. He commands the beast to show itself and is answered by a beautiful siren (or, more probably, a rusalka). Even though James knows the deceptive nature of the siren, she transforms into the image of Snow White (Ginnifer Goodwin) and attempts to seduce him. It takes all his will to refuse the temptress so she tries to drown him by force. James manages to cut himself free and pick up a dagger to kill the Siren. He returns to Abigail victorious and the water restores Frederick (Greyston Holt) to life. The reunited lovers are overjoyed and grateful. James is inspired to carry on his quest to find his love, Snow White. He meets Red Riding Hood (Meghan Ory), who informs him that Snow White left to look for him and tell him she loves him. James realizes King George forced Snow White to tell him she doesn't love him. With the King's men closing in on James, he pulls Red Riding Hood up on his horse and the two escape.

=== In Storybrooke ===
In the present day, Kathryn (Griffith) tells David (Dallas) she has been accepted at a law school in Boston. She figures they could use a fresh start, but David only replies that he needs to take a walk, leaving out the fact that he is taking this walk with Mary Margaret (Goodwin). He tells Mary Margaret that he chooses her over his wife and is not going to leave Storybrooke. Mary Margaret insists he must tell Kathryn the truth and let her go to Boston alone. David attempts to do this but instead makes up an excuse about not reconnecting as he breaks up with Kathryn. She is devastated, but remains unaware that there is another woman involved.

Later on, Kathryn stops by Regina's (Lana Parrilla) home, where she tells the Mayor about David leaving her. Regina shows photographic evidence to Kathryn about David and Mary Margaret's affair. Meanwhile, David lies to Mary Margaret he told Kathryn about them. Soon after, Kathryn visits and slaps Mary Margaret in the middle of the school hallway and tells the confused teacher that David lied to them both. Later, Mary Margaret notices people are avoiding her and whispering behind her back, including Granny (Beverly Elliot) who tells her she should be ashamed of herself, revealing that the news of her affair had spread around the town. She asks David why he never told Kathryn the truth, to which he replies that he didn't want anyone to get hurt. She tells him that they do not have love but something destructive that must stop, so she breaks up with him.

The Stranger (Eion Bailey) tells Emma Swan (Jennifer Morrison) his name is August Wayne Booth. He tells her to meet him outside of Granny's after work. In the meantime, August is restoring Henry's book, handling the pages in a darkroom, applying a chemical, hanging them up to dry, then assembling the book anew. At the end of the day, August and Emma meet and he takes her to an old well for a drink of water. August explains to a confused Emma that the well is supposed to have restorative qualities and will restore what was lost. Hours later, as Emma starts brushing leaves off her car, she finds the red metal box that holds Henry's (Jared S. Gilmore) book, while August secretly watches her.

Elsewhere, Kathryn goes to see Regina again, this time to apologize for what she said. Kathryn admits that she was never in love with David, and that she is moving to Boston alone. Kathryn adds that she wrote letters to both David and Mary Margaret telling them to be together, as they looked happy in the pictures. Insistent on preventing this act of forgiveness from becoming known, Regina steals the letter addressed to David and burns it. Later, Emma returns the book to Henry, who believes that its discovery is a sign that things will change for the better. Kathryn sets off in her car for Boston, however, as per Henry's warning about people trying to leave the town, her car winds up in a ditch. It is discovered by the school gym teacher (who was Frederick (Holt) in the Enchanted Forest), however, Kathryn is not in the crashed car; she is missing.

== Production ==
"What Happened to Frederick" was written by co-executive producer David H. Goodman, and The Shield veteran, Dean White, directed the installment. The episode was included in Reawakened: A Once Upon a Time Tale – a novelization of the first season – which was published by Hyperion Books in 2013.

== Ratings ==
Ratings and viewership for this episode were up from the previous episode. It had an 18-49 rating of 3.1 and was seen by 9.84 million viewers, up 9 percent, and although it was still down from Fruit of the Poisonous Tree it was able to win its timeslot for the night.

In Canada, the episode finished in eighteenth place for the week with an estimated 1.497 million viewers, a decrease from the 1.55 million of the previous episode.

== Cast ==
=== Starring ===
- Ginnifer Goodwin as Snow White/Mary Margaret Blanchard
- Jennifer Morrison as Emma Swan
- Lana Parrilla as Regina Mills
- Josh Dallas as Prince Charming/David Nolan
- Jared S. Gilmore as Henry Mills
- Raphael Sbarge (credit only)
- Robert Carlyle (credit only)

=== Guest Starring ===
- Eion Bailey as August Booth
- Alan Dale as King George
- Beverley Elliott as Granny
- Anastasia Griffith as Abigail/Kathryn Nolan
- Meghan Ory as Red Riding Hood/Ruby

=== Co-Starring ===
- Greyston Holt as Frederick/Jim
- Aria Pullman as Siren

=== Uncredited ===
- Unknown as Floyd
