= The Submarine Kid =

- Digital release poster
- Directed by: Eric Bilitch
- Written by: Eric Bilitch; Finn Wittrock
- Produced by: Deborah Del Prete; Jason Gurvitz
- Starring: Finn Wittrock; Emilie de Ravin; Matt O'Leary; Jack Coleman; Nancy Travis; Alphonso McAuley; Hunter Cope; Joe Massingill
- Cinematography: Zakk Eginton
- Edited by: Benjamin Redmond
- Music by: Harlan Silverman
- Production companies: Coronet Films; Sterling Features; StylesFour Productions
- Distributed by: MarVista Entertainment
- Release dates: November 12, 2015 (Napa Valley Film Festival); January 12, 2016 (United States)
- Running time: 109 minutes
- Country: United States
- Language: English

The Submarine Kid is a 2015 American drama film, directed by Eric Bilitch and written by Bilitch and Finn Wittrock. The film stars Finn Wittrock and Emilie de Ravin, with supporting performances from Jack Coleman, Nancy Travis, Alphonso McAuley, Hunter Cope, and Joe Massingill. The film had its world premiere on November 12, 2015 at the Napa Valley Film Festival. The film was released through video on demand on January 12, 2016, by MarVista Entertainment.

== Plot ==
Spencer Koll, a Marine who has just returned home from a horrific experience while serving, struggles to bring himself back into a normal life with his friends and girlfriend. Spencer then meets Alice, who is everything to him, but is meanwhile haunted by a ghost from his time during the war. Alice then introduces him to the story of the submarine kid at a party.

Spencer hears his friends outside and tries to break up a fight between his friends and other party attendees. Spencer then suffers a flashback and attacks the instigator of the fight, beating him, and severely wounding him. The flashback eventually brings Spencer to driving his car with Alice and her screaming for him to stop. Spencer is eventually calmed down by Alice who he then takes to Thunder Lake. Spencer shows Alice a driving maneuver on a road near the lake and eventually have sex, resulting in Spencer concluding he never wants to leave Alice. Spencer then attempts the maneuver again with Alice, but this time crashes through the fence and into Thunder Lake. Spencer then wakes up in the hospital thinking he has killed Alice as no one knows who or where she is. Realizing Alice is only with him while he is suffocating underwater, or hallucinating, Spencer spends the rest of the movie trying to escape his flashbacks and to join Alice by holding his breath underwater for longer and longer periods of time. With each near drowning, his family and friends become more and more worried about his decaying mental state.

Spencer eventually discovers that Alice is actually the ghost of the Submarine Kid's girlfriend. Alice eventually discourages Spencer's self-destructive behavior telling him that no world is perfect and that he can't escape his haunting memories in reality by drowning himself to be with her.

After receiving his discharge from the Marine Corps, Spencer has another flashback, this time of the entire incident that has caused his PTSD. Spencer is shown in a foreign country with his squad when they happen upon armed militants. With failing radios, Spencer thinks he is ordered to shoot the militants, and is actually instructed not to. Spencer shoots and kills a woman who was used as a human shield by a militant. This woman is the hallucination that has been appearing in Spencer's waking life. The squad retreats, and in the process, Spencer is shot and dragged out by his squad.

The next morning, Spencer's friends find him in the middle of Thunder Lake and realize he is trying to drown himself again. Spencer has another visit with Alice, who is in a wedding dress, waiting for the Submarine Kid underneath a boardwalk. Instead of the Submarine Kid, Spencer shows up and says he wants to stay with Alice forever. Alice says she cannot, and cannot make him become the Submarine Kid like she thought she could. Alice continues, telling Spencer that the wedding isn't meant for him and that they can never move on if they are together. Spencer tries to prove his devotion to being the Submarine Kid by asking Alice to time him as he drowns himself again. Meanwhile, in the real world, Spencer's friends and family are desperately trying to find him in Thunder Lake while Spencer, who is below the surface, finds the skeletal remains of the original Submarine Kid. Back in Spencer's dream world, he resurfaces in his combat uniform asking Alice how long he was under for, only to find the ghost woman he shot and killed while deployed. Spencer realizes he cannot run from his emotional trauma, and resurfaces in the real world with the Submarine Kid's goggles. Spencer leaves the goggles near the shore of Thunder Lake, allowing Alice's ghost to move now as she can now be with the Submarine Kid.

== Cast ==
- Finn Wittrock as Spencer Koll
- Emilie de Ravin as Alice
- Paul Eiding as Thunder Lake Mayor
- Jack Coleman as Mr. Koll
- Nancy Travis as Mrs. Koll
- Alphonso McAuley as Paul
- Hunter Cope as Mailer
- Joe Massingill as Howie
- Cooper Thornto as Henry
- Jared Abrahamson as Cooper
- Dylan Moore as Darla
- Michael Beach as Marc
- Matt O'Leary as Toad
- Jessy Schram as Emily
- Scott Levy as Sgt. Barton
- Dylan Wittrock as submarine kid

== Production ==
In April 2014, it was announced Finn Wittrock, and Emilie de Ravin had both joined the film. An Indiegogo campaign was set up in order to fund the movie's post-production process, a total of $25,700 was raised.

== Release ==
The film had its world premiere on November 12, 2015 at the Napa Valley Film Festival. The film was released through video on demand on January 12, 2016.

== Critical response ==
Keith Watson of Red Carpet Crash called the film "languorous and dull" adding that "writer-director Eric Bilitch (making his feature debut) dramatizes this psychological conflict in terms of bland stereotypes. Bilitch’s direction is flat and his characters are conceived too broadly to connect." In synopsis, Watson wrote " While I’m not sure any amount of editing could completely transform this material—the footage is too drab, the characters too shallow—a significant overhaul could make this a significantly more interesting film."

John Armstrong of PunchDrunkCritics.com wrote "At first glance, there doesn't seem to be much to The Submarine Kid. A returning-Marine story starring and co-written by the extremely pretty and '50s-marquee-idol-named Finn Wittrock. At second glance, though, well, there's still not a lot to it." Armstrong added that the film "comes up watery and insubstantial."
