= Dark House (2009 film) =

- DVD cover art
- Directed by: Darin Scott
- Screenplay by: Darin Scott
- Story by: Kerry Douglas Dye; Darin Scott
- Produced by: Mark Sonoda; Nick Allan
- Starring: Jeffrey Combs; Meghan Ory; Bevin Prince; Diane Salinger
- Cinematography: Philip Lee
- Edited by: Charles Bornstein
- Music by: Vincent Gillioz
- Production companies: Fatal Frame Pictures; Red Shogun Pictures
- Distributed by: Lightning Media
- Release dates: April 19, 2009 (Fangoria's Weekend of Horrors); July 30, 2010 (United States)
- Running time: 85 minutes
- Country: United States
- Language: English

Dark House is a supernatural horror film directed by Darin Scott and stars Jeffrey Combs, Meghan Ory and Diane Salinger with Matt Cohen, Shelly Cole, Danso Gordon, Ryan Melander, Bevin Prince, Meghan Maureen McDonough and Scott Whyte. The film was scripted by Darin Scott with the story created by Kerry Douglas Dye and Darin Scott. The movie was produced by Mark Sonoda and Nick Allan. Dark House opened theatrically for one week engagements on Friday, July 30 in New York City, Dallas and San Francisco and was released on DVD September 28, 2010.

== Plot ==
Dark House tells the story of the Old Darrode House, where Mrs. Janet Darrode ran a foster home for children and then murdered all of them and killed herself. The film opens with a young girl who walks into the house on the day of the massacre and discovers the bloody scene of the crime.

Fourteen years later, local girl and student actress Claire Thompson has been seeing her therapist over an experience she had in the house which left her disturbed. He suggests that she revisit the old house, but she has never been able to get past the gate.

When horror mogul Walston Rey appears in her advanced acting class, he reveals that he has converted the house into a horror attraction site and that he wants to hire Claire and her classmates to work as hosts to his attraction. Claire sees the opportunity as a chance to enter the house safely surrounded by her peers. In the house, Walston and his staff proudly show off their holographic three-dimensional system which creates lifelike interactive and harmless horror figures, but when Mrs. Darrode's ghost gets into the system, the holograms become real and are activated by fear. They start killing everyone inside as the survivors try to shut down the system and try to escape.

Claire finally manages to remember what happened in the house years ago. She was fostered under the care of Mrs. Darrode, who was an abusive religious fanatic. As a child Claire one day led a rebellion among the other kids. They burned their Holy Bibles and rejected Mrs. Darrode's teachings. Mrs. Darrode flew into a psychotic rage and murdered all the children, labeling them sinners and heretics, with the exception of Claire who only managed to escape by hiding in a closet. Then struck by remorse for what she had done, Mrs. Darrode thrust her hands into the kitchen garbage disposal and killed herself.

In the present day after remembering, Claire loses her fear and flies at Mrs. Darrode, who disappears. She is discovered by the police, who believe she was responsible for the murders and is committed to a mental asylum.

In the final scenes of the film, the girl who discovered the scene all those years ago also comes to the house to try to come to terms with her trauma. She and her boyfriend are quickly locked into the house and are killed. The film ends with Claire strapped to a straitjacket in a padded cell screaming "SHE'S STILL OUT THERE!"

== Cast ==
- Jeffrey Combs as Walston Rey
- Meghan Ory as Claire Thompson
- Diane Salinger as Mrs. Janet Darrode
- Matt Cohen as Rudy
- Shelly Cole as Lily
- Danso Gordon as Eldon
- Ryan Melander as Bruce
- Bevin Prince as Ariel
- Meghan Maureen McDonough as Samantha
- Scott Whyte as Moreton

== Reception ==
Critical reception has been mixed. Fearnet felt that while the movie "doesn't always work as a cohesive whole" it did "have more than a few good moments/ideas, and (thankfully) a handful of dark twists and turns that help to keep things interesting." The Dallas News considered this film to be "about as scary as The Simpsons "Treehouse of Horror" episode." Shock Till You Drop commented that Dark House was a "confused movie" and that while it did have some positives, ultimately "there are no scares here, and it really struggles with finding an identity for too long."
