= Sisters (Once Upon a Time) =

- Once Upon a Time episode
- Episode no.: Season 5 Episode 19
- Directed by: Romeo Tirone
- Written by: David H. Goodman & Brigitte Hales
- Production code: 519
- Original air date: April 24, 2016

Guest appearances
- Greg Germann as Hades; Barbara Hershey as Cora/Queen of Hearts; Robbie A. Kay as Malcolm/Peter Pan/Pied Piper; Tony Perez as Prince Henry Mills; Victoria Smurfit as Cruella De Vil/Cruella Feinberg; Ava Acres as Young Regina; Isabella Blake-Thomas as Young Zelena; Adrian Hough as Woodcutter

Episode chronology
← Previous "Ruby Slippers"	Next → "Firebird"
- Once Upon a Time season 5

"Sisters" is the nineteenth episode of the fifth season of the American fantasy drama series Once Upon a Time, which aired on April 24, 2016.

In this episode, Regina and Cora work together to keep Zelena away from Hades; and James impersonates David. In flashbacks, Cora brings Zelena to the Enchanted Forest to save Regina's life.

== Plot ==
=== Opening sequence ===
An Underworld windmill is featured in the red-tinted forest.

=== Event chronology ===
The Enchanted Forest events take place years after "The Miller's Daughter" and years before "The Stable Boy". The Oz events take place years after the first flashback scene of "It's Not Easy Being Green" and years before the rest of "It's Not Easy Being Green" flashbacks. The Underworld events take place after "Ruby Slippers".

=== In The Characters' Past ===
Many years ago, in the Enchanted Forest, a young Regina wishes that her mother Cora had more time to play. Without her mother watching her, Regina finds a magic wand and attempts to transform her doll into a real sister with whom to play, only to have the spell backfire, knocking her unconscious. Cora and Prince Henry realizes that the only way to save her is by bringing a magical family member to wake her up. Consequently, Cora visits Oz to bring back Zelena, who just used her magic to restock the logs she dropped. This angers her abusive adoptive father, who doesn't want Zelena to use her “wicked” magic. Cora immediately freezes the woodcutter as he is about to hit her (her adoptive mother wasn't around to protect Zelena this time), then gives Zelena the opportunity to prove that her magic can be used for good, which she accepts. As Zelena is able to wake Regina, the two are unaware of their being sisters at first, but over time become close, and quickly realize that they're related, when Zelena accidentally opens Cora's wand box, leading to Cora admitting that Regina and Zelena are sisters. Despite Regina's pleas to have Zelena in her life, Cora, believing that Zelena's presence will interfere with Regina's future of becoming the next queen, wipes both of their memories and sends Zelena back to Oz.

=== In the Underworld ===
As they look at the burning night sky over the Underworld Storybrooke, Hades and Zelena are on a date, as he explained why he created the world for her, then tells Zelena that he wants to follow her back to the real Storybrooke, if he is able to restore his heart and become human again. However, he also tells Zelena that in order to do that he wants to leave the outsiders in the Underworld forever, then he asks her to be his partner in chaos (a modified version of a wedding proposal), leaving Zelena feeling awkward. Hades also tells her that he took the precaution of adding the remaining outsiders' names to more tombstones, after Mary Margaret had her name replaced by David's. Unfortunately for Zelena, Regina saw this through a magic mirror, and then confronts Zelena afterwards, as the latter thinks that Hades, like Robin Hood (or Regina), might not be a villain forever. Regina explain this to the rest of the outsiders, saying that Zelena was thinking irrationally and in danger, and telling them that the only way to solve this problem was to go to Cora, to break them up. Cora is working in the Underworld Mill, situated above the Lethe, the yellow-colored River of Forgetfulness, and supervised by two guards. She finds a hook hidden under the stalks of grain, cuts off the black anti-magic handcuff, and uses her magic to knock out the guards. Escaping, she bumps into Hook who retrieves his hook and brings her to Regina.

When she discovers the truth about Zelena's feelings for Hades' from Regina, Cora suspects that her daughter is being played for a fool by Hades, so she makes a potion from the Lethe that would make Zelena forget about Hades. When Cora finally meets Zelena, this mother-daughter reunion doesn't go smoothly as planned, and even Zelena is on to what they did with the water from the River Lethe they put the spell on, as she turns down her mother's false apology. This leads to a fight between Regina and Zelena but before this escalates, Cora restores their childhood memories of each other and she regretted the way she raised them, and apologizes to her daughters. Now that the sisters have made peace, Cora decides that it's time for her to move on from her unfinished business. As they see their mother walk toward the bridge, the flames from the River of Fire erupt and wrap around her. But the flames die down, the bridge forms, and the gate opens, allowing Cora to move on to Mount Olympus to join her husband, Prince Henry Mills. Later on, Regina gives Zelena her blessing to be with Hades, who is waiting for her at the Underworld Diner for their second date, which Zelena sees as an opportunity to reform him.

In another situation involving sibling rivalries, David is confronted by James, who he blames for being taken away from their mother and being consigned to a worse life with King George. After James knocks David out by using his stun gun, he tricks his niece Emma and Robin Hood to lead him to Zelena's baby. James reveals himself when they reach the rendezvous point, after slapping an anti-magic cuff on Emma, and is joined by Cruella, who is still looking for a way to escape the Underworld, by stealing Zelena's baby for leverage with Hades. When Cruella and James enter the harbor, as part of their plan to send Emma and Robin into the River of Lost Souls, which will kill them, as they are still alive. David and Hook arrive to rescue Emma and Robin, before it's too late. Hook grabs the gun dropped by James and removed the cuffs from Emma, and Cruella runs back to safety. Meanwhile, David attempts to help James move on while confronting him, as James continues to believe that killing David is the "unfinished business" that is keeping him in the Underworld. After David's plea to help James falls on deaf ears, the twins continue fighting each other on the edge of the dock, with David wanting the others to stay out of the struggle. As James begins to lose, he pulls out a boot knife, despite David's pleas to stop. David eventually twists James off into the River of Lost Souls, condemning him to eternal torment, while Cruella flees the scene. Emma tells her father that there was nothing he could do to save James, despite his best efforts, and that some people just won't ever move on.

In between the events, Gold is looking over Belle's sleeping body, and despite his promise to her that he would use light magic to save her and their child, Gold decided that has no other choice but to do things "his way," using Dark Magic. Moments later, Gold surprises Zelena while she was en route to meet Hades. Since she was responsible for giving Belle the spindle that placed her under the Sleeping Curse, Gold brought Peter Pan along as "a loophole." As he introduces Zelena to his father, Pan tells Zelena that although she was "wicked," he was much worse, and Pan throws a bag over her to kidnap her.

== Production ==
This episode was dedicated in loving memory to one of the series' producer Scott Nimerfro, who died on April 17, 2016, six days prior to the episode's airing.

== Reception ==
Andrea Towers of Entertainment Weekly gave it a positive review: "Ah, siblinghood. It's a complicated thing under the best of circumstances, but when motherly abandonment is at hand, well, the emotional impact is everlasting. Such is the case for sisters Regina and Zelena and twin brothers David and James, each of whom grew up in highly unequal circumstances and have been at odds with one another ever since," then later adds "While the sisters are ready to start over on newly feel-good footing, not every sibling reunion is a happy one tonight."

In a review from Rickey.org, Nick Roman said, "Ultimately, I think Once Upon a Time has been doing a great job of telling character-driven stories this season, more so since the return from hiatus. “Sisters” is a surprisingly emotional episode that manages to bring character journeys full circle in poignant fashion. And I think these sorts of stories will make the final stretch of episodes towards the end of the season all the more resonant."

Amy Ratcliffe of IGN said of the episode, "With the Cora angle played out and worn thin, the success of this episode rested on the bond between Zelena and Regina. Their interactions weren't anything earthshaking, but it was sweet to watch them find some common ground and gain new understandings of each other thanks to restored memories. Their forgiveness and tolerance of Cora was far too kind though." Ratcliffe gave the episode a 7.5 rating out of 10.

Christine Orlando of TV Fanatic gave the episode a 3.9 out of 5.

Gwen Inhat of The AV Club gave the episode a B+.
