= Emilie de Ravin =

Australian actress (born 1981)

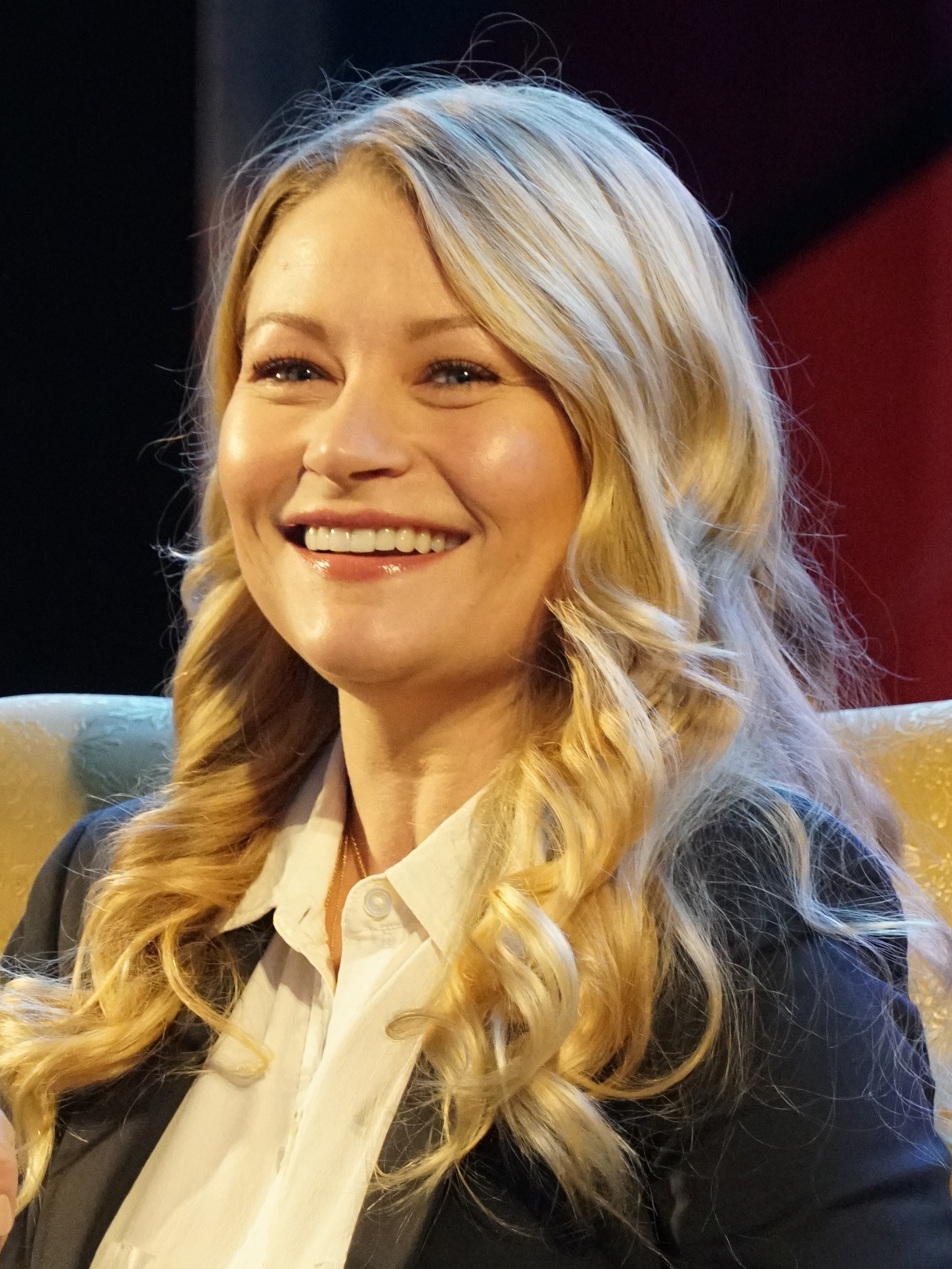
- De Ravin in Comic Con Brussels 2022
- Born: 27 December 1981 (age 44); Mount Eliza, Victoria, Australia
- Occupation: Actress
- Years active: 1999–present
- Spouse: Josh Janowicz (m. 2003; div. 2014)
- Partner: Eric Bilitch (2014–present)
- Children: 3

Emilie de Ravin (/ˈɛməli də ˈrævɪn/; born 27 December 1981) is an Australian actress. She first gained recognition for playing Tess Harding on The WB's science fiction television series Roswell (2000–2002). She went on to portray Claire Littleton on the ABC drama series Lost (2004–2008, 2010), and Belle on the ABC fantasy adventure series Once Upon a Time (2011–2018). De Ravin's film credits include Santa's Slay (2005), The Hills Have Eyes (2006) and Ball Don't Lie (2008), Brick (2005), Public Enemies (2009) and Remember Me (2010).

== Early life ==
De Ravin was born in Mount Eliza, Victoria, Australia, an outer southeastern suburb of Melbourne. She has French ancestry. Having studied ballet since the age of nine at Christa Cameron School of Ballet in Melbourne, and being home schooled by her mother, she was accepted into the Australian Ballet School at fifteen, where she performed in productions with The Australian Ballet as well as Danceworld 301.

She studied acting at Australia's National Institute of Dramatic Art, and with the Prime Time Actors Studio in Los Angeles.

== Career ==
De Ravin's first major role was a recurring part as Curupira in the supernatural series Beastmaster. She went on to appear as alien/human hybrid Tess Harding in The WB's teen television series, Roswell (2000–2002). She landed this role one month after moving to Los Angeles at the age of 18. E! Online described Roswell as "one of the first shows to develop a passionate and engaged online fanbase, with active fan sites, message boards and even campaigns that helped save the show from cancellation—twice."

In 2004, de Ravin was cast to portray Claire Littleton on the ABC drama series Lost. Speaking about the success of Lost, she said: "It's sort of hard to say. You read something and have a good feeling about it, it sounds great, ties nicely together and then shooting something, editing it, the music, the actors involved, everything sort of plays a huge part. Everyone involved had a great feeling towards it, but you never really know." De Ravin's character Claire is introduced in the pilot episode as a pregnant plane crash survivor. She is a series regular until her disappearance in the fourth season finale. The character returned as a regular in the sixth season. Lost has regularly been ranked by critics as one of the greatest television series of all time. The first season had an estimated average of 16 million viewers per episode on ABC, while the final season averaged over 11 million U.S. viewers per episode.

In 2005, de Ravin was cast to portray Emily Kostich, the heroin-addicted ex-girlfriend of Brendan Frye (Joseph Gordon-Levitt), in the neo-noir film Brick. In an interview about the film, de Ravin told that she was attracted by the script because it was original and the teens in the film are very deep and emotional for their age.

A year later, de Ravin had a lead role and was cast as Brenda Carter in the remake of The Hills Have Eyes. The film performed well at the box office. In 2007, Variety reported that she would be starring in the film Ball Don't Lie, which premiered at the 2008 Tribeca Film Festival, which arrived in cinemas early 2009. De Ravin appeared in William Dear's The Perfect Game, and appeared in the 2009 film Public Enemies as a bank teller named Barbara Patzke.

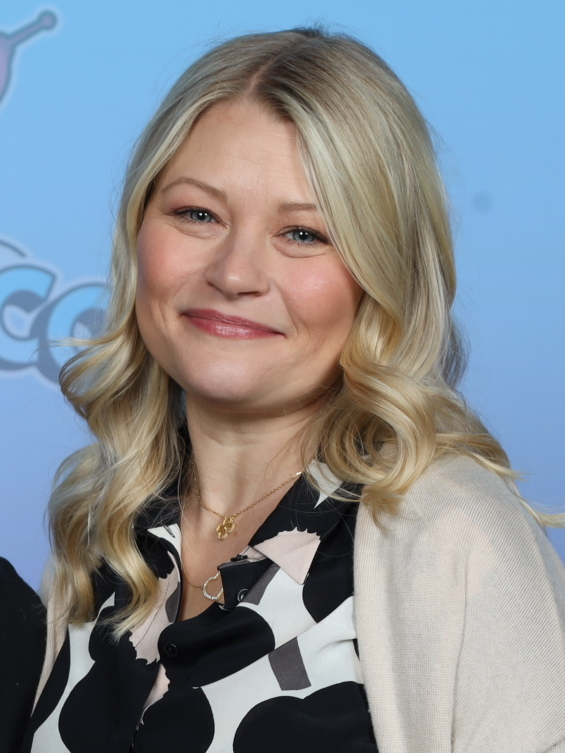
Emilie de Ravin at GalaxyCon Columbus in 2023

De Ravin was cast in the movie adaption of the video game Onimusha, but due to producer Samuel Hadida's other project The Imaginarium of Doctor Parnassus, and star Heath Ledger's death, Hadida was forced to push back the release date of the film. Onimusha was postponed for an unknown amount of time and eventually cancelled; there was not any confirmation if de Ravin would continue the project. She portrayed Alyssa "Ally" Craig in the romantic drama film Remember Me (2010) opposite Robert Pattinson. The film received its wide release on 12 March 2010. Remember Me accumulated $56 million at the worldwide box office.

In 2012, she guest-starred as Belle on the ABC fantasy drama, Once Upon a Time. After sporadic appearances in the first season, she was promoted to a series regular in the second. In May 2017, it was announced that de Ravin would be departing the series after six seasons along with her co-stars Ginnifer Goodwin, Josh Dallas, Jared S. Gilmore and Rebecca Mader. Two months later, it was reported that de Ravin would be guest-starring in at least one episode of the series's seventh season. That episode turned out to be the season's fourth, "Beauty". De Ravin also returned as Belle for the series finale, "Leaving Storybrooke".

She was to star as Anthony LaPaglia's character's daughter in the new drama series Americana in 2012, but ABC passed on the pilot. She starred in the 2015 indie film The Submarine Kid.

== Public image ==
During her career, de Ravin has appeared on the covers of numerous international fashion magazines, including US' Entertainment Weekly, FHM, InStyle Weddings, 944, Life, Where, LA Baby and Giant; Finland's Demi_{;} Belgium's Ciné Télé Revue; Australia's Sunday and People; and UK's Fabric. She has also modeled for CosmoGirl, Stuff and BPM Culture. She has appeared in advertising campaigns for department store chain JCPenney and clothing brand Hanes. De Ravin has been included on Maxim's Hot 100 list three times: in 2005 (No. 47), 2006 (No. 65), and 2008 (No. 68).

== Personal life ==
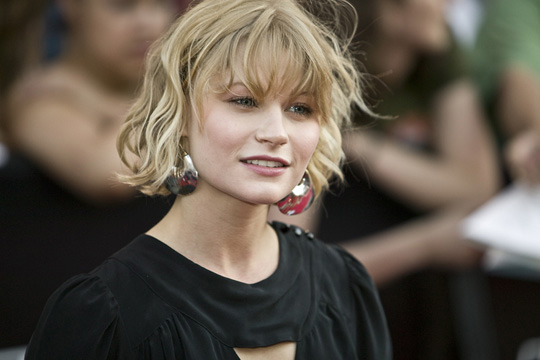
De Ravin attending the 2007 MuchMusic Video Awards

After three years of dating, actor Josh Janowicz proposed to de Ravin on New Year's Day 2003 in Melbourne, which she said "was very impromptu and very sweet". She met Janowicz in Los Angeles, and said that "our life together always comes before work. You can't buy love or family." While filming Lost, de Ravin flew to and from Hawaii "once or twice a week" to return to her home in Burbank, California, which she shared with Janowicz and their poodle.

The couple married 19 June 2003 in Melbourne, Australia. They separated six months after they married, and then reconciled. In June 2009, it was reported that they were living separately and had filed for divorce. In October 2009, she called off the divorce after a trip to Japan with her husband.

On 8 July 2014, de Ravin filed for divorce from Janowicz. According to court documents, the pair wed on 19 June 2003, despite their wedding ceremony on 26 June 2006; the documents further confirm that the couple separated on 1 November 2013.

In 2014, de Ravin began a relationship with American writer-director Eric Bilitch. The two announced their engagement on 6 July 2016. They have three children: two daughters, born in March 2016 and August 2023, and a son born in December 2018.

== Filmography ==
=== Film ===
Year	Film	Role	Notes
2005	Brick	Emily	
2005	Santa's Slay	Mary "Mac" Mackenzie	
2006	The Hills Have Eyes	Brenda Carter	
2008	Ball Don't Lie	Baby	
2009	The Perfect Game	Frankie Stevens	
2009	High Noon	Lt. Phoebe McNamara	
2009	Public Enemies	Barbara Patzke	
2010	Remember Me	Alyssa "Ally" Craig	
2010	The Chameleon	Kathy Jansen	
2010	Operation: Endgame	Hierophant	
2012	Love and Other Troubles	Sara	
2015	The Submarine Kid	Alice	
2024	Getting Lost	Herself	
TBA	Wreckage	Alex Molina	Pre-production

=== Television ===
Year	Title	Role	Notes
1999–2000	BeastMaster	The Demon Curupira	Recurring role (seasons 1–2), 8 episodes
2000–2002	Roswell	Tess Harding	Recurring role (season 1); main role (season 2); guest role (season 3)
2002	Carrie	Chris Hargensen	Television film
2003	NCIS	Nancy	Episode: "Seadog"
2003–2004	The Handler	Gina	Episodes: "Dirty White Collar", "Acts of Congress"
2004–2008 & 2010	Lost	Claire Littleton	Main cast (seasons 1–4 & 6); 97 episodes
2004	CSI: Miami	Venus Robinson	Episode: "Legal"
2009	High Noon	Lt. Phoebe McNamara	Television film
2012	Americana	Francesca Soulter	Unsold TV pilot
2012–2018	Once Upon a Time	Belle	Recurring role (season 1); main role (seasons 2–6); guest role (season 7); 118 episodes
2013	Hollywood Game Night	Herself	Panelist; episode: "Portrait of a Killer Party"
2013	Air Force One Is Down	Francesca Romero	Miniseries
2019	A Lover Scorned	Brooke	Television film
2022	True Colours	Liz Hindmarsh	
2025	The Reluctant Royal	Prudence	Hallmark movie

=== Video game ===
Year	Title	Role
2008	Lost: Via Domus	Claire Littleton
