= Meghan Ory =

Canadian television and film actress (born 1982)

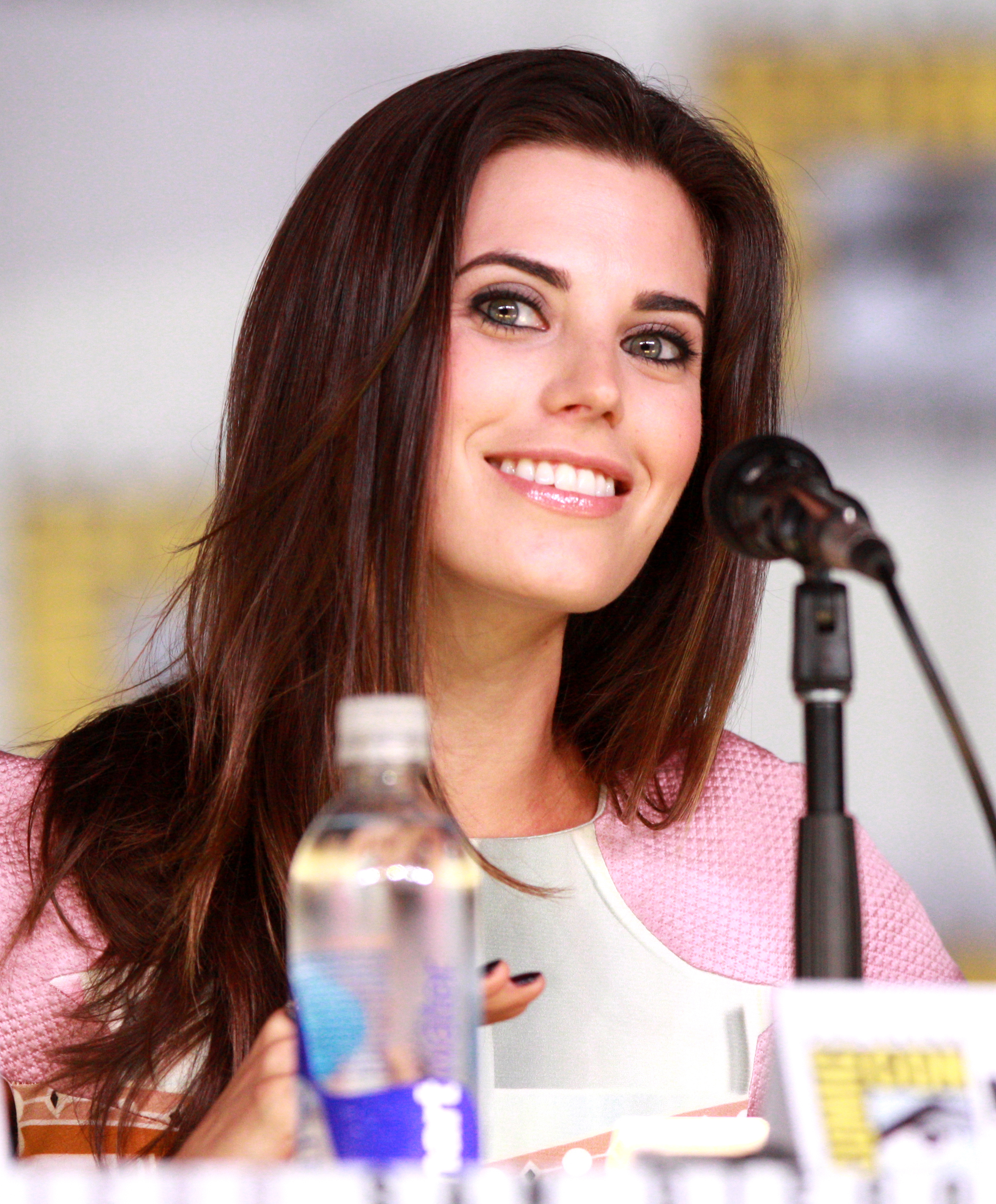
- Ory in 2013
- Born: August 20, 1982 (age 44); Victoria, British Columbia, Canada
- Occupation: Actress
- Years active: 1999–present
- Spouse: John Reardon (m. 2008)
- Children: 3

Meghan Ory (born August 20, 1982) is a Canadian-American television and film actress. She is known for her role as Red Riding Hood/Ruby on the ABC fantasy series Once Upon a Time and also starred in the short-lived CBS drama Intelligence as Riley Neal. Ory starred in the Hallmark family drama Chesapeake Shores as New York City careerwoman Abby O'Brien.

== Career ==
She was born in Victoria, British Columbia. She started acting in theater before her teens, but her mother forbade her from taking roles in film and television in order to be able to pay for her head shots.

Her first professional acting role came in 1999 in the Fox Family Channel television movie, The Darklings, opposite Suzanne Somers and Timothy Busfield. A guest appearance on the television series The Crow: Stairway to Heaven followed, before she landed her first regular TV role on the Fox Family series Higher Ground in 2000, along with Hayden Christensen and A.J. Cook. After appearing on the MTV series 2ge+her (2000), Ory joined the cast of the Canadian television series Vampire High in 2001.

She continued working in television with guest appearances on The Outer Limits, Dark Angel, Glory Days, and Maybe It’s Me. She appeared in the TV movies Lucky 7 and National Lampoon's Thanksgiving Family Reunion in 2003, as well as the TV series Smallville, Life As We Know It, and The Collector, and Family Reunion in 2004. Also in 2004, Ory made her feature film debut in Decoys, directed by Matthew Hastings, with whom she had previously worked on Higher Ground and Vampire High.

In 2006, Ory appeared in UPN series South Beach, and the Hallmark mini-series Merlin's Apprentice, alongside Sam Neill and Miranda Richardson. She also appeared in the feature film John Tucker Must Die and the made-for-TV film Her Sister's Keeper. In 2007, Ory appeared in Blonde and Blonder with Pamela Anderson and Denise Richards, and the television film Nightmare. In 2008, Ory appeared in the television series Flash Gordon episode "Thicker Than Water". In 2009, Ory appeared in the television series Knight Rider (2008) episode 17 (Season 1) "I love the Knight Life" as Megan Connelly. She portrayed Claire Thompson in the horror-thriller film Dark House. She also appeared as a guest star of Canadian TV Series Sanctuary as Laura. In 2010, Ory appeared in the Keystone Light beer commercial "Rescue of Beer."

Beginning fall 2011, Ory starred as Red Riding Hood/Ruby on the ABC fantasy series Once Upon a Time. She was in most of the episodes of the first season and was promoted to the main cast in the second season of the series. She left the cast at the end of the second season, to focus on her new show Intelligence, but made guest appearances in four episodes during the third season. Ory also returned to the show during its fifth season for three episodes.

In March 2013, Ory was cast as the female lead opposite Josh Holloway in the CBS drama pilot Intelligence, which co-stars Marg Helgenberger. The show was cancelled after one season due to poor ratings.

In the 2016 Hallmark original series Chesapeake Shores, she stars as a divorced career woman with two young daughters who returns to her hometown.

== Personal life ==
In 2008, she married actor John Reardon, with whom she had worked on Merlin's Apprentice. In May 2018, Ory announced that their first child, a son, had been born. In October 2019, Ory announced the birth of their second child, a girl. In January 2023, Ory revealed that she had given birth to their third child.

She currently resides in Newfoundland, Canada and is a dual citizen of Canada and the United States.

== Filmography ==
Film roles
| Year | Title | Role | Notes |
|---|---|---|---|
| 2004 | Decoys | Alex | |
| 2006 | John Tucker Must Die | Jill | |
| 2008 | Blonde and Blonder | Kit | |
| 2009 | Dark House | Claire | |
| 2015 | Dead Rising: Watchtower | Crystal O'Rourke | Direct-to-video film |

Television roles
| Year | Title | Role | Notes |
|---|---|---|---|
| 1999 | The Darklings | Jessie Everett | Television film (Fox Family) |
| 1999 | The Crow: Stairway to Heaven | Alice Romano | Episode: "The Road Not Taken" |
| 1999 | Popular | Jessie Everett | Television Series, Main Role |
| 2000 | Higher Ground | Juliette Waybourne | Main role |
| 2000 | 2gether: The Series | Heather | Episode: "Crying" |
| 2000 | Hayley Wagner, Star | Caitlin Curren | Television film |
| 2001 | The Outer Limits | Danielle Hobson | Episode: "Abduction" |
| 2001–2002 | Maybe It's Me | Lauren | 3 episodes |
| 2001–2002 | Vampire High | Sherry Woods | Main role |
| 2002 | Maybe It's Me | Lauren | Episode: "The Lab Partner Episode" |
| 2002 | Dark Angel | Rachel Berrisford | Episode: "The Berrisford Agenda" |
| 2002 | Glory Days | Jade LaFayette / Ann Palmer | Episode: "The Lost Girls" |
| 2002 | Just Cause | Tracey | Episode: "The Last to Know" |
| 2003 | Lucky 7 | Janey | Television film (ABC Family) |
| 2003 | National Lampoon's Thanksgiving Family Reunion | Allison Snider | Television film (TBS) |
| 2004 | Smallville | Megan Calder | Episode: "Hereafter" |
| 2004 | Life as We Know It | Greta | Episode: "Family Hard-ships" |
| 2004 | The Collector | Katie | Episode: "The Ice Skater" |
| 2005 | The Collector | Shannon Conrad / Cora | Episode: "The Cowboy" |
| 2006 | South Beach | Maggie | Main role |
| 2006 | Merlin's Apprentice | Brianna | Television miniseries |
| 2006 | Her Sister's Keeper | Melissa Brennan | Television film (Lifetime) |
| 2007 | Viva Laughlin | Unknown | Episode: "1.5" |
| 2007 | Nightmare | Carla | Television film |
| 2007 | Painkiller Jane | Wanda | Episode: "Portraits of Lauren Gray" |
| 2007 | The Haunting of Sorority Row | Amanda | Television film (Lifetime Movies) |
| 2008 | Flash Gordon | Sarre | Episode: "Thicker Than Water" |
| 2009 | Knight Rider | Dr. Megan Connelly | Episode: "I Love the Knight Life" |
| 2009 | Sanctuary | Laura S. | Episode: "Sleepers" |
| 2010 | Psych | Josie | Episode: "Viagra Falls" |
| 2010–2011 | True Justice | Detective Juliet Sanders | Main role (season 1) |
| 2012 | Supernatural | Sally | Episode: "Adventures In Babysitting" |
| 2011–2018 | Once Upon a Time | Ruby / Red Riding Hood | Recurring role (seasons 1, 3, 5); main role (season 2) |
| 2014 | Intelligence | Riley Neal | Main role |
| 2014 | The Memory Book | Chloe | Television film (Hallmark) |
| 2015 | Debbie Macomber's Dashing Through the Snow | Ashley Jane Harrison | Television film (Hallmark Movies & Mysteries) |
| 2016–2022 | Chesapeake Shores | Abby O'Brien-Winters | Lead role |
| 2016 | NCIS: New Orleans | Assistant U.S. Attorney Hannah Lee | Episode: "Overdrive" |
| 2021–2022 | Hudson & Rex | Deputy Chief Adele Tennant | 2 episodes (Season 4) |
| 2023 | The Secret Gift of Christmas | Bonnie Parker | Television film (Hallmark) |
| 2024 | Sullivan's Crossing | Sedona Jones | 4 episodes (Season 2) |
| 2024 | Believe in Christmas | Beatrice | Television film (Hallmark) |
| 2025 | A Christmas Angel Match | Monica | Television film (Hallmark); also writer |
