= Witch Hunt (Once Upon a Time) =

- Once Upon a Time episode
- Episode no.: Season 3 Episode 13
- Directed by: Guy Ferland
- Written by: Jane Espenson
- Production code: 313
- Original air date: March 16, 2014

Guest appearances
- Rebecca Mader as Zelena/Wicked Witch; Lee Arenberg as Leroy/Grumpy; Beverley Elliott as Widow Lucas/Granny; David-Paul Grove as Doc; Gabe Khouth as Mr. Clark/Sneezy; Faustino Di Bauda as Sleepy; Jeffrey Kaiser as Dopey; Michael Coleman as Happy; Mig Macario as Bashful; Sean Maguire as Robin Hood; Michael P. Northey as Friar Tuck; Jason Burkhart as Little John; David Anders as Dr. Whale; Meghan Ory as Ruby/Red Riding Hood; Raphael Sbarge as Archie Hopper; Raphael Alejandro as Roland; Nesta Chapman as Nurse #1

Episode chronology
← Previous "New York City Serenade"	Next → "The Tower"
- Once Upon a Time (season 3)

"Witch Hunt" is the thirteenth episode of the third season of the American fantasy drama series Once Upon a Time, and the show's 57th episode overall, which aired on March 16, 2014.

In this episode, Emma Swan arrives in Storybrooke with Henry, only to discover that no one remembers how they were transported back – or the past year they had spent back in fairy tale land. Emma teams up with Regina in an attempt to uncover who created the new curse. Meanwhile, in the fairy tale land that was during the past year, Regina, with the aid of Robin Hood, attempts to break into her castle, which has been overtaken by the Wicked Witch. The episode also marked the return of Mr. Gold/Rumplestiltskin (Robert Carlyle) who was believed to be deceased after he sacrificed himself in the mid-season finale in December 2013.

"Witch Hunt" received mostly positive reviews from critics, with many complimenting the improvement and progression in the story lines. Upon airing, the episode was watched by 7.75 million viewers, attaining an 18-49 rating of 2.4. This figure was an increase of 0.09 million viewers from the spring premiere the previous week, whilst identical in terms of 18-49 rating.

== Title card ==
The Wicked Witch of the West flies on her broomstick through the Enchanted Forest.

== Plot ==
=== In the Enchanted Forest ===
Back in The Enchanted Forest in the past year, the characters are walking through the forest. Although Regina is still missing Henry, she also starts thinking a lot about the tunnels that run under the castle, which is interrupted by the arrival of a flying monkey that was sent by Zelena, who is planning to attack Regina. Regina uses her magic and turns it into a stuffed monkey, which she hands to Robin’s son Roland. Belle says she’s read about the only land that has winged monkeys, and believes that they might be from a place called Oz; and it is most likely that the one now occupying Regina's castle is none other than the Wicked Witch of the West, as she is the only one known to have such creatures under her employ, but a snarky Regina responds to that comment of who is doing the bidding or orders by saying “I don’t care if the lollypop guild is protecting her,” and she’s going to get in that castle by herself without any help. However, Robin decides he's going to tag along anyway as a way to thank Regina for saving Roland. Robin suspects that Regina still misses someone in her life, even after admitting to him that she does. In the tunnels under the castle, Regina explains she has to put out a fire in the courtyard that powers the spell, only to discover to find the door open when its supposed to be sealed with blood magic. The door leads to a crypt with the coffin of her mother, Cora. As they head to her drawer, Robin becomes suspicious when she take a vial out, then he starts pulling a bow on her.

It turns out that Regina is planning to put a sleeping spell on herself so Henry will find her one-day and embrace her again, after lowering the protection spell. Regina then freezes Robin so she can go through with it and does lower the protection spell, but just as she is about to take the spell, she is interrupted by Zelena, who then takes the potion pin from Regina and reveals to Regina that they both have one thing in common, besides magic and the fact that Rumplestiltskin trained them, that Cora is their mother and they are half-sisters. Zelena, who is furious that Cora gave Regina everything that she could never have, tells her younger sibling that she plans to take everything she had away from her as revenge. After Zelena flies off on her broom, Regina returns to the crypt and unfreezes Robin, where she tells him that she now has something to live for: someone to destroy.

=== In Storybrooke ===
In Storybrooke, Emma Swan and Captain Hook visit a very pregnant Mary Margaret and David at their home. Since everyone in town can not remember the previous year or how they came back to Storybrooke, Hook tells Mary Margaret he was with them for a short while in the Enchanted Forest the year before, then he left. While he was sailing, a bird brought him a note and the memory potion to inform him about what had happened and he thought Snow sent it. Leroy then arrives and announces that another dwarf is missing and the possibility that Neal might be also missing, so Emma decides they have to get their memories back, by figuring out who took them.

Meanwhile, over at Granny's, Ruby brings Henry cocoa with cinnamon when Emma arrives with David and Mary Margaret and passes them off as friends from Phoenix. When Regina sees Henry, she freaks out. Emma then approaches Regina to try to figure out how to find the person who cast the new curse that bought everyone back to Storybrooke. Around the same time, Little John, who, along with the merry men, are unsuccessfully turkey hunting, is snatched by a flying monkey. The disappearance prompts Emma, Hook, and David to investigate, leading them to the city limits where he was last seen. After Emma leaves, Hook and David search the area and find a mauled Little John in the forest and is taken to the hospital. After they arrived at the hospital, Little John goes into convulsions and is transformed into a flying monkey, and makes an escape into the forest.

Later on at the town hall meeting, Emma and Regina start an argument over who created the new curse (as the entire town is blaming Regina). She denies it and says she would have kept Henry, but Emma doesn't believe her. A furious Regina then disappears. A red-headed women with a green pendant looks suspicious. It is later revealed that back in the Mayor's office that Emma and Regina staged this performance together in an effort to distract the townspeople while they seek out the real source of the curse. It also turns out that Regina is trying to replicate the memory potion to get everyone's year-long memories back, but the chemistry experiment fails, so Emma suggests using an old bail bonds trick to expose the person by announcing that they have a memory potion almost done. Back at the cafe, Mary Margaret is freaking herself out reading a baby book, when a woman approaches and tells her that “cradle cap” goes away. She tells Mary Margaret that hasn’t been in Storybrooke long, saying that she wasn't anyone she’d remember back in The Enchanted Forest. “I was a midwife,” she says, and introduces herself to Mary Margaret as Zelena, who then feels Mary Margaret's stomach, hearing and feeling the unborn child, as if she had something planned in the works for The Charmings. Later that night, Leroy (under the premise that Emma gave him the message that she found Regina) makes the announcement about the potion and Zelena gets up and walks out. Around the same time, Regina and Emma stake out the Mayor's office, where after they bond over Henry, the two get the break they were looking for and as they attempt to capture the person, the caped individual that broke in the office suddenly disappears in a puff of green smoke.

Emma and Regina later return to the apartment, where Emma introduces Henry to Regina, but he doesn't remember her. David and Hook then arrive to tell the women about what happened to Little John. It appears that the missing residents are being turned into flying monkeys, and Regina believes that the only person who could be capable of doing this is The Wicked Witch of The West. Emma’s confused because they’re not in Kansas and is now learning that there is another character living among the residents. Unfortunately, at a farm house located outside Storybrooke, it is revealed that Zelena is actually The Wicked Witch of The West. She then brings a tray of food down into an underground cellar... where it is revealed that she is keeping a prisoner who has gone mad in a cage: Rumplestiltskin.

== Cultural references ==
- The farm house and cellar where Zelena resides resembles the farm house and cellar in the Wizard of Oz film.
- Another notable reference from the story included Emma alluding to the quote "I've a feeling we're not in Kansas anymore", made by Dorothy Gale, the main protagonist in the Oz series.
- After Little John is transformed into a flying monkey and flies off, Dr. Whale responds by saying "I'm a doctor, not a vet," echoing the catchphrase made famous by Dr. Leonard "Bones" McCoy from The Original Star Trek Series.
- "Zelena" means "green" in various Slavic languages.

== Reception ==
=== Ratings ===
The episode fared extremely well in ratings, placing a 2.4/7 among 18-49s with 7.75 million American viewers tuning in, up 0.09 million viewers from the spring premiere the previous week. The increase in viewers made a change to the typically decreasing figures earlier from each episode in the season.

=== Critical reception ===
The episode was met with mostly positive reviews, with many critics complimenting the improvement and progression in the story lines.

Amy Ratcliffe of IGN gave the episode a 9.2 out of 10, saying "Overall, the episode almost had too many "what?!" moments, but it worked. While I hope to see more of why the Wicked Witch is taking out her anger on Regina, we've seen enough to know she's interesting and that their battle has the potential to be game-changing."

Hillary Busis of Entertainment Weekly noted that "the plot only thickens when you throw in fan theories about how in Once's universe, the Dark One and the Wizard of Oz might end up being the same person. (Then again, Kitsis and Horowitz might want to stay away from such an obvious Wicked echo.)

Christine Orlado of TV Fanatic gave the episode 4.6 out of 5 stars.

Gwen Ihnat of The A.V. Club gave the episode a B, noting that "Once Upon A Time fares so much better when it assumes this kind of self-referential tone with its audience; we’re just as familiar with these stories as the characters on the show are, so we can all be in on the startling insights or unexpected plot twists or sometimes, it’s even just helpful to be in on the joke. At any rate, it’s a big leap forward, which almost didn’t even seem possible after 'New York City Serenade.'"
