= Once Upon a Time season 3 =

Once Upon a Time
- Season 3
- DVD cover
- Starring: Ginnifer Goodwin; Jennifer Morrison; Lana Parrilla; Josh Dallas; Emilie de Ravin; Colin O'Donoghue; Michael Raymond-James; Jared S. Gilmore; Robert Carlyle
- No. of episodes: 22

Release
- Original network: ABC
- Original release: September 29, 2013 – May 11, 2014

Season chronology
- ← Previous; Season 2 Next → Season 4

The third season of the American ABC fantasy-drama series Once Upon a Time was announced on May 10, 2013. It was split into two volumes, with the first airing from September 29 to December 15, 2013, and the second from March 9 to May 11, 2014. Ginnifer Goodwin, Jennifer Morrison, Lana Parrilla, Josh Dallas, Emilie de Ravin, Colin O'Donoghue, Jared S. Gilmore, and Robert Carlyle return as principal cast members from the previous season, and are joined by Michael Raymond-James in his only season as a regular.

The first volume's plot revolved around the main characters traveling to Neverland from Storybrooke to retrieve a kidnapped Henry Mills (Gilmore) from the possession of an evil Peter Pan. After successfully retrieving Henry, the characters returned to Storybrooke, only to be returned to their original worlds following Pan's attempt to cast a new curse, leaving Emma Swan (Morrison) and Henry to escape to New York City after Rumplestiltskin (Carlyle) killed Pan, revealed to be his father. The second volume's plot followed the characters' past journey in the Enchanted Forest and how they were brought back to Storybrooke by Zelena, the Wicked Witch of the West and Regina's half-sister, while also documenting Emma's mission to break the new curse and save her family.

Existing fictional characters introduced to the series during the season include the main antagonists of the two volumes, Peter Pan and the Wicked Witch of the West, alongside Tinker Bell, Ariel, Prince Eric, Ursula, Medusa, Rapunzel, Lumiere, the Wizard of Oz, Glinda the Good Witch, the Good Witch of the North, the Witch of the East, Dorothy Gale, and Blackbeard. The season ends with the introduction of Elsa, who would headline a story arc based on the 2013 film Frozen in the first half of the fourth season.

== Premise ==
After Henry is kidnapped, Emma, Regina, David, Mary Margaret, Mr. Gold, and Hook travel to Neverland to save him. While in Neverland, new allies are made such as Tinker Bell and the heroes attempt to defeat Peter Pan and the Lost Boys, who are trying to restore Neverland's magic with Henry's heart. Their time in Neverland results in Peter Pan returning with them to Storybrooke, where he unleashes Regina's original curse with hopes to make Storybrooke the new Neverland. As the heroes and Peter Pan collide, a sacrifice is made, with everyone returning to the Enchanted Forest except Emma and Henry. However, a year later, everyone is returned to Storybrooke via another curse as the Wicked Witch of the West has plans of her own. Emma and Henry are brought back to Storybrooke to help break the latest curse and defeat the Wicked Witch, which leads to a trip to the past with dire consequences.

== Cast and characters ==
=== Main ===
- Ginnifer Goodwin as Snow White / Mary Margaret Blanchard
- Jennifer Morrison as Emma Swan
- Lana Parrilla as Regina Mills / Evil Queen
- Josh Dallas as David Nolan / Prince Charming
- Emilie de Ravin as Belle French
- Colin O'Donoghue as Killian Jones / Captain Hook
- Michael Raymond-James as Baelfire / Neal Cassidy
- Jared S. Gilmore as Henry Mills
- Robert Carlyle as Rumplestiltskin / Mr. Gold

=== Recurring ===
- Beverley Elliott as Widow Lucas / Granny
- Sean Maguire as Robin Hood
- Robbie Kay as Malcolm / Peter Pan / Pied Piper
- Lee Arenberg as Dreamy / Grumpy / Leroy
- Gabe Khouth as Sneezy / Tom Clark
- Parker Croft as Felix
- Rebecca Mader as Zelena / Wicked Witch
- David Paul Grove as Doc
- Rose McIver as Tinker Bell
- Faustino Di Bauda as Sleepy / Walter
- Keegan Connor Tracy as Blue Fairy / Mother Superior
- Raphael Sbarge as Jiminy Cricket / Dr. Archie Hopper
- Mig Macario as Bashful
- Jeffrey Kaiser as Dopey
- Michael Coleman as Happy
- Sarah Bolger as Aurora
- JoAnna Garcia Swisher as Ariel
- Meghan Ory as Red Riding Hood / Ruby
- Freya Tingley as Wendy Darling
- Chris Gauthier as Mr. Smee
- David Anders as Dr. Victor Frankenstein / Dr. Whale
- Julian Morris as Prince Phillip
- Gil McKinney as Prince Eric
- Christopher Gorham as Walsh / Wizard of Oz
- James Immekus as Michael Darling
- Matt Kane as John Darling
- Jason Burkart as Little John
- Michael P. Northey as Friar Tuck

=== Guest ===
- Jamie Chung as Mulan
- Giancarlo Esposito as Sidney Glass / Magic Mirror
- Dylan Schmid as Young Baelfire
- Charles Mesure as Blackbeard
- Sunny Mabrey as Glinda / the Good Witch
- Stephen Lord as Malcolm
- Christie Laing as Marian
- Ethan Embry as Greg Mendell
- Sonequa Martin-Green as Tamara
- Bernard Curry as Liam Jones
- Skyler Gisondo as Devin
- Wyatt Oleff as Young Rumplestiltskin
- Marilyn Manson voices Peter Pan's Shadow
- Alexandra Metz as Rapunzel
- Henri Lubatti as Lumiere
- Rose McGowan as Cora
- David de Lautour as Jonathan
- Eric Lange as Prince Leopold
- Yvette Nicole Brown voices Ursula the Sea Goddess
- Matreya Scarrwener as Dorothy Gale
- Anastasia Griffith as Princess Abigail / Kathryn Nolan
- Tony Amendola as Geppetto / Marco
- Alex Zahara as King Midas
- Eric Keenleyside as Maurice / Moe French
- Jack di Blasio as a Lost Boy

== Episodes ==
No. overall	No. in season	Title	Directed by	Written by	Original release date	US viewers (millions)
45	1	"The Heart of the Truest Believer"	Ralph Hemecker	Edward Kitsis & Adam Horowitz	September 29, 2013	8.52
In Neverland, Henry befriends a fugitive boy who guides him around the jungle, informing him of the sinister Peter Pan and his Lost Boys. At the same time, Emma, her parents, Regina, Mr. Gold, and Hook successfully arrive in Neverland, and must face each other's differences to work together and retrieve a missing Henry, though Gold has other plans. Meanwhile, in the Enchanted Forest, a wounded Neal attempts to find a way to learn of Emma's whereabouts, with help from Aurora, Phillip, and Mulan.
46	2	"Lost Girl"	Ron Underwood	Andrew Chambliss & Kalinda Vazquez	October 6, 2013	8.00
Emma comes face to face with the evil Peter Pan, who begins his first game with the group to locate Henry that involves Emma facing her true identity. Meanwhile, Mr. Gold gets an unexpected visitor in the dark jungle who helps him with his troubling thoughts about his looming prophecy; Gold also is haunted by a mysterious straw doll that follows him everywhere. Back in the Enchanted Forest that was, the Evil Queen Regina threatens to remove Snow White from her kingdom in order to adhere to the throne herself.
47	3	"Quite a Common Fairy"	Alex Zakrzewski	Jane Espenson	October 13, 2013	7.53
Peter Pan begins to reveal to Henry the real reason why he was brought to Neverland, while his family begin to realize that Pan is tricking them. Meanwhile, in the Enchanted Forest, Neal enlists Robin Hood, his son, and Mulan to get to Neverland. In the characters' pasts, Regina begins to grow tired of her loveless marriage, and ends up attracting the attention of a rebellious green fairy named Tinker Bell.
48	4	"Nasty Habits"	David Boyd	David H. Goodman & Robert Hull	October 20, 2013	7.05
Neal teams up with his father to find a way to retrieve Henry in the jungle, whilst also managing to settle their mistakes. But with Gold's constant struggle with his theories of the prophecy, Neal becomes suspicious of his father's true intentions. Elsewhere in the jungle, Emma and the group find an item of Neal's that could prove useful in finding an escape off of the island. Back in the Enchanted Forest that was, Bae disappears from Rumplestiltskin's strong view, leading him to the town of Hamelin where children are being reported missing by effect of a mysterious tune.
49	5	"Good Form"	Jon Amiel	Christine Boylan & Daniel T. Thomsen	October 27, 2013	7.23
Hook tries to save David when dreamshade poisoning takes a toil. Elsewhere, Snow and Regina work together to capture a lost boy so they can communicate with Henry. In flashbacks, Hook and his big brother go looking for a plant.
50	6	"Ariel"	Ciaran Donnelly	Edward Kitsis & Adam Horowitz	November 3, 2013	7.55
Learning that Neal is alive, Emma and the others enter Echo Cave to rescue him. Inside, they are forced to reveal their darkest secrets to one another. Regina separates from the group beforehand and meets up with Gold, saving him from Pan's shadow in disguise as Belle. Together, Regina and Gold devise a plan to defeat Pan and save Henry. Meanwhile, in the Enchanted Forest that was, Snow White is rescued from drowning by a mermaid named Ariel, and then helps Ariel meet her true love, Prince Eric.
51	7	"Dark Hollow"	Guy Ferland	Kalinda Vazquez & Andrew Chambliss	November 10, 2013	6.71
Emma, Neal and Hook travel to the darkest part of Neverland to capture Pan's shadow, but the mission is jeopardized by the men fighting over Emma's attention. Elsewhere on the island, Peter Pan steps up his game in manipulating Henry, using a captive Wendy Darling to do so. Meanwhile, Ariel is sent to Storybrooke by Mr. Gold and Regina to help Belle find Pandora's Box, an artifact powerful enough to defeat Pan.
52	8	"Think Lovely Thoughts"	David Solomon	David H. Goodman & Robert Hull	November 17, 2013	6.66
Emma's group reunites with Regina and Mr. Gold, and they learn from Wendy what Pan's true objectives are. If Henry willingly gives him his heart, then Pan will become immortal and Henry will die. Determined to prevent this, the group heads for Skull Rock to save Henry at last. Meanwhile, in the distant past, a young Rumplestiltskin is granted a second chance at a happy life with his wastrel father. But Rumplestiltskin's father has a different idea of a better future for himself…
53	9	"Save Henry"	Andy Goddard	Christine Boylan & Daniel T. Thomsen	December 1, 2013	6.64
Henry is dying, and Pan is slowly absorbing Henry's heart into his own. Emma, Mary Margaret, and Regina have no choice but to attack Pan head-on, but this will not be a task easily accomplished. Meanwhile, 11 years ago, Regina finds a way to adopt the infant Henry to be her son in Storybrooke.
54	10	"The New Neverland"	Ron Underwood	Andrew Chambliss	December 8, 2013	6.94
The group returns to Storybrooke in triumph, and it looks like they might have a chance at a peaceful life from now on. But things are not as they appear, and soon a great danger makes itself known. Meanwhile, in the Enchanted Forest that was, Prince Charming wants to enjoy a honeymoon with his new wife, but Snow White is too distraught over the Evil Queen's vow of revenge and seeks a way to do something about it.
55	11	"Going Home"	Ralph Hemecker	Edward Kitsis & Adam Horowitz	December 15, 2013	6.44
Pan is in Henry's body, and plans on casting the Dark Curse once and for all to create a new Neverland, as no one can age under it. Emma and the others try to stop this, but it may come with the ultimate sacrifice on everyone's part. In character's past, however, we learn of the many events that lead up to the unveiling of Emma's destiny.
56	12	"New York City Serenade"	Billy Gierhart	Edward Kitsis & Adam Horowitz	March 9, 2014	7.66
Emma and Henry have been living in New York for the past year, though they believe it's been ten. All this is changed when Captain Hook comes knocking at their door, telling Emma that she is needed in a town she has forgotten, and a year ago in the Enchanted Forest, the fairy tale characters try to rebuild their home, but find that none other than the Wicked Witch of the West is in charge now.
57	13	"Witch Hunt"	Guy Ferland	Jane Espenson	March 16, 2014	7.75
With her memory restored, Emma and Henry have come back to Storybrooke to help Regina and the others find out who has recast the Dark Curse. Mary Margaret is also pregnant, and her midwife is none other than the Wicked Witch, Zelena. In the forgotten year, Regina discovers an unexpected connection with the Wicked Witch.
58	14	"The Tower"	Ralph Hemecker	Robert Hull	March 23, 2014	6.91
While looking for the identity of the Wicked Witch, Charming finds that he is being pursued by a hooded figure. This may be the same hooded figure he encountered in the forgotten year, when he found a tower in the middle of the forest as the inheritance of the long-haired Rapunzel.
59	15	"Quiet Minds"	Eagle Egilsson	Kalinda Vazquez	March 30, 2014	6.64
In the forgotten year, Baelfire and Belle find a candlestick holder named Lumiere, who may be the key to helping them restore Rumplestiltskin back to life. In present day Storybrooke, Rumplestiltskin is a slave to Zelena, who has the dark one's dagger. Neal is also found, but something is wrong with him that even he doesn't understand. Also, Regina meets Robin Hood and is startled when she sees his lion tattoo. Emma and David found out Rumplestiltskin who's looking crazy in the forest of Storybrooke. Later, they find out that Rumple has absorbed Neal to save him. Neal sacrificed himself to separate his father from his body, so that his father can tell the savior who the Wicked Witch really is. In sorrow, Rumple told Emma that the Wicked Witch is Zelena. Emma and David go back to Mary Margaret and tell her about Zelena, whom she's thinking would help her when she gives birth to her child. They find her, but didn't find out where she had been. She was in the forest giving orders to Rumple to get back into the cage where she keeps him.
60	16	"It's Not Easy Being Green"	Mario Van Peebles	Andrew Chambliss	April 6, 2014	7.26
With Zelena's identity as the Wicked Witch of the West revealed, she challenges her half-sister Regina to a duel in the town square. Meanwhile, many years ago, a young Zelena tries to find her place in the world. With advice and some silver slippers from the Wizard of Oz, she goes to the Enchanted Forest, in order to be trained in sorcery by none other than Rumplestiltskin.
61	17	"The Jolly Roger"	Ernest Dickerson	David H. Goodman	April 13, 2014	6.50
Ariel returns to Storybrooke and asks Hook to help her find Prince Eric, who never returned to the town when the new curse was cast. Emma agrees to let Regina teach her how to use magic so that she can help defeat Zelena, and Mary Margaret and David try to prove that they can be just as much fun as Hook is with Henry. Meanwhile, in the Enchanted Forest during the past year, an angry Ariel confronts Hook over her missing Prince Eric, who she assumes was kidnapped and possibly killed by the pirate. But when Hook confesses that the Jolly Roger has been stolen, Ariel unknowingly provides him with a clue as to who the other pirate is, and Hook with Ariel go off in search of his ship.
62	18	"Bleeding Through"	Romeo Tirone	Jane Espenson & Daniel T. Thomsen	April 20, 2014	5.95
Zelena steals Regina's heart, so Regina enacts a spell to speak to her dead mother, Cora, to discover the truth about her and Zelena's past. Belle tries to figure out what Zelena's ultimate end game is. Meanwhile, in the Fairytale Land, young Cora is fooled by a man who claims being a prince and finds herself alone and pregnant. A chance meeting with a real prince will lead Cora to the royal life she's always craved, but she must keep her pregnancy a secret or risk losing everything.
63	19	"A Curious Thing"	Ralph Hemecker	Edward Kitsis & Adam Horowitz	April 27, 2014	7.34
Zelena threatens to kill Henry if Hook doesn't kiss Emma, and things begin to heat up between Regina and Robin Hood. Meanwhile, back in the Enchanted Forest, Snow and Charming go in search of Glinda, the Good Witch of the South, to see if she can help them defeat Zelena. It is also revealed who cast the curse that ultimately sent the Fairy Tale characters back to Storybrooke.
64	20	"Kansas"	Gwyneth Horder-Payton	Andrew Chambliss & Kalinda Vazquez	May 4, 2014	6.86
All of the residents of Storybrooke try to prevent Zelena from getting Snow's newborn baby, which is very close to arriving, because Zelena plans to use the baby to travel back in time and rewrite her destiny, while obliterating Regina and Snow White's family from existence. In the past of the land of Oz, Glinda tries to convince Zelena to fight the evil within her, and to join her and her sisters, the other good witches who protect Oz. Additionally, a young girl from Kansas is introduced who threatens to be Zelena's undoing, and ultimately factors into Zelena's final decision.
65	21	"Snow Drifts"	Ron Underwood	David H. Goodman & Robert Hull	May 11, 2014	6.80
Everyone in Storybrooke joins Mary Margaret and David as they prepare to celebrate the birth of their newborn son. The time-travel portal that Zelena prepared before her apparent demise is reactivated, and takes Emma and Hook back to the Enchanted Forest before the original curse. Attempting to return to their original time, they accidentally ruin Snow and Charming's first meeting, and they must repair the timeline with Rumplestiltskin's help. Emma and Hook's plan takes a turn for the worse when Regina captures Emma for "aiding" Snow, and Snow is unable to steal Charming's marriage ring.
66	22	"There's No Place Like Home"	Ralph Hemecker	Edward Kitsis & Adam Horowitz	May 11, 2014	6.80
Snow, Charming, Hook, and Red work together to rescue Emma from Regina's prison cell. Snow is captured and seemingly burned at the stake by Regina, though she manages to escape. Emma and Hook eventually get Snow and Charming together and repair the timeline. Embracing Storybrooke as her home, Emma is able to regain her magic and reopen the time portal to return to the present, bringing Maid Marian to Storybrooke in the process and inadvertently throwing a wrench in Regina and Robin Hood's relationship. Unbeknownst to Emma and Hook, they have also brought with them a woman with ice powers.

== Production ==
=== Development ===
On May 10, 2013, ABC renewed Once Upon a Time for a third season, which premiered on September 29. The same month, it was revealed that the season will feature crossover episodes connecting with the upcoming spin-off series Once Upon a Time in Wonderland. On August 4, it was announced that the season would be split into two parts, with the first eleven episodes premiering from September 29 to December 2013, while the second half would broadcast from March 9 to May 2014.

The first eleven episodes were set primarily in Neverland; co-creators Adam Horowitz and Edward Kitsis spoke about the setting of the third season stating, "Neverland is a land of belief, a land of imagination, and a land where all our main characters are being stripped down to their core. It's really allowing us, as writers, to dig deep into who they are and to push them forward to new places. I think being in Neverland is going to have a profound effect on each of the characters. It's really fun to see these characters and dig deep this year and explore what it's like for Emma to [be with] her parents. Neverland is really a place where we can sit down and think about that." The two also noted that Peter Pan will feature in the season but will be a more "complicated" version of the character, with Kitsis saying, "We have not yet met Peter Pan and we have not yet seen Neverland, and that is where we're going!" In a further interview, Horowitz stated, "Well for us, Neverland is kind of a place that makes you confront your past. It's sort of the heart of darkness and to be a 200-year-old person, you know because you don't grow up there, you have to keep yourself amused. However long Peter Pan has been there and for whatever reason he has been there, we intend to reveal our take on that and on the legend of Peter Pan. We have a way that it intertwines with our Once Upon a Time mythology that we're really excited to unveil". At Disney's D23 Expo event, the creators hinted at romantic sparks between Emma Swan and Captain Hook, and revelations about how Hook became a pirate. On March 10, 2014, the producers revealed that they may look ahead at incorporating characters from the films The Princess and the Frog, Brave, and Frozen in future episodes, possibly towards the end of the third season if they get the green light from Disney. Later that month, it was announced that the season finale will air on May 11, 2014, and have a duration of two hours.

=== Casting ===
The primary characters of the third season. From left to right: Belle/Lacey, Rumplestiltskin/Mr. Gold, Prince Charming/David Nolan, Baelfire/Neal Cassidy, Snow White/Mary Margaret Blanchard, Henry Mills, Emma Swan, Regina Mills/The Evil Queen, and Captain Killian "Hook" Jones.

In May 2013, it was revealed that season two regular Meghan Ory would be departing the show to star in CBS's upcoming sci-fi drama Intelligence. However, Ory stated that she would still be open for more episodes on the show as a guest member. Ory later made appearances in episodes 12, 13, and the season finale. The same month, it was announced that Michael Raymond-James had been promoted from a recurring cast member to a series regular for the season. In July 2013, it was reported that Giancarlo Esposito would be returning as Magic Mirror/Sidney Glass following his absence from season two. In the same month, it was announced that the role of Robin Hood had been recast from Tom Ellis to Sean Maguire. British actor Robbie Kay played the role of Peter Pan, the villain for the first half of the season. On July 29, it was reported that Rose McIver had been cast as Tinker Bell. For episode five, Bernard Curry played a guest role as Captain Hook's brother Liam, while a member of the Lost Boys called Devin was portrayed by Skyler Gisondo. Joanna Garcia was later cast as Ariel. On September 3, 2013, Gil McKinney was cast in the recurring role of Prince Eric. On October 18, 2013, it was revealed that the American musician Marilyn Manson would voice the character of The Shadow. On October 21, British actor Stephen Lord was announced to be playing Rumplestiltskin's father, Malcolm. He featured in the eighth and eleventh episodes of the season.

For the second half of the season, Rebecca Mader was cast as the main villain, the Wicked Witch of the West Zelena. Alexandra Metz was later cast as Rapunzel. Rose McGowan returned as a young Cora for the season's eighteenth episode, while the introduction of a young King Leopold as a Prince played by Eric Lange, and the return of Princess Eva, played by Eva Bourne, was also featured. Charles Mesure was cast as Blackbeard in January 2014, to appear in one episode as an enemy of Captain Hook. In February 2014, a casting call was opened for an actress in her mid-to-late twenties to recur as Glinda the Good Witch, a role later landed with Sunny Mabrey.

After Once Upon a Time in Wonderland was canceled, it was reported that Michael Socha, who plays the Knave of Hearts in that series, was in talks to join the main cast in season four. In April 2014, it was confirmed that Michael Socha will become a regular for the following season.

=== Promotion ===
On September 12, 2013, ABC released the original cast promotional photos for the season. However, due to fan backlash, the photos were removed. Instead, new photos were promoted via social networking outlets with the tag-line '#SaveHenry'. The second half of the season used the tag-line "#WickedIsComing" for promotional pre-release and "#WickedVsEvil" for most of its run.

=== Filming ===
Set in Neverland, filming of the first half of season three was shot in a versatile set inside a Vancouver soundstage, re-dressed to represent up to twelve different tropical locales, including the camps of Peter Pan, Mr. Gold and the other residents of Storybrooke. The expensive set took a month to construct and was inspired by both Disney's animated Peter Pan movie and the Ewok village from Return of the Jedi. Foliage wrangler Sarah McCulloch spoke of the set-up saying, "It took us five days to assemble all the plants. We have 200 real plants that have to be watered and pruned every day and heated at night, 30 actual tree stumps and 450 fake branches" to which silk leaves were added. The Storybrooke scenes were again shot in Steveston, British Columbia, Canada.

== Ratings ==
Viewership and ratings per episode of Once Upon a Time season 3
No.	Title	Air date	Rating/share (18–49)	Viewers (millions)	DVR (18–49)	DVR viewers (millions)	Total (18–49)	Total viewers (millions)
1	"The Heart of the Truest Believer"	September 29, 2013	2.6/7	8.52	1.2	2.54	3.8	11.06
2	"Lost Girl"	October 6, 2013	2.6/7	8.00	1.2	2.43	3.8	10.43
3	"Quite a Common Fairy"	October 13, 2013	2.4/6	7.53	1.1	—N/a	3.5	—N/a
4	"Nasty Habits"	October 20, 2013	2.1/5	7.05	1.3	2.55	3.4	9.60
5	"Good Form"	October 27, 2013	2.2/6	7.23	1.2	—N/a	3.4	—N/a
6	"Ariel"	November 3, 2013	2.3/6	7.55	1.2	2.70	3.5	10.25
7	"Dark Hollow"	November 10, 2013	2.1/5	6.71	1.3	2.68	3.4	9.39
8	"Think Lovely Thoughts"	November 17, 2013	1.9/5	6.66	1.2	2.59	3.1	9.25
9	"Save Henry"	December 1, 2013	1.9/5	6.64	1.3	2.59	3.2	9.22
10	"The New Neverland"	December 8, 2013	2.1/5	6.94	1.1	2.44	3.3	9.38
11	"Going Home"	December 15, 2013	1.9/5	6.44	1.2	2.50	3.1	8.94
12	"New York City Serenade"	March 9, 2014	2.4/7	7.66	1.0	—N/a	3.4	—N/a
13	"Witch Hunt"	March 16, 2014	2.4/7	7.75	1.3	2.68	3.7	10.43
14	"The Tower"	March 23, 2014	2.1/6	6.91	1.2	2.62	3.3	9.53
15	"Quiet Minds"	March 30, 2014	2.1/6	6.64	1.1	2.56	3.2	9.21
16	"It's Not Easy Being Green"	April 6, 2014	2.4/6	7.26	1.1	2.45	3.5	9.71
17	"The Jolly Roger"	April 13, 2014	2.0/6	6.50	1.2	2.58	3.2	9.08
18	"Bleeding Through"	April 20, 2014	1.7/5	5.95	—N/a	—N/a	—N/a	—N/a
19	"A Curious Thing"	April 27, 2014	2.2/6	7.34	1.0	2.09	3.2	9.43
20	"Kansas"	May 4, 2014	2.1/6	6.86	1.1	2.32	3.2	9.19
21	"Snow Drifts"	May 11, 2014	2.3/7	6.80	1.2	2.59	3.5	9.39
22	"There's No Place Like Home"	May 11, 2014	2.3/7	6.80	1.2	2.59	3.5	9.39
