= It's Not Easy Being Green (Once Upon a Time) =

- Once Upon a Time episode
- Episode no.: Season 3 Episode 16
- Directed by: Mario Van Peebles
- Written by: Andrew Chambliss
- Production code: 316
- Original air date: April 6, 2014

Guest appearances
- Rebecca Mader as Zelena/Wicked Witch of the West; Sean Maguire as Robin Hood; Beverley Elliott as Granny; Keegan Connor Tracy as Blue Fairy/Mother Superior; David-Paul Grove as Doc; Gabe Khouth as Sneezy/Mr. Clark; Christopher Gorham as Walsh/Wizard of Oz; Rose McIver as Tinker Bell; Adrian Hough as The Woodcutter; Maria Marlow as The Woodcutter's wife; Rose McGowan as Young Cora

Episode chronology
← Previous "Quiet Minds"	Next → "The Jolly Roger"
- Once Upon a Time (season 3)

"It's Not Easy Being Green" is the sixteenth episode of the third season of the American fantasy drama series Once Upon a Time, and the show's 60th episode overall, which aired on April 6, 2014.

In this episode, with Rumplestiltskin as her slave, Zelena challenges Regina to a fight to the death and shocks the Evil Queen with the revelation of their familial connection, even while the town lays Neal to rest. Meanwhile, back in the past, in the land of Oz, a jealous Zelena asks the Wizard to send her to Enchanted Forest after discovering she has a sister, Regina, and that Rumplestiltskin is training her to become a powerful force to be reckoned with.

== Title card ==
Four fire geysers from The Wizard of Oz erupt in the Enchanted Forest.

== Plot ==
=== In the Characters' Past ===
While travelling down a road, a woodcutter and his wife notices a tornado coming. After it disappears, the two see a basket on the ground, discovering a baby girl inside. As they pick it up, a tree branch is about to fall on them but the baby makes it move out of the way, saving the couple. The woodcutter believes there is something that is not right about the baby, but his wife believes that she might be special and wants to keep the child, as they head for a place that is revealed to be the Emerald City of Oz. They keep the child, naming her Zelena.

Fast forward to the years before the first curse, as Zelena shaves her father perfectly until she gives him a bloody nick, leading him to reveal to her that she is not his daughter and is nothing but a "witch." Zelena, who then lashes out at him for being a drunk, decides to go to the Wizard to find out the truth about her past, where upon her entry into the chamber she finds a curtain that covers a shadowy Wizard. He then asks her to look into a visionary portal and she discovers her mother Cora abandoning Zelena because she couldn't give her the one thing she wanted: royalty. But as she continues to watch, the Wizard tells her that Cora would later groom her younger sister Regina for royalty and would be later trained in sorcery by Rumplestiltskin. Zelena is then given a pair of silver slippers by the Wizard. When she clicks her heels three times they will bring her wherever she wants to go, but in return he wants something of Rumplestiltskin's, and then cautions Zelena that her actions will make her green with envy. She then uses it to take her to the Enchanted Forest and Rumplestiltskin.

Zelena feels that with Rumplestiltskin teaching her, she now feels happy with him. Unfortunately, this would all change when he skips out on a feast that she made for him in order to continue teaching Regina, making her more envious than ever. This prompts her enter to Regina's bedroom to kill her with a blade, only to find out that she was tricked by Rumplestiltskin (disguised as Regina). Zelena discovers that she had failed his test because the curse demands giving up the thing you love most, and that was her love for Rumplestiltskin, who then responds "It's OK. I have that effect on women." She also discovers that Rumplestiltskin has already trained Regina to become powerful, and Zelena's throat turns green. Rumplestiltskin then tells Zelena that unless she can take him to a land without magic, Regina is the one for the job. Zelena says bitterly that she could have, thanks to her slippers, but tells him it's too late for that, since he had already chosen Regina. Then, Zelena tells Rumplestiltskin that the only way he could get the slippers from her was to kill her, only to teleport away when he tries to. She says "The next time, you will choose me." Using her slippers, she then returns to Oz.

Back in Oz, Zelena demands that the Wizard help her to travel back in time to stop Cora from abandoning her, but he claims that it's impossible, even for him. Suspicious, she uses her power to bring the curtain down. It turns out that the "Wizard" is none other than Walsh (Emma Swan's boyfriend and ex-fiance), a circus barker from Kansas. Walsh says he does not have magic, but he collects it. Zelena decides that she has no use for him, but what she could use is a trained circus animal. And after seeing a flying monkey poster, she drags Walsh and transforms him into the very first one, and uses him thereafter to do her bidding.

Zelena then uses the magic viewer in the floor to watch Rumplestilskin train Regina. She literally turns green with envy and becomes wicked as ever, vowing that by the time she is done with her plan, Regina would have never even been born.

=== In Storybrooke ===
At Neal/Baelfire's funeral, everyone takes turns at burying his casket, while back at the farm Zelena taunts Gold about losing his son. Later on at Granny's, Emma makes bulls eyes and scores perfectly while playing darts which Hook suspects is her way to exact revenge on Zelena. Hook then tells Emma that he wants to spend some time with Henry as way to make up for Neal's loss, and Emma lets Henry go with Hook. Meanwhile, Tinker Bell notices the crest on Robin Hood's arm and asks Regina if it's the man from her prophecy, which Regina confirms, but when Robin comes over to talk, Regina changes the subject. Unfortunately, this gathering at Granny's is interrupted by Zelena, who bursts into the diner to confront Regina. She tells her again that they are half-sisters and that Cora is their mother, then challenges her to a duel at sundown, demanding no interference whatsoever. Regina agrees to the challenge saying that “This isn’t the Wild West,” while Zelena counters with, “No, dear. It’s the Wicked West," and departs.

At the Vault, Regina finds a letter from Cora, affirming that Zelena is telling the truth. She is later tracked down by Robin, who, after pickpocketing it from her jacket, is allowed to read the letter. Regina learned that the letter about Rumplestilskin praising Cora's first-born was about Zelena and not her. Also, Regina tells Robin Hood that if Rumplestiltskin, the one who taught her everything she knew about magic, thinks that Zelena is more powerful than Regina (and Cora), she will have no chance of winning the fight. Meanwhile, as Mary Margaret, Emma, David, Tinker Bell, and Belle discuss how to stop Zelena, Belle thinks that she can get through to Gold without using his dagger. As a result, they head to the farmhouse, and as Belle runs down to the cellar to free Gold, Zelena appears from the background, dagger in hand. Belle runs back upstairs, with Gold warning the others that Zelena wants them to know that if they interfere, he will kill them. In the meantime, Hook is tasked with distracting Henry/keeping him safe, so he takes him down to the docks, looking at the sky with Hook's sextant. Henry gets suspicious about Hook after he says that he taught Neal when he was a boy, although they are the same age. Henry demands the truth. Hook then tells him Emma is trying to protect him, saying that Neal had just lost his father when he met him, and Henry has more in common with him than he realizes.

Later that night at Main Street, everyone gathers to see the sisters' showdown. Zelena shows up first and means business; she threatens to use Gold to kill anyone after five minutes if Regina doesn't come, and she proves it after Emma steps in by throwing her into her parents. Regina then finally steps up to battle, but not before slapping her older sister over the subject of their mother. Zelena responds by throwing her sister into a car; Regina counters by conjuring up a fire ball which Zelena extinguishes quickly. Zelena then throws Regina into the clock tower, and as Zelena flies up to take the one thing that she needs from Regina, The Evil Queen reveals she has known what it was all along, telling Zelena “Our mother taught me one thing. Never bring your heart to a witch fight.” (It turns out that Regina gave her heart to Robin Hood back at the forest for safekeeping prior to the battle). A furious Zelena tells Regina that she will find her heart, and also vows to destroy her, before flying off on her broom. As everyone races to check on Regina, Regina divulges that if Zelena has David's courage and is after Regina's heart, Zelena might have something big planned. And as it turns out, Zelena is indeed planning something that will change the courses of everyone involved, telling Gold back in his cage that what she is planning isn't a curse... but a second chance.

== Cultural references ==
- The episode title is a reference on "Bein' Green", a 1970 song made famous by Kermit the Frog, who was created and voiced by Jim Henson, whose Muppets properties are part of The Walt Disney Company. The Muppets had also starred in a made-for-TV version of The Wizard of Oz in 2005 aptly titled The Muppets' Wizard of Oz.
- The silver slippers Zelena wore in the episode are described as the same ones featured in the "Wizard of Oz" book.
- When Zelena successfully locates Rumpelstiltskin during her magic training, he says "ding dong," the beginning lyrics of the Munchkin's song "Ding Dong The Witch Is Dead" from The Wizard of Oz movie.
- According to the poster seen in this episode, Walsh's circus is called The Omaha Circus and Freak Show. In the novel "Wizard of Oz", Omaha was the name of the Wizard's birthplace.

== Reception ==
=== Ratings ===
The episode saw an increase over the previous outing, placing a 2.4/6 among 18-49s, with 7.24 million viewers, up from the previous episode.

=== Critical reception ===
The episode was met with positive reviews.

Hillary Busis of Entertainment Weekly gave it a good review: "'Once's' version of the Man Behind the Curtain emerged for the first time tonight. When he did, we learned that the guy in question is none other than... Benjamin Linus. Just kidding! It's Walsh, a.k.a. Christopher Gorham, a.k.a. the dude who would become Emma's flying monkey beau. This week's episode gave his truncated origin story -- but more than that, it delved into Zelena's past to shed a glowing green light on how she became such a cold-hearted witch in the first place. (Given how literal Once can be, I wouldn't be surprised to learn Zelena's ticker is literally encased in a layer of ice.)

Christine Orlado of TV Fanatic gave the episode 4.4 out of 5 stars.

Amy Ratcliffe of IGN gave the episode a 7.2 out of 10, saying that "This week's Once had too many over-the-top scenes, but Regina had some fantastic moments."

Gwen Ihnat of The A.V. Club gave the episode a B+, noting that "In OUAT’s current Oz journey, Rebecca Mader has been killing it every week as Zelena, our latest villain. It takes a special kind of screen chomping to effectively follow up a line like “This isn’t the wild west” from Regina with “No, dear…It’s the Wicked West.” The fairyback stories we’ve seen on this show can be hit or miss, but thanks to Mader and some effective CGI for once and even a nice ending twist, this Wicked-focused episode is the best OUAT outing we’ve seen in a while."
