= A Curious Thing (Once Upon a Time) =

- Once Upon a Time episode
- Episode no.: Season 3 Episode 19
- Directed by: Ralph Hemecker
- Written by: Edward Kitsis & Adam Horowitz
- Production code: 319
- Original air date: April 27, 2014

Guest appearances
- Rebecca Mader as Zelena/Wicked Witch of the West; Sean Maguire as Robin Hood; Lee Arenberg as Leroy; Sarah Bolger as Princess Aurora; Julian Morris as Prince Phillip; Sunny Mabrey as Glinda; Christopher Gauthier as Smee

Episode chronology
← Previous "Bleeding Through"	Next → "Kansas"
- Once Upon a Time (season 3)

"A Curious Thing" is the nineteenth episode of the third season of the American fantasy drama series Once Upon a Time, and the show's 63rd episode overall, which aired on April 27, 2014. The episode, written by series creators Edward Kitsis & Adam Horowitz and directed by Ralph Hemecker, was met with excellent reviews for its fast paced storyline in this outing.

In this episode Emma Swan, her parents, Regina Mills, and Captain Hook try to save Henry from Zelena, while flashbacks show Snow White, Prince Charming, and Regina cast the curse to save Snow's new baby.

== Title card ==
A flying monkey flies through the Enchanted Forest.

== Plot ==
=== In the Characters' Past ===
In the Enchanted Forest, during the second curse that brought everyone back, a hooded rider races off to the fortress. When the rider arrives, the hood is pulled off and it's Belle, who's ready to tell Regina, Snow, Charming, Phillip, and Aurora about what happened to Baelfire after he brought Rumplestiltskin back from the dead. Aurora reveals that Zelena threatened her and Phillip in order to get them to reveal when the others returned to the Enchanted Forest and that Zelena is planning to go after Snow and Charming's unborn baby. Just then, Zelena shows up on her broom and freezes everyone except Belle, and turns Aurora and Phillip into flying monkeys. She then checks the baby in Snow's womb and decides that it is exactly what she needs.

It's eight months later. At the War Room, Charming, with Snow, Regina, Robin Hood, and Belle discuss how to defeat Zelena. Regina asks what gave them a head start in defeating her and Snow says that Rumplestiltskin warned them. They decide that they have to talk to Rumple so Robin and Regina lead the team as they enter his castle, and discover that he is now in a cage and talking in riddles. When Belle takes his hand, Rumplestiltskin tells them that "The light magic of Glinda, the Good Witch of The South" will defeat the Wicked Witch of the West, but adds sing-song clues to the message ("through the door step inside if pure of heart then she won't hide") after Snow questions him. Later that night in the forest, the rescuers find a door that leads to nowhere, fitting the musical description that Rumplestiltskin gave them. Snow and Charming step through, but Regina cannot because her heart is "heavy with vengeance". On the other side of the door, Snow and Charming meet Glinda, who has heard of Snow and wanted to meet her. Glinda tells the couple that she isn't powerful enough to destroy Zelena, because she was once a friend. Glinda then tells Snow about a pendant that she gave Zelena and that all of Zelena's magic rests inside of it, but only someone with the most powerful light magic will be able to remove it. Snow realizes that Emma Swan is the only one who can do this, and, since Emma's not with them, the only way to defeat Zelena is to enact the dark curse to get back to Emma.

After the Charmings are reunited with Regina, they tell her that the only way to stop Zelena is to re-enact the dark curse. Regina explains that to do that, she would have to destroy the heart of what she loves the most. That means Henry, and is not an option; for apart from the fact that she won't sacrifice him, he is with Emma in our world. But Charming figures out that Snow can cast the curse and offers his heart, realizing the risk that he is taking to protect their unborn child. Before enacting the curse, Snow lovingly tells her husband: "I've loved you since the first moment I saw you," and Charming responds, "And I'll love you until my last." After they kiss goodbye, Regina proceeds to take Charming's heart and gives it to Snow, who then crushes it into the potion, while looking at Charming. Charming collapses to the ground and Snow holds his lifeless body. Zelena then appears, adding a forgetting potion to the curse so they won't remember how to defeat her, and she also adds that Snow will be too worried wondering where her husband is to worry about the witch. Then, Zelena tells Regina to pay close attention since that is "how you ruin a happy ending," before flying off on her broom. Snow realizes that when Charming said they were of one heart it could be meant literally, and so she asks Regina to split her heart in two and give half of it to Charming. At first Regina hesitates, as there is no guarantee that Snow will survive, but Snow convinces her to believe. Regina does as Snow asked, and seconds before the new curse consumes them, Charming is brought back to life.

With the new curse now enacted, Zelena takes a memory potion to remember the year that will be lost between the curse, then offers Rumplestiltskin a chance to remember his loss of Baelfire. She says he can do whatever he wants with the potion. Seeing this as a way to get revenge on Zelena, Rumplestiltskin is about to take the potion when Baelfire takes control and decides that now isn't the time for revenge and Emma needs to remember more than they do. Baelfire quickly sends a message and the bottle of potion to Hook by way of a dove before being reabsorbed into his father.

=== In Storybrooke ===
In Emma's room at the inn, Regina, Emma, David, and Mary Margaret wait for Hook as they discuss what to do. Regina (who just finished her romantic date with Robin Hood) decides that they need to break the curse and the way they did that before was Emma. They figure out that the missing component to breaking the curse is that Henry needs to believe. It's time to find the storybook, because that is what first made Henry start believing. Speaking of Killian Jones, it appears that the pirate has been taken hostage and placed in the trunk of Gold's Cadillac. When Gold opens it, Zelena tells him that he must kiss Emma, taking away her magic, or she'll start killing those she (Emma) loves, starting with Henry. Meanwhile, back at Granny's, Mary Margaret tells the others that she found the "Once Upon a Time" book in her closet during the first curse, prompting Regina to see if they can find the book again. When they try to leave to go find the book, Henry demands Emma tell him everything as he suspects that she has lied to him, but after she lies to him again by stating that she is his mother and she knows what's best for him, Henry asks if he can borrow her room keys, claiming that he lost his. Emma does not suspect Henry's true intention is to take the VW and escape Storybrooke by driving to the nearest bus station. He is stopped by Hook, who might have a solution to solving Emma and Henry's problems.

At the loft, they search through boxes and just when they are about to give up, Mary Margaret searches a box that Emma has just looked through and finds the book. This disappoints Emma as she wants to take Henry back to New York and she thinks him remembering will just make it harder for her.

Emma tracks Henry to the docks, where Henry confronts Hook and Smee to ask why they are helping him. The flying monkeys arrive to attack them and they take shelter at a storage building, where Hook tells Smee to take Henry to safety and fends off a pair of attackers. As Emma, Regina, Mary Margaret and David arrive at the docks, they also take out (with a combination of gun, sword, and magic) the additional flying monkeys that have shown up in force. Emma then asks Henry to believe in her and take the book, and when she gives it to him, Henry's memories come back. But just as Regina tells Emma to kiss Henry to break the curse, he disappears and reappears in Zelena's arms with her hands at his throat.

Regina attempts to stop her but Zelena throws her back with her power, knocking Regina out. Zelena says that Hook has failed her and she is about to kill Henry, but Emma uses her power to release Henry from Zelena's grip with a blaze of light. Zelena disappears, allowing him to escape. Henry worriedly shakes Regina and calls out to her but it takes her a while to come around. Regina promises Henry that she will never let him go again and, as she kisses him on the forehead, the curse breaks as the kiss is born from true motherly love. Emma then learns from Mary Margaret that back in the Enchanted Forest, it was she, not Zelena, that cast the new curse, but Emma, remembering the price of the curse, questions how that can be when Mary Margaret and David are still alive.

Hours later, Regina and Henry bond for the first time in a year and she introduces him to Robin Hood, whom Henry had witnessed her kissing. Meanwhile, Emma learns from Hook about the curse placed on his lips by Zelena. She tells him that she can no longer trust him because he didn't tell her the truth and let her decide how to protect Henry due to the fact that his decision almost got him killed, a sentiment agreed upon by Mary Margaret and David. As for the message that Hook received to bring Emma back to Storybrooke, Mary Margaret and David revealed that they never sent Hook a note or the memory potion he gave Emma, but Hook insists that he's not lying and someone must have sent them to him. At Neal's gravesite, Emma tells Henry, who now remembers his father, about Neal's being a hero, while Mary Margaret and David look on. Suddenly, Mary Margaret goes into labor.

== Reception ==
=== Ratings ===
The episode saw a huge jump in ratings from the previous outing and winning its timeslot for the third week in a row, posting a 2.2/6 among 18-49s with 7.34 million viewers tuning in.

=== Critical reception ===
The episode was met with positive to excellent reviews.

Hillary Busis of Entertainment Weekly gave it a great review: "Darnit. Why'd I have to go and waste a perfectly good heart title on last week's recap when it would have made much more sense for tonight's episode? Make that tonight's awesome episode. "A Curious Thing" had just about everything—smooching, flying monkeys, curses on curses on curses, more forward momentum than the entire Neverland arc. And that's without even counting the hour's various emotional peaks, all of them heart-tuggers (there's that organ again) -- even if some of those feelings were immediately negated by what happened next. This is what Once should be: a fast-paced thrill ride boosted by the occasional wisecrack and only marred a tiny bit by relative implausibility. (Wait—didn't it take Rump, like, centuries to finally produce the first Dark Curse? How'd Snow, Charming, and Regina manage to recreate it in about 15 minutes?)"

Christine Orlado of TV Fanatic gave the episode 4.7 out of 5 stars, praising the fast pace throughout the episode.

Amy Ratcliffe of IGN gave it a 9.4, saying that "This week's Once introduced the Good Witch and took a surprising and satisfying turn in one of its best episodes."

Gwen Ihnat of The A.V. Club gave the episode a B+, noting that "As we slog through Once Upon A Time every week, occasionally we are rewarded with episodes like this one. What with OUAT’s frequent off-pacing, it seemed like enough events happened in “A Curious Thing” to fill a few episodes, but so many annoying questions this Oz half-season were cleared up. It was just so satisfying."
