= Quiet Minds =

- Once Upon a Time episode
- Episode no.: Season 3 Episode 15
- Directed by: Eagle Egilsson
- Written by: Kalinda Vazquez
- Production code: 315
- Original air date: March 30, 2014

Guest appearances
- Rebecca Mader as Zelena/Wicked Witch; Sean Maguire as Robin Hood; Beverley Elliott as Granny; Henri Lubatti as Lumiere

Episode chronology
← Previous "The Tower"	Next → "It's Not Easy Being Green"
- Once Upon a Time (season 3)

"Quiet Minds" is the fifteenth episode of the third season of the American fantasy drama series Once Upon a Time, and the show's 59th episode overall, which aired on March 30, 2014.

In this episode, Neal finds himself back in Storybrooke and yearns for a way to reconnect with his son Henry, whose memories of his father are gone, while also trying to find his own father, Rumplestiltskin, whom he has just learned is alive but missing, and Regina discovers a possible connection with Robin Hood. Meanwhile, in the Fairy Tale Land of the past year, agonizing over the death of his father, Neal - with the help of Belle and enchanted candelabra Lumiere - attempts to find a magical solution to bring back Rumplestiltskin from the dead.

== Title card ==
The candelabra, Lumière, stands in the Enchanted Forest.

== Plot ==
=== In the Characters' Past ===
In the Enchanted Forest a year earlier, Belle and Neal talk about Rumplestilskin as they search for clues in his castle on how to find him. As they enter the library to check for any evidence, a voice starts calling for the two, and a face of flame in a candelabra is revealed to be Lumière, who tells them Rumplestiltskin had him entrapped in this form as punishment. He directs them to a key with a triangular sign on it, which opens the vault where the first Dark One was created. A curious Neal agrees to use it to try to bring back his father. Unbeknownst to Neal and Belle, Zelena enters the library, and is pleased that they just fell for her trap: she is using Lumière.

As Belle and Neal walk through the woods again, they find the location. Brushing away the snow, Neal finds a circular metal plate with symbols on it. When Lumiere, while ranting, claims he’s spent over 200 years in the library, Belle realizes that he is lying, for she knows how long the library has actually been there since Rumplestiltskin built the library specifically for her. Lumiere confesses that he works for Zelena, who cast the spell on him because she wants to find Rumplestlitskin's dagger, not knowing that if Neal does bring back his father, there will be a price to pay. Believing he can save both his father and his family, Neal opens the crypt, and he burns his hand, leaving the marked scar, and bubbling up slowly from the ground comes Rumplestiltskin. As he is finally reunited with Baelfire and Belle, they are interrupted by Zelena. Baelfire then falls to the ground, having learned that he has sealed his fate by saving Rumplestiltskin from Zelena: the process of bringing him back has a "life for a life" policy. Rumplestiltskin tries to save Baelfire by absorbing him into his own body, but cannot so long as he holds the dagger. Rumplestiltskin releases the dagger and absorbs Neal, but becomes insane as a result. Zelena snatches up the dagger and orders Rumplestiltskin to kill Belle, but Lumiere, deciding to do the right thing, uses his flames to hold Zelena back long enough for Belle to take him up and escape with him.

=== In Storybrooke ===
It's one year later in Storybrooke, and, at Granny's Diner, Emma Swan, David, Regina, Captain Hook and Mary Margaret have a meeting to discuss another search for Mr. Gold since they suspect that he might have escaped the cage. Meanwhile, out in the forest, Zelena starts searching for Gold, and she summons her flying monkey to find him after the dagger she now possesses fails to work. Later at the pawn shop, the group, minus Regina, meets up with Belle. Hook agrees to stay with Belle to protect her, even though she hasn't forgiven him for his actions during their prior encounters or accepted his sincere apology. David and Emma decide that because of her pregnancy, Mary Margaret has to stay home while Emma and David leave to handle the search. Belle and Hook are surprised by Neal, who stumbles into the shop and instantly collapses.

Over at the apartment, Zelena has shown up to play mid-wife to Mary Margaret by having her drink a glass of orange juice "in order to keep the baby healthy". However, the juice was spiked with a spell so Zelena can feel the baby growing inside Mary Margaret.

As Emma stops by the inn to check on Henry, he becomes suspicious that Emma isn't telling the truth, but Emma tells Henry that she will, but he must trust her until then. Emma then gets a phone call from Belle that Neal is alive and in the hospital, where they discover a branded scar on his right hand. Emma arrives to see Neal, who says that he was in Storybrooke and was looking his father but doesn't remember how it happened. Emma then takes a picture of his hand on her iPhone and sends it to Belle for research. Neal asks Emma about Henry, but Emma has made up her mind about not telling Henry or restoring his memories. After she leaves, Hook, who is on guard duty, brings Neal some Jello. They talk and bond over lost time, and resolve their differences. Neal tells Hook that he is leaving the hospital to find his father, and Hook decides to give Neal a head start before alerting the others about Neal’s escape.

Meanwhile, Regina decides to check out the farm house, when she hears something and catches an arrow launched by a startled Robin Hood. As they investigate the farm, Regina and Robin get better acquainted, sharing a drink when Robin comes across a bottle of whiskey. However, Regina recognizes something on his wrist: the lion tattoo. She realizes he was the soulmate Tinker Bell had taken her to meet back in the Enchanted Forest. Regina runs out of the house, leaving behind a confused Robin. Later on in the forest from a distance, she watches as Robin and his Merry Men play with Roland.

Around the same time, David and Emma search the forest for any signs of Gold, and they find him after they hear his voice. Emma tries to ask Gold about what happened but he keeps saying that the only thing he hears are voices in his head. The three are then greeted by the flying monkey, prompting them to split up. David injures the beast to slow him down while Emma runs after Gold, only to hear Neal's voice and she finds him instead. The pair resumes the search for Gold as Neal tells Emma that he has not given up on her and Henry. When Belle calls Emma to tell her that the scar on Neal’s hand resulted from attempting to bring Gold back from the dead, Emma drops her phone. As Emma watches Neal changing into Gold, he begs Emma to use her magic to separate them. Emma uses her magic to separate father and son, but Neal dies since he had sacrificed his life to bring his father back. Gold tells Emma that Zelena was the Wicked Witch of The West and that Emma, the savior, is the only one who can stop Zelena from carrying out her scheme. They mourn with Neal, who tells them that he loves them and Henry, before he dies.

Emma and David rush to the apartment to capture Zelena but find she has escaped through a window. They tell Mary Margaret about Zelena's true identity and that Neal is dead. Mary Margaret and Emma share a hug as Emma grieves her loss, and they go to Gold's shop, where Mary Margaret breaks the news, hugs, and comforts Belle.

Back in the forest, Gold sits next to Neal's body, and a gloating Zelena appears with his dagger, using it to control him. Gold tells Zelena (who reveals to him that she is after Mary Margaret's unborn child) that now everyone knows who she is, but since she has his dagger to control him, it doesn't matter anymore now that he has control of his brain. She tells him to go back to his cage, where he continues to mourn his late son. Moments later, Emma walks up to Henry at the park and they sit on a bench, where she admits to him that he was right about her not being honest with him about the case, saying that Neal was the client that hired her, but she was too late and he was gone. Emma tells Henry that Neal was a great man, a good father, and a hero. Henry, who says he wishes he could have known him, asks her what happened to the person who did it, and Emma says they got away, but she vows to Henry and to herself that she will find them.

== Reception ==
=== Ratings ===
The episode managed to maintain the same rating numbers from the previous outing, placing a 2.1/6 among 18-49s, but averaged only 6.46 million viewers, down slightly from the last episode.

=== Critical reception ===
The episode was met with mixed to positive reviews.

Hillary Busis of Entertainment Weekly gave it a good review but summed it up this way: "Considering Once's history, I'm still not totally convinced that this is the One True Death we were promised. For every really, most sincerely dead character on this show (Cora, Pan, Sheriff Skinnyjeans), there's one whose death stuck about as well as an old Post-It note (the Blue Fairy, Rumpel, Prince Phillip). Until we see Emma spreading Neal's ashes in a Tallahassee swamp, I will refuse to believe that there isn't the slightest possibility of him returning just in time to make the twisted Charming/White/'Stiltskin family tree whole again.

Christine Orlado of TV Fanatic gave the episode 4.4 out of 5 stars.

Gwen Ihnat of The A.V. Club gave the episode a C+, noting that "This pondering led me to wonder what I would do to fix the show right now, if I were able. OUAT’s still excels at reinterpreting of fables and legends, like the off-kilter look at Rapunzel in the previous episode. We’ve seen an Evil Queen progress from a villainous character to one whose flawed heart now is open to more possibilities. But numerous characters running around for an hour searching for the Wicked Witch is not compelling, and does nothing for the show overall. And inspiration from recent Disney interpretations would probably not be as effective as more elements from the classic Grimm tales." The review also took note of how the producers handled Neal/Baelfire's death scene: "Michael Raymond-James gamely played every troublesome hand he was dealt with this part, but there just wasn’t much good there. He played a tear-inducing death scene, though, and Jennifer Morrison brought it as well, but plotwise it’s almost an afterthought."
