= The Tower (Once Upon a Time) =

- Once Upon a Time episode
- Episode no.: Season 3 Episode 14
- Directed by: Ralph Hemecker
- Written by: Robert Hull
- Production code: 314
- Original air date: March 23, 2014

Guest appearances
- Rebecca Mader as Zelena/Wicked Witch; Sean Maguire as Robin Hood; Raphael Sbarge as Archie Hopper; Alexandra Metz as Rapunzel

Episode chronology
← Previous "Witch Hunt"	Next → "Quiet Minds"
- Once Upon a Time (season 3)

"The Tower" is the fourteenth episode of the third season of the American fantasy drama series Once Upon a Time, and the show's 58th episode overall, which aired on March 23, 2014.

In this episode, as Emma Swan, Captain Hook, Regina Mills, and David Nolan search for the Wicked Witch of the West in Storybrooke, Zelena puts her plan into motion by planning something dark for David, while back in the Fairy Tale world a year earlier, Charming comes to the aid of Rapunzel as he searches for a plant that could help him face his fears.

== Title card ==
Rapunzel's tower stands in the Enchanted Forest.

== Plot ==
=== In the Characters' Past ===
In the Enchanted Forest nine months prior to the new curse, Charming hears someone crying in the nursery, and sees Emma Swan wearing a gown that she plans to wear to her ball with her father. But as they start to dance the room starts to turn dark and the magical tree wardrobe starts to suck Emma into its portal, which wakes Charming up from his nightmare, but this time he and Snow White are back in the fortress, where Snow tells her husband that they are expecting another child.

The news of Snow's pregnancy leaves Charming with mixed feelings, prompting him to seek advice from Robin Hood, who suggests that he should look for a mystical herb called nightroot to help him calm down. Later on the next day as he starts chopping the root in the forest, Charming hears a woman screaming from a nearby tower, and notices a rope of long black hair which is revealed to belong to Rapunzel. She says she’s a king’s daughter who was also trying to seek out the nightroot in order to calm her nightmares after her brother died, but then tells him that the nightroot didn’t work.

Unbeknownst to the two individuals, a cloaked stranger arrives and climbs the tower. The mysterious person is revealed to be the exact double of Rapunzel, who is trying to steal her courage. As Rapunzel is lured into her fears, Charming tells her to fight back and face it, even as he almost loses his grip on her hair. He then insists that the only way to end the fears is by cutting them off and escaping the tower. The psychology works, and the hooded individual disappears after Rapunzel slices off her hair, allowing her to escape the tower. She then thanks Charming for helping her, saying that she was afraid to go home because of her brother's death, as he died trying to save her from drowning in a nearby creek. As Charming returns to the palace to reunite Rapunzel with her family, he confesses to Snow that he was afraid that he lost Emma twice.

=== In Storybrooke ===
Flash forward nine months later to present-day Storybrooke, where Emma, Regina, Mary Margaret, David, and Hook try to come up a plan to expose The Wicked Witch of The West. As they begin their search, Regina tells the others that she'll stay and keep Henry company. At the farm house cellar, Zelena takes care of her prisoner Rumplestiltskin, who has gone insane inside the cage. Zelena starts shaving Rumplestiltskin with his Dagger when she accidentally makes a cut, then apologizes sarcastically.

She later visits the pawn shop, where she tells Belle that she is looking for a gift to give to a baby, tricks Belle by freezing her with a green glow and immediately takes the nightroot that was kept in a jar inside the safe (using Rumplestiltskin's nicked blood).

At Regina's office, Emma, Hook, and David search for clues, when David recognizes a berry that he had seen once before in the forest. He then receives a text message from Mary Margaret that the new midwife has stopped by and wants to meet him.

As he arrives back to the apartment, Zelena is making tea for the Charmings, but David is very suspicious about Zelena, even after Mary Margaret tells him that Zelena was once friends with her late nanny Johanna. Unbeknownst to the two, Zelena is spiking one of the teas with the nightroot and after she returns to join in the conversation, Zelena asks David if he has any fears about Mary Margaret's pregnancy. David says no and takes a drink from the cup with the nightroot. As David later leaves the apartment and drives off, he begins to feel unnerved after he sees what appears to be a hooded individual in the road and texts Emma that he might have seen the Witch.

In between these events, Regina tries to bond with Henry at the park, where he tells Regina about Walsh, saying it was odd that his mother took him out of school to go to Maine two days after the proposal, noting that “We wouldn’t be here if she said yes.” Meanwhile in the forest, Hook discovers the berries that David recognized from Regina's office, but Emma suspects that Hook isn't telling her the truth about the past year. However, Hook says that he was glad that Walsh broke Emma's heart, saying that if her heart can be broken, it means it still works. As the two arrive at the farm house, they discover the cellar and investigate. Emma receives a message that David found the Witch in the forest, only for him to stab the individual, who turns out to be an exact double of David, who stares the real David down and drains him dry during their duel. The latter then sees Emma's car, prompting him to face his fears of being a father, vowing never to give in to fear. The double then disappears before Emma, Regina, and Hook arrive, where they find the cellar and the cage empty, the only clue left being a spinning wheel, indicating that she has Rumplestiltskin.

Regina tells David that the doppelgänger he was fighting with might be toying with them, but he doesn't remember anything about the previous encounter (when he saved Rapunzel from the individual). Regina believes that Zelena taking David's sword means that she's taken a part of his courage, or at least a symbol of it.

== Cultural references ==
- Regina makes a reference to Nancy Drew in response to Emma's detective work.
- More Wizard Of Oz references can be found in the kitchen stove and the bicycle that bear a resemblance to the items in the 1939 film.
- Goblins with a Shrek face are engraved in the decorations on the wall of Rapunzel's tower

== Reception ==
=== Ratings ===
Due to CBS' broadcast of the 2014 NCAA Men's Division I Basketball Tournament that ran overtime and altered that network's schedule, the outing saw a three percent drop from the previous episode, placing a 2.1/6 among 18-49s with only 6.91 million tuning in, but still won its time slot despite the setback.

=== Critical reception ===
The episode was met with mostly positive reviews, with many critics noticing the series taking a serious darker tone this time around, while a few thought the Rapunzel storyline was weak.

Hillary Busis of Entertainment Weekly gave it a good review: "Tonight's episode of Once was a lengthy meditation on fear that culminated in wicked Zelena getting her once-green mitts on a very special magical item: Prince Charming's courage, or at least "a symbol of it," according to Regina. So far, there don't seem to be any immediate consequences to what just happened; it's not as though David immediately turned into a sniveling coward once his courage was gone. We can, however, infer that the Witch is on some kind of Wizard of Oz-inspired collecting spree—one that, more likely than not, will find her looking to gather up a (symbolic) heart and brain to go with her newfound courage. Given her interest in Charming's wife, as well as the show's historical interest in what's beating within the princess's chest, it stands to reason that Snow's heart may be next on Zelena's list. (Think a cow as white as milk and a cape as red as blood also made it in?)

Amy Ratcliffe of IGN gave the episode a 6.7 out of 10, mostly due to the lack of character study in the Rapunzel storyline, calling it "Lame" and "Dull."

Christine Orlado of TV Fanatic gave the episode 4.3 out of 5 stars.

Gwen Ihnat of The A.V. Club gave the episode a B, noting that "'Once Upon A Time' goes the encapsulated episode route this week with “The Tower,” a look at defeating your fear, told from the perspective of Charming. Although he’s probably not the greatest character to devote an entire episode to, Charming’s internal journey here offers some nice opportunities for Josh Dallas, unshackled by Snow for once. And at least in “The Tower” our fairy-tale-of-the-week is introduced, has a nice twist, accomplishes some resolution, and now there’s no reason for us ever to see her again. Unlike characters who get their explanatory episodes and then are pretty much left hanging, like Ariel and Cinderella and the still-missing Tinkerbell."
