= New York City Serenade (Once Upon a Time) =

- Once Upon a Time episode
- Episode no.: Season 3 Episode 12
- Directed by: Billy Gierhart
- Written by: Edward Kitsis & Adam Horowitz
- Production code: 312
- Original air date: March 9, 2014

Guest appearances
- Rebecca Mader as Zelena/Wicked Witch of the West; Lee Arenberg as Leroy/Grumpy; Beverley Elliott as Widow Lucas/Granny; Sarah Bolger as Princess Aurora; David-Paul Grove as Doc; Gabe Khouth as Mr. Clark/Sneezy; Faustino Di Bauda as Sleepy; Jeffrey Kaiser as Dopey; Michael Coleman as Happy; Mig Macario as Bashful; Julian Morris as Prince Phillip; Christopher Gorham as Walsh; Sean Maguire as Robin Hood; Michael P. Northey as Friar Tuck; Jason Burkhart as Little John; Meghan Ory as Red Riding Hood; David Orth as NY Cop #1

Episode chronology
← Previous "Going Home"	Next → "Witch Hunt"
- Once Upon a Time (season 3)

"New York City Serenade" is the twelfth episode of the third season of the American fantasy drama series Once Upon a Time, and the show's 56th episode overall. The episode marks the mid-season premiere of the show, following the executive producers' decision to split the season into two volumes. It aired on March 9, 2014, with a special entitled "Wicked is Coming" preceding the premiere.

The episode also marks the first appearance of Rebecca Mader as Zelena, The Wicked Witch of the West, who is the primary antagonist for the second half of the season.

In this episode, after the fairy tale characters return to the Enchanted Forest, they discover something has changed that now places their lives in danger, resulting in Hook (Colin O'Donoghue)'s escaping to the real world in an effort to restore Emma Swan (Jennifer Morrison)'s memories so she can save them.

Most commentators commented positively on the episode, especially due to the unpredictable nature of the new storylines created by the writers and producers. Upon airing, the episode was watched by 7.66 million viewers, attaining an 18-49 rating of 2.4. This presents a significant rise from the previous episode. Furthermore, the episode achieved its highest weekly viewership rank for the series since the second episode of the second season in October 2012.

== Title card ==
New York City's skyline stands beyond the Enchanted Forest.

== Plot ==
=== In and Outside Storybrooke ===
Emma Swan, in her new life with Henry in New York City, goes on a date with her new boyfriend Walsh (Christopher Gorham) when she is interrupted by Hook who implores her to regain her memories and save her family. Emma angrily rebuffs him, despite using her superpower to prove he isn't lying. Hook passes her a note stating that it's an address where she will find her answers. After Hook leaves, Walsh proposes to Emma who is shocked and says she needs time to think.

The next morning, Emma hands Henry a permission slip for a field trip and finds Hook’s note which contains an address: Neal's former apartment. When she arrives, she finds a camera strap with Henry's name embroidered on it. Wanting answers, Emma meets with Hook in Central Park where he tries to convince her to drink a memory potion. Again Emma doesn't believe him and handcuffs Hook to a bike rack. She flags down NYPD officers and insists that Hook assaulted her. Despite his protests, the police take him away.

While Emma walks Henry home from school, she discusses adding Walsh to her and Henry's small family. Henry is in favor because he wants Emma to be happy. After dropping Henry off at home, Emma looks at the photos from Henry's camera which show them in Storybrooke. She is mystified and bails Hook out of jail. After complaining about the dreadful condition, Hook gives the memory potion which successfully restores all her memories.

Over a drink, Hook tells Emma about the events of the past year. Walsh arrives (as Henry set up a dinner between Emma and him) and Emma decides to tell him that she can't marry him for she has to go home to save her family. Walsh says that he wishes that she hadn't drunk the potion which perplexes Emma. Walsh reveals himself to be a flying monkey in disguise; he is from the Enchanted Forest and has been undercover, spying on her and keeping her happy in a fantasy life. He attacks Emma, and as Hook arrives, she knocks him off the roof with a nearby pipe. They watch as Walsh disintegrates upon contact with the ground.

The next morning Emma tells Henry that she "needs his help with a case.” Henry is overjoyed by the prospect of skipping school and helping his mother. Hook arrives and as he and Henry take their luggage to Emma's yellow bug, she dons her signature red leather jacket, and they leave for home.

That night the trio arrives in Storybrooke with Henry asleep in the car. Emma goes to Snow and Charming’s loft, and they share an emotional reunion. They revealed that Snow is pregnant. Even though they are cursed again, this time they know who they really are, but do not remember anything that happened in the past year.

=== In the Enchanted Forest ===
Storybrooke characters arrive back in the Enchanted Forest due to the curse and are met by Prince Phillip and a pregnant Princess Aurora. After catching up, Snow, Charming and Regina decide to make for Regina's castle since she protected it prior to the curse. Aurora and Phillip argue about telling "her" about the returned Storybrooke characters. Hook leaves the group since he believes there is nothing for him in the Enchanted Forest. He plans to find his ship, the Jolly Roger, and resume living a pirate’s life.

During the march to Regina's castle, Grumpy points out that the Queen is missing, and Snow finds her burying something in the forest. Regina is burying her heart due to the pain of never seeing Henry again, and the fact that he doesn't remember her. Snow convinces her that Regina can have happiness and that she deserves to find it for Henry, which leads to Regina putting the heart back in her chest. Snow and Regina are then accosted by a flying monkey, but they are saved by Robin Hood (Sean Maguire).

While walking to the castle, Belle and Baelfire talk about finding a way to resurrect Rumplestiltskin, and are reunited with Robin Hood. As the characters reach the castle, Regina realizes someone else has dispelled her protective barrier and put up their own. Robin Hood offers them shelter in Sherwood Forest until they can figure out their next move.

A flying monkey returns to the castle with the blood of Regina from his attack and gives it to a green skinned witch (Rebecca Mader), who adds it to a potion, gloating that she'll get her revenge and saying that while the Queen may be evil, she is wicked, and wicked always wins, revealing herself as the infamous Wicked Witch of the West.

== Production ==
Lost actress Rebecca Mader's casting as an upcoming villain for the series was announced in December 2013. It was later revealed that she will play The Wicked Witch of the West, despite rumors that she would be playing the One Hundred and One Dalmatians antagonist Cruella De Vil. Other casting confirmations for the second half of the season include Alexandra Metz as Rapunzel, Sunny Mabrey as Glinda the Good Witch, and Henri Lubatti as Lumiere.

In regard to the episode's setting, producer Adam Horowitz said to The Hollywood Reporter "The most fun is to deepen the characters and keep telling their story. So to see Emma and Henry in the real world is really interesting. The premiere is a lot about that." He then said regarding the tone for the rest of the season "I would say there is a sense of delicious fun that the Wicked Witch brings. It is a different tone than the fall. We felt Peter Pan was a very psychological villain and very Machiavellian. The Wicked Witch operates from a place of delicious wickedness."

Edward Kitsis and Horowitz also confirmed that they would incorporate Ginnifer Goodwin's pregnancy into the story, as she is currently expecting a child with co-star and fiancé Josh Dallas. Prior to this episode's airing, a special entitled "Wicked is Coming" is scheduled to air, which features interviews from the cast and the executive producers regarding the series's upcoming developments.

== Reception ==
=== Ratings ===
The episode proved to be a welcome relief after its hiatus and from its previous outing as it placed a 2.4/7 among 18-49s with 7.66 million American viewers tuning in, taking the top spot in the 8 to 9 p.m. hour in terms of ratings, even though The Amazing Race had more viewers during that hour. The outing also helped improved ABC's revamped Sunday night schedule that saw its viewership from this episode carried over to the debut of another fantasy series, Resurrection. The 18-49 share and viewing figures marked the highest ratings for the season since its second episode in October 2013.

=== Critical reception ===
The episode was met with mostly positive reviews, with many critics complimenting the unpredictable nature of the new storylines created by the writers and producers.

Amy Ratcliffe of IGN gave the episode a 9.1 out of 10, saying "The spring return of Once was creative and seemed to infuse the show with fresh energy. It even felt like the actors were more comfortable with each other. Hopefully the new curse and the introduction of the Wicked Witch keeps things lively." Though she did criticize the absurdity of Emma having been dating a flying monkey for eight months.

Lily Sparks of TV.com gave the episode a positive review, saying

Good things happened: I’m super glad everyone is back in Storybrooke. It’s fantastic that Emma’s memory has been restored so quickly. It’s an interesting shift in dynamic that she will now be trying to convince Henry that all this stuff is real. The crazy train is pulling out of the station, and I'm getting on board. We'll know in a few more stops whether it's headed in the complete wrong direction.

Courtney Vaudreuil of TV Equals also complimented the unpredictable setting that the writers have created stating "I don’t want to be prematurely optimistic, but I like the reboot in Once Upon a Time. I can’t tell what direction they’re going to go in next, which is nice. I am hopeful that all of Henry-centric stories are a thing of the past. Rebecca Mader looks fantastic as the Wicked Witch, so I’m excited to see what she does with the part." Christine Orlado of TV Fanatic gave the episode 4.6 out of 5 stars, praising the relationship between Snow White and Regina saying, "I loved the changes that have occurred between Snow and Regina. It's best for the kingdom if they band together, but there are doubts as to whether Regina is really on board, until Snow finds her burying her own heart." She continued, quoting Regina's line "I don't run from monsters. They run from me.", and naming it one of her favorite quotes from the show.

In a more critical review, Gwen Ihnat of The A.V. Club gave the episode a C−, noting that "A progressive restart can help rejuvenate a series (or a relationship), but not when nothing changes. Sure, the villain is now a Wicked Witch instead of an Evil Queen, but give or take a flying monkey, that doesn’t help much. You can repave it all you want with yellow bricks, but it’s still the same road."
