= New York City Serenade =

New York City Serenade may refer to:

- New York City Serenade (film), a 2007 comedy-drama film starring Freddie Prinze, Jr. and Chris Klein
- New York City Serenade (song), a song by Bruce Springsteen
- "New York City Serenade" (Once Upon a Time), a 2014 episode of the fantasy drama series Once Upon a Time.
