= Bleeding Through (Once Upon a Time) =

- Once Upon a Time episode
- Episode no.: Season 3 Episode 18
- Directed by: Romeo Tirone
- Written by: Jane Espenson & Daniel T. Thomsen
- Production code: 318
- Original air date: April 20, 2014

Guest appearances
- Rebecca Mader as Zelena/Wicked Witch; Rose McGowan as Cora; Sean Maguire as Robin Hood; David de Lautour as Jonathan; Eric Lange as Prince Leopold; Eva Bourne as Young Girl/Princess Eva; Steve Elliott as drunk Charlie; Yvette Dudley-Neuman as mid-wife; Brian Knox McGugan as drunk Charlie's friend; Raphael Alejandro as Roland; Michael P. Northey as Friar Tuck; Gabrielle Giraud as royal aide

Episode chronology
| ← Previous "The Jolly Roger" | Next → "A Curious Thing" |
- Once Upon a Time (season 3)

"Bleeding Through" is the eighteenth episode of the third season of the American fantasy drama series Once Upon a Time, and the show's 62nd episode overall, which aired on April 20, 2014.

In this episode, After Zelena steals Regina's heart, Regina casts a spell so that she can speak across the realms to her dead mother, Cora, to discover the truth about why she abandoned Zelena. However, when the spell is cast, not everything goes as planned. Additionally, Belle stumbles across what Zelena's ultimate end game is. Meanwhile, in the Fairy Tale Land that was, a young Cora is duped by a man claiming to be a prince, and she finds herself alone and pregnant. But a chance meeting with a real prince could lead Cora to the royal life she's always craved, but she must keep her pregnancy a secret or else risk losing everything.

== Title card ==
A tornado forms in the Enchanted Forest.

== Plot ==
=== In the Characters' Past ===
In the years before the first curse, a young bar girl named Cora is swept off her feet by a gentleman named Jonathan, who tells her that he is a prince. He makes an "I promise you the world"-type vow that he will come back in two weeks with a ring of gold, and proves it by giving Cora a ring he made out of straw. But when Jonathan tells Cora that he has to leave the next day, Cora decides that she is going to sleep with him that evening. Two months later, we find a now-pregnant Cora soaking wet in the rain and her straw ring coming apart, upset that Jonathan never returned. When she reaches the castle, Cora is shocked to learn Jonathan tricked her, and is actually a gardener; She screams in shock and as he takes off, a person comes to her aid, and it's revealed to be Prince Leopold, the future husband of Princess Eva (who he has yet to meet) and the future father of Snow White.

As Leopold and Cora start to bond together, this eventually leads the two to get engaged. However, this union would start to unravel when Jonathan visits Cora in the gazebo and threatens to blackmail her because she hid the truth about the unborn baby and he has become greedy by using her. Cora decides to buy his silence by giving him riches in return, not knowing that Eva, who just arrived to the palace, has been eavesdropping on their conversation. She uses that to her advantage later on at the banquet hall, where after Leopold, who has been hearing rumors of Cora's deception, learns from Eva about her after Cora lies to him about not being pregnant. Eva then tells Leopold to check Cora's pockets, which he discovers is laced with jewelry she had planned to deliver to Johnathan. Cora is then escorted out of the palace and Eva consoles Leopold, promising that she'll be able to give him an heir that is pure as snow after they are married.

Months later, Cora gives birth to Zelena and afterwards leaves her near a tree, telling her daughter that because she is a miller's daughter she can't give her the life she always wanted. After she leaves, a green tornado arrives and it carries the baby away to Oz.

=== In Storybrooke ===
In the present day at the Mayor's home, Zelena has come up with a way to distract Regina, first by offering her green apples, then initiating an argument between them. It appears that Zelena's plan has worked because Zelena has used the distraction to track down Regina's heart, and has Gold serve as her tracker, leading him to Robin Hood. When Robin tries to stop him, Gold uses his power to point Robin's arrow towards Roland. Robin is left with no choice but to hand over Regina's heart to Gold in order to spare his son's life. As Regina arrives to see Robin, she tells him she was not worried because “nothing’s worth the life of a child,” but now that her heart is with Zelena, Regina suspects that Zelena's real motive for taking her heart might be part of a bigger plot since Zelena has not killed her yet. So she pays a visit to Gold's Pawn Shop and starts searching for the answers, but not before getting an earful from Belle, who rattles off a laundry list of things that Regina did to her, prompting Regina to apologize to her. The two then discover that Regina's heart is related to her late mother's life when Regina finds the two-sided curse candle that was responsible for killing Cora over a year before.

As Zelena celebrates her latest conquests by storing the heart in a box with her winged monkey watching, she turns her attention to Gold by asking him to wear a suit to a dinner she has planned. She reveals to Gold that she is planning to go back in time, and she offers to bring Gold back with her so he can be reunited with Baelfire. Gold starts pretending to think that he wronged her, and he starts seducing her as a way of apologizing, knowing that she still has feelings for him. But when she discovers that Gold is after the dagger, she yanks it away from him and sends him back to his cage.

Hours later at the mayor's home, Emma Swan, Mary Margaret, David Nolan, and Captain Hook arrive to join Regina Mills in a seance to try to contact Cora from the dead, but after seeing a gust of wind blowing in, Regina comes to the conclusion that Cora is trying to keep the secrets buried with her. But just as Mary Margaret tries to finally cheer up Regina and finally bond, the two are unaware that the spirit of Cora is in the house. All of a sudden there's a knock from one of the rooms and when Regina opens it, the spirit of Cora pushes Regina aside as she goes after the person who killed her, Mary Margaret. Regina sends the two into another room, where she uses purple dust to hold Cora off, but Regina's power wears off, which allows Cora to easily knock Regina aside and possess Mary Margaret, who now sees what happened in Cora's past. However, Regina refuses to let Mary Margaret die, so she uses her magic to remove Cora from Mary's body and sends her back to the realm of the dead. Afterwards, Mary Margaret mumbles out the reasons behind Cora giving up Zelena. As she comes to, Belle, Emma, Hook, and David enter. Then, Belle reveals why Zelena needs Regina's Heart, David's Courage and Mr. Gold's Brain: Zelena is planning to create a time-travel spell, in which Zelena is planning to go back to the past to kill Eva and prevent Regina from being born. Thus, Cora would have never given her up, she would have been the one Rumplestiltskin tutors for magic, Snow White/Mary Margaret will never be born, and thus Emma and Henry would never exist. David then realizes that Zelena still needs a baby to enact the spell and that's why Zelena is trying to accelerate the pregnancy of Mary Margaret.

Regina and Mary Margaret, in a private meeting, finally make a start in putting aside any differences they had in the past, bonding over the fact that their mothers weren't as perfect as they thought. Mary Margaret tells a tearful Regina “I know you, and you feel things deeply, regardless of having a heart or not."

Moments later Regina goes to see Robin Hood. She finally kisses him.

== Reception ==
=== Ratings ===
The episode placed a 1.7/5 among 18-49s with only 5.65 million viewers tuning in, down three-tenths from the previous episode but enough to win the night, as a majority of the network shows across the board also posted losses for the second week in a row.

=== Critical reception ===
The episode was met with positive reviews.

Hillary Busis of Entertainment Weekly gave it a great review, especially involving the surprising plot line: "There are two main ways to enjoy a twisty, plot- and mythology-heavy series like Once Upon a Time. The first is to endlessly analyze it, carefully examining and picking apart the smallest details to see how well the show hangs together as a whole. The second is to ignore the minutia -- or try to, anyway -- and simply take the show at face value, accepting that everything in it is, to some extent, made up as its writers go along (and that this fact isn't necessarily a bad thing)." She also added "That said, they are frustrating if you demand a show with a narrative that hangs together like a beautifully made suit. (Remember, though: Once is a direct descendent of Lost. We shoulda known stuff like this was coming.)"

Christine Orlado of TV Fanatic gave the episode 4.6 out of 5 stars.

Gwen Ihnat of The A.V. Club gave the episode a B−, noting that "For all of Rebecca Mader’s scenery chewing as Zelena, the Wicked Witch, you’ve got to give her credit for imbuing her witch with not a little sympathy."
