= The Jolly Roger (Once Upon a Time) =

- Once Upon a Time episode
- Episode no.: Season 3 Episode 17
- Directed by: Ernest Dickerson
- Written by: David H. Goodman
- Production code: 317
- Original air date: April 13, 2014

Guest appearances
- Rebecca Mader as Zelena/Wicked Witch; Beverley Elliott as Granny; Christopher Gauthier as Mr. Smee; Joanna García Swisher as Ariel; Gil McKinney as Prince Eric; Charles Mesure as Blackbeard; J.C. Williams as Lead Guard; Jessa Danielson as Wench

Episode chronology
| ← Previous "It's Not Easy Being Green" | Next → "Bleeding Through" |
- Once Upon a Time (season 3)

"The Jolly Roger" is the seventeenth episode of the third season of the American fantasy drama series Once Upon a Time, and the show's 61st episode overall, which aired on April 13, 2014.

In this episode, Ariel pleads with Hook to search for Eric, whom she believes disappeared upon his return to Storybrooke, as Emma Swan receives a lesson on how to defeat Zelena from Regina, meanwhile, Mary Margaret and David try to convince Henry that they are not as boring as Henry thinks. Meanwhile, back in the Enchanted Forest, Ariel believes that Hook kidnapped Eric, but when Hook's ship disappears, the two start their search to find out what happened.

== Title card ==
A pick-up truck drives through the Enchanted Forest.

== Plot ==
=== In the Characters' Past ===
In the Enchanted Forest, a knight stands in the road blocking two other knights from passing and demands that they leave the treasure. The knights do not take him seriously but all of a sudden, flaming arrows light up all around the 2 knights and they retreat. It turns out that the knight who orchestrated this ambush is Hook, with help from Smee and two of his crew members, and all the flaming arrows were held by dummies. As they arrive to a tavern to celebrate their latest steal, Hook's men get him a bar girl, but outside he, not interested, gives her money and leaves. He gets knocked out by Ariel, who then orders Hook to his feet and he tells her she's got the wrong pirate. Ariel tells Hook that Eric was taken aboard the Jolly Roger, and when Hook asks her who's the captain of his ship now, Ariel shows Hook a knife with carved initials, which Hook recognizes as those belonging to a pirate named Blackbeard. Hook laments that he hasn't been the same since he got back to the Enchanted Forest because he hasn't used his ship. However, Hook is left with no choice but to have Ariel come along with him and Smee. As they trek across the forest, Hook tells Ariel that she may not find Eric, but she tells him she's heard stories of Hook helping Snow White reunite with her family in Neverland, and she says there's nothing wrong with being good, but Hook says (reluctantly) he's a pirate and that he always will be one.

As they reach the docks next to the Jolly Roger, Hook sees one of Blackbeard's men and knocks him out, when all of a sudden his adversary Blackbeard shows up to give him a message: if Hook wants his ship, he'll have to fight for it. Hook accepts and a sword fight battle commences, but just as Hook is about to kill Blackbeard, Ariel tells Hook they need to know where Eric is first, because he's not on board. It turns out that Blackbeard has left Eric stranded on a deserted island, and offers Hook a deal in which he'll tell him where Eric is if Hook gives up the Jolly Roger, or else Eric will die. Ariel tries to talk Hook into saving Eric and giving up the Jolly Roger, but he tells her love brings pain and that he's doing her a favour. As Hook cuts Blackbeard loose and tosses him overboard, Ariel slaps Hook and tells him he's selfish and heartless, and that's what will bring him endless torment. Then she jumps off the plank into the water to find Eric, changing back into a mermaid as she swims off.

=== In Storybrooke ===
In David and Mary Margaret's loft, Emma Swan helps David put a crib together, and Regina puts a protection spell over the loft to block out Zelena. Emma tells Regina she wants her to teach her magic so they can defeat Zelena. David then offers to watch Henry, but Emma says Henry doesn't think they're fun, as he thinks Hook is better to be around with. At the docks, a homesick Smee tells Hook he and the men miss him, but when he asks Hook what happened to the Jolly Roger, Hook tells him all he needs to know is the ship's not here and has no intention of leaving Storybrooke. As Emma walks up with Henry, Hook flirts with Emma and tells her he thinks it's good she's going to be learning about magic, which she says will be enough to defeat Zelena, then she's done, but Hook tells her she can't pretend this never happened since she can't go back to her old life, saying it didn't work for him.

At the same time, Mary Margaret and David walk on the beach and notice a group gathered around a woman who just washed up on shore, which they discover is Ariel. When Mary Margaret and David ask Ariel what happened to her, she tells them that Eric is missing and she's been looking for him, adding that she also has no memories of the missing year. David suggests that Hook might know what happened to Eric. Later on at Granny's diner, Hook teaches Henry how to roll dice, when David comes in and "introduces" Ariel to him, but when she asks Hook if he saw Eric during the missing year, he lies to her, saying that he never heard of him, and as the others (David, Mary Margaret and Ariel) talk about finding him in Storybrooke, Hook refuses to help (believing that Eric is dead), but David wants Hook to help Ariel anyway while he and Mary Margaret watch over Henry.

At Regina's vault, Regina warns Emma not to touch anything as they talk about Hook watching Henry and Hook flirting at Emma all the time. Regina then decides to teach her magic the tough way, using her magic to send Emma to a rope bridge across a deep chasm. Regina tells Emma that she's going to push her instincts, and as the boards start flying off the bridge, Regina says Emma has to reach into her gut; she can either stop it or die. Emma falls off the bridge, when she suddenly levitates herself back up to the top of the gorge.

Meanwhile, Mary Margaret and David talk about how to be more fun and cool around Henry than Hook, and David later proceeds to teach Henry how to drive in his truck, as Henry almost causes an accident as he almost hits a car and hits a mailbox.

Ariel and Hook pay a visit to Gold's shop and talk to Belle, where Hook finds his spyglass and notices an Ursula clasp that belonged to Eric. After a hopeful Ariel hugs Hook, Belle then pours a locator spell onto Eric's cloak, which will help bring them closer to Eric. At the docks, the two follow Eric's cloak as it floats through the air to the water, only to disappear under the surface, which disappoints Ariel, who starts to cry as she mourns her loss, and Hook tells her he's sorry. Ariel thanks Hook for helping find Eric's cloak, saying that she wishes she knew how it ended and that Hook has a true heart, adding that she will always be grateful to him. But as Hook runs up to Ariel he reveals to her they met in the missing year and explains what happened to Eric, saying that he was too ashamed to tell her before, he apologizes. Ariel calls Hook a coward and a monster because he traded a man's life for his ship. Then, when Hook begs for redemption, Ariel makes Hook swear that he still believes in love, and that he still loves the woman who broke his heart. Unfortunately, after admitting to his confession by swearing on Emma Swan's name, Ariel blows green powder onto Hook's lips and then transforms into Zelena, who had used her disguise as Ariel, because she knew that Hook's guilt from the day he chose the Jolly Roger over Eric would continue to haunt him. Zelena also cursed his kiss, meaning the next time he kisses Emma, her magic will disappear, leaving her powerless to stop Zelena. Since Hook realizes Zelena is unable to kill Emma, Zelena warns him that unless he kisses Emma to have her magic removed, she'll continue to threaten Emma's family and friends, by using Rumplestiltskin's dagger to kill them. Later that evening, Hook visits the loft to check on the Charmings and Henry, only to find just Emma and Regina. He then lies and tells Emma and Regina that Ariel had left to find Eric. Using a "magic mirror" spell, Emma watches the real Ariel and Eric embracing on a beach, happy and safe. As David, Mary Margaret and Henry return to the loft, Henry tells the others that he had a lot of fun with the couple. As Hook leaves, Emma tells him that even if he won't tell her what happened in the past year, she's tired of living in the past.

== Reception ==
=== Ratings ===
The episode posted a 2.0 among adults 18-49 with a total of 6.5 million viewers and won its timeslot. Overall, a majority of Sunday night programs were also down that evening besides this one.

=== Critical reception ===
The episode was met with positive reviews.

Hillary Busis of Entertainment Weekly gave it a great review: ""The Jolly Roger" was an appropriately exciting hour of television—complete with the sort of confounding, frustrating final twist that Once should consider having trademarked. All that, plus the return of JoAnna Garcia Swisher's delightfully daffy Ariel?

Christine Orlado of TV Fanatic gave the episode 4.4 out of 5 stars.

Amy Ratcliffe of IGN gave it an 8.5, saying that "This week's Once focused on Hook, and things got awfully exciting - in a good way."

Gwen Ihnat of The A.V. Club gave the episode a B, noting that "Hook has been one of the more delightful character reinventions on Once Upon A Time. Turning the classic permed villain into a swaggery anti-hero, now a tortured romantic, is one of the most successful character transformations this show has taken on. The episode title “The Jolly Roger” refers to Hook’s efforts to get his boat back, his true love, but really the vessel is just a stand-in for his actual true love, Emma, who—due to yet another unfortunate curse!—seems farther away from him than ever by the end of the episode."
