= Going Home (Once Upon a Time) =

- Once Upon a Time episode
- Episode no.: Season 3 Episode 11
- Directed by: Ralph Hemecker
- Written by: Edward Kitsis & Adam Horowitz
- Production code: 311
- Original air date: December 15, 2013

Guest appearances
- Robbie Kay as Peter Pan/Henry; Stephen Lord as Malcolm; Lee Arenberg as Leroy; Beverly Elliott as Granny; Keegan Connor Tracy as Blue Fairy/Mother Superior; Rose McIver as Tinker Bell

Episode chronology
← Previous "The New Neverland"	Next → "New York City Serenade"
- Once Upon a Time (season 3)

"Going Home" is the eleventh episode of the third season of the American fantasy drama series Once Upon a Time, and the 55th episode overall. It served as the mid-season finale, and marked the first time in the series that six different story lines were used: four involving the character's past, one in the present, and a combined alternate past/fast forward outcome, the latter setting up the second half of the season.

In this episode, Rumplestiltskin (Robert Carlyle) hatches a plan to stop Peter Pan (Robbie Kay) from destroying Storybrooke with Regina's (Lana Parrilla) curse; the end result has Regina making an action that will change Emma Swan (Jennifer Morrison) and Henry (Jared S. Gilmore).

The episode – written by Edward Kitsis and Adam Horowitz – received critical acclaim from critics, mainly due to the episode's ending and Rumplestiltskin's role; however, the episode saw a significant ratings drop, with 6.44 million viewers watching, and attaining an 18-49 rating of 1.9.

== Title card ==
Emma Swan's yellow Volkswagen Beetle drives through the Enchanted Forest.

== Plot ==
=== In the Characters' Past ===
==== Snow White and Prince Charming ====
As the Curse prepares to take place within hours, Snow White and Prince Charming tell the Blue Fairy that they are worried about the Curse. The Fairy tells them that there was nothing she can do except try to save the baby and that someday everything will be okay... someday. This was not the answer that Snow wanted, but Charming keeps on assuring her that everything will be okay. Snow looks at Emma's crib and believes the only thing her daughter will have is hope.

==== Hook and Tinker Bell ====
While he and Mr. Smee attempt to find a way off the island, Hook is unaware that someone has been following them, and uses a branch that takes Smee out. Hook looks at his unconscious mate and is surprised by Tinker Bell, who pulls out a knife in front of him. However, Hook, figuring out that Tinker Bell is a fairy, tells her that he has only one thing on his mind, which is to seek revenge on Rumplestilskin. He offers her a bottle of rum.

==== Rumplestiltskin and Belle ====
At Rumplestiltskin's castle, Rumple is marking Baelfire's birthday, and Belle approaches him. She says that maybe Rumple and his son can someday be together again, but Rumple, who did not want Belle to bother him, doubts that will ever happen.

==== Henry and Mary Margaret ====
In the days prior to Emma's arrival to break the Curse, Henry is talking to Mary Margaret, saying that he is frustrated that no one else in Storybrooke can see that their lives are just following a predictable pattern, referring to the entire town repeating everything since he arrived. As a way to get Henry to believe in himself, Mary Margaret gives him a large book called Once Upon a Time, which will set things up for Henry to bring his birth mother to Storybrooke, after Henry starts seeing Mary Margaret as Snow White.

==== Emma ====
Real – In the prison hospital, Emma gives birth to Henry, when she is asked by the doctor if she wants to see the baby, Emma declines. When the doctor tells her it isn't too late to change her mind, Emma says she can't be a mother.

New – In 2001, Emma finally gives birth to Henry at the prison hospital. However, the outcome takes a different twist: Instead of giving up Henry, she decides to keep him instead after she sees her son for the first time and she holds him, thus altering the outcome of her destiny thanks to Regina's spell.

=== In Storybrooke ===
At the well, Pan (who still occupies Henry's body) and Felix are talking about casting the Curse, as Pan drops the ingredients he took from Regina's vault in the well. He takes the final element needed to enact it, which was Felix's heart, because of his loyalty to Pan. Pan rips out Felix's heart, crushes it, and drops the ashes into the well. Back at the Vault, Gold explains that the only person who can stop it is Regina, but she will need the scroll to do it and since she was the one who enacted it in the first place, Regina is only one who can destroy the scroll. However, Gold warns Regina there will be a price. Gold also tells the others that he may be able to switch Henry and Pan's bodies back, but he needs the one thing that will reverse it, which is the wand of the Black Fairy. As everyone involved begins the search, Snow talks to Emma, lamenting that she never got to raise her daughter as Emma expresses empathy how she hasn't done the same for Henry, while at the church (where the other fairies/nuns are gathering for Mother Superior's wake), David, Tinker Bell, Hook, and Neal are looking for the wand, unaware that another individual is also looking for it as well: Pan's Shadow. Hook spots the Shadow but fails to stop it, prompting Tinker Bell to come to his aid by using some of her Pixie Dust to fly up to the Shadow, trapping and throwing it into a nearby fire, apparently killing it. Her actions also bring Mother Superior, whose shadow was taken by Pan's Shadow, back to life. She restores Tinker Bell as a real fairy and gives them the Black Fairy's wand.

Back at Gold's pawn shop, everyone gathers again to plan another course of action as Gold puts a special bracelet on Henry (who is occupying Peter Pan's body) so that when they swap bodies again, Pan will not have any magic. Gold then uses the wand and swaps Pan and Henry's bodies back. After they see Peter Pan back in his original body, Gold stands over his unconscious and powerless father, saying that he has some "unfinished family business" as everyone leaves to find Henry and the scroll. They find Henry (now in his original body) at the library, but as he hands the scroll over to Regina, a flash of light comes over her and she is knocked out. Around the same time at the shop, and as Pan wakes up, Gold taunts him because he wants Pan to see a bit of what life could have been like if they had just been father and son, but Pan wants none of it, telling Gold how horrible it was having a child that crushed his dreams. Gold picks up a sword and approaches Pan, who is aware that he is able to remove the bracelet (since Pan created the device) and places it on Gold, rendering him powerless, and then blasts Gold across the room, leaving his son cowering in the corner. Gold attempts to find a way to regain his powers, and the only way he can break free of the bracelet is by chopping off his hand.

Later at the street, Regina wakes up and says she knows what must be done to stop the Curse, however, Pan shows up to retrieve the scroll and freezes all of them. Pan decides to take out his grandson Neal, only to be thwarted by Gold, who shows up to stop him. After vowing to Neal and Belle that he is finally ready to pay the price to keep them safe knowing that means killing himself, Gold's shadow appears, carrying the Dark One's Dagger and hands it to Gold, who stabs both Pan in the back and himself in the chest at the same time. Pan transforms back into his true form and identity, Malcolm, who urges Gold to remove the dagger so they can start over and have a happy ending, but Gold tells his father "Ah, but, I am a villain, and villains don't get happy endings." He twists the knife and both men vanish in a burst of light. As Belle cries after they disappear, Neal asks a hesitant Regina if there is a way to stop the Curse, to which Regina replies that the only way to stop it is to give up the one thing she loved the most: Henry. As the Curse approaches, Regina tells Emma that she and Henry will have to leave Storybrooke forever because once the Curse takes place everyone will return to the Enchanted Forest and since Henry was born in the Land Without Magic, he won't be able to go back with them, but Emma will be able to stay with him because she's the savior and the only one who can escape it. Everyone gathers at the town line to say goodbye to Emma and Henry. Hook tells Emma that he will think of her every day; she smiles and says good. Regina casts a spell that will give Emma and Henry a lifetime of good memories, but they will forget everything that happened in Storybrooke. As Emma and Henry drive away, Regina destroys the scrolls, the Curse consumes everyone, and Storybrooke disappears.

=== Outside Storybrooke ===
One year later in New York City, Emma and Henry are in an apartment, and as she makes breakfast for Henry, she receives a knock on the door. When she opens it, she sees Hook standing outside, saying that he needs her help. This time around Hook warns Emma that her family is in trouble, but she has no idea who Hook is or what he is talking about. Hook, believing that "true love's kiss" will bring her memories back, attempts to kiss Emma, but the shock results in Emma kicking Hook, pushing him away, and violently slamming the door in his face. When Henry asks Emma who was at the door, she tells him that she doesn't know.

== Production ==
During an interview with the Los Angeles Times, Robbie Kay, who portrayed Peter Pan, talked about the body-switching plot and venturing to Storybrooke, saying "so there's an environmental shift so that character is not in his own court, if you will. So he's adapting to a new environment and obviously in the most recent episodes there was also a character shift. So I'm playing Henry and Jared [Gilmore] is playing Pan. That again was crazy, but a lot of fun."

== Reception ==
=== Ratings ===
The outing saw a slip in the ratings, as it places a 1.9/5 among 18-49s with only 6.44 million tuning in, a drop of two tenths from the previous outing and matching the same numbers it had for "Save Henry". The show placed fourth in its timeslot.

Including DVR playback, which added 2.50 million viewers, the episode was watched by a total of 8.94 million viewers with an 18-49 rating of 3.1 When rebroadcast on March 8, 2014, the episode received 1.37 million more viewers and a 0.3 rating, totaling 10.37 and 3.4.

=== Critical reception ===
The episode was met with universal acclaim, with many praising the episode's ending and Rumplestiltskin's fate.

Amy Ratcliffe of IGN gave the episode a 9.1 out of 10, saying "Once's winter finale was entertaining and enjoyable with just a few weak points. Losing Rumple hurt, and so did Storybrooke going away, but I don't think either will last for long. Regardless of what sticks, the events have led to a place that changes the landscape and is sure to set up an intriguing rest of the season." The ending of the episode was met positively by Ratcliffe, saying "As far as the jump forward in time, it was a smart decision. You know Emma and Henry have settled into their new life and become accustomed to a certain sense of normal (their breakfast scene had more than a hint of the routine when Desmond first appeared in Lost), but the leap is also necessary for at least one practical reason: Gilmore is growing up and now he has a reason to look older."

Jim Halterman of TV Fanatic gave the episode a 4.7 out of 5, saying "The one year time jump surprised me. I expected the show to end with that little yellow bug driving away from the Storybrooke that was. Instead we see Emma and Henry living a domestic and happy life together, until a strange knock at the door revealed a pirate with a hook. I loved that Hook kissed her. He was hoping that true love's kiss would unlock her memories. Unfortunately it doesn't work when it's a one way street.

Lily Sparks of TV.com gave the episode a highly positive review, saying:

The characters of OUAT have been feeling huge crazy things all season, but because this was the mid-season finale, the show actually tapped the brakes and gave the proceedings some gravity and the actors time to process it and to transfer the feeling to us. And we felt all of it! I get infuriated sometimes at how good this show can be, because it could be this good in every episode if it wanted to. It doesn't take flashy CGI to make this show intriguing, all it takes is slowing a scene down every once in a while and letting two people process in some real way the batshit hoop they're jumping through.

Gwen Ihnat of The A.V. Club gave the episode a B−, noting that "Wow, a lot to process this hour: When Once Upon a Time gives you a midseason finale, they frickin' mean it. With the Pan plot coming to a close, a new storyline needed to open up. And in Storybrooke's case, that's wide open."

Hilary Busis of Entertainment Weekly summed it up with these comments:

Remember how season 2's winter finale brought an entire half-season's storyline to a satisfying end by conclusively returning Snow and Emma to Storybrooke? Well, Sunday's episode went about a hundred times farther, effectively tying a pretty white bow on the entire show's storyline – at least, until that handy "One Year Later" tag (Captain Swan lives!) and a preview promising the imminent introduction of the Wicked Witch of the West. (Just what Once needed: Another villain who's more compelling than any of the show's heroes.) Of course, that line of thinking is totally moot because "Going Home" wasn't the end of Once Upon a Time – it was merely the end of the show's latest chapter, an oft-frustrating string of episodes that wasted too much time running in place and then decided to launch an all-out sprint to the finish. Luckily, that sprint largely worked – shoehorned-in Tinker Bell redemption plot and all.

Kylie Peters of Den of Geek looked to the season's future, saying "Things are going to change a lot in the second half of the season. Storybrooke is gone, so it looks like most of the action will take place in the Enchanted Forest. Hopefully Emma's denial phase doesn't last long; we already saw that all through season 1."

Many other critics commented positively on the episode's flashforward. Andy Swift of Hollywood Life said "We're used to being bombarded by flashbacks on Once Upon A Time, but the midseason finale decided to throw us for a loop by jumping forward in time at the end of the hour." Andrea Reiher of Zap2it commented positively on this, saying "The time jump is nice, since Jared Gilmore is starting to age out of his character. That will help considerably."

Rumplestiltskin's death received much reaction from critics. Jason Evans from the Wall Street Journal said "I hope they figure out a way to bring him back as he's been my favorite character on the show since the very beginning. But, whether Gold comes back or not, it is clear that when Once Upon a Time comes back in three months, the focus will be on getting Emma and Henry's memory back." Rebecca Martin from Wetpaint also commented on it, saying "Things we expected to happen in the Once Upon a Time Season 3 midseason finale: Peter Pan dying. Things we did not expect to happen in the Once Upon a Time Season 3 winter finale: Rumplestiltskin dying. Things that actually did happen in the Once Upon a Time Season 3 winter finale: both. Or so it would appear."

Tierney Bricker of E! Online called Rumplestiltskin's death and the flashforward ending among the "OMG TV Moments of the Night".

Liane Bonin Starr of HitFix gave a worrying reaction to the episode, saying:

Because this is Once Upon a Time, [sic] I don't know if I accept any character as really and truly dead, um, ever. I don't accept any plot twist as irreversible, either. But dammit, OUAT has me worried with this midseason finale. Logically, I understand there was a need for the show to make some big moves. I suspect, given the ending, those big moves won't be as permanent or lasting as earlier scenes led us to believe. But still, I think Kitsis and Horowitz have decided to shake the toy box to mix things up, and I can only hope (Hope! Hey, the theme of the episode!) it portends a fresh storyline – one we richly deserve after the claustrophobic Neverland.

Natalie Abrams of the Seattle Post-Intelligencer also acknowledged the episode, saying, "Once Upon a Time will never be the same after Sunday's midseason finale."
