= The New Neverland =

- Once Upon a Time episode
- Episode no.: Season 3 Episode 10
- Directed by: Ron Underwood
- Written by: Andrew Chambliss
- Production code: 310
- Original air date: December 8, 2013

Guest appearances
- Lee Arenberg as Grumpy; Beverly Elliott as Granny; Robbie Kay as Peter Pan/Henry; Joanna García Swisher as Ariel; Keegan Connor Tracy as Blue Fairy/Mother Superior; Rose McIver as Tinkerbell; Freya Tingley as Wendy Darling; Matt Kane as John Darling; James Immekus as Michael Darling; Gil McKinney as Prince Eric

Episode chronology
| ← Previous "Save Henry" | Next → "Going Home" |
- Once Upon a Time (season 3)

"The New Neverland" is the tenth episode of the third season of the American fantasy drama series Once Upon a Time, and the show's 54th episode overall. The episode, which aired December 8, 2013, was written by Andrew Chambliss and directed by Ron Underwood.

In this episode, The residents of Storybrooke are overjoyed upon the return of Henry (Jared S. Gilmore) and the rest of the crew from Neverland. But unbeknownst to them, a plan is secretly being put into place by a well-hidden Peter Pan (Robbie Kay) that will shake up the very lives of the townspeople. Meanwhile, in the Fairytale Land that was, Snow White (Ginnifer Goodwin) and Prince Charming’s (Josh Dallas) honeymoon turns out to be anything but romantic when they go in search of a mythical being that could stop Regina (Lana Parrilla) cold in her tracks.

Commentators on the episode gave mixed to positive reviews, with some commenting positively on Gilmore and Kay's roles, but others commenting negatively on the show's dependency on flashbacks. Upon airing, the episode also saw a slight increase in ratings, with 6.94 million viewers and an 18-49 rating of 2.1.

== Title card ==
The gorgon Medusa moves through the Enchanted Forest.

== Plot ==
=== In the Characters' Past ===
At the Kingdom castle, Snow White and Prince Charming prepare for their wedding day. But just moments after they are married, Regina's threatening the whole kingdom, which will lead up to events of the curse. This threat causes Snow White to postpone her honeymoon, but relents to Charming and says they'll go to the Summer Palace instead. After Charming carries Snow over the threshold, and after he leaves the room, Snow, who actually had other plans to defeat her stepmother, puts on her archer's outfit and jumps out the window, unaware that Charming was waiting for her, as he predicted that she was planning something behind his back. Snow tells her husband that her plan was to travel to the Gorgon Cave, where she hopes to find the Greek mythical individual known as Medusa by cutting off her head and sending it to Regina so she will turn to stone. Believing this is too risky for Snow, Charming insists on coming along anyway.

As the couple arrive inside the Gorgon Cave, Snow and Charming seek out Medusa by playing cat and mouse. Unfortunately, Snow's sword disintegrates upon making contact with Medusa's neck and worse yet, Charming looks up at the wrong moment after he sees Medusa, and he turns to stone. Regina then contacts Snow through her rippled shield and taunts her stepdaughter for destroying her own happiness – she never lifted a finger to get Snow in mortal danger, she did it all by herself. This leads Snow to realize she can get Medusa to destroy herself by looking at Medusa's face in the shield, which is as shiny as a mirror. The ploy works and Medusa turns herself into stone, resulting in Charming returning to human form. The two decide to give up their plans to destroy Regina and they return to the Summer Palace, where Snow later admits to Charming that she was obsessed with defeating Regina because she wants to have a baby. But now that she realizes whether or not the Evil Queen's threat will happen, they have to move forward.

=== In Storybrooke ===
As the individuals return from Neverland in their triumphant rescue of Henry (Jared S. Gilmore), we also discover that Ariel has reunited with Prince Eric, working as a fisherman, and hugs and kisses her. The Jolly Roger flies in for a landing and Wendy reunites with her brothers, and the entire town breaks out a joyous reunion of hugs and congratulations. Amidst the celebration, Henry (whose body is occupied by Peter Pan) wants to "punish" Felix, who is in on the secret, as Pan is ready to set his plan in motion. All parties tell "Henry" that as long as "Peter Pan" (whose body is occupied by Henry) is inside Pandora's Box, he will never escape and only Gold can release it. Meanwhile, over at Granny's, Hook tells Neal he is planning to back off of going after Emma Swan (Jennifer Morrison), thinking that Emma is going to reject Neal, who then talks to Emma about a lunch date to break the ice after 11 years. Around the same time, and despite support from Regina, Mother Superior won't give Tinker Bell back her wings because Tinker Bell doesn't believe in herself enough to keep the pixie dust alive. After Henry (Pan) tells Emma that he wants to stay with Regina, she begins to suspect that Henry is exhibiting strange behavior. As Regina returns to her home, Pan then stalks around Henry's "old room," then as Regina comes in he asks her about Regina's magic vault, pretending he wants it to protect himself from Pan. Regina tells him the vault is sealed because it's dangerous, and after she puts the book down, which Pan has been studying, she tucks him in. As soon as she leaves the room, Pan opens the window, and summons the Shadow, who breaks free from the Jolly Roger sails and starts flying.

At Granny's the next day, Gold gives David the antidote to the dreamshade poison. Gold however asked David that there will be no price for this cure but will ask for a future favor. After David drinks the potion, he kisses Mary Margaret and tells her he's ready to restart a family, at Mary Margaret's shocked look, he tells her "Well, not right now!" but Mary Margaret explains to David that she's sad because she sees Neal eating alone, so Emma didn't take her advice. Emma is outside and is concerned about what has happened to Henry, but David gives his daughter a pep talk that good things are happening too. As he leads her back to the café, Emma wonders if he isn't really just trying to keep her away from Hook. While Emma and David share their father/daughter moment, Hook is flirting with Tinker Bell in the hallway of the rooms in Granny's Inn when they hear a scream and go running out. The two, along with Emma and David discover that the Shadow is chasing down the Mother Superior, and kills her. Hook knows the Shadow only takes orders from one person, and that person is now in Storybrooke: Peter Pan.

It turns out that Pan (as Henry) needs Regina to protect him due to the protection spell. When Emma tells Regina something's off with Henry, Regina replies that Emma forgets that Regina had 10 years of soothing him. Regina then takes "Henry" to the Vault, where he sees a sleeping potion and uses it on her. Emma suspects Pan is using the Shadow from inside the box, so she convinces Gold to release the box by taking it outside the line of Storybrooke, in a world with no magic. As Emma crosses the line, as she is the only one not affected by the curse, Gold opens the box and Peter Pan (who is actually Henry) suddenly appears and looks confused, calling Emma "mom". As Mary Margaret, David and Belle witness this, Emma holds him off with a gun but Gold insists she shoot him, until Emma asks "Pan" to tell her something only Henry would know, then convinces everyone when he tells her that they first connected in "his castle," and that she gave him up because it was “his best chance”. Emma believes him. As everyone hugs the "Real Henry," Gold apologizes for doubting him. The individuals then join Hook, Neal and Tinker Bell at the Vault, where after Gold pries open the door, they find Regina on the floor and Gold revives her. As Regina embraces the "Real Henry" after they hugged, Gold discovers that Pan has stolen the scroll that contained the Curse that brought everyone to Storybrooke, except this time there's nothing that even Regina and Emma can do. And as "Henry" and Felix look over the entire town, Pan reveals that once they enact the Curse, the residents will once again lose their memories and that Pan will turn Storybrooke into "the new Neverland."

== Reception ==
=== Ratings ===
After two weeks of declining numbers from the previous outings, this installment posted an increase in viewership, scoring a 2.1/5 among 18-49s with 6.94 million viewers tuning in. The show placed third in its timeslot and seventh for the night. This episode is the most-watched episode since the episode "Ariel," which delivered 7.55 million viewers.

=== Reviews ===
The episode garnered mixed to positive reviews from most critics.

Liane Bonin Starr of HitFix gave the episode a mixed to positive review, focusing on the episode's pace and simplicity, saying

This week's episode of "Once Upon A Time" isn't exactly twisty-turvy. We know Henry (well, Pan in Henry's body) is going to put some nefarious plan into action, and everyone will fall for it because their defenses are down, and the pieces will be put in place for a bang-up midseason finale next week. Still, there are a few surprises, like the appearance of a really cheesy-looking Medusa. The scope of the show is getting a little broad, in that Greek mythology (Pandora's box and Medusa), Arthurian legend and Mary Shelley's favorite monster all fall under the fairytale banner. But I guess as long as we don't see ewoks, hobbits or the cast of "Glee" in any future episodes, I guess it's all fine.

Hillary Busis of Entertainment Weekly criticized the episode's (and show's) excessive use of the flashback, saying "Perhaps instead, the show could simply try cutting way back on glimpses into the pasts of Snow White, Prince Charming, Regina, and Rumpelstiltskin -- unless those glimpses convey crucial new information that's actually relevant to the show's main narrative arc. (Lil' Rumpel's trip to Never Land with his dad would count; Regina's brief encounter with Tinker Bell wouldn't.)"

Kylie Peters of Den of Geek gave Jared Gilmore's portrayal of the body-switched Henry a positive review, saying "Most of the episode revolves around Pan’s machinations for Storybrooke domination in Henry’s body. Jared Gilmore does a good job as body-switched-Pan, which I take as proof of my theory that Gilmore is not a bad actor, Henry is just a poorly-written character. Robbie Kay, playing body-switched-Henry, is significantly less convincing this week. I rest my case;" she was, however, more critical of the episode's cliffhanger, saying "Apparently, amnesiacs accept teenage dictators as entirely legitimate. I thought we were done with the curse plotline? Does that really need to be resurrected?"

Lily Sparks of TV.com gave the episode a negative review, noting the show's returning to old themes, saying "there was definitely a sense of "This again?" in "The New Neverland." Maybe it was just Ginnifer Goodwin's wig that was giving me deja vu."
