= Save Henry =

- Once Upon a Time episode
- Episode no.: Season 3 Episode 9
- Directed by: Andy Goddard
- Written by: Christine Boylan & Daniel T. Thomsen
- Production code: 309
- Original air date: December 1, 2013

Guest appearances
- Robbie Kay as Peter Pan; Raphael Sbarge as Dr. Archie Hopper; David Anders as Dr. Whale; Beverley Elliott as Granny; Rose McIver as Tinker Bell; Parker Croft as Felix; Darien Provost as Lost Boy #1; Jack Di Blasio as Lost Boy #2; Freya Tingley as Wendy; Matt Kane as John Darling; James Immekus as Michael Darling; Julian D. Christopher as adoption agent; Giancarlo Esposito as Sidney Glass (Voice)

Episode chronology
← Previous "Think Lovely Thoughts"	Next → "The New Neverland"
- Once Upon a Time (season 3)

"Save Henry" is the ninth episode of the third season of the American fantasy drama series Once Upon a Time, and the show's 53rd episode overall.

In this episode Emma Swan, her mother, and Regina Mills come face to face with Pan, while flashbacks show Regina adopting Henry.

== Title card ==
Pan's shadow hovers and then swoops through the Enchanted Forest.

== Plot ==
=== The Enchanted Forest ===
In the final hours before the curse is enacted, the jailed Rumplestiltskin (Robert Carlyle) reminds Regina (Lana Parrilla) that in 28 years, the Savior, who will be Emma Swan, still holds the power to overthrow her and break the curse. While Regina boasts that she has it all now, Rumplestiltskin warns her that she will return to him one day, seeking a remedy to fill the hole of emptiness in her heart.

=== In Storybrooke ===
Mayor Regina Mills begins to feel the emptiness in her position of power of controlling the town, and the only way to fill that void is to adopt a child, but she realizes that she'll have to wait a long time due to the possibility of being placed on a waiting list, so she (as predicted in the pre-curse) turns to Mr. Gold for help, but he then cautions her that when she becomes a parent, she should consider that she will be putting a child first. Days later, Regina learns that a baby has become available for adoption, so she travels to Boston to take custody of the child. The only warning the agency offers Regina is that the family has opted for a complete blackout concerning their lives (the sealed documents that Emma signed). Regina, convinced that she only needs the future, takes the newborn infant in her arms and names him after her father, Henry. Regina is starting to discover how difficult it is raising Henry, as the baby proves to be fussy and she's not able to soothe him. Unable to get any information from his past that she can give Dr. Whale after she takes Henry in for checkup, Regina calls in a few favors to get the identity of the birth mother accomplished through Sidney. The baby is uncooperative only for Regina, but when he is around Mary Margaret he calms down.

Finally, Regina gets Henry to settle down at her home, only to learn from Sidney that Henry is the son of the Savior who will arrive in Storybrooke, prompting Regina to confront Gold at his pawn shop over this claim. However, Gold does not recall anything he told Regina due to the curse, or as he supposedly claims. So Regina decides to return to Boston with Henry and is ready to give him up to new parents. However, when she is left alone with him in the office, Regina decides that she needs him in her life and ends up taking him back home. Regina is unaware the other parents who were trying to adopt Henry had she went through with giving him up, were none other than John and Michael Darling, who were following Peter Pan's orders to take Henry back to Neverland. Having given careful thought, she now starts to worry about the future when Henry's natural birth mother will come to take him away from her because of a certain fate, Regina takes Henry and tells him a fairytale about a Queen who drinks a potion to remove the worries of her past, while Regina does just that.

=== In Neverland ===
As Emma, Neal, and Regina try to keep Henry (Jared S. Gilmore) alive after a brutal attack by Peter Pan (Robbie Kay) via a scar that was cut from Emma's sword, Regina tries to get Emma to understand that Henry may call them both ‘Mom,’ but Emma has more in her life to lean on, while Regina has only Henry. They realize that Pan will only be defeated if they all work together to hunt him down and kill him, a move that gives Emma an idea. As they return to Pan's camp, Emma tries to talk to the Lost Boys, convincing them that she will bring them all home to families if they cooperate. The Boys, convinced that Pan has betrayed them despite Felix's protest, give in and tell Emma that Pan is in his Thinking Tree. As Neal takes charge of Henry, Hook takes the boys and prepares the Jolly Roger while Emma, Regina, and Mary Margaret, who wishes to spend her moments with her daughter, go after Pan and retrieve Henry's heart.

At Pan's Thinking Tree, Emma, Mary Margaret, and Regina see Pandora's box, and Regina suspects it's a trap as they find out that Gold is trapped inside. The ladies are then berated by Pan, who tells them that Gold is his son and afterwards are captured by a tree that feeds off of regrets (Emma for giving up Henry, Mary Margaret for giving up Emma), but Regina, whose love for her son outweighs any regret for the things she'd done that led to her getting him, manages to break free of the tree and grab Henry's heart from Pan's chest and the box holding Rumpelstiltskin. Regina then restores Henry's heart just in the nick of time. As everyone makes it on board the Jolly Roger, Regina goes below deck and tucks Henry in, then casts a spell on his heart to protect it. Meanwhile, up on deck, Gold is released from the box and reunites with Neal, who takes to calling him Papa and they embrace, as does Emma and her parents. However, after Regina left Henry in the room, Pan appears once more, this time with a knife, and apologizes for what is about to happen. He attempts to seize Henry's heart but Regina had enacted a spell to protect it. He is then caught by Gold after he went downstairs suspecting something wrong and discovers Pan trying to rip Henry's shadow from him, prompting Gold to use payback at his father by capturing Pan in Pandora's box. As Pan is sucked into the box, his eyes begin to glow, and Henry's eyes glow at the same time. Neal unleashes the shadow and Regina captures him into the sail. The crew heads home to Storybrooke, with Wendy, The Lost Boys and Tinker Bell joining them. Henry approaches Felix and tells him, “Pan never fails,” revealing that Pan in fact possessed Henry's body when Gold opened Pandora's box.

== Reception ==
=== Ratings ===
The episode's ratings matched the previous outing, scoring a 1.9/5 among 18-49s with 6.60 million viewers tuning in, tying it as the lowest rated episode in the series so far.

=== Critical reception ===
The episode was given highly positive reviews from critics, noting Regina's role and the episode's cliffhanger.

Christine Orlando of TV Fanatic a 4.7 out of 5, acclaiming the episode, saying "I really felt for Regina those first few days with baby Henry. As a parent, it's the worst feeling in the world when you feel as though you can't take care of your child." She also called the cliffhanger in the episode "a complete shock." Andrea Reiher of Zap2it also commented positively on Regina's role, saying "Nothing could have made me more sympathetic for Regina than watching her struggle as a single mom, worried that something's wrong with her baby (or herself) and wondering if she's a bad mother or that her baby hates her because he won't stop crying." She also commented positively on the cliffhanger, saying "Loved the brief turn at the end of the episode of Jared Gilmore doing Henry-as-Pan. He's not a bad little actor and it should be fun to watch this play out."

Hillary Busis of Entertainment Weekly also gave the episode positive feedback, saying "On this post-Turkey Day weekend, let's all give thanks to "Save Henry" for finally getting us off the dark, dreary island of Never Land, tying up the first half of season 3 with a magical little bow... and then, in true Once fashion, reminding us once more that happy endings are never as uncomplicated as they seem." In regard to the episode's cliffhanger, she said "I'm so glad that thanks to this last-minute switcheroo, the awesome Robbie Kay's Once arc hasn't yet drawn to a close."

Lily Sparks of TV.com gave the episode a positive review, saying "What an amazing episode. Seriously, after having the title grilled into our brains via hashtag, "Save Henry" was intended to be a season highlight, and by golly it sure as sh** was."
