= Mig Macario =

American Canadian Filipino actor

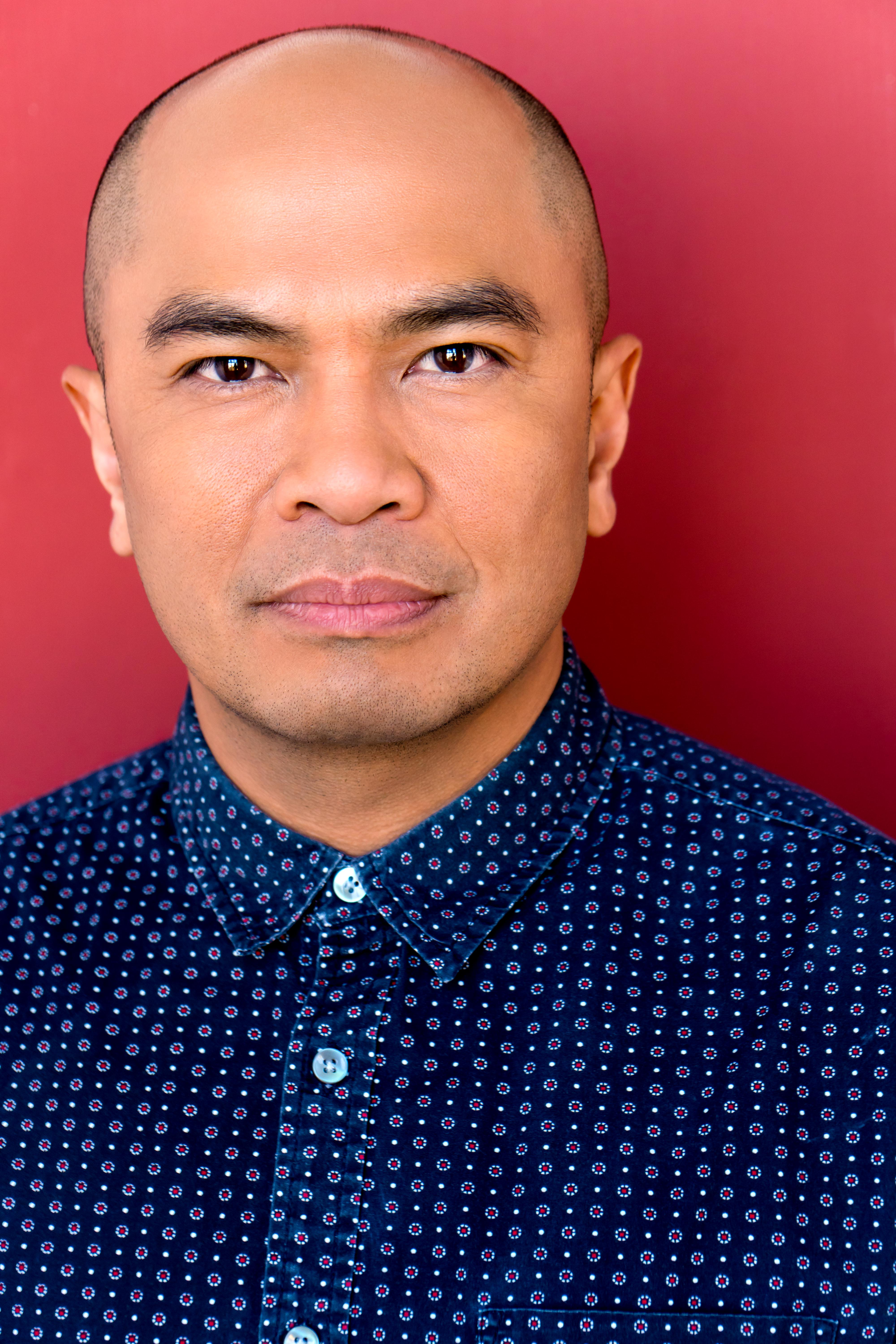
- Born: March 16, 1970 (age 55); Atimonan, Quezon, Philippines
- Occupation: Actor
- Years active: 1986-present
- Website: migmacario.workbooklive.com

Mig Macario (born March 16, 1970) is a Filipino American Canadian actor. He is best known for playing Bashful of the Seven Dwarfs on the ABC series Once Upon a Time. He has also starred in the Dan Gilroy film Velvet Buzzsaw with Jake Gyllenhaal, and has recurring roles on Ruby Herring Mysteries, Sanctuary and The Troop. Mig has also been featured in many national commercial campaigns for clients such as Lexus, Doritos, DirectTV, Bubly and UberEats.

== Biography ==
Mig was named after the Filipino revolutionary general, and actor Macario Sakay. He was born in the Philippines, grew up in Vancouver, Canada, and is now based in Los Angeles, California. Macario is a practicing Nichiren Buddhist with the Soka Gakkai.

Early in his career, Macario played petty criminal characters in shows like 21 Jump Street, Wiseguy, and The Commish. Macario broke out from these roles when he played the lead role of Song Liling, in the Tony Award-winning play M. Butterfly at the Arts Club Theatre. Macario's performance earned him a Jessie Richardson Theatre Award nomination for best newcomer. His producing, writing and directing debut was on the highly rated Summer Love - The Documentary, which explored rave culture and aired on Much Music.

Macario has appeared in over 50 film and television projects; working with artists such as Jake Gyllenhaal, Toni Collette, John Malkovich, Rene Russo, Daveed Diggs, Ginnifer Goodwin, Taylor Cole, Jennifer Morrison, Johnny Depp, Maury Chaykin, Paul Sorvino, Dean McDermott and Jenny McCarthy. He plays the iconic Disney character Bashful of the 7 dwarfs on the hit ABC series Once Upon a Time. Macario has had roles on the Gemini Award-winning, dark comedy Less Than Kind, Level Up, Sanctuary, FRINGE for Fox and Nickelodeon's The Troop.

== Selected filmography ==
Year	Show	Title	Role
1986	Fifteen	Various	Miguel
1987	21 Jump Street	"Gotta Finish the Riff"	Dale
1987	21 Jump Street	"After School Special"	Tito
1988	21 Jump Street	Slippin' into Darkness	Ranger No. 4
1989	21 Jump Street	God is a Bullet	Student No. 2
1990	Neon Rider	Father and Son	Vincent
1991–1992	Northwood	Various	Bill
1992	The Commish	Charlie Don't Surf	Tuan
1993	Madison		Christopher
1996	The Sentinel	Killers (1996)	Danny Choi
1997	Dad's Week Off		Lew
1997	The Adventures of Shirley Holmes	The Case of the Singer's Secret	Ray Wong
1997	Medusa's Child		Ian
1998	The Sentinel	Prisoner X	Ray Liotta
1999	Summer Love the Documentary (Co-Director/Producer)		The Raver
1999	Nightman	Ring of Fire	Eddie Chin
1999	Hope Island	Each Tub Must Stand on Its Own	Henry Dobyns
2000	Cold Squad	Slave to the Job	
2002	Hikaru No Go		Yan Hai/Pi Ling's friend
2003	Master Keaton		Shou
2004	The Dead Zone	Deja Voo Doo	Foley
2004	The Collector	Another Collector	Escobar
2004	The Final Cut		Rom
2005	Cold Squad	C'mon I Tip Waitresses	Rosario Dix
2007	Everest Mini Series		Sungdare
2007	Less Than Kind	Various	George Amahit
2009 - 2010	The Troop	Various	Mr. Spezza
2009	Santa Baby 2: Christmas Maybe		Sandy
2010	Killer Mountain		Yeshe
2010-11	Fringe	Various	Tech (Tucker)
2011 -	Once Upon a Time	Various	Bashful
2011	Sanctuary	Untouchable, Acolyte	Wahid/Crixorum
2012	Fairly Legal		Warne
2013	Level Up		Titocona
2013	Arctic Air		Hui
2014	Warriors	Pilot	Mig/Anesthesiologist
2014	Run for Your Life		Foreman
2014	Intruders		Bellman Thomas
2014	Rush	Where is my mind	Kenny
2014	The Whispers	What Lies Beneath	Scientist 1
2015	Second Chance		Charlie Laskey
2016	All Things Valentine		Roland
2016	Garage Sale Mystery		
2016	Shut Eye		Kurt
2017	S.W.A.T.		Father Guzman
2017	Criminal Minds		Dr. Michael Bateman
2019	Ruby Herring Mysteries	Silent Witness	Derek
2019	Velvet Buzzsaw		Cloudio
2020	Ruby Herring Mysteries	Her Last Breath	Derek
2020	Helstrom	Mother's Little Helpers	Liddle
2020	Ruby Herring Mysteries	Prediction Murder	Derek
2020	Kidding	The Death of Fil	PNP Officer
2020	The Order	New World Order Part 2	Edgar
2023	Dutch 2	Angel's Revenge	Atty. Thomas John Brown
