= Rebecca Mader =

English-American actress (born 1977)

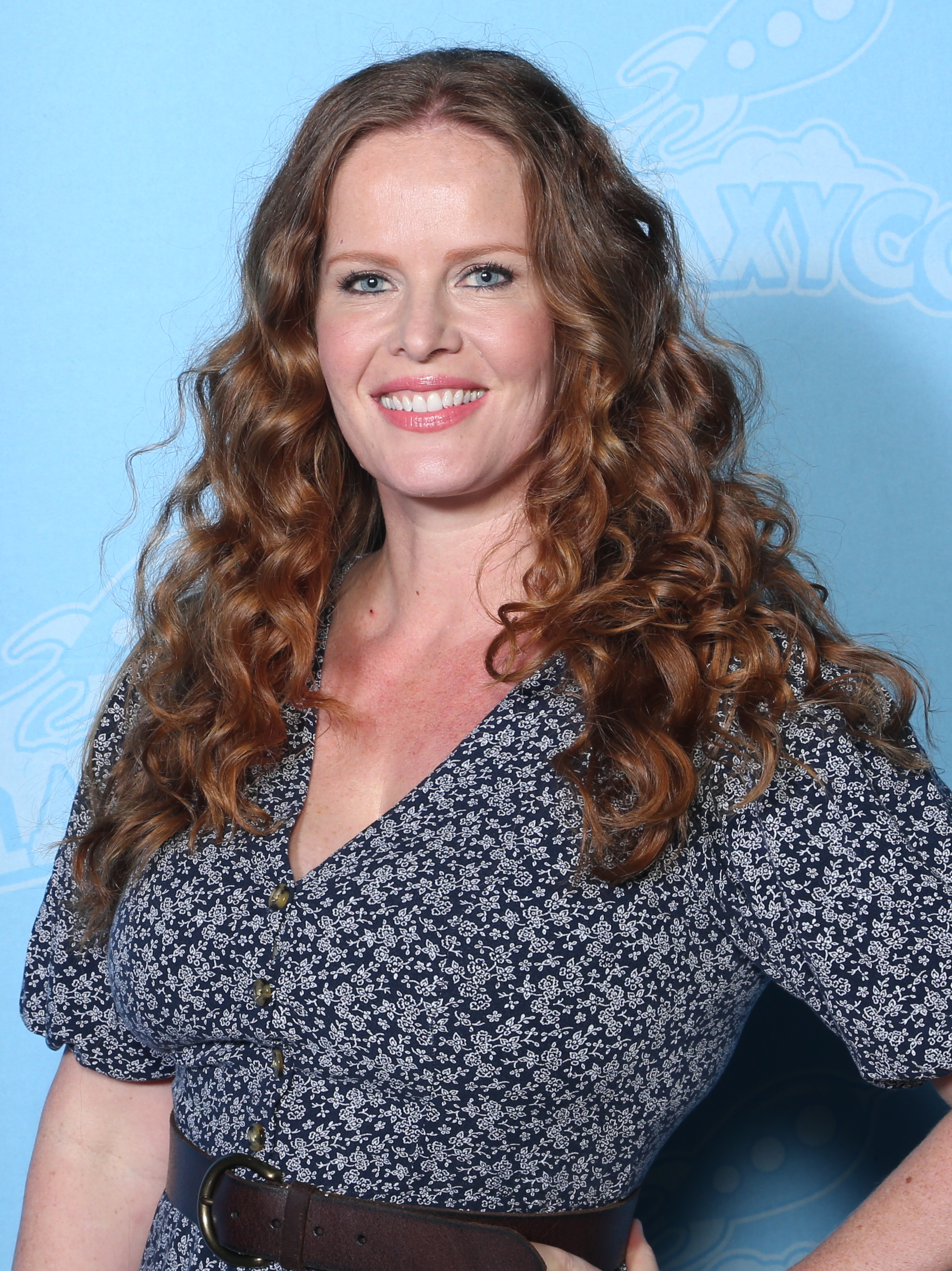
- Mader in 2022
- Born: Rebecca Leigh Mader; 24 April 1977 (age 49); Cambridge, England
- Occupations: Actress; producer
- Years active: 2000–present
- Spouses: Joseph Arongino (?–2008; div.); Marcus Kayne (m. 2016)
- Children: 2

Rebecca Leigh Mader (born 24 April 1977) is an English actress, best known for her roles as Charlotte Lewis in the ABC series Lost, and as Zelena, the Wicked Witch of the West, on ABC's Once Upon a Time.

== Life and career ==
Mader was born in 1977 in Cambridge, England. She worked as a model in New York City for a year, appearing in adverts for L'Oréal, Colgate and Wella Hair. She began her television career on the ABC daytime soap operas All My Children as Morgan Gordon, and One Life to Live as Margaret Cochran. She also appeared on the soap opera Guiding Light in 2003.

Also in 2003, Mader began acting in films, with Mimic 3: Sentinel, a direct-to-DVD sequel. Hitch two years later, was her first theatrical release, albeit without a credit. In 2006 she had a small role in The Devil Wears Prada as Jocelyn, the assistant editor whose suggestion for a story about springtime floral prints draws a withering reply from Meryl Streep's Miranda Priestley.

Mader has made a number of guest appearances on television shows. In 2006, she had a series regular role on the short-lived Fox legal drama Justice. In 2008, Mader began starring as anthropologist Charlotte Lewis on ABC series Lost. She appeared in the show from 2008 to 2009 and in two episodes in 2010. In 2011, she had a recurring role on No Ordinary Family, and in 2012, she made a guest starring appearance on the Fox science-fiction series Fringe as Jessica Holt. Also in 2012, Mader starred in the short-lived ABC comedy series Work It.

In June 2013, Mader made her stage debut in the role of Barrie in the one-act comedy The Third Date at the Hollywood Fringe Festival.

In December 2013, Mader was cast as the Wicked Witch of the West, a new antagonist for the second half of the third season of Once Upon a Time. She also made guest appearances during the second half of the fourth season and was later promoted to a series regular for the fifth and sixth seasons. In May 2017, Mader announced that she would not be returning for the seventh season of the show due to a creative decision by the showrunners. However, in September 2017, it was announced that Mader would be reprising her role as Zelena in a recurring capacity for the second half of the seventh season. In all, she made seven appearances in the seventh season, including the series finale "Leaving Storybrooke".

In May 2020, during the COVID-19 lockdown in California, Mader created the "At Home with Sean and Bex" interview series on YouTube with Once Upon a Time co-star Sean Maguire.

== Personal life ==
Mader's first husband was businessman Joseph Arongino. They divorced in 2008.

On 29 December 2014, Mader announced her engagement to producer Marcus Kayne. The two were married on 23 November 2016 and she gave birth to their first child in 2019. Mader announced the birth of her second child in 2021.

== Filmography ==
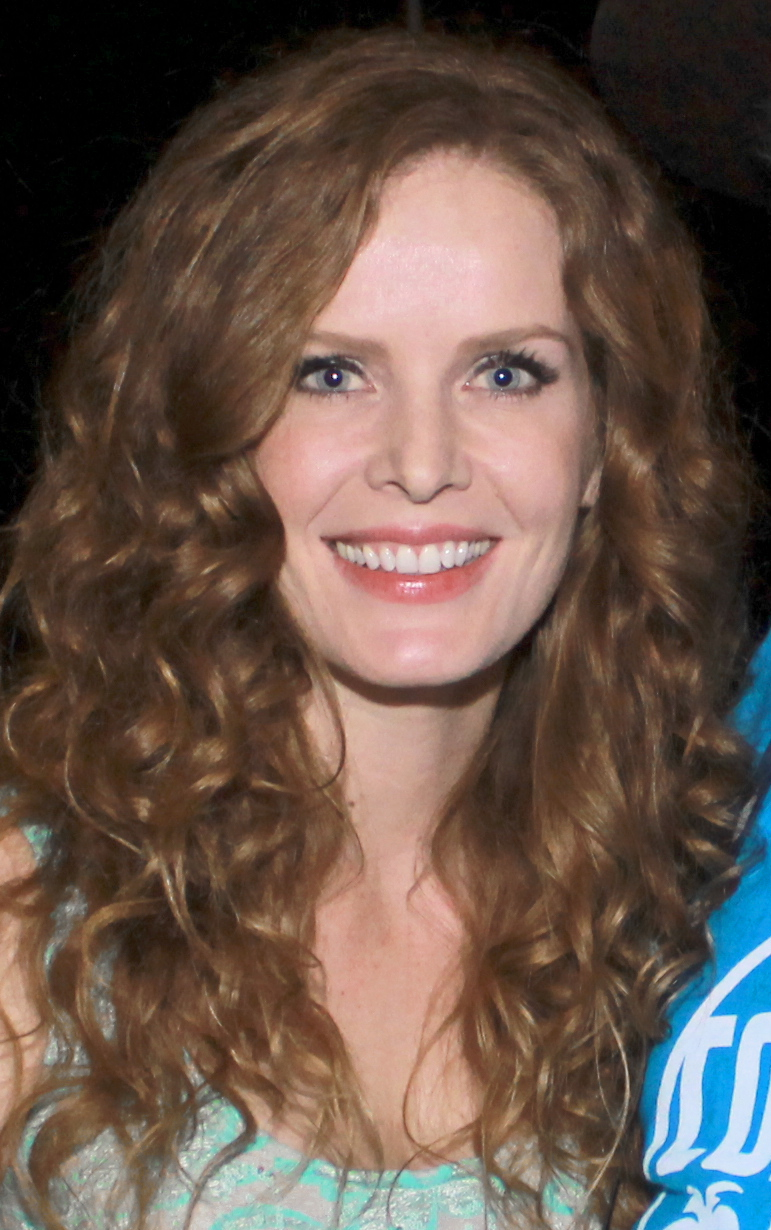
Mader at Magic City Comic Con in January 2015

=== Film ===
| Year | Title | Role | Notes |
|---|---|---|---|
| 2003 | Mimic 3: Sentinel | Carmen | Direct-to-video |
| 2003 | Replay | Belinda Brown | |
| 2005 | Hitch | Uncredited Cameo | |
| 2006 | The Devil Wears Prada | Jocelyn | |
| 2007 | Great World of Sound | Pam | |
| 2008 | The Rainbow Tribe | Mrs. Murray | |
| 2008 | Into the East | Felicity Young | |
| 2009 | The Men Who Stare at Goats | Debora Wilton | |
| 2010 | Ceremony | Esme Ball | |
| 2010 | The Big Bang | Zooey Wigner | |
| 2011 | Cougars, Inc. | Mary | |
| 2013 | Iron Man 3 | Sweat shop agent | |
| 2014 | It's Gawd! | Holly | |

=== Television ===
| Year | Title | Role | Notes |
|---|---|---|---|
| 2000 | Madigan Men | Kim | Episode: "Bachelors" |
| 2001 | Third Watch | Mandy | Episode: "Exposing Faith" |
| 2003 | All My Children | Morgan Gordan | Series regular; 17 episodes |
| 2003 | Fastlane | Nicole Martin | Episode: "Monster" |
| 2003 | Guiding Light | Tony's Mystery Woman | 2 episodes |
| 2004 | One Life to Live | Margaret Cochran | Series regular |
| 2004 | Samantha: An American Girl Holiday | Aunt Cornelia | TV film |
| 2005 | Law & Order: Trial by Jury | Melanie Ferris | Episode: "The Abominable Showman" |
| 2005 | Stella | Pretty Girl | Episode: "Meeting Girls" |
| 2005 | Starved | Puma Girl / Heather | Episodes: "Pilot", "3D" |
| 2006 | Conviction | Hannah | Episode: "Breakup" |
| 2006 | Love Monkey | Grace | 3 episodes |
| 2006–2007 | Justice | Alden Tuller | Main role |
| 2007 | Mr. and Mrs. Smith | Jordan | TV pilot |
| 2007 | Private Practice | Leslie | Episodes: "In Which We Meet Addison, a Nice Girl from Somewhere Else" |
| 2008–2010 | Lost | Charlotte Lewis | Main role (seasons 4–5); starring (season 6) |
| 2009 | Ring of Deceit | Madison Byrne | TV film |
| 2010 | Law & Order: LA | Rebecca Townley | Episode: "Pasadena" |
| 2011 | Second City This Week | Celebrity Guest | Episode: "Pilot" |
| 2011 | No Ordinary Family | Victoria Morrow | Recurring role |
| 2011 | Covert Affairs | Franka | Episode: "Half a World Away" |
| 2011 | Friends with Benefits | Ariel | Episode: "The Benefit of Avoiding the Mindbanger" |
| 2011 | Alphas | Griffin | Episode: "Blind Spot" |
| 2012 | Work It | Grace Hudson | Main role |
| 2012 | Fringe | Jessica Holt | Episodes: "Brave New World: Part 1", "Brave New World: Part 2" |
| 2012 | White Collar | Abigail Kincaid | Episode: "Honour Among Thieves" |
| 2012 | 30 Rock | Super Hot Lady | Episode: "My Whole Life Is Thunder" |
| 2013 | Drop Dead Diva | Mistress Robin | Episode: "Jane's Secret Revealed" |
| 2014 | Warehouse 13 | Lisa Da Vinci | Episode: "Endless Terror" |
| 2014 | Blue Bloods | Tori Parsons | Episode: "Most Wanted" |
| 2014–2018 | Once Upon a Time | Zelena; Wicked Witch of the West | Recurring role (seasons 3–4, 7); main role (seasons 5–6) |
| 2015 | Hawaii Five-0 | Nicole Booth | Episode: "Ua'aihue" |
| 2023 | Fire Country | Faye Stone | Recurring role (Season 1) |
| 2024 | Poppa's House | Susan Pierce | Episode: "School Days" |

=== Web ===
| Year | Title | Role | Notes |
|---|---|---|---|
| 2011 | Aim High | Miss Walker | 4 episodes |
