= List of awards and nominations received by Once Upon a Time =

Awards and nominations received by Once Upon a Time
Awards and nominations
Award	Wins	Nominations
BMI Film, TV & Visual Media Awards	1	1
Kids' Choice Awards	0	4
Leo Awards	1	3
People's Choice Awards	0	12
Primetime Emmy Awards	0	7
Saturn Awards	0	4
Teen Choice Awards	3	16
TV Guide Awards	3	6
Visual Effects Society Awards	0	4

Totals (Note: Certain award groups do not simply award one winner. They acknowledge several different recipients, have runners-up, and have third place. Since this is a specific recognition and is different from losing an award, runner-up mentions are considered wins in this award tally. For simplification and to avoid errors, each award in this list has been presumed to have had a prior nomination.)
- Wins: 12
- Nominations: 86

Once Upon a Time is an American fairy tale drama television series created by Edward Kitsis and Adam Horowitz. The show, which ran for seven seasons from 2011 to 2018, is primarily set in the fictional seaside town of Storybrooke, Maine, whose residents are characters from various fairy tales transported to the "real world" town and robbed of their real memories by a powerful curse. It borrows elements and characters from various Disney franchises and popular Western literature, folklore, and fairy tales. It has been nominated for a variety of different awards, including the Primetime Emmy Awards, Satellite Award, Saturn Award, People's Choice Awards, and Teen Choice Awards. In total, Once Upon a Time has been nominated for 91 awards and won 12.

== Total nominations and awards for the cast ==
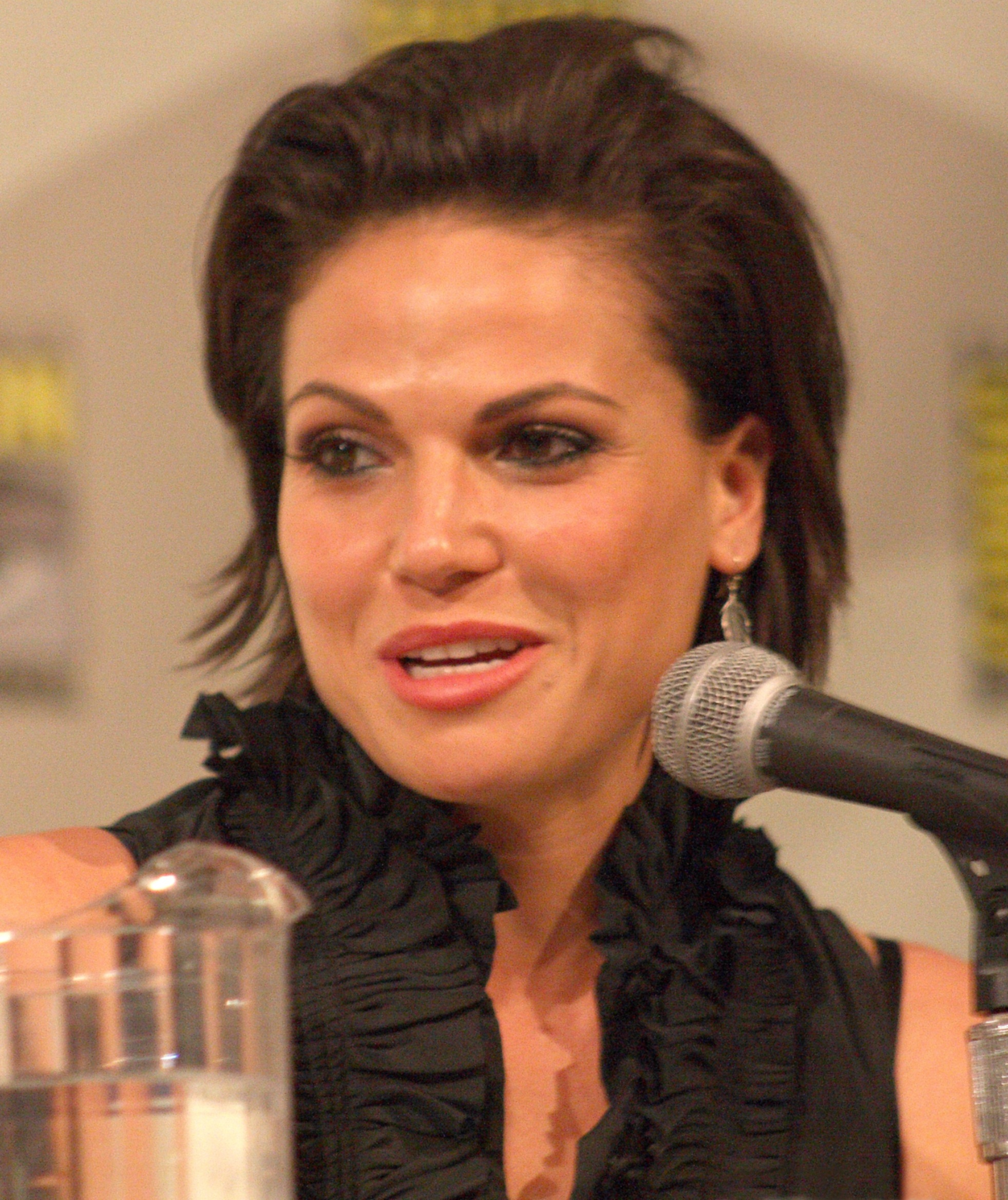
Lana Parrilla received a nomination for Best Supporting Actress on Television from the 38th Saturn Awards.

Actor	Character	Nominations	Awards
Lana Parrilla	Evil Queen / Regina Mills	10	4
Jennifer Morrison	Emma Swan / Dark Swan	11	1
Jared Gilmore	Henry Mills	3	1
Colin O'Donoghue	Captain Hook / Killian Jones	5	1
Ginnifer Goodwin	Snow White / Mary Margaret Blanchard	8	0
Josh Dallas	Prince Charming / David Nolan	3	0
Victoria Smurfit	Cruella De Vil	1	0
Keegan Connor Tracy	Blue Fairy / Mother Superior	1	0
Michael Raymond-James	Baelfire / Neal Cassidy	1	0
Robbie Kay	Peter Pan	1	0
Greg Germann	Hades	1	0

== Awards and nominations ==
Awards and nominations received by Once Upon a Time
Award	Year	Category	Nominee(s)	Result	Ref.
ALMA Awards	2012	Favorite Television Actress - Drama	Lana Parrilla	Won	
BMI Film & Television Awards	2013	BMI TV Music award	Mark Isham	Won	
Casting Society Awards	2012	Outstanding Achievement in Casting - Television Pilot - Drama	Veronica Collins Rooney, Corinne Clark, and Jennifer Page	Nominated	
Costume Designers Guild Awards	2012	Outstanding Period/Fantasy Television Series	Eduardo Castro	Nominated	
Costume Designers Guild Awards	2016	Outstanding Fantasy Television Series	Eduardo Castro	Nominated	
Costume Designers Guild Awards	2017	Outstanding Fantasy Television Series	Eduardo Castro	Nominated	
Costume Designers Guild Awards	2018	Outstanding Sci-Fi/Fantasy Television Series	Eduardo Castro	Nominated	
Imagen Awards	2013	Best Actress in a Television Series	Lana Parrilla	Nominated	
Irish Film and Television Awards	2016	Best Actress in a Supporting Role in a Drama	Victoria Smurfit	Nominated	
The Joey Awards	2015	Best Actress in a Television Drama Guest Starring Role Age 9-12 Years	Milli Wilkinson	Won	
The Joey Awards	2017	Best Principal or Guest Starring Actor in a Television Series 7-10 Years	Luke Roessier	Nominated	
Leo Awards	2012	Best Guest Performance by a Female in a Dramatic Series	Keegan Connor Tracy	Nominated	
Leo Awards	2014	Best Visual Effects in a Dramatic Series	Jonathan MacPherson, Blake Andereson, Kornel Farkas, Tim Palgut, and Dan Weir	Nominated	
Leo Awards	2015	Best Make-Up in a Dramatic Series	Juliana Vit, Andrea Manchur, and Elisabeth Jolliffe	Won	
Nickelodeon Kids' Choice Awards	2015	Favorite Family Television Show	Once Upon a Time	Nominated	
Nickelodeon Kids' Choice Awards	2015	Favorite Television Actress	Jennifer Morrison	Nominated	
Nickelodeon Kids' Choice Awards	2016	Favorite Family Television Show	Once Upon a Time	Nominated	
Nickelodeon Kids' Choice Awards	2016	Favorite Television Actress	Jennifer Morrison	Nominated	
People's Choice Awards	2012	Favorite New Television Drama	Once Upon a Time	Nominated	
People's Choice Awards	2013	Favorite Network Television Drama	Once Upon a Time	Nominated	
People's Choice Awards	2013	Favorite Sci-Fi/Fantasy Television Show	Once Upon a Time	Nominated	
People's Choice Awards	2013	Favorite Television Fan Following	Oncers	Nominated	
People's Choice Awards	2014	Favorite Sci-Fi/Fantasy Television Show	Once Upon a Time	Nominated	
People's Choice Awards	2014	Favorite On-Screen Chemistry	Jennifer Morrison and Colin O'Donoghue	Nominated	
People's Choice Awards	2015	Favorite Television Show	Once Upon a Time	Nominated	
People's Choice Awards	2015	Favorite Network Sci-Fi/Fantasy Television Show	Once Upon a Time	Nominated	
People's Choice Awards	2015	Favorite Television Duo	Ginnifer Goodwin and Josh Dallas	Nominated	
People's Choice Awards	2015	Favorite Television Character We Miss Most	Michael Raymond-James	Nominated	
People's Choice Awards	2017	Favorite Network Sci-Fi/Fantasy Television Show	Once Upon a Time	Nominated	
People's Choice Awards	2018	The Sci-Fi/Fantasy Show of 2018	Once Upon a Time	Nominated	
Primetime Creative Arts Emmy Awards	2012	Outstanding Special Visual Effects	Andrew Orloff, Laura Jones, Phil Jones, Jacob Bergman, Nathan Matsuda, Dale Fay, Kevin Struckman, and Sallyanne Massimini (for "The Stranger")	Nominated	
Primetime Creative Arts Emmy Awards	2012	Outstanding Prosthetic Makeup for a Series, Miniseries, Movie or Special	Toby Lindala and Sarah Graham (for "Dreamy")	Nominated	
Primetime Creative Arts Emmy Awards	2012	Outstanding Costumes for a Series	Eduardo Castro and Monique McRae (for "Hat Trick")	Nominated	
Primetime Creative Arts Emmy Awards	2013	Outstanding Makeup for a Single-Camera Series (Non-Prosthetic)	Sarah Graham, Juliana Vit, and Naomi Bakstad (for "The Evil Queen")	Nominated	
Primetime Creative Arts Emmy Awards	2013	Outstanding Costumes for a Series	Eduardo Castro and Monique McRae (for "Queen of Hearts")	Nominated	
Primetime Creative Arts Emmy Awards	2014	Outstanding Costumes for a Series	Eduardo Castro and Monique McRae (for "A Curious Thing")	Nominated	
Primetime Creative Arts Emmy Awards	2018	Outstanding Music Composition for a Series (Original Dramatic Score)	Mark Isham, Cindy O'Connor, and Michael Simon (for "Leaving Storybrooke")	Nominated	
Satellite Awards	2011	Best Television Series - Genre	Once Upon a Time	Nominated	
Satellite Awards	2012	Best Television Series - Genre	Once Upon a Time	Nominated	
Satellite Awards	2013	Best Television Series - Genre	Once Upon a Time	Nominated	
Saturn Awards	2012	Best Network Television Series	Once Upon a Time	Nominated	
Saturn Awards	2012	Best Supporting Actress on Television	Lana Parrilla	Nominated	
Saturn Awards	2013	Best Network Television Series	Once Upon a Time	Nominated	
Saturn Awards	2014	Best Performance by a Younger Actor in a Television Series	Jared S. Gilmore	Nominated	
Teen Choice Awards	2012	Choice Television Series - Fantasy/Sci-Fi	Once Upon a Time	Nominated	
Teen Choice Awards	2012	Choice Television Actress - Fantasy/Sci-Fi	Ginnifer Goodwin	Nominated	
Teen Choice Awards	2012	Choice Television Breakout Performance - Male	Josh Dallas	Nominated	
Teen Choice Awards	2012	Choice Television - Villain	Lana Parrilla	Nominated	
Teen Choice Awards	2013	Choice Television Series - Fantasy/Sci-Fi	Once Upon a Time	Nominated	
Teen Choice Awards	2013	Choice Television Actress - Fantasy/Sci-Fi	Ginnifer Goodwin	Nominated	
Teen Choice Awards	2013	Choice Television - Villain	Lana Parrilla	Nominated	
Teen Choice Awards	2014	Choice Television Series - Fantasy/Sci-Fi	Once Upon a Time	Nominated	
Teen Choice Awards	2014	Choice Television Actor - Fantasy/Sci-Fi	Josh Dallas	Nominated	
Teen Choice Awards	2014	Choice Television Actress - Fantasy/Sci-Fi	Ginnifer Goodwin	Nominated	
Teen Choice Awards	2014	Choice Television - Villain	Robbie Kay	Nominated	
Teen Choice Awards	2015	Choice Television Series - Fantasy/Sci-Fi	Once Upon a Time	Nominated	
Teen Choice Awards	2015	Choice Television Actress - Fantasy/Sci-Fi	Jennifer Morrison	Nominated	
Teen Choice Awards	2016	Choice Television - Liplock	Jennifer Morrison and Colin O'Donoghue	Won	
Teen Choice Awards	2016	Choice Television - Villain	Greg Germann	Nominated	
Teen Choice Awards	2016	Choice Television Actress - Fantasy/Sci-Fi	Lana Parrilla	Won	
Teen Choice Awards	2016	Choice TV Show - Fantasy/Sci-Fi	Once Upon a Time	Won	
TV Guide Awards	2012	Favorite New Series	Once Upon a Time	Won	
TV Guide Awards	2012	Favorite Villain	Lana Parrilla	Won	
TV Guide Awards	2013	Favorite Ensemble	Jennifer Morrison Ginnifer Goodwin, Lana Parrilla, Josh Dallas, Jared S. Gilmore, and Robert Carlyle	Nominated	
TV Guide Awards	2013	Favorite Villain	Lana Parrilla	Nominated	
TV Guide Awards	2014	Favorite Sci-Fi/Fantasy Show	Once Upon a Time	Nominated	
TV Guide Awards	2014	Favorite Villain	Lana Parrilla	Won	
TV Quick Awards	2012	Best New Drama	Adam Horowitz Edward Kitsis	Nominated	
Visual Effects Society Awards	2012	Outstanding Virtual Cinematography in a Broadcast Program or Special	Nathan Matsuda, Stephen Jackson, Kevin Struckman, and Sallyanne Massimini	Nominated	
Visual Effects Society Awards	2012	Outstanding Models in a Broadcast Program or Commercial	Jason O. Monroe, Chris Strauss, Michael Kirylo, and Jeremy Melton	Nominated	
Visual Effects Society Awards	2012	Outstanding Visual Effects in a Broadcast Series	Nathan Overstom, Laura Jones, Andrew Orloff, and Doug Ludwif	Nominated	
Visual Effects Society Awards	2013	Outstanding Visual Effects in a Broadcast Series	Nathan Overstom, Laura Jones, Andrew Orloff, and Doug Ludwif	Nominated	
Young Artist Awards	2012	Best Performance in a Television Series - Leading Young Actor	Jared S. Gilmore	Won	
Young Artist Awards	2012	Best Performance in a Television Series (Comedy or Drama) - Leading Young Actor	Dylan Everett Jared S. Gilmore	Won	
Young Artist Awards	2013	Best Performance in a Television Series (Comedy or Drama) - Leading Young Actor	Jared S. Gilmore	Nominated	
Young Artist Awards	2013	Best Performance in a Television Series - Guest Starring Young Actor 11-13	Quinn Lord	Nominated	
Young Artist Awards	2016	Best Performance in a Television Series - Supporting Young Actor	Graham Verchere	Nominated	
Young Artist Awards	2016	Best Performance in a Television Series - Recurring Young Actress 14-21	Olivia Steele Falconer	Nominated	
