= The Heart of the Truest Believer =

- Once Upon a Time episode
- Episode no.: Season 3 Episode 1
- Directed by: Ralph Hemecker
- Written by: Edward Kitsis; Adam Horowitz
- Production code: 301
- Original air date: September 29, 2013

Guest appearances
- Sarah Bolger as Aurora; Jamie Chung as Mulan; Julian Morris as Prince Phillip; Ethan Embry as Greg Mendell; Sean Maguire as Robin Hood; Robbie Kay as Fugitive Boy/Peter Pan; Sonequa Martin-Green as Tamara; Parker Croft as Felix; Natasha Wilson as Mermaid; David Mathews as Doctor; Joy Castro as Nurse

Episode chronology
← Previous "And Straight On 'til Morning"	Next → "Lost Girl"
- Once Upon a Time (season 3)

"The Heart of the Truest Believer" is the third season premiere of the American fantasy drama series Once Upon a Time. It was first broadcast on September 29, 2013.

This episode features the show's core characters journeying to Neverland in hopes of rescuing Henry (Jared S. Gilmore), who was captured by Greg (Ethan Embry) and Tamara (Sonequa Martin-Green), before Peter Pan (Robbie Kay) can get his hands on him. While doing so, the characters must learn to co-operate during a dangerous storm. Meanwhile, Neal (Michael Raymond-James) tries to find a way out of the Enchanted Forest in order to save Emma Swan (Jennifer Morrison) from the dangers that lie ahead for her.

The episode received generally positive reviews from critics, and was watched by 8.45 million viewers, down considerably from the second season premiere "Broken".

== Title card ==
Two boys clumsily fly through the Enchanted Forest.

== Plot ==
=== In the Characters' Past ===
The episode opens eleven years prior in 2002, with Emma Swan giving birth to Henry. As he is born, the lights in the hospital begin flickering and fading. The doctor tells Emma that she can change her mind about giving the baby up for adoption, but Emma turns her face away and replies that she cannot be a mother.

=== In Neverland ===
Emma, Mary Margaret, David, Regina, Gold, and Hook arrive in Neverland aboard the Jolly Roger via the portal from the magic bean. Gold admonishes Emma for not having enough belief, which is essential to have in a place like Neverland, and leaves the party via magic to search for Henry on the island himself. Emma holds Mary Margaret and David accountable for what has happened, believing that she should never have broken the curse and simply left Storybrooke with Henry. Hook commiserates with her over the loss of Neal, but their mourning is interrupted by an attack on the Jolly Roger by mermaids. Mary Margaret and Emma catch one in a net, while Regina drives the others away with fire. The makeshift crew argues among themselves about what to do with the mermaid, who summons a storm with a conch shell. The storm continues to worsen, and Regina turns the mermaid into a wooden statue. Further arguing makes Mary Margaret finally release her years of rage against Regina and the two fight, prompting David to attempt to break it up but get himself drawn into a fight with Hook. Emma realizes that their strife is causing the storm, echoing the mermaid's warning that they would kill themselves. In order to force them to cooperate, she dives overboard and is knocked out by a pulley that has fallen from the ship's rigging. The plan works as everyone puts aside their differences to help David get into the water to rescue her. The storm clears up and the Jolly Roger is able to approach the island. Despite Hook's earlier plan of making their way around the island and catching the Lost Boys by surprise, Emma elects to lead the crew on a direct assault route, declaring that they must believe in each other in order for them to succeed in Neverland.

Meanwhile, Henry is taken by Greg and Tamara through the jungle. Henry points out their unfounded trust in Peter Pan, a statement which begins to worry them when they discover the walkie-talkie they use to communicate with the Home Office is filled with sand. The Lost Boys soon find them, and reveal themselves to be the Home Office Greg and Tamara worked for, much to their displeasure. The leader of the Lost Boys, Felix, reveals that the plan was never to destroy magic, and that Greg and Tamara aren't meant to return to their world. The Shadow arrives and rips Greg's shadow from his body, killing him, when he refuses to hand over Henry, and Tamara is shot in the back with an arrow. Henry flees in the confusion and is taken aside by a fellow runaway. The runaway reveals that he was a former Lost Boy and stole pixie dust from Pan, hoping to escape from Neverland. However, he cannot make himself fly with it. Gold arrives at the scene of the skirmish and finds Tamara still alive. He heals her with magic, and she tells him that Henry ran, and that she and Greg had no idea that they were working for Pan. She also apologizes about Neal, but Gold rips out and crushes her heart. He and Felix meet in a clearing, with Felix welcoming Gold but warning him that if he is in Neverland for Henry, that makes him Pan's enemy. Rumpelstiltskin remarks that nothing has changed, and scoffs at the idea of his survival, only wanting to take down as many Lost Boys as he can before he dies. Felix responds by leaving behind a doll of a child, which reduces Rumpelstiltskin to tears.

Henry and the runaway attempt to find the Echo Caves, where the Lost Boys will not be able to track them, but come to a ravine. Henry takes the pixie dust, and has enough belief in its power to allow him to fly. The runaway reveals that he himself is Peter Pan, and that he has been seeking the heart of the truest believer, which resides in Henry. Pan signals the Lost Boys, who surround Henry.

=== In the Enchanted Forest ===
Neal wakes up in the same place where Aurora woke from her sleeping curse, being tended to by her, Prince Phillip, and Mulan. When Neal reveals that he knows Emma, Aurora tries to communicate with Henry through the Netherworld via the sleeping curse. When she is unsuccessful, Neal and Mulan set out for Rumpelstiltskin's castle, hoping to find something to lead them to Emma and Henry. When they arrive there, they meet Robin Hood, who had taken up residence in the castle, but allows them to search for what they seek to repay the life debt he owes Rumpelstiltskin. Finding his father's old staff, Neal manages to uncover a concealed cabinet full of magical objects, including a crystal ball that tells him that Emma is in Neverland.

== Cultural references ==
The opening scene in this episode featured a clock in the hospital stopping at 8:15, another reference to Peter Pan.

Also, a Disney-related fourth wall was broken in this episode when Neal mentioned to Mulan that they made a movie about her and told her, Aurora, and Phillip that the outside world considers them fairy tale characters.

== Production ==
On July 2, 2013, Adam Horowitz revealed the title of the episode through Twitter. ABC released the first promo for the season on August 13.

Edward Kitsis stated that the first few episodes of the season would focus on Peter Pan and his intentions for Henry, "but like any good mystery, you won't know the whole picture until you watch the whole 11 episodes."

== Reception ==
=== Ratings ===
This episode posted a 2.6/7 among 18-49s with 8.52 million viewers tuning in, down 33 percent from the second season opening episode "Broken" but was up 13 percent from the second season finale. In addition, this outing was also the top social broadcast series of the evening with 136,627 tweets, the highest number ever for the show. Based on Nielsen’s Live + 3 Day playback data for Sunday, the episode was marked the day's top broadcast series in Adults 18-49, moving ahead of Fox’s NFL premiere of The Simpsons. Viewers for the episode increased 1.8 million to 10.3, whilst the Adults 18-49 rating increased to 3.5 from 2.6.

In Canada, the episode was watched by 1.285 million viewers.

=== Critical reception ===
The premiere episode received generally positive reviews from critics.

Amy Ratcliffe of IGN gave the episode a score of 8 out of 10; she praised its humor and use of Rumpelstiltskin, explaining that the writers "keep his true motivations hidden and separating Rumple from the group gives him the opportunity to shine. Robert Carlyle owned the character in a way he never has before. His flourishes and 'dearies' didn't seem out of place and he even played with them a bit." Ratcliffe also positively received Peter Pan's introduction, saying "I appreciate how they've flipped Peter Pan from a lighthearted boy to a master manipulator with questionable intentions. This show is at its brightest when it thinks out of the storybook in that way."

Liane Bonin Starr of HitFix also gave the episode a positive review, opining that "the show kicks off with one [fairy tale] I think (and hope) will not only be great, naughty fun but will also help to aggregate storylines that started to feel scattered and rambling last season." Alyse Whitney of Wetpaint praised the beginning scene with Emma giving birth, saying "the one standout moment was in the first minutes, showcasing Jennifer Morrison’s best acting to date. As Emma gave birth to Henry — and the electricity flickered, which could be a hint at her magic — and then refused to see him since she "can’t be a mother," our hearts sank. It was an emotional way to kick things off, but was the perfect way to show how far she’s come as she heads to save Henry with everyone on the Jolly Roger."

Hillary Busis of Entertainment Weekly compared Peter Pan to King Joffrey from Game of Thrones, saying "It's a shame Storybrooke doesn't get HBO. If Henry paid attention to Theon's story in the season 3 episode "And Now His Watch Is Ended" (or read George R. R. Martin's books, for that matter), he might have been a bit more reluctant to trust the kid who conveniently showed up right after the Lost Boys took out Greg and Tamara -- a kid who, to nobody's surprise but Henry's, turns out to be Peter Pan himself." Not all reviews were as positive, however; Gwen Ihnat of The A.V. Club gave the episode a B− rating, signaling mixed reviews. She said "On the way to Neverland, unfortunately, OUAT's season-three premiere gets immediately bogged down in family issues, an area where these Storybrookers have loads of problems."
