= The Miller's Daughter (Once Upon a Time) =

- Once Upon a Time episode
- Episode no.: Season 2 Episode 16
- Directed by: Ralph Hemecker
- Written by: Jane Espenson
- Original air date: March 10, 2013

Guest appearances
- Joaquim de Almeida as King Xavier; Barbara Hershey as Cora/The Queen of Hearts; Rose McGowan as young Cora; Michael Raymond-James as Baelfire/Neal Cassidy; Zak Santiago as Prince Henry

Episode chronology
← Previous "The Queen Is Dead"	Next → "Welcome to Storybrooke"
- Once Upon a Time season 2

"The Miller's Daughter" is the 16th episode of the second season of the American ABC fantasy drama television series Once Upon a Time, and the show's 38th episode overall. It aired on March 10, 2013.

It was written by Jane Espenson and directed by Ralph Hemecker.

This episode centers around Cora as she tries to kill Mr. Gold, while flashbacks show her past with Rumplestiltskin.

== Title card ==
A spinning wheel stands in the Enchanted Forest.

== Plot ==
=== In the characters' past ===
A young Cora (Rose McGowan) admonishes her father, a drunkard miller, and delivers flour to the palace in his stead. Princess Eva, a young woman, trips Cora, causing her to spill the flour. King Xavier (Joaquim de Almeida) refuses to pay for the flour and orders Cora to beg forgiveness on her knees. (This explains Cora's hereafter hatred for Snow White and her family, because Princess Eva is Snow White's future mother.)

That night, Cora sneaks into a masked ball held for King Xavier's son Prince Henry (Zak Santiago). She criticizes the event as an opportunity for the king to sell his son to a wealthy bride, and is overheard by Henry himself. The prince invites her to dance, but they are interrupted by the king, who recognizes Cora. He tells her that he is superior to her, despite his kingdom's financial woes, and that she has nothing to offer him. Cora untruthfully boasts that she can turn straw to gold, but will deny the king this gift because of his insults. King Xavier presents her to the ball with her claim. Cora claims she needs time to prepare, so he has her locked in a tower full of straw to spin into gold by morning; she can marry Henry if she succeeds, but will be put to death if she fails.

As Cora considers jumping from the tower window, Rumplestiltskin (Robert Carlyle) appears. He demonstrates that he can spin straw into gold, and offers to do so in exchange for her first-born child; he reveals that "she is very important" in the future he has seen. Cora asks Rumplestiltskin to teach her how to spin gold herself; to which he agrees and she signs his contract. Rumplestiltskin teaches Cora that magic is channeled through emotion rather than thought, and that he uses the anger he felt at being forced to kiss a man's boots in front of his son. As Cora imagines forcing the royals to bow to her, the straw changes to gold in her hands. Cora presents the gold to the King and accepts Henry's resultant marriage proposal.

The day before her wedding, Cora questions her plans; she is unlikely to become queen as Henry is fifth in line to the throne, while Rumplestiltskin, with whom she has been having an affair, offers her love. They agree to amend the contract so Cora owes Rumplestiltskin his child. He also agrees to teach her how to take a heart, so that she can kill King Xavier. That night, she confronts the king. He reveals that he knows of her relationship with Rumplestiltskin; telling her that "love is weakness," he lays out her choice between love and power. Cora returns to her room carrying a heart in a box. Later, she meets Rumplestilskin and informs him that she did not take the king's heart, and that she is going to marry the prince instead of running away with Rumplestiltskin. The heart she removed was her own, to prevent it from being an obstacle. Rumplestiltskin tries to invoke their contract, but she points out that he only has a claim on his own child, which she will never bear.

Some time later, Cora, now a princess, presents her and Henry's newborn daughter to the court. As everyone bows, she declares the baby's name as Regina, "for one day, she will be queen."

=== In Storybrooke ===
Rumplestiltskin's name is fading from the Dark One's dagger, signifying that Gold is dying. Since Gold's death would cause the Dark One's powers to cease to exist, Cora decides her only option is to kill Gold with the dagger and become the Dark One herself. Regina questions Cora's motives, as Henry would never forgive them if Cora openly murders Emma Swan's family. Cora insists she is protecting their family.

Neal (Michael Raymond-James) and Henry (Jared S. Gilmore) pilot the Jolly Roger into Storybrooke, while Emma (Jennifer Morrison) promises to save Mr. Gold from the poison Hook inflicted on him, as he is now family. Mary Margaret (Ginnifer Goodwin) and David (Josh Dallas) meet them at the dock. Mary Margaret still intends to kill Cora, despite David's insistence that she couldn't live with herself if she did that. Ruby takes Henry to safety, while the others go to Gold's shop. There, Gold instructs Emma on creating a magical barrier with invisible chalk, and she and Neal bicker while she does so. Gold leads Mary Margaret to find that he has the magical candle that Cora had given her years earlier, which can save a life by causing another person's death. He asks her to use it to save him, and she agrees once she realizes she can use the candle to kill Cora. With Gold's guidance, Emma taps into her emotions to cast the protection spell.

Cora and Regina arrive at the shop and overcome the protection spell. While David, Neal, and Emma stand against them, Mary Margaret sneaks away to Regina's mausoleum and uses the candle to curse Cora's heart. Regina follows after Cora senses that someone is there. Emma and Neal retreat to the back room, where she casts a new protection spell. Believing he will die, Gold asks to call Belle (Emilie de Ravin). Although Belle still doesn't remember Gold, she is moved when he tells her he loves her, and that she is a hero for loving a monster like him. He says that she inspires him to be his best self. Neal is surprised to hear such heartfelt words from his father, who then also apologizes to him. Neal affirms that he is still angry, but he tearfully embraces Gold.

Regina discovers Mary Margaret at the mausoleum. Mary Margaret gives Regina Cora's heart, explaining that all of their problems are caused by Cora's inability to love Regina or anyone else without her heart inside her. David later finds Mary Margaret there in a state of shock over her own actions.

As Gold nears death, Cora breaks through Emma's spell and magically sends Emma and Neal away. Gold asks Cora if she ever loved him. She admits that she did, and that was why she had to remove her heart; he had become her weakness. Cora is about to kill him with the dagger when Regina restores her heart. A beaming Cora experiences one joyous moment of pure love for her daughter before succumbing to the poison of which Gold has just been cured. She dies in Regina's arms, acknowledging with her last words that a loving relationship with her would have fulfilled her life in a way that power couldn't. Gold reclaims the dagger. Mary Margaret rushes in to try to stop Regina, although she is too late. A heartbroken and despondent Regina, clenching her mother, looks at Snow bitterly saying: "You did this."

== Production ==
"The Miller's Daughter" was written by consulting producer Jane Espenson, while being directed by V alum Ralph Hemecker.

== Reception ==
=== Ratings ===
Ratings and viewership were slightly up from the previous episode. "The Miller's Daughter" had an 18-49 rating of 2.3/6 and was seen by 7.64 million viewers.

=== Reviews ===
The episode received excellent reviews from critics. Praise went to Espenson's script, the new take on the tale of Rumpelstiltskin, and the performances of Carlyle, Hershey, and especially McGowan, who many reviewers felt should have been nominated for an Emmy Award for Outstanding Guest Actress in a Drama Series, but was not.

Oliver Sava of The A.V. Club gave this episode an "A−" and wrote, "There are a lot of very talented writers working on Once Upon A Time, but this show’s limitations prevent them from reaching their full potential. Jane Espenson did great work on Buffy the Vampire Slayer and Battlestar Galactica, but her episodes of this series have been largely lackluster. That is, until 'The Miller’s Daughter,' which is easily one of the strongest episodes OUAT has ever had. Exploring Cora’s past and shutting the door on her present-day exploits, this episode is full of significant plot developments and emotional character moments, with a very strong connection between the fairyback and Storybrooke scenes." He also praised the performance from Rose McGowan calling her "inspired casting as young Cora, and not just because of how much she looks like Barbara Hershey. She has an icy demeanor that is perfect for the youthful version of this season’s Big Bad, hiding her potential power behind a suit of armor that protects from the cruel nobility she delivers flour to. When she’s tripped by a princess and forced to bow and apologize, she’s filled with the rage that is essential for making magic happen. She sneaks into a ball that is intended to find the prince a wife, but the king sees through her disguise and threatens her until she says that she can spin straw into gold. She’s locked in the tower, setting the stage for Rumplestiltskin to appear and give Cora a taste of the power that will drive her over the edge."

Amy Ratcliffe of IGN rated this episode 9.5 out of 10.
