= Lacey (Once Upon a Time) =

- Once Upon a Time episode
- Episode no.: Season 2 Episode 19
- Directed by: Milan Cheylov
- Written by: Edward Kitsis; Adam Horowitz
- Original air date: April 21, 2013

Guest appearances
- Sonequa Martin-Green as Tamara; Ethan Embry as Owen Flynn/Greg Mendell; Michael Raymond-James as Baelfire/Neal Cassidy; Tom Ellis as Robin Hood; Wil Traval as Keith/The Sheriff of Nottingham; Christie Laing as Marian; Jorge Garcia as Anton/Tiny; Beverley Elliot as Granny

Episode chronology
← Previous "Selfless, Brave and True"	Next → "The Evil Queen"
- Once Upon a Time season 2

"Lacey" is the 19th episode of the second season of the American ABC fantasy/drama television series Once Upon a Time, and the show's 41st episode overall. It aired on April 21, 2013.

In this episode, Mr. Gold goes on a date with Belle. In flashbacks, Rumpelstiltskin forces Belle to accompany him on his search to catch a thief.

It was co-written by Edward Kitsis and Adam Horowitz, while being directed by Milan Cheylov.

== Title card ==
Robin Hood shoots an arrow through the Enchanted Forest.

== Plot ==
=== In the Characters' Past ===
In the Enchanted Forest, soon after Belle has gone to live with Rumpelstiltskin, she cries at night and he gives her a pillow — not for comfort, but to stifle her sobs. They are interrupted by the sound of an intruder. Rumple captures a thief (Tom Ellis) who is trying to steal a magic wand, after being unharmed by the thief's magically unerring bow and arrow. Rumple locks him up and plans to torture him to death as an example to others. Belle fails to persuade him to let the thief go, so she releases him herself. He invites her to run away with him, but she stands by her pledge to serve Rumple. Rumple is enraged, and then shows Belle that the thief took the wand when he left. Belle still has faith in the possibility that the thief is a good person, saying that Rumple cannot know a person's heart without truly knowing the person. Rumple demands Belle accompany him in hunting down the thief with his own bow.

They track the thief to Sherwood Forest, where the Sheriff of Nottingham (Wil Traval) reveals, after Rumple magically takes his tongue when the man asks to have his way with Belle in exchange for information, that the thief is his own nemesis, Robin Hood, who stole his love. When Rumple and Belle finally see Robin Hood from a distance, Rumple magically imprisons Belle in the ground to force her to watch as he kills him. But after Robin Hood uses the wand to heal his pregnant and apparently deathly ill lover, Marian (Christie Laing), Belle begs Rumple not to leave the child fatherless. Rumple "misses" with his arrow and lets the couple escape. Receiving a warm hug from Belle for his change of heart, Rumple later delights her with access to his vast library, flippantly calling it just another room for her to clean.

=== In Storybrooke ===
During a dream, Mr Gold is holding a birthday party for Henry in front of family: David, Mary Margaret, Emma Swan, and Neal (Michael Raymond-James). When Henry picks a wand as his gift, Mr Gold turns him into a porcelain puppet and faces the wrath of the family. As he explains what the Seer told him, that "the boy would be [his] undoing," he smashes the porcelain Henry, only to wake up from what turns out to be a nightmare. As Mr Gold later watches Neal practice sword-fighting with Henry, Regina asks him what they are doing together. Noting that "apparently fate has a sense of humor," Gold explains that they're family because Neal is Henry's father. Annoyed, and thinking Gold was responsible for that happening, Regina responds, "If your own son couldn't bring out the good in you, who will?"

So Mr Gold turns to the only person who he feels will be a key to helping him feel loved by visiting Belle at the hospital, where she is happy to see him and hopes that he will help her remember who she was before the accident. However, Regina, who arrives moments before Mr Gold, makes sure that she does not remember by using a cursed matchbook that she plants on the floor. The matchbook gives her her curse memories of being Lacey, a scantily-dressed barfly. Mr. Gold is furious that Regina interfered, but Regina makes no apologies for her actions, prompting Mr. Gold to use whatever it takes to win her back and reawaken her memories as Belle.

At Granny's Diner, Mr Gold approaches David to ask him about his other life during the curse to see if there was some way to win back Belle, so David tells him the only way to win her heart is to be himself, so they trek down to the "Rabbit Hole" where Lacey seems to be enjoying herself with playing pool and taking shots. After much convincing, Lacey agrees to go out with Mr. Gold on a date. As they return to Granny's, Lacey shocks Mr Gold with ordering Chicken Parmesan and a full glass of wine instead of hamburgers, and as they make a small conversation he spills the wine on her dress and she excuses herself to go to the bathroom. Mr Gold then becomes suspicious when he checks on her and discovers Lacey out in the back seducing a man called Keith (the Sheriff of Nottingham's counterpart). Lacey is not happy with Mr Gold because he wants Belle back and she leaves, but when he confronts Keith again, he takes his tongue out (as he did back in the forest) so he will not scream and beats him with his cane. When Lacey returns, she sees that the rumors of Mr Gold's dark side are true and is glad for it, saying, "You really are as dark as people say," to which Mr. Gold replies, "Darker dearie, much darker," and proceeds to continue beating Keith while Lacey watches with a smile.

Meanwhile, David and Mary Margaret reveal to Emma that Anton is in Storybrooke and has been growing magic beans in a field concealed by the Mother Superior/Blue Fairy. Mary Margaret, disturbed by her own recent actions, is now as eager as David to return to the Enchanted Forest, but Emma considers Earth her home and is conflicted over which world she and Henry should live in. When Regina confronts Emma about Henry's relationship with Neal, Emma warns Regina that her behavior could result in her losing Henry "forever", which makes Regina suspicious. After David and Mary Margaret drop off the dwarves and Anton for dinner, Regina uses her magic to track them back to the field and discovers the beans. Neal brings a sleeping Henry home, complimenting his sword skills and mentioning he has befriended August. When Emma asks Neal how he feels about the idea of returning to the Enchanted Forest, he is noncommittal and she does not mention the beans. Emma still hopes to decipher August's warning.

Greg (Ethan Embry) shows Tamara (Sonequa Martin-Green) a map of where he has observed magic in Storybrooke. He still intends to find his father. Tamara explains to Greg she is going to bring a "package" into town from where she has hidden it nearby. That night at the city limits, Tamara pulls up with a trailer. Tamara opens it and reveals that she tied up Captain Hook (Colin O'Donoghue).

== Production ==
"Lacey" was co-written by series creators Edward Kitsis and Adam Horowitz, while Milan Cheylov served as the episode's director.

== Cultural references ==
Disney references in this episode point to Alice In Wonderland, Beauty and the Beast, and elements from the animated version of Robin Hood.

== Reception ==
=== Ratings ===
This outing remained steady from the previous episode, with a 2.1/6 among 18-49s with 7.37 million viewers tuning in.

=== Reviews ===
The episode received mixed reviews from critics.

Hilary Busis from Entertainment Weekly had good things to say about this outing but notes that "Rumpbelle fans were undoubtedly fine with that; others may have felt a bit let down by 'Lacey,' especially since it aired after three long Once-less weeks."

Oliver Sava of The A.V. Club gave this episode a "C+": "Welcome back to Storybrooke, where everyone is either evil or dumb right now. This show certainly does love its status quo, and after pushing characters briefly outside their comfort zones with solid results this season, 'Lacey' backtracks on a lot of those developments to create some conflict before the finale."
