= The Queen Is Dead (Once Upon a Time) =

- Once Upon a Time episode
- Episode no.: Season 2 Episode 15
- Directed by: Gwyneth Horder-Payton
- Written by: Daniel T. Thomsen; David H. Goodman
- Original air date: March 3, 2013

Guest appearances
- Barbara Hershey as Cora/The Queen of Hearts; Bailee Madison as young Snow White; Sonequa Martin-Green as Tamara; Lesley Nicol as Johanna; Michael Raymond-James as Baelfire/Neal Cassidy; Rena Sofer as Snow White's mother/Queen Eva; Keegan Connor Tracy as The Blue Fairy/Mother Superior

Episode chronology
← Previous "Manhattan"	Next → "The Miller's Daughter"
- Once Upon a Time season 2

"The Queen Is Dead" is the 15th episode of the second season of the American ABC fantasy/drama television series Once Upon a Time, and the show's 37th episode overall. It aired on March 3, 2013.

In this episode Mary Margaret has to find the dagger before Cora and Regina, while flashbacks show a young Snow trying to save her mother's life.

It was co-written by David H. Goodman and Daniel T. Thomsen, while being directed by Gwyneth Horder-Payton.

== Title card ==
The Storybrooke clock tower stands in the Enchanted Forest.

== Plot ==
=== In the Characters' Past ===
Queen Eva (Rena Sofer) makes plans for a ball to celebrate the birthday of her daughter, Snow White (Bailee Madison). When Snow sees that a servant, Johanna (Lesley Nicol), has tried on Eva's heirloom tiara, she admonishes the woman until Eva reminds Snow that royalty and the people of the kingdom are entitled to the same dignity. Eva suddenly collapses and it soon becomes clear that she is deathly ill. A royal doctor is unable to heal her, and Johanna suggests Snow make a wish to the Blue Fairy (Keegan Connor Tracy). In the woods, the Blue Fairy appears to Snow and explains that good magic cannot overcome death. However, she agrees to make an exception to the rules that bind fairies, and gives Snow a magical candle that will save her mother's life in exchange for the life of another person. She must hold the lighted candle over the heart of the person whose life she wants to take and whisper their name. Aghast, Snow reveals to her mother what has happened and explains that she is unwilling to kill someone and therefore cannot save her life. Eva tells Snow she is proud of her for her strength, and promises to be with her as long as she holds goodness in her heart. She dies.

Snow attends her mother's funeral. After Johanna escorts her from the chapel, the Blue Fairy enters but is revealed to actually be Cora (Barbara Hershey) in disguise. She declares that, having poisoned Eva, she will also destroy her legacy by turning Snow White's heart to darkness.

=== In Storybrooke ===
On her birthday, Mary Margaret (Ginnifer Goodwin) receives a package containing her mother's tiara, with a card signed by Johanna. Snow goes to see her, and they share a happy reunion. A noise in the woods then leads Mary Margaret to overhear a conversation between Regina (Lana Parrilla) and Cora, revealing that they are working together to find the Dark One's dagger. Meanwhile, David (Josh Dallas) is attacked at the police station by Captain Hook (Colin O'Donoghue), who takes back his hook. Mary Margaret finds David there and revives him, informing him of Regina's duplicity. They resolve to find the dagger first, and Mary Margaret decides to try to drive a wedge between Regina and Cora. She meets with Regina and reveals what she knows, warning her that Cora does not care about Regina or Henry (Jared S. Gilmore), but Regina dismisses her. Mary Margaret and David ask Mother Superior for help finding the dagger, but a protection spell over Gold's shop prevents her from learning anything. David then receives a call from Emma (Jennifer Morrison) that Mr. Gold (Robert Carlyle) has agreed to put his trust in them, and reveals that the dagger is hidden in the clock tower. Just after they retrieve it, Regina and Cora appear. They summon Johanna and Regina rips her heart out and demands the dagger. When Cora taunts Mary Margaret over her mother's hopes that she would always be good, Mary Margaret realizes that her private conversation with the Blue Fairy had really been with Cora and that Cora murdered her mother. Despite Johanna's protests, Mary Margaret gives up the dagger. Regina then restores Johanna's heart, but Cora immediately throws the woman to her death out of the clock tower.

Regina confronts Cora over murdering Eva and keeping it a secret from her. She realizes that Cora also orchestrated Snow's riding accident. She expresses concerns over Cora's true motivations, and the likelihood that Henry will learn that they are responsible for anything they order Mr. Gold to do now that their possession of the dagger is not a secret. Cora insists that Henry will be Regina's.

After Johanna's funeral, David reassures Mary Margaret that they will get the dagger back before Gold returns to Storybrooke. Mary Margaret questions her "good" choices that have caused death and suffering over the years, and reflects that maybe it isn't Regina or Cora who needs to change, but herself. She vows to kill Cora.

=== Outside Storybrooke ===
In New York City, Neal (Michael Raymond-James) and Henry spend time together while Emma and Mr. Gold commiserate over the trouble they are having with their respective sons. Gold asks Emma to convince Neal to come with them to Storybrooke, suggesting that Henry would otherwise run away to be with Neal as he once did with Emma, and that Emma wants a second chance with Neal. Emma broaches the topic, but before they can talk further, Hook—whom Neal recognizes—appears and attacks Gold. He stabs Gold in the chest, but Emma knocks him out before he can kill him. Gold angrily lashes out at Henry when he tries to comfort him, blaming him for the attack. The hook was poisoned and there is no antidote in this world. Neal reveals he is capable of sailing the Jolly Roger, which he surmises Hook used to get to New York, back to Storybrooke where magic can be used to save Gold's life; despite their troubles, he does not want his father to die. He also explains that his relative youth and his knowledge of Hook are due to having traveled to a different land before coming to Earth. Emma receives Mary Margaret and David's message about the dagger, and Emma urges Gold to learn to trust someone—like his own family—before he dies. He agrees and tells David and Mary Margaret where his dagger is hidden.

Neal and Emma go to pick up a car Neal has arranged to borrow to take them to the ship, and Neal reveals that the car belongs to Tamara (Sonequa Martin-Green), his fiancee.

== Production ==
"The Queen Is Dead" was co-written by co-producer Daniel T. Thomsen and co-executive producer David H. Goodman, while being directed by Sons of Anarchy vet Gwyneth Horder-Payton.

== Cultural references ==
References to Peter Pan were hinted at in this episode, when Baelfire/Neal alluded to having a youthful appearance, his knowledge of Hook's ship, and his stay in Neverland, where people do not get older as time passes.

Snow White/Mary Margaret's statement, "Help us, Mother Superior. You're our only hope!" is a nod to the famous Princess Leia line, "Help me, Obi-Wan Kenobi. You're my only hope!" from Star Wars. The lines that Mother Superior says before that is also a nod to Star Wars as is similar to what Obi-Wan Kenobi says after the destruction of Alderaan. Outside Storybrooke, Cora tells daughter Regina her horse, Rocinante, is ready. Rocinante is the name of Don Quijote's horse in the novel "El Ingenioso Hidalgo, Don Quijote de La Mancha" by Miguel de Cervantes.

== Reception ==
=== Ratings ===
The outing saw a decrease from the previous episode, tied for second in its time period with a 2.2/6 among 18-49s with only 7.39 million viewers tuning in (placing it fifth among the number of viewers tuning in).

=== Reviews ===
The episode received positive reviews from critics.

Entertainment Weekly critic Hilary Busis had praise for this episode, especially the stand-out performances from Madison and Sofer.

Oliver Sava of The A.V. Club gave it a B: "Once Upon A Time is lucky to have the Disney connection, which puts the story in a context that their target audience knows very well, and the writers take advantage of the thrill viewers get when they see their favorite cartoon characters brought into three dimensions. This season started with introducing Mulan and Sleeping Beauty, but has since slowed down with the Disney character introductions. Now it’s time to work with the characters that are already on the board, and 'The Queen Is Dead' does strong work building up character motivations and moving pieces in place as the season nears its conclusion. It’s a Snow White-centric episode with a fairyback that looks at her mother’s final days; both Bailee Madison and Ginnifer Goodwin give genuine emotional performances that make Snow seem like a real human being, largely thanks to their chemistry with new character/cannon fodder Johanna."
