= Selfless, Brave and True =

- Once Upon a Time episode
- Episode no.: Season 2 Episode 18
- Directed by: Ralph Hemecker
- Written by: Robert Hull; Kalinda Vazquez
- Original air date: March 24, 2013

Guest appearances
- Tony Amendola as Geppetto/Marco; Sonequa Martin-Green as Tamara; Eion Bailey as adult Pinocchio/August W. Booth; Ethan Embry as Owen Flynn/Greg Mendell; Michael Raymond-James as Baelfire/Neal Cassidy; Keegan Connor Tracy as the Blue Fairy/Mother Superior; Dianne Doan as Isra; Tzi Ma as The Dragon; Manny Jacinto as Quon; Jakob Davies as young Pinocchio

Episode chronology
← Previous "Welcome to Storybrooke"	Next → "Lacey"
- Once Upon a Time season 2

"Selfless, Brave and True" is the 18th episode of the second season of the American ABC fantasy/drama television series Once Upon a Time, and the show's 40th episode overall. It aired on March 24, 2013.

It was co-written by Robert Hull & Kalinda Vazquez, while being directed by Ralph Hemecker. Manny Jacinto makes his acting debut in this episode as Quon.

This episode centers on August Booth as he tries to warn Emma Swan about Tamara, while flashbacks show August's past with Tamara.

== Title card ==
A caravan trailer stands in the Enchanted Forest.

== Plot ==
=== In the Characters' Past ===
In October 2011 in Phuket, Thailand, August (Eion Bailey) is now discovering that he is turning back into wood (at 8:15, which is when the curse starts to weaken). As he wakes up, August asks his girlfriend Isra to help, and tells her he has to go to the hospital. Weeks later he arrives at an ER in Hong Kong, where August tries to convince a doctor by showing him his wooden leg, even using a knife to stab it, but the only thing the doctor sees is his human leg. As the doctor screams for the orderlies, August escapes into the seedy streets of Hong Kong, where he meets an individual, who tells him of a person who can help him, The Dragon (Tzi Ma). When they reach the Dragon's place, August waits outside, then notices a person dropping her cell phone, and when he hands it back to her, it is revealed that the person is none other than Tamara (Sonequa Martin-Green), the woman who became Neal's fiancée. August goes to see the Dragon, then shows him his wooden leg and the Dragon immediately recognizes him as Pinocchio. The Dragon tells him he can help him but there are conditions. First, the dragon needs to acquire something close to August's heart that cannot be replaced, his necklace that was made from his strings when he was a puppet. The second is $10,000 US Dollars, and if August brings it that evening he will become human again.

Later that night, August enters a bar and runs into Tamara, who offers to buy him a beer and explains that she went to see the Dragon because she was diagnosed with cancer. It turns out that she also is carrying an envelope full of money and when she excuses herself to take a phone call, August takes the money and races back to the Dragon's flat, where he gives him the money and as expected receives a potion that would stop him ever turning into wood. Just as he leaves Tamara chases after him and he falls to the ground and Tamara takes possession of the potion. Tamara later returns to the Dragon's flat, where he begins to figure out her deception that she never had cancer and that she was after the potion, which she noticed contained a substance that wasn't from "this" world. When Tamara says she cannot risk anyone else finding the Dragon and pulls out a tazer, the Dragon begins to rise from the floor, exhaling red smoke and exclaiming that she hasn't met the 'Real' Dragon. Tamara is momentarily shocked, but then thrusts the tazer into him, killing the Dragon.

Months later in New York City, and after learning that Emma Swan (Jennifer Morrison) has just arrived in Storybrooke to break the curse, August meets up with Neal/Baelfire (Michael Raymond-James) to confirm what will happen next, then tells Neal that he will follow Emma to Storybrooke and when she breaks the curse he will send Neal a postcard. As August rides off, the two are unaware that Tamara has been watching very closely from a vendor stand, where she had bought a grande size coffee cup and as expected "bumps" into Neal, putting her scheme in motion.

=== In Storybrooke ===
David (Josh Dallas) makes breakfast in bed for Mary Margaret (Ginnifer Goodwin). Emma thinks he is coddling Mary Margaret too much and cannot help her by being overly protective. Emma tells him that at the end of the day Mary Margaret needs to help herself. Mary Margaret gets up and tells David she has to go to the woods to think things over. In the woods, Mary Margaret sees a trailer and discovers August, who is now completely wooden and refuses to come out, telling Mary Margaret that he wants no one to find out that he is still in Storybrooke.

Emma learns that Neal has invited Tamara to Storybrooke and is worried that Tamara will find out the truth of who he is, but Neal says that he needs her. When Tamara shows up, Henry (Jared S. Gilmore) asks about how Tamara met Neal, then heads to school with Emma. Neal shows Tamara Henry's book and explains that he is from the Enchanted Forest. Tamara refuses to believe his claim because she believes that Emma is after him but Neal says that he and Emma are the past and Tamara wants him to prove it.

At Granny's Diner, Greg (Ethan Embry) is enjoying apple pie and learns that Regina (Lana Parrilla) had bought it for him as thanks for finding Henry. When Regina asks if they had met before, Greg claims that it's their first time meeting. Mary Margaret finds Marco (Tony Amendola) at the diner and tells him that she has found August. Someone else hears the conversation: Tamara, who finds August and tells him to leave Storybrooke forever. She gives him the keys to her vehicle to return to New York City to pick up the healing potion in her apartment.

As Emma, Mary Margaret, and Marco head to August's trailer, Marco confesses to Mary Margaret about the wardrobe and apologizes to her. Mary Margaret slaps him, then apologizes and says she would have done the same for her child. The three learn that August has just left Storybrooke. En route he finds and recognizes the photo of Tamara and her grandmother (which he had previously seen while with the Dragon), prompting him to return to town. As he makes a phone call to Emma from the Sheriff's office, Tamara cuts the phone line. Emma races back to the office; August realizes that Tamara killed the Dragon and that her real goal was to come to Storybrooke to take magic and plans to warn the residents. Tamara then pulls out her taser and uses it on August so he can't go through with it. As Emma, Mary Margaret, Henry, David, Neal, and Marco arrive to save the now almost lifeless body of August, August gives Emma his final words, then dies in Marco's arms. Henry believes that the warning August was attempting to give Emma was brave and truthful, then asks if the Blue Fairy (Keegan Connor Tracy) can save him. As August's actions were indeed brave and truthful, the Blue Fairy uses her wand and brings him back to life as a real young boy, Pinocchio (Jakob Davies). When Emma asks if Pinocchio remembers anything, he says he does not remember. Tamara tells Neal that she "believed" him, and will stay with him.

As the Charming Family returns home, Emma tells Henry that she is sorry about lying to him, and the two make up, while Mary Margaret and David have an exchange with Mary Margaret telling David about the darkened hole in her heart, and David vowing to do whatever it takes to protect their family. Regina goes to Greg's room and tells him that she knows who he was by showing him the lanyard she had kept. Greg responds by telling Regina that he will not leave Storybrooke without his father, despite Regina's claim that he left. Greg proves to Regina that he is not bluffing because hours later he gets a phone call from "Her," who is knocking on his door. That "Her" was Tamara, who is revealed to be using Neal and before they close the door, they prepare for a sexual encounter while Neal is taking a shower in the other room.

== Production ==
"Selfless, Brave and True" was co-written by Robert Hull & Kalinda Vazquez, while Ralph Hemecker served as the episode's director.

== Cultural references ==
Disney references in this episode point to Mulan in which the Dragon showcases his ability to draw smoke from his nostrils, Pinocchio in which the Blue Fairy grants August a chance to become a real boy again, The Little Mermaid in which Tamara used a shell-like mirror to see Neal and August talk, and Winnie The Pooh in which a honey neon pub sign called "Winnie's" is featured.

The flashback scenes involving August meeting a woman in Phuket then leaving for Hong Kong, his tattoo on his leg, and the Dragon seeing who August really is, are allusions to "Stranger in a Strange Land" a 2007 episode from Lost.

== Reception ==
=== Ratings ===
This episode saw a slight decline, placing a 2.2/6 among 18-49s with only 7.38 million viewers tuning in.

=== Reviews ===
The episode received mixed reviews from critics, with most commenting on Pinocchio's image and storyline.

Hilary Busis from Entertainment Weekly notes that: "There was some good stuff in 'Selfless, Brave, and True.' Unfortunately, 'wooden' Pinocchio's appearance was so distracting that it was tough to focus on what the episode did right."

Oliver Sava of The A.V. Club gave this episode a "C," noting that Hull and Vazquez "don’t craft a strong enough story to make the viewer believe that these connections are anything but overly convenient plot developments."
