= And Straight On 'til Morning =

- Once Upon a Time episode
- Episode no.: Season 2 Episode 22
- Directed by: Dean White
- Written by: Edward Kitsis; Adam Horowitz
- Original air date: May 12, 2013

Guest appearances
- Lee Arenberg as Leroy; Sarah Bolger as Princess Aurora; Beverley Elliott as Granny; Ethan Embry as Greg Mendell; Christopher Gauthier as Smee; Sonequa Martin-Green as Tamara; Michael Raymond-James as Neal Cassidy; Parker Croft as Felix; Julian Morris as Prince Philip; Raphael Sbarge as Archie Hopper; Dylan Schmid as Baelfire; Jamie Chung as Mulan

Episode chronology
← Previous "Second Star to the Right"	Next → "The Heart of the Truest Believer"
- Once Upon a Time season 2

"And Straight on 'til Morning" is the 22nd episode of the second season of the American ABC fantasy/drama television series Once Upon a Time, and the show's 44th episode overall. It aired on May 12, 2013 and serves as the second-season finale of the series.

The episode was written by Edward Kitsis & Adam Horowitz and directed by Dean White. The episode was watched by 7.33 million American viewers, and was given mixed reviews from professional critics.

In this episode, Emma Swan, her parents, Regina, Henry, and Hook try to stop Greg and Tamara, while flashbacks show Hook's past with Baelfire.

== Title card ==
The island of Neverland's skyline stands beyond the Enchanted Forest.

== Plot ==
=== In the Characters' Past ===
In the hours after they pulled Baelfire out of the water and onto the Jolly Roger, Hook (Colin O'Donoghue) tells Mr. Smee that he still wants to avenge Milah's death by going after Rumplestilskin, becomes intrigued by their latest catch, not knowing that Bae is Milah and Rumplstiltskin's son. While Baelfire is not happy being rescued by a pirate, Hook, who now has found out who his father is, thinks he may have found the opportunity. While they ponder whether or not to send him back to Neverland, Hook tells Smee that Bae would make an excellent pirate for his crew. But it appears that the Lost Boys have shown up at the Jolly Roger, eager to get their hands on Baelfire, warning Hook the Shadow will tear his ship apart if they do not hand over Baelfire. But they come up empty-handed thanks to Bae holding his breath in a secret compartment.

As the two bond, it appears that they formed a good relationship, with Hook showing Bae how to navigate the ship, even carving markings to show him the directions. Hook asks Bae about his family, who told him that his mother was killed by a pirate, and that his father changed after he became the Dark One, while Hook reveals that he also lost his father, who abandoned him so he wouldn't be captured by the authorities. Later on, after Bae recognizes Milah's picture after looking at his desk, he turns on Hook, who now knows that he is Rumplestiltskin's son. Hook then explains to Bae that Rumplestiltskin was the one that killed Milah and that she regretted leaving Bae. Despite knowing the truth, Bae is still angry with Hook for splitting up his family. Bae tells Hook that he wants to go back to the Darling family, but Hook says that they cannot go back, then responds with, "This ship can be your home, your family ... it's not too late to start over. I can change, Bae, for you." Unfortunately, Bae turns him down, believing that Hook is only thinking of himself. But moments later, the Lost Boys show up to grab Bae, because Hook has made a deal with them. As they take off with Bae, Hook feels that he disappointed himself by giving up Bae, so he crosses out the marking he made to teach Bae.

Later, the Lost Ones compare Bae to a drawing and, since he is not a match, declare that he will live but will be held captive. The drawing shows that Henry Mills is the individual sought by the shadow; they got him, but before conception and birth. The leader says that he will show up, as "Peter Pan never fails."

=== In Storybrooke ===
At the park, Mr. Gold (Robert Carlyle) walks up to see Henry (Jared S. Gilmore) playing on a swing, with Granny (Beverley Elliott) and her crossbow keeping watch. Gold, still believing Henry will be his undoing, uses magic to fray the rope of the swing so that Henry will hit the rocks. Before this can happen, Emma Swan (Jennifer Morrison), David (Josh Dallas), and Mary Margaret (Ginnifer Goodwin) arrive to tell him and Henry the news that Tamara shot Neal and he fell into the portal. Gold blames himself for losing his son again and, when they tell him about the danger, refuses to help them save Storybrooke. Meanwhile, in the mines, Tamara (Sonequa Martin-Green), Greg (Ethan Embry), and Hook set the diamond on a rock. Then Greg uses Happy's pickaxe to trigger the device that will destroy the town and revert it to a forest. However, Hook, seeing that they have something else planned, decides not to be involved with their destruction of "his kind." Back at Mary Margaret's apartment, Regina (Lana Parrilla) wakes up and is greeted warmly by Henry, who is excited to see her again. As an exploding sound is heard, Regina tells them that the device has been activated and she can only slow it down. Hook then shows up to offer assistance, and after he gets an earful from everyone, including a punch in the face from David, all parties agree that they should set aside their differences. Regina tells Henry that she is to blame for what is happening, also saying to him that she will love him no matter what, then tells him "Good Bye" before they all leave.

As Greg and Tamara try to destroy all evidence so they can escape, David and Hook arrive to stop them. When Greg sees them, he is slowed down by Hook and drops the beans while Tamara takes aim at David. But as soon as David catches up with Tamara, Greg attacks him, and the couple escapes with the magic beans. Hook stops David just in time to show them that he has one of the beans that they can use. Meanwhile, at the pawn shop, Gold discovers that the dwarves have taken one of the steins which they are using to restore Sneezy's memory before the destruction takes place. It turns out that the Blue Fairy has found a way to bring everyone's true memories back thanks to her restoring August back to Pinocchio. Leroy then gives Gold an elixir that he can use to bring back Belle (Emilie de Ravin). Later on, a depressed Gold looks on as Lacey continues to drink, prompting him to take out the broken cup from the cabinet and restore it to normal. He then pours the elixir into the cup and gives it to Lacey to drink, and she regains her memory as Belle. The two then hug each other.

As Regina and Emma head down to the mine, they see the diamond. Regina tells her that she can only slow down the destruction, not stop it. Containing the power of the trigger will take all of Regina's energy, killing her. But Emma discovers that Regina is willing to die because everyone sees her as the Evil Queen and she does not want Henry to think she is evil. As Regina then takes control of the device, Emma returns to Granny's to tell Mary Margaret, Hook, and David about what Regina is planning to do. Henry's insistence that they help Regina prompts Mary Margaret to remember how they had sent the wraith into the portal. Therefore, they can use the bean to send the device away from Storybrooke. Hook agrees to hand over the bean to Emma, but only after learning that Neal is Henry's father. As Emma, Mary Margaret, Henry, and David arrive to see a weakening Regina, Emma attempts to take out the bean, but the pouch is empty. Realizing that Hook tricked her as he has taken the bean in an attempt to escape Storybrooke, Emma looks at her family and then hugs them while Henry looks at Regina and calls her a hero and hugs her. This is also the moment Emma refers to Mary Margaret and David as "Mom" and "Dad" for the first time. Emma realizes she can help Regina by using her own magic, and as they work together the device is deactivated, resulting in Storybrooke returning to normal. But as they all celebrate saving the town from being destroyed, Emma notices Henry's backpack on the floor. He was kidnapped by Greg and Tamara, who used the device to distract the town so they could take Henry, whom they see as more valuable than magic. As Emma, Regina, Mary Margaret, and David catch up to stop them, Tamara takes out a bean and opens up a portal in the water to make their escape. The foursome are too late, but all of a sudden Hook and his ship return. He tells them that he has had a change of heart and wants to help them find Henry and gives Emma the bean. They are then joined by Gold and Belle, who also want to join in the search. But Gold tells Belle that she must stay in Storybrooke now that they know that there are others out there that want to destroy their world. So, he gives her a spell that will cloak the town. The two kiss before he climbs aboard, after he admits he does not expect to return. Now that everyone has agreed to a truce, especially Gold and Hook, Gold conjures up his magic globe and pricks his finger, using the blood to locate Henry. After Hook throws the bean into the ocean, the ship enters the swirling portal to Neverland.

=== In the Enchanted Forest ===
Mulan (Jamie Chung), Aurora (Sarah Bolger), and a restored Prince Phillip (Julian Morris) discover an unconscious Neal (Michael Raymond-James) on a beach, gravely injured but alive.

== Production ==
"And Straight on 'til Morning" was co-written by series creators Edward Kitsis & Adam Horowitz, while Dean White served as the episode's director.

== Cultural references ==
The plot of this episode has parallels to Peter Pan in its focus on Hook, Neverland setting, introduction of the Lost Boys and mention of Peter Pan. Beauty & The Beast is referenced when Belle's dark side is restored to her normal self by drinking from the chipped cup.

== Reception ==
=== Ratings ===
The outing held steady from the previous episode, placing a 2.2/7 among 18-49s with 7.33 million viewers tuning in, down from the 9.66 million it had from the first-season finale.

=== Reviews ===
The finale received positive reviews from critics.

Hilary Busis from Entertainment Weekly gave the episode a positive, yet somewhat mild review: "So, was Once’s second season finale as momentous as its first? The short answer: Not really. The long answer: Last year’s juiciest finale developments -- Emma breaking the Dark Curse and Rumpelstiltskin bringing magic back to Storybrooke -- changed the show’s status quo for good, setting up a world of new and exciting possibilities. By contrast, Henry’s kidnapping and his dysfunctional family’s subsequent journey to Neverland aren’t really game-changers. In the short term, at least, they’re simply setting up a season 3 that's much like season 2: a sprawling exercise in world-jumping and cross-cutting that trades one big goal (break the curse!) for several smaller, slightly less pressing goals (find Henry! Protect Storybrooke from outsiders! Figure out what Red’s been up to for the past six months!)."

Amy Ratcliffe of IGN gave the finale a 9 out of 10.

EW ranked Lacey number two for "Most Welcome Exit for an Unloved Character," Emma's saving Regina at number two for "Single Weakest Twist," and number three for "Next Year's Season Pass is Now in Jeopardy" for the 2013 TV Season Finale Awards.
