= Second Star to the Right =

- Once Upon a Time episode
- Episode no.: Season 2 Episode 21
- Directed by: Ralph Hemecker
- Written by: Andrew Chambliss; Ian Goldberg
- Original air date: May 5, 2013

Guest appearances
- Sonequa Martin-Green as Tamara; Ethan Embry as Owen Flynn/Greg Mendell; Michael Raymond-James as Baelfire/Neal Cassidy; David Anders as Dr. Whale/Victor Frankenstein; Keegan Connor Tracy as Mother Superior/Blue Fairy; Dylan Schmid as Young Baelfire; Freya Tingley as Wendy Darling; Christopher Gauthier as Smee; Andrew Airlie as George Darling; Karin Inghammer as Mary Darling; William Ainscough as John Darling; Benjamin Cook as Michael Darling

Episode chronology
| ← Previous "The Evil Queen" | Next → "And Straight On 'til Morning" |
- Once Upon a Time season 2

"Second Star to the Right" is the 21st episode of the second season of the American ABC fantasy/drama television series Once Upon a Time, and the show's 43rd episode overall. It aired on May 5, 2013.

The episode was written by Andrew Chambliss & Ian Goldberg and directed by Ralph Hemecker.

In this episode, Emma Swan, her parents, and Neal try to find a missing Regina, while flashbacks show Baelfire's past with the Darling family.

== Title card ==
London's skyline with the clock turning a quarter past 8 on the Elizabeth Tower of the Palace of Westminster stands beyond the Enchanted Forest.

== Plot ==
=== Event chronology ===
- The first Land Without Magic events takes place thousands of years after "Flower Child" and the second takes place six months after Baelfire's arrival in the new land.
- The Storybrooke events takes place after "The Evil Queen".

=== In the Characters' Past ===
After falling through the portal in the Enchanted Forest, Baelfire lands in London, England during the nineteenth century. After six months living on the streets, he steals bread from a house and is caught by young resident Wendy Darling. She takes pity on him and hides him in the home for a period of weeks. Wendy's parents catch them while Wendy is bringing food to Bae, but Mrs. Darling invites him to stay with the family after he reveals he is an orphan.

One night, Wendy tells Bae that a magical shadow has appeared nightly since Bae came to the house, inviting her to a fantastical place called Neverland, where children are free from the restrictions of parents. Bae warns Wendy and her brothers against magic, revealing that he came from a magical land where magic destroyed his family. Wendy ignores Bae's warning and leaves with the shadow that night. In the morning Wendy returns and tells them that although Neverland is wondrous, the children cry for their parents at night and the shadow prevents them from leaving. She has only been brought back because the shadow wants a boy instead and will return that night for one of her brothers. They attempt to defend themselves, but the shadow proves too powerful and is about to capture Wendy's youngest brother, Michael, when Bae offers himself in Michael's place. Confident that saving the Darling family from magic is the right thing to do, he thanks Wendy for her kindness and is carried away. As they approach Neverland, Bae distracts the shadow with a match, forcing it to drop him in the water. He is then pulled aboard the Jolly Roger by Hook (Colin O'Donoghue).

=== In Storybrooke ===
It is 6AM, and after waking up from a dream about Wendy, Neal (Michael Raymond-James) notices Tamara (Sonequa Martin-Green) getting ready to jog as part of a training practice for a marathon, but before he can go back to sleep Neal sees his father about to make Dr. Whale kiss his foot, leading Neal to be convinced that he has not changed and asks him to stay away from both him and Henry. About eight minutes later, Emma Swan (Jennifer Morrison), David (Josh Dallas), Mary Margaret (Ginnifer Goodwin) and Henry show up at the Mayor's office, where they see the bean tree with the magic beans missing and Emma noticing a system override, leading her to suspect Tamara, which Mary Margaret dismisses as Emma being jealous of her, but Emma is ready to prove that theory wrong by going to Neal himself, so she visits Neal to ask about Tamara's whereabouts. Neal tells Emma that she went for a jog in the woods but Emma notices sand on the closet floor, leading Neal to check out if Tamara changed her routine at the last minute. While they check the beachfront the two waste no time at all changing the conversation to what happened ten years earlier with Emma blaming Neal for leaving her to face jailtime, but Neal tells her that he blamed himself and after what August told him he couldn't bring himself to find Emma. The two are then interrupted by Tamara, who admitted to having changed her jogging route, thus convincing Emma and Neal. Unfortunately, Tamara found a way to throw Emma and Neal off her tracks because she, along with Greg (Ethan Embry) and Hook, are keeping Regina (Lana Parrilla) hostage at a seafood cannery, where Regina tries to tempt Hook with an offer, to no avail, since he still wants to kill Rumplestilskin, allowing the outsiders to do their dirty work on Regina. It also turns out that Greg and Tamara are also working for the "Home Office," and they tell Regina that this group's main goal is to destroy magic because it is evil and unholy, and now that they have the magic beans and the black diamond, they can put their plan into motion. This gives Greg the opportunity to use shock therapy on Regina to get the truth out of her about his father's whereabouts. Despite Regina telling him that she doesn't know where he is, it isn't the answer Greg wants to hear, and with every answer he turns up the electricity to the point of Regina screaming out in pain.

Meanwhile, David and Mary Margaret turn to the last person that could help them, Mr. Gold. When the two tell Gold that they need something that will help find Regina, Gold tells Lacey to step into another room and then opens his cabinet to take out a bottle consisting of Regina's tear, which, when mixed with another teardrop allows the person to see and feel everything the other experiences. After David and Mary Margaret leave, Gold discovers that Lacey heard everything and seems to be comfortable with his secret. Mary Margaret volunteers to find Regina after helping to kill Cora. As David places the tear in Mary Margaret's eye, she begins to feel Regina's pain and smell the scent of sardines, leading Emma and Neal to the Storybrooke cannery. As the four converge on the plant, Tamara notices that they have been found out and warns Greg to end the treatment on Regina and meet her at a nearby location, but Greg refuses to give up and after he increases the electricity, Regina tells Greg that she killed his father and had his body buried in the woods. He then escapes as David tries to shoot him, but Mary Margaret tells David that they should help Regina instead. As David tells Emma over the phone that Greg was behind Regina's kidnapping, Neal and Emma believe that they were wrong about Tamara, only to have Tamara attack Emma from behind. As Neal learns the truth about Tamara's intentions to destroy magic and her using him all along, she shoots Neal. Emma then attacks Tamara, who flees after using a magic bean to create a portal to vanish Neal and Emma. Emma holds onto a pipe as a portal grows in the ground; Neal however slips into the hole after letting go of Emma's grip, saying his final words, "I love you, too."

As the Charming family returns home, Emma is given comfort by David over losing Neal, while Regina, whose powers are restored by the Blue Fairy, learns that Mary Margaret saved her. However, before she can explain her resentment toward the family, she tells them that the outsiders have a diamond that she had intended to use to destroy Storybrooke. She goes on to explain that now the pair have the device, she has no control over the trigger. Tamara then tells Greg at the burial site of his father that the Home Office has given them orders to use the diamond to destroy the town immediately.

== Production ==
"Second Star to the Right" was co-written by Andrew Chambliss & Ian Goldberg, while Ralph Hemecker served as the episode's director.

== Cultural references ==
Disney references in this episode refer to Peter Pan, in which the characters are dressed in similar attire to the 1953 film. The title refers to the directions Peter gives to Neverland when Wendy asks his address, which in the film are "Second star to the right and straight on till morning." Bae's arrival at Kensington Gardens and his welcome into the Darling family are a reference to Peter Pan in Kensington Gardens.

The clock on London's Big Ben in this episode is set at 8:15, marking another Lost recurring theme that has run throughout the series since the pilot.

During the commercial break, series star Lana Parrilla spoofed her character Regina Mills/the Evil Queen in a promotion for the Magic Kingdom Park in which she vowed to "take over" the area of New Fantasyland.

== Reception ==
=== Ratings ===
The episode saw an improvement in the series' ratings, placing a 2.2/6 among 18-49s with 7.50 million viewers tuning in.

=== Reviews ===
The episode received mostly good reviews from critics.

Hilary Busis from Entertainment Weekly gave the episode a positive review, noting how the producers put a new twist on the Peter Pan tale, "I dig how Kitsis and Horowitz are twisting this particular story, and I'm looking forward to seeing how it continues to play out in the finale (and season 3) – especially since we haven't even met Peter himself yet."

Amy Ratcliffe of IGN gave the episode a 7.2 out of 10.
