= The Evil Queen (Once Upon a Time) =

- Once Upon a Time episode
- Episode no.: Season 2 Episode 20
- Directed by: Gwyneth Horder-Payton
- Written by: Christine Boylan; Jane Espenson
- Original air date: April 28, 2013

Guest appearances
- Sonequa Martin-Green as Tamara; Ethan Embry as Owen Flynn/Greg Mendell; Michael Raymond-James as Baelfire/Neal Cassidy; Lee Arenberg as Grumpy/Leroy

Episode chronology
← Previous "Lacey"	Next → "Second Star to the Right"
- Once Upon a Time season 2

"The Evil Queen" is the 20th episode of the second season of the American ABC fantasy/drama television series Once Upon a Time, and the show's 42nd episode overall. It aired on April 28, 2013.

In this episode, Hook helps Regina find a way to get her and Henry to the Enchanted Forest; and Emma and Henry investigate Tamara. In flashbacks, the Evil Queen goes undercover to kill Snow White.

The episode was written by Christine Boylan & Jane Espenson and directed by Gwyneth Horder-Payton.

== Title card ==
The castle of the Evil Queen stands beyond the Enchanted Forest.

== Plot ==
=== Event Chronology ===
The Enchanted Forest events take place after "Child of the Moon" and before "Ariel". The Storybrooke events take place after "Lacey".

=== In the Characters' Past ===
In the Enchanted Forest, Queen Regina (Lana Parrilla) searches for the fugitive Snow White (Ginnifer Goodwin) and finds that Snow has recently left a village. Regina offers the villagers gold for information on Snow, whom she denounces as the murderer of Leopold, but they remain silent. Regina orders all the villagers killed. She meets with Rumplestiltstkin, asking to learn Cora's shape-shifting spell. He tells her it would take too long to teach it, instead offering to cast it on her himself, in exchange for her cutting off trade with King George's kingdom in order to bankrupt him. She agrees and is transformed into an inconspicuous peasant. She will be unable to use her own magic while under the spell, but she plans to get close enough to Snow White to murder her with her own hands, and then cast herself as a hero instead of the "Evil Queen" her subjects call her.

In a marketplace, Regina is unable to contain her anger at seeing the public defacement of an effigy of herself; blamed for the crime and mocked as a madwoman when she proclaims herself the queen, guards take her to be beheaded. Snow White appears and rescues her from the chopping block, taking her to a forest hideout to nurse her injuries. Regina asks why Snow, a known fugitive, would risk her own life to help her, a stranger. Snow explains that a stranger saved her life when she was a little girl on a runaway horse, and that two people can form a true connection through kindness. At Regina's prompting, Snow also speaks of Regina as they move within the forest, saying that if Regina were truly repentant and wanted to be a family, Snow could forgive her for sending the Huntsman after her. But when they come to the massacred village, Snow declares that there is no good in Regina and her crimes are unforgivable. Regina reminds Snow that Regina saved her from the horse, a connection Snow never revealed, leading Snow to recognize Regina. Snow nocks an arrow but does not shoot as Regina flees. Regina comes to the palace of Rumplestiltskin, who has repeatedly ignored her verbal summons. He forces her to acknowledge that neither Snow nor the people will ever accept her, then restores her appearance. She embraces her identity as the "Evil Queen."

=== In Storybrooke ===
At the library clock tower, Greg (Ethan Embry) and Tamara (Sonequa Martin-Green) remove Hook's (Colin O'Donoghue) hood, begin their plot to take magic from Storybrooke, and look for Greg's father. The outsiders offer Hook a chance to help them, but Hook says that he already succeeded in his mission in killing Rumplestiltskin. But the two show Hook that his mission failed by giving him his telescope to show him that Mr. Gold and Lacey are still alive. Hook reluctantly gives in to their demands. At the same time, at the docks, David (Josh Dallas) and Mary Margaret discuss what to do about Regina, knowing that every time they tried to trust her she kept breaking those promises, unaware that Regina, posing as a fisherman, is hearing the conversation and vows that she will not be locked away. The following morning, Regina approaches Henry at the park and tries to manipulate him into believing that his family is about to take him away from her by showing off the magic beans that would transport them back to the Enchanted Forest. However, when Regina tells Henry that she plans to solve the problem by unleashing a fail-safe trigger that would wipe out Storybrooke, Henry tells Regina that she has not changed. Before he can warn the family, Regina takes out her book of spells and gives him a short-term memory block to make him forget about the conversation and they start over as if nothing happened.

Meanwhile, at Granny's Diner, Emma Swan bumps into Tamara moments after she picks up sandwiches for her and Neal/Baelfire (Michael Raymond-James). As Emma helps her, she notices Tamara has a list of Storybrooke residents and their true identities. Tamara is quick to pick it up but assures Emma that she won't reveal the truth about Storybrooke. Emma deduces that Tamara is the "she" that August warned her about, but when she runs this by Mary Margaret, her mother dismisses it as Emma's jealousy towards Tamara because Emma might have feelings for Neal. Mary Margaret warns Emma if Henry finds out, he will want to reunite his parents, so she tells Emma not to worry about it until she has proof. However, Henry heard everything and now wants to tag along with Emma and restart Operation Cobra. At the Inn, the two stake out the place until Neal and Tamara leave so Emma can snoop with Henry as a lookout. Inside, she checks the room until she notices a creaking sound on the floor, only to have Neal return to discover Emma trying to pry the floor open. Emma insists Tamara is not to be trusted, but the floorboard reveals nothing. She tells Neal that Tamara has a list of Storybrooke residents; however, Neal tells Emma that he gave Tamara the list so she can tell who's who in town. Emma and Henry believe that Tamara might be planning something, but Henry thinks that Neal and Emma should get back together and brings up the subject of the magic beans to Emma. When Mary Margaret, David, and Leroy arrive at the bean field, they discover the crop was burned, leading to speculation that someone found out at the last moment.

At the Mayor's office, Hook shows up to warn Regina about Greg and Tamara, and that he was offered a deal to help them take magic from Storybrooke, but tells Regina that he can help her by betraying the outsiders, reminding her how loyal he was to Cora, who he learns has died. Regina agrees to this alliance and explains that the curse has a fail-safe trigger that will wipe Storybrooke off the map and retrieving the device would be the only way to take Henry with her now that she has found out about the magic beans. As the two venture down the library's elevator for what Regina reveals to Hook was a two-man operation, Regina notices Hook wearing Cora's arm brace and demands that he give it to her, and he does. When they reach the bottom, Regina tells Hook that this task requires a distraction, so she pushes Hook down into the lair to face a wraith-like Maleficent while Regina heads to Snow White's coffin to pick up a black diamond. As Regina returns to the top of the library, she is shocked to see Hook is there as she hands over the diamond. Regina has been betrayed by Hook, since he had been allied with Greg and Tamara all along. Regina also discovers that she cannot use her powers, as the leather cuff Hook gave her and placed on her left wrist renders her powers useless. As Tamara takes out her list of Storybrooke residents and identities, Greg tells her that Regina is the "Evil Queen" before they bag her.

== Production ==
"The Evil Queen" was co-written by Christine Boylan & Jane Espenson, while Gwyneth Horder-Payton served as the episode's director.

== Cultural references ==
Disney references in this episode point to Sleeping Beauty and Snow White. As Queen Regina, dressed in peasant garb, walks among her subjects, she discovers how unpopular a queen she is. This plot is similar to Mark Twain's The Prince and the Pauper where Prince Edward changes places and social status with peasant Tom Canty.

When changing Regina back into the Queen, Rumpelstiltskin says, "So sad, so true," a reference to the song "Poor Unfortunate Souls" sung by Ursula in The Little Mermaid. The song also lends itself to a later Once Upon a Time episode, "Poor Unfortunate Soul".

== Reception ==
=== Ratings ===
The outing saw a slight decrease in the ratings, placing 2.0/6 among 18-49s with 7.16 million viewers tuning in, making it the lowest rated episode of the series to date with adults 18-49.

=== Reviews ===
The episode received mixed reviews from critics.

Hilary Busis from Entertainment Weekly gave it positive remarks: "How do you solve a problem like Regina? Don't get me wrong: Lana Parrilla certainly brings her A-game to Once week after week, and layered anti-heroes are certainly more interesting than one-dimensional, purely eeeevil villains. Plus, anyone who presumably has an entire closet filled with tiny hats will always be capable (and worthy) of our attention. But even though Once's writers have tried to cast Regina in a more sympathetic light this season, it has been and continues to be mighty difficult to empathize with a character who takes several leaps backwards every time she takes a single, halting step toward redemption -- no matter how much of a witch her mother was."

Oliver Sava of The A.V. Club gave a very negative review, giving the episode a D+ and stating: "It’s been a while since Once Upon A Time had an episode quite as bad as this one, which combines a gross abuse of magic with far-fetched plot developments and incredibly repetitive storytelling. Dear god, how many variations of Regina hunting down Snow White are we going to see on this show?"
