= Hat Trick (Once Upon a Time) =

- Once Upon a Time episode
- Episode no.: Season 1 Episode 17
- Directed by: Ralph Hemecker
- Written by: Vladimir Cvetko & David H. Goodman
- Original air date: March 25, 2012

Guest appearances
- Giancarlo Esposito as The Magic Mirror; Tony Perez as the Valet; Sebastian Stan as The Mad Hatter/Jefferson; Paul McGillion as The Knave of Hearts; Roger Daltrey as the voice of the Caterpillar (uncredited); Jennifer Koenig as The Queen of Hearts

Episode chronology
← Previous "Heart of Darkness"	Next → "The Stable Boy"
- Once Upon a Time season 1

"Hat Trick" is the 17th episode of the American fairy tale/drama television series Once Upon a Time, which aired in the United States on ABC on March 25, 2012.

The series takes place in the fictional seaside town of Storybrooke, Maine, in which the residents are actually characters from various fairy tales that were transported to the "real world" town by a powerful curse. This episode centers on Jefferson (Sebastian Stan) and his fairytale counterpart, the Mad Hatter.

It was co-written by David H. Goodman and Vladimir Cvetko, while Ralph Hemecker directed the episode.

== Title card ==
Massive mushrooms grow in the Enchanted Forest.

== Plot ==
=== In the characters' past ===
In the Enchanted Forest, Jefferson (Sebastian Stan) is frantically running through the woods and ducks behind a tree. However, he is found a moment later by his daughter, Grace (Alissa Skovbye); they are playing hide-and-seek. They happily go off to find mushrooms to sell at the market. But when they return home, they see that the carriage of the Evil Queen (Lana Parrilla) is waiting outside. Jefferson tells the frightened Grace to hide in the woods until the Queen is gone. He enters the house to find the Queen. She wants one last favor from Jefferson, offering Grace luxury for the rest of her life as a reward after Jefferson's accomplishing a deed. He refuses, stating that his job cost Grace her mother and he will not allow her to lose her father as well. He finally tells the Queen that there is nothing more important than family. The Queen agrees, and leaves.

At the market the next day, Grace sets her heart on a stuffed white rabbit as it will be perfect for her tea parties. Jefferson is unable to afford the price of one silver, but tries to convince the elderly merchant to accept his eight coppers. The merchant refuses. Grace assures Jefferson that she does not need it and they leave. The merchant goes to the back of her cart, where the Magic Mirror (Giancarlo Esposito) states that she is truly cruel. The merchant is revealed to be the Evil Queen. Back at home, Jefferson has sewn a rabbit for Grace. She is delighted and adds it to her tea party guests. Jefferson is clearly troubled. He asks Grace to spend the rest of the day with the neighbors as he has work to do. She wants to go with him as she likes to work with him in the forest, but he tells her he is not going to the forest. She realizes that his work is related to the Queen's visit and she begs him to change his mind. He says that he wants her to have everything she needs. She replies that she only needs him and asks him to stay. He refuses, but promises to be home in time for the next tea party. After Grace is gone, Jefferson takes a large hat box out of his trunk.

Jefferson brings his box to the Queen and has her promise that his daughter will want for nothing after he retrieves what she has lost. After she agrees, he takes a top hat out of the hat box and sets it on the floor. He spins it and the hat continues spinning until it grows into an enormous spinning portal. The Queen and Jefferson jump into it and land in a room full of different doors. He leads the Queen to a mirror. Before they step through, he explains that the hat has a rule: the number of people who go into a door must be the same number as those who come out. The two of them go through the mirror. They step into a land with very tall grass and giant mushrooms. They pass an enormous blue caterpillar smoking a hookah. It asks who they are and blows smoke rings into their faces. Jefferson coughs and mutters that he hates Wonderland. The pair come upon the Queen of Hearts's hedge maze where the Evil Queen wishes to go to the building in the center. Jefferson refuses out of fear of the Queen of Hearts, but the Evil Queen reminds him that he cannot leave without her. He cautions that the hedges eat whatever comes too close, but she burns a straight path to the building with magic. The Evil Queen takes a small box from the building, causing guards to appear. They are able to narrowly escape.

She and Jefferson hurry back to the mirror, but the Evil Queen stops to take a piece of the mushroom. She places the piece into the box, and her father Henry (Tony Perez) appears out of the box. Jefferson is horrified. He realizes that the Queen knew about the hat's rule and did not tell him that her father was abducted by the Queen of Hearts for leverage on purpose. Because there are now three people, one of them cannot leave Wonderland. The Evil Queen freezes Jefferson's feet to the path, and he begs her to let him go back to his daughter. She tells him that if he cared for Grace, he would have never left her. The Evil Queen and Henry walk through the mirror and leave Jefferson behind staring at the mirror in a daze as guards drag him away.

Jefferson is presented to the Queen of Hearts (Jennifer Koenig). She knows that he helped the Evil Queen and has her aide the Knave of Hearts (Paul McGillion) ask how they got into Wonderland. He says that he will tell her only after he is allowed to go home to his daughter. The Queen of Hearts orders him beheaded, and he is decapitated, though to his horrified surprise he remains alive. He is told that if he wants his head reattached, he must answer the question. He tells the Queen of Hearts about his hat. When asked about the hat's whereabouts, he says that the Evil Queen took it. The Queen of Hearts tells him that if he only requires the magical hat to return home, he only has to make another. However, he replies that he cannot: a hat without magic is just a hat and will not work. The Queen of Hearts tells him that his task is to get a hat to work.

Afterwards, he is seen in a large room filled with millions of failed hats, making yet another hat and frantically muttering to himself to get it to work; it is apparent he has gone mad (hence the name) over the separation from his daughter.

=== In Storybrooke ===
Mr. Gold (Robert Carlyle) and Sheriff Emma Swan (Jennifer Morrison) return to the sheriff's office to see Henry Mills (Jared S. Gilmore) sitting there. He quietly congratulates Emma on helping Mary Margaret Blanchard (Ginnifer Goodwin) escape, but Emma does not know what he is talking about. Mr. Gold tells Emma that Mary Margaret is no longer in her jail cell. Emma states that if it is discovered that Mary Margaret escaped, proving her innocence would be impossible and sets out to find her. Mr. Gold reminds Emma that her future is in jeopardy if she is found helping Mary Margaret. She tells him that she would rather lose her job than her friend. As Emma is driving through the woods, she nearly hits a man (Stan). She apologizes and when she notices he is limping, she offers to drive him home. He takes up her offer and introduces himself as Jefferson. At his mansion, he gives her a map to aid her in her search and brings her tea. However, the tea makes her dizzy, and he drags her to the couch so she could rest. She notices that he is no longer limping. He admits that she caught him, revealing he poisoned the tea, and she loses consciousness.

Emma wakes up bound and gagged on the couch. She crushes her teacup and uses the pieces to free herself. While sneaking around the mansion, she sees Jefferson sharpening scissors, then accidentally steps on a loose floorboard. She hides in the nearest room and finds Mary Margaret also bound and gagged. She frees Mary Margaret, who tells her that she was running through the woods and was captured by Jefferson. She explains that she found a key in her cell and used it to escape. The pair try to leave the mansion, but they are caught by Jefferson who is armed with Emma's gun. He orders Emma to tie Mary Margaret back up and gag her and tells her that he has a task for her. In the next room, he seats her at a table with a hat and some tools and tells her to make him a hat. He reveals that he remembers life in the Enchanted Forest and that he is aware of the curse. He tells her that he lived trapped in the mansion for twenty-eight years, stuck doing the same things every day. He knows that Emma refuses to believe in the curse or acknowledge the facts about Storybrooke. He orders her to make him a magical hat, and only she can do it as she brought magic to Storybrooke. He tells her he is The Mad Hatter, but he tells her that he is named Jefferson. She calls him insane for believing she has magic and for believing in magic at all. He replies that everyone wants a magical solution to their problem and everyone refuses to believe in magic. When she tries to tell him that the real world does not have magic, he scoffs and tells her that there are many worlds and some have magic, some do not, and some need it. He refuses to let her and Mary Margaret go free until Emma makes a working, magical hat. When she asks what will happen if the hat works, he answers that he will go home.

Later, Emma becomes frustrated and demands to know why she is doing this. Jefferson shows her a telescope pointed at the house of a little girl. He tells her that the little girl is his daughter Grace, who is named Paige in Storybrooke. He explains that he is cursed to remember life in the Enchanted Forest and know that he does not belong in this world. He is tortured to watch Grace live a happy life with a new father. Emma asks why he does not simply reach out to her, but he says that he is not cruel enough to destroy Grace's reality and inflict on her the same awareness he has. He explains that it is hard enough to live in a land where you do not belong, but knowing it, holding conflicting realities in your head will drive anybody mad. He wants to take her home to the world where he and Grace once lived so that they can be together and she can remember who he is. Emma tells him that she knows what it is like to be separated from a child and tells him that it feels like going crazy. He tells her that he is not crazy. Emma says that if he is right, Mary Margaret is her mother and states that she would like to believe that more than anything in the world. She agrees to try and believe in magic and make his hat work. However, when his back is turned, she hits him with the telescope and frees Mary Margaret. Jefferson catches up to Emma and attacks her. While they are fighting, Emma notices a scar around his neck. Mary Margaret hits him with a croquet mallet and kicks him out the window. When Mary Margaret and Emma look down, only the hat Emma made remains. Emma finds her car and her keys outside. Mary Margaret expects to be taken back to prison, but Emma allows her to decide. When Mary Margaret does not understand, Emma explains that Mary Margaret is the only family Emma has and says that it would be better to face the trial together rather than alone. Mary Margaret willingly goes back to her cell.

Hours later, Mayor Regina Mills (Parrilla) finds that Emma's car is not parked outside the sheriff's office. However, she discovers that Mary Margaret is in her cell. Mr. Gold tells Regina that his client is not seeing any visitors. As they walk out together, Regina angrily asks him why Mary Margaret has returned. He replies that Emma must be more resourceful than they had hoped she would be. Regina tells him that she only planted the key upon his suggestion and that she made a deal with him because she wanted results for herself. He assures Regina that she will get those results. Meanwhile, Emma visits Henry at his school before classes start. Paige walks by and greets Henry, prompting Emma to ask to see Henry's storybook. She finds pictures of Jefferson and his daughter Grace inside.

== Production ==
"Hat Trick" was co-written by Vladimir Cvetko and co-executive producer David H. Goodman, while Silk Stalkings veteran, Ralph Hemecker, served as director for the episode. The Who's Roger Daltrey made an uncredited cameo appearance as the voice of the hookah-smoking caterpillar (that only says "Who...Are...You?").

This episode was the first of several for actor Sebastian Stan, as his character, Jefferson, recurred in two more episodes during season one. Producers stated that there was a possibility for him to return in season two, but that was before Stan became a series regular on the upcoming limited run USA drama Political Animals. Stan would eventually return in the second season.

The episode was included in Reawakened: A Once Upon a Time Tale – a novelization of the first season – which was published by Hyperion Books in 2013.

== Reception ==
=== Ratings ===
The episode's ratings and viewership was up slightly, but continued to remain steady, scoring an 18-49 rating of 2.9/8 and was watched by 8.82 million viewers, as well as winning its timeslot.

In Canada, the episode finished in nineteenth place for the week with an estimated 1.337 million viewers, an increase from the 1.254 million of the previous episode.

== Cast ==
=== Starring ===
- Ginnifer Goodwin as Mary Margaret Blanchard
- Jennifer Morrison as Emma Swan
- Lana Parrilla as Evil Queen/Regina Mills
- Josh Dallas (credit only)
- Eion Bailey (credit only)
- Jared S. Gilmore as Henry Mills
- Raphael Sbarge (credit only)
- Robert Carlyle as Mr. Gold

=== Guest Starring ===
- Giancarlo Esposito as Magic Mirror
- Tony Perez as Prince Henry
- Sebastian Stan as Mad Hatter/Jefferson

=== Co-Starring ===
- Alissa Skovbye as Grace/Paige
- Jennifer Koenig as Queen of Hearts
- Paul McGillion as Knave of Hearts
- Scott E. Miller as Grace's Caretaker/Mr. Grace
- Laura Wilson as Grace's Caretaker/Mrs. Grace

=== Uncredited ===
- Roger Daltrey as Caterpillar (voice)
- Barbara Hershey as Queen of Hearts (voice)
