= Welcome to Storybrooke =

- Once Upon a Time episode
- Episode no.: Season 2 Episode 17
- Directed by: David M. Barrett
- Written by: Ian Goldberg; Andrew Chambliss
- Original air date: March 17, 2013

Guest appearances
- Tony Amendola as Geppetto/Marco; Jamie Dornan as The Huntsman/Sheriff Graham; Beverley Elliott as Granny; Ethan Embry as Greg Mendell/Owen Flyyn; John Pyper-Ferguson as Kurt Flynn; Michael Raymond-James as Baelfire/Neal Cassidy; Raphael Sbarge as Jiminy Cricket/Dr. Archibald "Archie" Hopper; Benjamin Stockham as young Owen Flynn

Episode chronology
| ← Previous "The Miller's Daughter" | Next → "Selfless, Brave and True" |
- Once Upon a Time season 2

"Welcome to Storybrooke" is the 17th episode of the second season of the American ABC fantasy/drama television series Once Upon a Time, and the show's 39th episode overall. It aired on March 17, 2013.

It was co-written by Ian Goldberg and Andrew Chambliss, and was directed by David M. Barrett.

This episode centers around Regina as she tries to get revenge on Mary Margaret, while flashbacks show Regina's past with Greg Mendell.

== Title card ==
A tree falls in a storm on a 1980s sport utility vehicle in the Enchanted Forest.

== Plot ==
=== In the Characters' Past ===
In 1983, Kurt Flynn and his young son Owen are camping in the Maine woods when they stumble upon Storybrooke. Regina invites Kurt and Owen to dine at her home and invites them to relocate to Storybrooke. The next day, Regina learns the Flynns are leaving. She uses Graham's heart to order him to arrest Kurt and abduct Owen for her. Kurt orders Owen to run as far as he can, which he does while Graham arrests Kurt. Owen returns with police officers, but Storybrooke is no longer evident. Owen vows never to stop looking for his father, while Regina weeps as she reaches out to him from inside Storybrooke.

=== In Storybrooke ===
As Regina prepares to bury Cora, Gold comes to pay his respects. Regina intends to kill Snow White, but Gold points out that would cost her Henry.

Emma reveals that Mary Margaret had a role in Cora's death, but Henry does not believe Snow White would hurt someone. Gold arrives to warn them that Regina plans to kill Mary Margaret, and David demands that Gold save her as repayment for Mary Margaret for saving his life.

A distraught Regina ransacks her mother's belongings until she finds the ingredients for a love spell for which the final ingredient is the heart of the person the caster hates most — Mary Margaret. Henry realizes Regina plans to use the curse on him. Regina tells Henry that he means too much to her for her to lose him; he asks her to prove it by not casting the curse. She insists that the imitation of love created by the curse will make them happy, but he refuses her offer, his response echoing Owen's in 1983. It is revealed that Greg is the adult Owen Flynn.

== Cultural references ==
Owen refers to the green and red lightsabers of Star Wars characters Luke Skywalker and Darth Vader. Also, Owen is the name of Luke Skywalker's uncle in Star Wars.

Kurt mentions that New Jersey is the home of "The Boss", Bruce Springsteen.

Kurt and Owen's last name, Flynn, is a reference to Tron: Legacy, written by series co-creators Adam Horowitz and Edward Kitsis. In that film, Sam Flynn searches for his father Kevin in a hidden world. In addition, a street bench has a 1983 advertisement for ENCOM personal computers, the fictional computer corporation in both Tron and Tron: Legacy.

The name Greg Mendell is a reference to Gregor Mendel "the father of modern genetics".

== Reception ==
=== Ratings ===
The outing saw a slight increase in the ratings, placing 2.3/6 among 18-49s with 7.45 million viewers tuning in.

=== Reviews ===
The episode was met with positive reviews.

Oliver Sava of The A.V. Club gave this episode a "B+" and wrote, "After two strong episodes, it’s beginning to seem like Once Upon A Time is preparing to end the season on a high note, but things can fall apart at any instant. And that’s the big problem with shows as inconsistent as this one."
