= Ralph Hemecker =

Film and television director (1961–2026)

- Born: June 12, 1961
- Died: July 10, 2026 (aged 65); Glendale, California, U.S.
- Occupations: Film and television director, writer, and producer

Ralph William Hemecker (June 12, 1961 – July 10, 2026) was an American film and television director, writer and producer. He directed episodes of the drama series Once Upon a Time and The Flash.

== Early life and education ==
Hemecker was born on June 12, 1961. He studied English at Bucknell University and graduated. He also took filmmaking courses at New York University.

== Career ==
In 2000, Hemecker founded Mythic Films, a full service feature film, TV and commercial production company. After directing Witchblade, Hemecker served as the showrunner, writer, and producer for the subsequent television series, which aired from 2000 to 2002.

Hemecker directed episodes of Renegade, Dead at 21, Millennium, Numb3rs, V, Blue Bloods, and Nikita. He directed 21 episodes of the ABC fantasy/drama series Once Upon a Time.

In 2014, he joined as a recurring director on The CW superhero series The Flash. He directed the first-season episode, "Tricksters", in which Mark Hamill reprised the role of the titular supervillain. He also directed the second season crossover episode with Arrow, "Legends of Today". In the third season, Hemecker returned to direct the second episode of the season, "Paradox".

== Death ==
Hemecker died in Glendale, California on July 10, 2026, at the age of 65.

== Filmography ==
=== Television credits ===
Year	Show	Season	Episode title	Episode	Credit
1991	Silk Stalkings	1	"S.O.B."	3	Director
1991	Silk Stalkings	1	"Men Seeking Women"	6	Director
1992	Silk Stalkings	1	"The Brotherhood"	9	Director
1992	Silk Stalkings	1	"Blo-Dri"	10	Director
1992	Silk Stalkings	1	"Powder Burn"	20	Director
1992	Silk Stalkings	2	"Good Time Charlie"	2	Director
1993	Silk Stalkings	2	"Irreconcilable Differences"	11	Director
1993	Silk Stalkings	2	"Was It Good for You Too?"	14	Director
1993	Silk Stalkings	3	"Love Never Dies"	7	Director
1994	Silk Stalkings	4	"Red Flag"	7	Director
1992	Renegade	1	"Renegade"	1	Director
1992	Renegade	1	"Final Judgment"	3	Director
1992	Renegade	1	"Payback"	8	Director
1993	Renegade	1	"Fighting Cage, Part 1"	21	Director
1993	Renegade	2	"Wheel Man"	9	Director
1994	Renegade	2	"Once Burned, Twice Chey"	18	Director
1994	Renegade	2	"Murderer's Row, Part 1"	20	Director
1994	Renegade	2	"Murderer's Row, Part 2"	21	Director
1994	Renegade	3	"Escape"	3	Director
1994	Renegade	3	"Black Wind"	5	Director
1995	Renegade	3	"Den of Thieves"	12	Director
1994	Dead at 21	1	"Dead at 21"	1	Director
1994	Dead at 21	1	"Brain Salad"	2	Director
1994	Dead at 21	1	"Shock the Monkey"	4	Director
1994	Dead at 21	1	"Hotel California"	11	Director
1994	Dead at 21	1	"In Through the Out Door: Part 1"	12	Director
1994	Dead at 21	1	"In Through the Out Door: Part 2"	13	Director
1995	Vanishing Son	1	"Runaway Hearts"	7	Director
1995	Vanishing Son	1	"Win, Place or Dead"	10	Director
1996	Kindred: The Embraced	1	"Romeo and Juliet"	4	Director
1996	Kindred: The Embraced	1	"Cabin in the Woods"	8	Director
1996	Millennium	1	"The Well-Worn Lock"	8	Director
1997	Millennium	2	"The Curse of Frank Black"	6	Director
1998	Millennium	3	"Exegesis"	2	Director
1997	Roar	1	Pilot	1	Director
1998	The X-Files	5	Schizogeny	9	Director
2001	Witchblade	1	"Parallax"	1	Director; Story; Teleplay
2001	Witchblade	1	"Conundrum"	2	Story
2001	Witchblade	1	"Diplopia"	3	Story
2001	Witchblade	1	"Sacrifice"	4	Story
2001	Witchblade	1	"Legion"	5	Story
2001	Witchblade	1	"Maelstrom"	6	Story
2001	Witchblade	1	"Periculum"	7	Story
2001	Witchblade	1	"Thanatopis"	8	Story
2001	Witchblade	1	"Apprehension"	9	Story
2001	Witchblade	1	"Convergence"	10	Story; Teleplay
2001	Witchblade	1	"Transcendence"	11	Story; Teleplay
2002	Witchblade	2	"Emergence"	1	Writer
2002	Witchblade	2	"Destiny"	2	Teleplay
2002	Witchblade	2	"Parabolic"	10	Writer
2002	Witchblade	2	"Ubique"	12	Writer
2007	Numb3rs	4	"Thirteen"	4	Director
2008	Numb3rs	5	"The Decoy Effect"	2	Director
2009	Numb3rs	5	"12:01 AM"	18	Director
2009	Numb3rs	6	"Hydra"	5	Director
2009	Numb3rs	6	"Con Job"	9	Director
2010	Numb3rs	6	"And the Winner Is…"	14	Director
2010	Ghost Whisperer	5	"Dead to Me"	14	Director
2010	The Vampire Diaries	2	"The Sacrifice"	10	Director
2010	Blue Bloods	1	"Samaritan"	2	Director
2010	Blue Bloods	1	"Officer Down"	4	Director
2011	Blue Bloods	1	"Silver Star"	17	Director
2011	Blue Bloods	2	"Critical Condition"	3	Director
2011	Blue Bloods	2	"A Night on the Town"	5	Director
2012	Blue Bloods	2	"Collateral Damage"	21	Director
2012	Blue Bloods	3	"Risk and Reward"	5	Director
2012	Blue Bloods	3	"Greener Grass"	6	Director
2013	Blue Bloods	4	"Drawing Dead"	7	Director
2014	Blue Bloods	5	"Most Wanted"	6	Director
2017	Blue Bloods	7	"Love Lost"	19	Director
2017	Blue Bloods	8	"The Forgotten"	5	Director
2018	Blue Bloods	8	"Your Six"	20	Director
2018	Blue Bloods	9	"Blackout"	4	Director
2019	Blue Bloods	9	"Ripple Effect"	13	Director
2019	Blue Bloods	9	"Two-Faced"	17	Director
2019	Blue Bloods	10	"Behind the Smile"	3	Director
2021	Blue Bloods	11	"Guardian Angels"	11	Director
2021	Blue Bloods	12	"True Blue"	4	Director
2021	Blue Bloods	12	"USA Today"	7	Director
2022	Blue Bloods	12	"Guilt"	16	Director
2022	Blue Bloods	12	"Long Lost"	18	Director
2022	Blue Bloods	12	"Silver Linings"	20	Director
2011	V	2	"Devil in the Blue Dress"	9	Director
2011	Nikita	1	"Glass Houses"	20	Director
2012	NYC 22	1	"Turf War"	6	Director
2012	NYC 22	1	"Self Cleaning Oven"	12	Director
2012	Once Upon a Time	1	"7:15 A.M."	10	Director
2012	Once Upon a Time	1	"Hat Trick"	17	Director
2012	Once Upon a Time	2	"Broken"	1	Director
2012	Once Upon a Time	2	"Queen of Hearts"	9	Director
2013	Once Upon a Time	2	"The Miller's Daughter"	16	Director
2013	Once Upon a Time	2	"Selfless, Brave and True"	18	Director
2013	Once Upon a Time	2	"Second Star to the Right"	21	Director
2013	Once Upon a Time	3	"The Heart of the Truest Believer"	1	Director
2013	Once Upon a Time	3	"Going Home"	11	Director
2014	Once Upon a Time	3	"The Tower"	14	Director
2014	Once Upon a Time	3	"A Curious Thing"	19	Director
2014	Once Upon a Time	3	"There's No Place Like Home"	22	Director
2014	Once Upon a Time	4	"A Tale of Two Sisters"	1	Director
2014	Once Upon a Time	4	"The Apprentice"	4	Director
2014	Once Upon a Time	4	"Smash the Mirror" (part 2)	8(B)	Director
2014	Once Upon a Time	4	"Heroes and Villains"	12	Director
2015	Once Upon a Time	4	"Enter the Dragon"	15	Director
2015	Once Upon a Time	4	"Lily"	20	Director
2015	Once Upon a Time	4	"Operation Mongoose, Part 2"	23	Director
2015	Once Upon a Time	5	"Siege Perilous"	3	Director
2015	Once Upon a Time	5	"The Bear and the Bow"	6	Director
2016	Once Upon a Time	5	"Souls of the Departed"	12	Director
2016	Once Upon a Time	6	"Heartless"	7	Director
2017	Once Upon a Time	6	"The Final Battle, Part 2"	22	Director
2017	Once Upon a Time	7	"Hyperion Heights"	1	Director
2017	Once Upon a Time	7	"Pretty in Blue"	8	Director
2017	Once Upon a Time	7	"The Eighth Witch"	10	Director
2018	Once Upon a Time	7	"Leaving Storybrooke"	22	Director
2013	Once Upon a Time in Wonderland	1	"Down the Rabbit Hole"	1	Director
2013	Once Upon a Time in Wonderland	1	"The Serpent"	4	Director
2014	The Flash	1	"The Man in the Yellow Suit"	9	Director
2015	The Flash	1	"Tricksters"	17	Director
2015	The Flash	2	"The Man Who Saved Central City"	1	Director
2015	The Flash	2	"Legends of Today"	8	Director
2016	The Flash	3	"Paradox"	2	Director
2018	The Flash	4	"Subject 19"	14	Director
2016	Legends of Tomorrow	2	"The Chicago Way"	8	Director
2017	Legends of Tomorrow	2	"Land of the Lost"	13	Director
2018	Legends of Tomorrow	3	"Guest Starring John Noble"	17	Director
2017	Quantico	2	"Fallenoracle"	12	Director
