= Leaving Storybrooke =

- Once Upon a Time episode
- Episode no.: Season 7 Episode 22
- Directed by: Ralph Hemecker
- Written by: Edward Kitsis; Adam Horowitz
- Original air date: May 18, 2018

Guest appearances
- Ginnifer Goodwin as Snow White / Mary Margaret Blanchard (special guest star); Jennifer Morrison as Emma Swan (special guest star); Josh Dallas as Prince Charming / David Nolan (special guest star); Emilie de Ravin as Belle (special guest star); Rebecca Mader as Zelena / Kelly West (special guest star); Jared S. Gilmore as Sir Henry (Wish Realm) (special guest star); Tony Amendola as Geppetto/Marco; Lee Arenberg as Grumpy/Leroy; Meghan Ory as Ruby/Red Riding Hood; Beverley Elliott as Granny; Christopher Gauthier as Smee; Sean Maguire as Robin Hood; Rose Reynolds as Alice/Tilly; Tiera Skovbye as Robin/Margot; Raphael Sbarge as Archie Hopper; Keegan Connor Tracy as Blue Fairy; David Avalon as Doc (co-starring); Faustino di Bauda as Sleepy/Walter (co-starring); Jack Davies as Pinocchio (co-starring); Gabe Khouth as Sneezy / Mr. Clark (co-starring); Abigayle Laura Mutch as five-year-old Robin (co-starring)

Episode chronology
← Previous "Homecoming"	Next → —
- Once Upon a Time season 7

"Leaving Storybrooke" is the series finale of the American fantasy-drama series Once Upon a Time. It is the twenty-second episode of the seventh season and the 155th episode overall. Written by the show's creators, Edward Kitsis and Adam Horowitz, and directed by Ralph Hemecker, it premiered on ABC in the United States on May 18, 2018.

In the episode, the Wish Realm Rumplestiltskin's plan to eliminate all the happy endings of all the characters in every realm is revealed, as Sir Henry prepares to kill Regina as part of the scheme, while Alice and Robin seek out help from Storybrooke to rescue Henry, Jacinda, Lucy, Hook, and Weaver, who is ready to risk everything to stop his evil counterpart from carrying out his plan.

== Plot ==
=== Opening sequence ===
The "Leaving Storybrooke" city limits sign is displayed. The Seattle scenery is not featured.

=== Event chronology ===
The Wish Realm events and the outcome involving the realms from previous encounters occur after the events of "Homecoming".

=== In Storybrooke ===
As Alice and Robin arrive in Storybrooke, they find the dwarves, Granny, Archie and Pongo. They explain that a fifth Dark Curse took them, along with the future versions of Henry, Regina and Mr. Gold to Seattle in the past, which is in the present day. However, due to the numerous outsiders in the past that has caused Storybrooke trouble, they are met with disbelief and hostility. The townspeople chase Alice and Robin into hiding. As they hide from the residents, Alice and Robin encounter Zelena, and Robin figures out that her mother was driving her younger self to daycare. Convinced, Zelena and the other two seek out David and Mary Margaret.

=== In the Wish Realm ===
Inside the snow globe prison, Henry is reunited with Ella and Lucy. Weaver explains to Hook that Wish Realm Rumplestiltskin has stripped him of his powers and immortality, and that his Wish Realm counterpart had used them to amplify his own powers. As they attempt to break the glass, Hook asks Weaver why he never killed him and Weaver admits that Hook is the closest thing he's ever had to a friend. Suddenly, Maui's fishhook appears in the snowglobe, with the handle sticking up out of the snow. Hook grabs it and uses it to start breaking the glass from the inside; from the outside, a pair of arrows pierce the glass, and they’re freed by Robin and Alice.

Regina is dragged to the location where Wish Snow and Wish Charming had been married, by Sir Henry. Regina pleads with Sir Henry to change his mind despite admitting to having killed his grandparents. Sir Henry responded to her plea by cutting a slit on her hand (that Henry will use to create blood ink) and tells her that they’ll fight each other, which Sir Henry says that will be his happy ending. While locked in a cell, Regina has a dream, in which she meets with Robin Sr's spirit. Robin encourages her, telling her that she can still find happiness without him or Facilier, and that just needs to show Sir Henry that he can still find love. Awakening, Regina discovers that Robin's spirit had left her with a red feather from one of his arrows.

Wish Rumple meets up with Sir Henry to discuss Regina’s fate, offering Sir Henry a new way to deal with every character and their stories from every realm utilizing Regina’s blood ink. He shows Sir Henry that if he raises his emotions, he can banish the heroes into the “Once Upon a Time” books that will serve as their prison. They test it on Wish Blue Fairy, who is then transported to a dark realm where she will be tormented, with her book closing afterwards.

Weaver finds a dream-catcher and views his memories of Belle, fearing that he will never be with her. Meanwhile, Hook and Robin scout the castle, where Robin asks Hook for his blessing to marry Alice, to which Hook approves, as they prepare to face off against the guards. Meanwhile, Henry heads to rescue Regina, but he ends up getting ambushed by the guards. Before the guards can kill Henry, they are taken out by Mary Margaret and David. The group discovers Wish Rumple's plan to trap each and everyone of them in separate realms of unhappy endings, and they come up with a strategy to save all the realms and to stop Wish Rumple from enacting his scheme. As they come up with a plan, Wish Rumple shows up, ready to trap the characters in realms of eternal torment, while Sir Henry shows up in the forest to confront Regina and forces her into a sword fight, which causes the portals to open, powered by Sir Henry’s emotions. When Sir Henry corners Regina, she tells him that if she needs to die to show him that he's loved, it's a worthy end for her story. Sir Henry eventually forfeits, causing the portals to close, saving everyone. Sir Henry and Regina reconcile afterwards.

Meanwhile, as Hook had to hold onto Alice to keep her out of the portals, his heart is now poisoned beyond repair. Weaver, who earlier had found a way to kill his Wish counterpart, decides to sacrifice his heart to save Hook, which erases the Darkness within his own heart when he makes this decision. Ignoring Wish Rumple's protests, Weaver slams his purified heart into Hook's body, saving Hook and causing Wish Rumple to disintegrate into dust. The original Rumple is then reunited with Belle in the afterlife.

Later that evening, Regina is joined by the two Henrys. Having realized that it is time to heal everything, she decides to bring all the realms of story to Storybrooke by enacting a new curse, using small part of the hearts of everyone who loves her and those whom she loves.

=== In the United Realms ===
Some time later, all the realms of the magical universe are brought inside Storybrooke's town limits, hidden away from the rest of the world. As Zelena and Henry drive Regina to the palace for a surprise, Regina reveals that Zorro is the father of Lily, Maleficent's daughter. Snow and David surprises Regina with the announcement that the people have voted to elect Regina the leader of the newly united realms, and is joined by Emma, the original Hook and their baby daughter Hope at the last minute. Snow then crowns Regina with the new title of "the Good Queen". Regina then gives a speech about second chances and despite what everyone has been through to find their happiness, lives, and stories will continue on.

After Regina gives her speech with unanimous cheers as Emma, Hook, and Hope look on in support, the scene zooms out of the castle and moves toward Storybrooke, where it shows the different parts of the town including Granny's Diner, Gold's shop, stores along the main street, and the clock tower. The series ends with a shot of the town line, zooming in on the "Leaving Storybrooke" sign.

== Reception ==
TV Fanatic gave the episode a 4.2 out of 5 stars. Justin Kirkland of Entertainment Weekly gave the episode a B−, noting: "Gather your tissues, kids, because this is the last chapter of Once Upon a Time. Are you ready? Can you ever be? This show has been such a weird little nugget of television that dared to try to reinvent all the classic fairy tales we grew up reading and put them into a modern, albeit at times messy, new narrative. For better and for worse, the show has been nothing if not ambitious, and tonight, we get to see the culmination of everything in one sublimely sweet final scene."
