= Emma Swan =

Fictional character

- Once Upon a Time character
- Promotional photograph of Jennifer Morrison as Emma Swan.
- First appearance: "Pilot"
- Last appearance: "Leaving Storybrooke"
- Created by: Adam Horowitz; Edward Kitsis
- Portrayed by: Jennifer Morrison (adult); Abby Ross (teenager); Mckenna Grace (child)

In-universe information
- Aliases: The Savior; Swan; Mom; Ms. Swan; Love; The Dark One (Season 5); Dark Swan (Season 5); Princess Emma (alternate reality); Mrs. Jones (Season 6-7)
- Occupation: Sheriff; Deputy (briefly); Bail bondswoman (briefly); Princess of the Enchanted Forest (alternate reality)
- Family: Prince Charming/David Nolan (father); Snow White/Mary Margaret Blanchard (mother); Neal Nolan (younger brother)
- Spouse: Killian Jones
- Children: Henry Mills; Hope Swan-Jones
- Relatives: King Leopold (maternal grandfather; deceased); Queen Eva (maternal grandmother; deceased); Regina Mills/Evil Queen (step-grandmother); Ruth (paternal grandmother; deceased); Robert (paternal grandfather; deceased); Prince James (paternal uncle; deceased); Ella/Jacinda Vidrio (daughter-in-law); Lucy Mills (granddaughter)

Emma Swan is a fictional character and the protagonist of ABC's television series Once Upon a Time. She is portrayed by Jennifer Morrison as an adult, by Abby Ross as a teenager, and by Mckenna Grace as a child. Emma appears in the series' pilot as a bail bond agent in Boston, Massachusetts, until she meets her biological son Henry, whom she gave up for adoption 10 years before. She learns she is the long lost daughter of Snow White and Prince Charming who gave her up shortly after her birth 28 years ago so she wouldn't die at the hands of Regina Mills, also known as the Evil Queen. Sadly, she doesn’t learn this vital information until the beginning of season two. Henry tells Emma of her true identity; she is the prophesied “Savior” and is destined to break the Evil Queen’s curse, saving the fictional town of Storybrooke, Maine, and restoring the residents’ (all cursed fairy tale characters) happy endings.

Morrison described her character at the beginning of the first season as "broken, damaged and worldly." During the fourth season finale, "Operation Mongoose," Emma absorbs the power of the Dark One into herself to save Regina. In order to successfully create a dark version of Emma, Morrison explained that "In order to build Dark Emma, I've been doing a bunch of research there with some of their mythology books and old fairy tale books and just looking back through the history of swans and the etymology of 'Swan'" and explained that Emma's rate of evolution "challenged [her] on a daily basis." Emma became the primary antagonist of the fifth season's first half, until the end of the season's eighth episode when it is revealed that she was never actually evil and was an anti-villain during that time.

Morrison's portrayal of Emma has received praise, with some reviewers noting a feminist twist in the depiction of fairy tales and a strong female lead. She is loosely based on the title character of the fairy tale "The Ugly Duckling," a swan which was lost and raised by ducks, before finding its birth family and recognizing its true nature, while her Dark One persona is loosely based on Odile from the ballet Swan Lake. It is revealed in the season 6 episode "Tougher Than the Rest" that she chose the last name Swan when she was young after a friend mentioned that story.

== Character development and casting ==
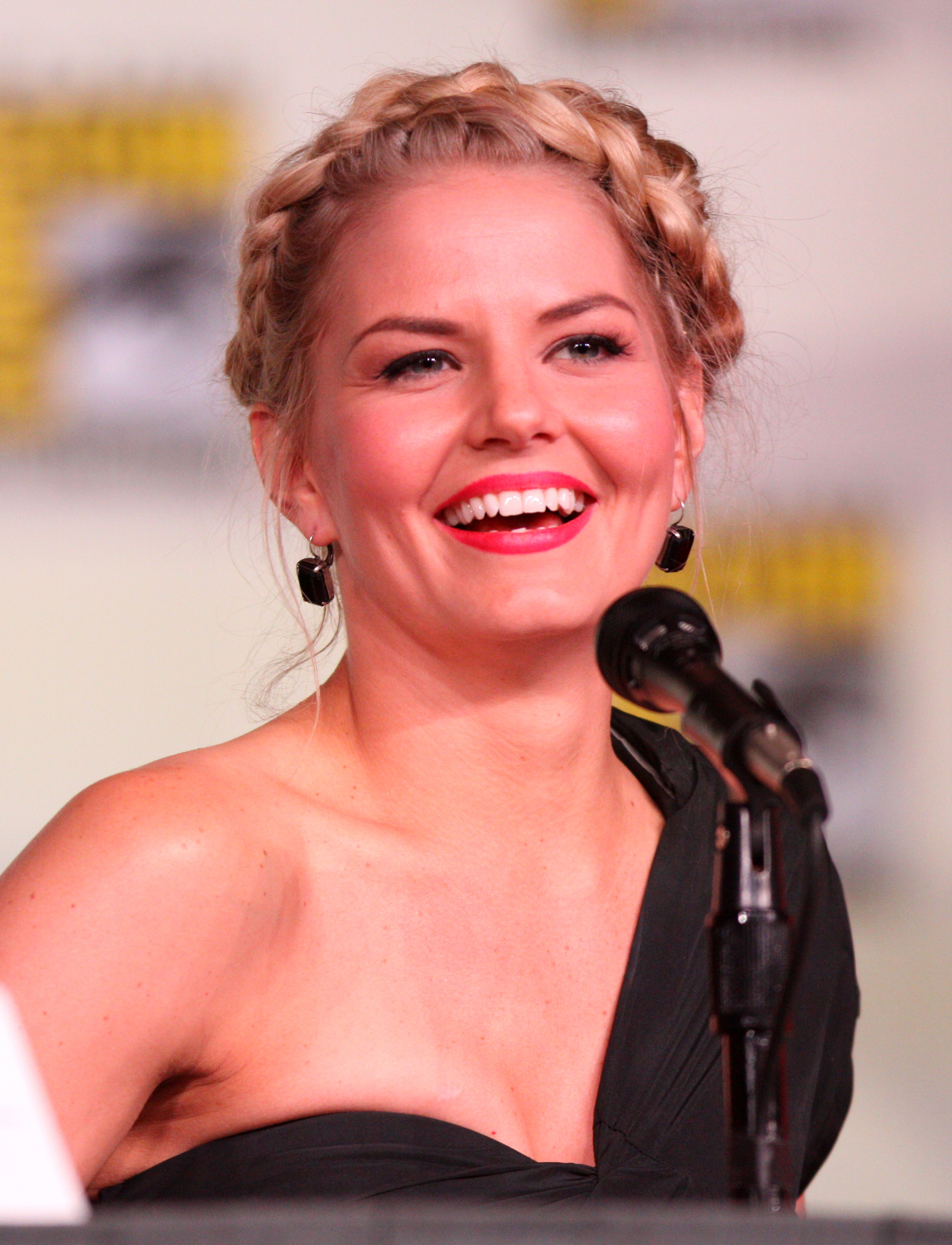
Jennifer Morrison at the 2012 San Diego Comic-Con.

In the early stages of the conception of the character, Emma's name was Anna, and she was supposed to have three children, but she ended up having just Henry. In the original script of the pilot she is described as "Late 20s. Beautiful, with great strength behind classic features. But also not quite at home in her skin."

It was reported that actress Katee Sackhoff auditioned five times for the role of Emma but, according to her, the producers really wanted Morrison to play the part, and she accepted a role in the television series Longmire. In the end, Morrison was hired for the part of Emma. Morrison explained her character as someone who "help[s] her son Henry whom she abandoned when he was a baby and who seems like he's a little bit emotionally dysfunctional," but noted that Emma does not start out believing in the fairytale universe. Morrison has described Emma as being like an overgrown teenager who does not know how to properly do certain things, like eating or taking care of herself; this is due to Emma not growing up in a family unit. Morrison said that when she does not know what to do with Emma, she thinks, "What a 14-year-old boy would do?" According to the creators of the series, the name Swan is "very symbolic and fairy tale name and it just felt right for her and for the journey we are creating for Emma."

After Emma became the "Dark One" at the end of the fourth season of the series, Morrison began doing research with mythology books and old fairy tale books and looking back through the history of swans and the etymology of 'Swan' to prepare for this new trait of her character. Morrison said that it was a great opportunity to now play a villain and it was challenging for her to portray a character that is constantly evolving.

== Character Background ==
Emma is the daughter of Snow White and Prince Charming, older sister to Prince Neal, wife of Killian Jones/Captain Hook and mother to Henry Daniel Mills and Hope Swan-Jones.

=== Seasons 1 & 2 ===
When Snow White becomes pregnant, Geppetto forms a magical wardrobe for her and Charming, after Rumplestiltskin informs them that their daughter is the key to breaking the Evil Queen's curse in 28 years. Emma is born shortly after and placed in the wardrobe along with Pinocchio, successfully traveling to the new land. Pinocchio leaves Emma in the foster home, which brings Emma to live alone.

In the real world, Emma grows up in foster care, bouncing from various families, one including Ingrid, the Snow Queen. As a teenager, Emma becomes a petty criminal with Neal Cassidy. They plan to start a new life in Tallahassee, Florida, until Neal is persuaded by August Booth (Pinocchio) to turn Emma over to the police, to protect her destiny. Emma is jailed, later giving birth to Henry, whom she gives up for adoption to give him a better life; he is then adopted by Regina Mills (the Evil Queen). After some time in prison, Emma becomes a bail bond agent. On her 28th birthday, a 10-year-old Henry Mills arrives in Boston, explaining Emma's origins. Disbelieving him, she returns him home to Regina in Storybrooke, who becomes worried that Emma wants to be in Henry's life. Regina's repeated warnings to leave town and keep out of Henry's life make Emma decide to stay. In Storybrooke, Emma initially wants Henry to let go of his theories of the curse, but later plays along. She moves in with Mary Margaret (Snow White), unaware that they are related, and Sheriff Graham appoints Emma his deputy as the two form an attraction, until Regina crushes his heart, causing him to die in Emma's arms. Emma is soon elected sheriff, assisting in the arrest of Mary Margaret for the alleged murder of Kathryn Nolan until she is found alive. When August Booth (Pinocchio) arrives in Storybrooke revealing her destiny of breaking the curse, a pressured Emma decides to leave the town, not wanting Henry to suffer from her and Regina's feud. Regina, however, attempts to poison Emma, though Henry willingly consumes it to prove that magic exists. Emma finally believes, but Henry is pronounced dead. However, he is awoken with true love's kiss from Emma, thus breaking the curse and allowing all residents to remember their true identities.

Emma reunites with her parents, only to fall through a portal with her mother to the Enchanted Forest. They meet Princess Aurora and Mulan who help them return to Storybrooke. Emma then helps Mr. Gold travel to Manhattan to locate his son Baelfire, who she discovers is Henry's father Neal. Returning to Storybrooke, Emma deals with Regina and her mother Cora who are trying to use Mr. Gold to kill them and take back Henry but they eventually stop them then end up dealing with newcomers Greg Mendell and Neal's fiancée Tamara. Emma's skeptical theories on the pair are proven correct when it is revealed they want to destroy magic. After Emma and Regina stop their trigger to destroy Storybrooke, Henry is taken to Neverland by Greg and Tamara; Emma, Neal, her parents, Regina, Hook and Mr. Gold follow them.

=== Seasons 3 & 4 ===
The team eventually manages to rescue Henry from the sinister Peter Pan, and return to Storybrooke. However, Pan enacts the original curse once more, forcing Emma and Henry to leave Storybrooke after Regina reverses her curse, erasing the events following its enactment. Emma's past is temporarily altered by Regina. After leaving Storybrooke, Emma lives with Henry in New York City. Sometime later, she meets Walsh and they begin dating.

One year after the curse's reversal, Hook restores Emma's memories with a potion and the two return to Storybrooke with Henry to save her family by breaking the new curse caused by Zelena, the Wicked Witch of the West. She finds an insane Neal trapped within Mr. Gold's body. Losing his mind, Neal asks for Emma to free his father by killing him to defeat Zelena; she reluctantly agrees. Regina later helps Emma to strengthen her magical powers, though they are removed when Zelena curses Hook but thanks to Regina they managed to defeat Zelena and close her time portal.

After Emma and Hook are dragged into Zelena's time portal, she accepts Storybrooke as her home, regaining her magic to re-open the portal to the present where she begins a relationship with Hook. However, unaware to her, she also brings a previously deceased Maid Marian to the future which ruins Regina's happiness, having not heeded the warning of messing with the past. Elsa, who was trapped in an urn, was also brought to Storybrooke by the time portal. While working with Elsa, who helps Emma to finally embrace and control her powers, Emma helps her new friend find her sister and return home while balancing the threat of the Snow Queen, who turns out to have been one of Emma's foster mothers, against her friends and family. After a period of peace, Emma begins to help Regina on her quest to find the Author of Henry's book. Cruella De Vil and Ursula soon come into town resurrecting Maleficent and working with Rumplestiltskin to find the very same author, intent on giving villains their happy endings. After Cruella De Vil threatens to kill Henry, Emma kills her, soon after learning of her parents' actions of removing Emma's potential for darkness by putting black magic within Maleficent's daughter and Emma's childhood friend Lily. She also learns that her entire life is controlled by destiny. After Emma returns to town, with the encouragement from Hook, she chooses to forgive, apologizes to her parents for how she unjustly mistreated them, and let go of her anger. But little did she know it or bothered to, but the author was the one who made her parents hurt Maleficent and Lily under the writing of his pen in order to hurt both because he foolishly believed they and real heroes represent his bad bosses from his past. In moments before the finale, Emma is able to finally let her walls down and tells Hook she loves him. Emma then chooses to sacrifice herself for the town of Storybrooke, asking her parents and Hook to save her, she voluntarily plunges the dagger into the Darkness, transforming into the new Dark One.

=== Season 5 ===
Emma searches for Merlin and is helped by a manifestation of Rumplestiltskin, who wants to teach her to be the Dark One, while Emma attempts to resist becoming evil at the same time. Sometime later, she transformed Hook into a second Dark One to save his life. Hook then cast the Dark Curse to get back to Storybrooke to have his revenge on Mr. Gold. Emma then altered the curse, adding a dreamcatcher in it to wipe out everyone's memories of their time in Camelot.

Six weeks later, the rest of her friends returned to Storybrooke, with their memories were wiped out once again. Emma made an appearance as the Dark One, with her new attire. Henry asks what happened to her, and she told them that they all went to Camelot to remove the darkness from her and they all failed (except Henry). Emma with her powers turned Sneezy into stone, proclaiming that there's no savior in the town that cast the surge of hope in everybody. Emma surprisingly gave the Dark One dagger to Regina with the intention that if she goes too dark Regina would be the only one that would willingly kill her. Shortly after this, Hook attempts true love's kiss with Emma in the hopes that the Dark One's curse would break, but ultimately failed as Emma had fully embraced the darkness.

Unbeknownst to the others, Emma currently has possession of the Excalibur in a locked room inside of her new house. She intends to make Excalibur and the Dark One's dagger whole again, as with it she will be able to snuff out the light forever and become invulnerable. However, she must recruit a hero to do so, as she cannot remove the sword; the hero she chooses is her predecessor Rumplestiltskin, who she tells finally has a chance to become a hero. She planned to siphon the darkness out of both of them and put it in Zelena, who she forced into accelerated labor to avoid killing Robin's child and slay her. But her plans get foiled after Hook helped Zelena in the witch in return reveals to the pirate what Emma did to him before he stole her memories. After being berated for her actions and not being trusted by everyone else for her deception for a while. Later on, like all her love ones, she and the others regain their memories of what Hook plans, by resurrecting all the Dark Ones as part of his revenge. At first, Emma plans to absorb all the darkness inside her and kill herself. Things do not go according to plan when Hook steals it from her. Killian orders her to kill him, taking in all the darkness and Emma slays him with Excalibur while the darkness is removed from her, reverting to her old self. After blackmailing Mr. Gold for tricking her and Hook into making him the Dark One again, she and her friends and family descend into the Underworld to find Hook and plans to split her heart in half and share it with him like her parents.

Arriving in the Underworld, Emma is contacted by Neal Cassidy, who warns to turn back, advice Emma chooses to ignore. She and the others later discover that the Underworld is for those with unfinished business, and they decide to help others move on, while they search for Hook. With the help of Hook's ex-girlfriend Milah, Emma manages to retrieve Hook from Hades's captivity. However, she is unable to split her heart, as Hades has decided that she, Regina, and Snow are to remain behind for freeing the souls of Prince Henry, Hercules, and Megara. It is discovered that the only way they would have a chance to return to the "Overworld" with Hook is by overthrowing Hades. In order to defeat Hades, Emma and Hook receive help from Hook's brother Liam; however, it is soon discovered that Liam betrayed them after being blackmailed by Hades. Fortunately, Henry agrees to help undo Liam's work by using his powers as the Author. Later, when Emma and Hook try to perform the heartsplit, they are informed by Hades that Hook's body has been dead for too long and is decaying, making him unable to come back to life. When Emma and Hook go into the depths of the Underworld to find ambrosia, something that would save Hook, they are faced with a True Love test, which they pass when Emma chooses Hook over her own heart, only to realize that Hades had tricked them and destroyed the ambrosia, and Hook tells Emma to leave him in the Underworld, as time is running out for her to go through the open portal. Emma objects, saying that she came to the Underworld to save Hook, and she wasn't leaving without him. Hook eventually gets her to say her goodbyes and she does, only to find out that Hades had trapped her and her family in the library using magic. Emma and Regina work together to use their own magic to counteract it.

They all go through the portal, and while Emma has second thoughts about leaving Hook, she is persuaded to go by her father. When they get back to Storybrooke, Zelena is informed by Regina and Robin that Hades tried to trap them in the Underworld, but she brushes off the information and is upset with her sister. She talks to Hades about having the life she wants, which is just a simple picket fence life. However, Hades wants a whole kingdom. Robin and Regina break into the mayor's house, where Zelena and Hades are, trying to get Robin's daughter back from Zelena. Emma, distraught and unable to grieve Hook's death, tries to break down the protection spell surrounding the house, but Zelena uses her magic to stop her. Hades is about to use the Olympian Crystal to "end" Regina, but Robin steps in front of her, taking the blow, which kills him. Hades tries to pressure Zelena into killing Regina, but she kills Hades instead, as his love for her does not hold him back from being the villain he is.

Before Robin's funeral, Emma stands at Hook's grave and cries, trying to cope with the fact that he is truly gone now. Suddenly, a wave of magic flies through the air, causing her to stumble. She hears her name called from behind her and turns around and is shocked to see Hook. She happily embraces Hook, who tells her Zeus sent him back as a reward for stopping Hades. After informing him that Robin is gone, Emma decides to break the news about Hook's return to Regina as delicately as possible. However, when an earthquake occurs, Hook rushes to see if Emma is okay. It turns out the earthquake was caused by Mr. Gold tethering magic to the Olympian Crystal fragment. Emma works with Regina to find it, only to later have Gold explain that Henry used his Author power to steal the crystal to destroy magic (again). Both follow Henry to New York, where it turns out Gold got the crystal back. At the same time, Hook, David, Snow and Zelena are accidentally sucked into another realm, which they could become trapped in without any magic in the Real World. Henry succeeds in destroying magic, only to be later convinced by the Dragon to get enough belief to recharge the crystal. It works and everyone is brought home. Once back in Storybrooke, Emma shares a passionate kiss with Hook.

=== Season 6 ===
In the past, Aladdin, a "Savior", is taunted by Jafar over the inevitable downfall of all Saviors. In Storybrooke, refugees arrive from the Land of Untold Stories. Emma experiences tremors and visions; an arrested Hyde helps her receive an oracle's vision of a hooded figure killing her. Guided by Morpheus, Gold enters Belle's dreams to lift the sleeping curse; he tries to renew their love, but she rejects him. "Morpheus" reveals he is really their unborn son and desired this outcome. Emma’s death visions trouble her, as it puts her future with Killian in doubt, and after seeing him entertain Ashley’s daughter, asks him to move in with her.

Emma discovers the sword can kill the Evil Queen without hurting Regina. The Queen steals the lamp and wishes Emma to an alternate reality where she was never the Savior; Regina follows her. In the "wish realm", Emma lives as a princess until Regina traumatically restores her memory. Regina frees Rumplestiltskin in exchange for a magic bean, but the portal to Storybrooke closes while Regina is distracted by the appearance of Robin Hood.

In 1990 Minnesota, a young Emma is told by a teenager that she has the power to change her fate. In the present day, after they miss their way out of the Wish realm, Emma and Regina find another option for escape when they come across August, who agrees to help create a new portal. Emma discovers that August was the teenager she met back in Minnesota and inspires him to complete the portal. Emma, Regina, and Robin return to Storybrooke, where Gideon explains to Gold and Belle his intention to kill Emma so that he can acquire her savior powers and kill the Black Fairy, a move that has David furious and Belle concerned. Emma and Gideon finally meet for the battle, but Emma survives, choosing her own fate. Gideon retreats, proclaiming this far from over. Gold and Belle decide to work together for the good of their son.

In the past, Snow makes a wish that grants the entire Enchanted Forest to use the gift of Song to defeat Regina, which also spreads to Oz as well. When Regina also becomes affected by the wish she finds a way to end it before the first curse takes place, but the Blue Fairy, who granted Snow the wish, tells Snow and David that the wish will be part of Emma's destiny. In Emma's past, her chance to make use of her talent is held back by being told she'll be alone. This would come back to taunt Emma in the present day, as Fiona returns to use that weakness to take Emma's heart before she unleashes a new curse on her wedding, with unlikely help from Gold by freezing her family. When Henry discovers the page in the book that reveals Emma's heart will make her stronger, not only does it embolden Emma, it stopped Fiona from crushing it, but Fiona still tells her the battle is still on. On the wedding day, Emma and Hook finally marry just in time for the dark clouds to release a new curse that sets up the final battle.

Fiona's curse wipes Emma's memory past the final episode of season 1, and places her in a mental institution, where she (and the rest of the town) believes that Henry is Fiona's rightfully adopted son and all the fairytale stories were untrue. Henry, after several instances, tries to get her to believe the truth, but she rebuffs him and moves back to Boston. Meanwhile, the rest of the characters are trapped in the Enchanted Forest as it and all the other realms crumble as a consequence of Emma's refusal to believe. However, Emma, inspired by a book Henry had created detailing her journey, returns to Storybrooke and chooses to believe him. Rumple successfully kills Fiona, which restores Emma's memory and transports the other characters back to Storybrooke. Emma fights Gideon, still under Fiona's lasting control, but ultimately chooses to sacrifice herself. Henry brings her back with True Love's Kiss and Gideon turns back into a baby, allowing Rumple and Belle a second chance.

Emma and Regina are shown to drop Henry off at his bus stop, and Emma later makes Hook deputy sheriff. All the characters are later gathered at Granny's for dinner as the camera zooms out, with the words "And they all lived happily ever after." printed on the Once Upon a Time novel, as a new story begins in the future for an adult Henry and his daughter Lucy in Seattle.

=== Season 7 ===
Sometime after, Emma is shown to share her concerns with Hook about Henry growing up while contemplating having another child. Later, Henry chooses to go to other realms in search of his story and meets another version of Cinderella, whom he falls in love with. At that time, Emma becomes pregnant with her second child and goes to answer Henry's distress call along with Killian and Regina, with the former insisting she rests. Wish Hook, however, shows up and knocks out Hook, taking his place in hopes of traveling to Storybrooke with Emma and finding a cure for his poisoned heart. Hook manages to recover and fights Wish Hook, until the latter accidentally stabs himself with a dagger. As he lies dying, he admits to having a daughter and that he was searching for her. However, Emma manages to heal him and convinces him to travel with Henry in search of both their happy endings. She later leaves with her husband back to Storybrooke.

Concurrent to a graduation trip that she and Regina take Henry on prior to the latter's departure, the older Henry and the other heroes manage to foil a plot by Wish Rumple to wreak havoc on all the realms, and end up bringing them all to Storybrooke. Once they are brought back to the present, Emma gives birth to a baby girl named Hope and, along with Hook, attends Regina's coronation where she is crowned "The Good Queen" of all the realms.

== Reception ==
"[Emma]'s pursuit of a 'happy ending' is not about finding a man or going to a ball all gussied up, but about detective work, about building a relationship with her son Henry, and about seeking the 'truth' as to why time stands still in the corrupt Storybrooke world."
—Natalie Wilson from Ms. reviewing Emma Swan.

Jennifer Morrison has received praise for her portrayal of Emma. In a review from the St. Louis Post-Dispatch, TV critic Gail Pennington had high marks for Morrison. Mary McNamara of the Los Angeles Times gave excellent reviews for Morrison's character: "Her Emma is predictably cynical and prickly – fairy-tale princess, my Aunt Fanny – but she's sharp and lively enough to keep audiences begging for 'just a few more pages' before they go to bed." For TVLive, "Morrison does a nice job of mirroring the viewer's disbelief of this fantastical dilemma – and Emma looks like she could become a worthy adversary for Regina." For Daniel Fienberg, "Jennifer Morrison is very good in the lead". On less favorable reviews, Matthew Gilbert of The Boston Globe was not enthusiastic of Morrison's portrayal and called her a "wooden lead".

Several feminist outlets were pleased with the show for its feminist twist on fairy tales and with Emma being a strong female protagonist. Genie Leslie at Feministing commented that Emma was a "badass", that she liked how Emma was "very adamant that women be able to make their own decisions about their lives and their children", and how Emma was a "well-rounded" character who was "feminine, but not 'girly'." Natalie Wilson from Ms. praised the show for a strong, "kick-butt" female lead, and for dealing with the idea of what makes a mother in a more nuanced fashion.
