= Folktales from Japan =

Japanese television series

- Poster

ふるさと再生 日本の昔話 ふるさとめぐり 日本の昔話 (Furusato Saisei: Nippon no Mukashi Banashi Furusato Meguri: Nippon no Mukashi Banashi)
- Genre: Drama, comedy, anthology series, folktale
- Anime television series
- Directed by: Takuo Suzuki
- Produced by: Ken Fujita
- Written by: various
- Studio: Tomason
- Original network: TV Tokyo
- Original run: April 1, 2012 – March 26, 2017 (first series) – April 2, 2017 – March 25, 2018 (second series)
- Episodes: 258 (first series, 700 individual segments, excl. repeats); 50 (second series, 100 individual segments)

Hometown Rebuilding: Folktales from Japan (ふるさと再生(さいせい) 日本(にっぽん)の昔(むかし)ばなし, Furusato Saisei: Nippon no Mukashi Banashi) is a 258-episode long Japanese anime television series that adapts various traditional stories from Japan. Each episode of this anime comprises three approximately seven-minute tales. Produced by the Tokyo-based animation company Tomason, it was aired by TV Tokyo from April 1, 2012, to March 26, 2017.

The narration and all character voices are provided by veteran film actors Akira Emoto and Yoneko Matsukane. Voice actress and singer Shoko Nakagawa performed the initial opening and ending theme songs. Tomoyuki Okura, a member of the vocal group INSPi, wrote and composed the opening theme "Hitori no Kimi ga Umareta to sa" (You Were Born Alone), and the ending theme song "Arukou" (Let's Walk) with his fellow INSPi member Keisuke Yoshida. From episode 53 onwards, "Arukou" was replaced by "Pyon Pyon Punyo Punyo no Uta" (Song of Jump! Jump! Cheek! Cheek!) by Shindo Heart (lyrics) and Star Flower (song) from Victor Entertainment. From episode 208 onwards, "Hitori no Kimi ga Umareta to sa" was replaced by "Furusato Hokkorimura" by Hajime Yamanouchi (lyrics) and Kaori Mizumori (song).

A second 50-episode long series, Hometown Visiting: Folktales from Japan (ふるさとめぐり日本(にっぽん)の昔(むかし)ばなし, Furusato Meguri: Nippon no Mukashi Banashi) began airing from April 2, 2017, and it was concluded on March 25, 2018. Each episode of this anime comprises two approximately ten-minute tales instead.

An English-subtitled version was simulcast on the streaming service Crunchyroll, which describes the main plot as follows: "Like in any culture, Japanese kids grow up listening to the stories repeatedly told by their parents and grandparents. The boy born from a peach; the princess from the moon who is discovered inside a bamboo; the old man who can make a dead cherry tree blossom, etc. These short stories that teach kids to see both the dark and bright sides of life have passed traditional moral values from generation to generation."

== Hometown Rebuilding: Folktales from Japan episode list ==
Many tales do have different versions as indicated between parenthesis.

| No. | Title | Original release date |
|---|---|---|
| 1 | "The Old Man Who Made the Dead Trees Blossom (1)"; Transliteration: "Hanasaka jīsan" (Japanese: 花さか爺さん) | April 1, 2012 |
| 1 | "The Man Who Bought a Dream (1)"; Transliteration: "Yume wo katta otoko" (Japanese: 夢を買った男) | April 1, 2012 |
| 1 | "The Rat Sutra (1)"; Transliteration: "Nezumi kyō" (Japanese: ねずみ経) | April 1, 2012 |
A dog rewards a kind master, a man buys a dream, and an old woman's gift is repaid.
| 2 | "Little One Inch (1)"; Transliteration: "Issun-bōshi" (Japanese: 一寸法師) | April 8, 2012 |
| 2 | "The Rolling Rice Ball (1)"; Transliteration: "Omusubi kororin" (Japanese: おむすびころりん) | April 8, 2012 |
| 2 | "The Cow's Marriage (1)"; Transliteration: "Ushi no yomeiri" (Japanese: 牛の嫁入り) | April 8, 2012 |
A small [child] shows the biggest bravery, an old man's accidental gift is repaid, and a lazy man gets the cow.
| 3 | "The Old Man and His Bump (1)"; Transliteration: "Kobutori jīsan" (Japanese: こぶとり爺さん) | April 15, 2012 |
| 3 | "The Transforming Hood (1)"; Transliteration: "Yatsubake zukin" (Japanese: 八つ化け頭巾) | April 15, 2012 |
| 3 | "The Love Potion"; Transliteration: "Hore gusuri" (Japanese: ほれ薬) | April 15, 2012 |
An old man with a bump dances for a demon band, a fox gets tricked, and a love potion backfires horribly.
| 4 | "Strong Tarō (1)"; Transliteration: "Chikaratarō" (Japanese: 力太郎) | April 22, 2012 |
| 4 | "The Village of the Nightingales (1)"; Transliteration: "Uguisu no sato" (Japanese: うぐいすの里) | April 22, 2012 |
| 4 | "Hirabayashi"; Transliteration: "Hirabayashi" (Japanese: 平林) | April 22, 2012 |
A couple creates a child from dirt, a woodcutter breaks his promise, and in the last tale we learn the meaning of "Hirarin, Heirin, Tairarin, Tairabayashi and Ippachijuu no Mokumoku, and Hitotsutoyattsudetokkikki".
| 5 | "Urashima Tarō (1)"; Transliteration: "Urashimatarō" (Japanese: 浦島太郎) | April 29, 2012 |
| 5 | "The Monkey Buddha (1)"; Transliteration: "Saru jizō" (Japanese: 猿地蔵) | April 29, 2012 |
| 5 | "Comparing Treasures"; Transliteration: "Takara kurabe" (Japanese: 宝くらべ) | April 29, 2012 |
A fisherman is given a gift that turns about to be a curse, monkeys worship a Buddha without getting their butts wet, and a merchant learns what is important in life.
| 6 | "Kintarō (1)"; Transliteration: "Kintarō" (Japanese: 金太郎) | May 6, 2012 |
| 6 | "The Squid and the Dried Squid"; Transliteration: "Ika to surume" (Japanese: いかとするめ) | May 6, 2012 |
| 6 | "Three People Crying"; Transliteration: "Sannin naki" (Japanese: 三人泣き) | May 6, 2012 |
We learn the tale of Sakata no Kintoki, a lord learns more than expected, and sometimes you have to cry to move on.
| 7 | "The Fish Wife (1)"; Transliteration: "Uo Nyōbō" (Japanese: 魚女房) | May 13, 2012 |
| 7 | "The Pond Snail Rich Man (1)"; Transliteration: "Tanishi chōja" (Japanese: たにし長者) | May 13, 2012 |
| 7 | "The Lying Girl"; Transliteration: "Horafuki musume" (Japanese: ほら吹き娘) | May 13, 2012 |
A fisherman learns to appreciate what he has, a couple is blessed with an unusual child, and a lying boy meets a lying girl.
| 8 | "The Carpenter and Oniroku (1)"; Transliteration: "Daiku to Oniroku" (Japanese: 大工と鬼六) | May 20, 2012 |
| 8 | "The Bear and the Fox"; Transliteration: "Kuma to kitsune" (Japanese: 熊と狐) | May 20, 2012 |
| 8 | "The Priest and the Child Cross the River"; Transliteration: "Oshō to kozō no kawawatari" (Japanese: 和尚と小僧の川渡り) | May 20, 2012 |
A demon puts a carpenter in an unwanted deal, a fox learns of karma, and what is more important - honesty or obedience.
| 9 | "Shippeitaro (1)"; Transliteration: "Shippeitarō" (Japanese: しっぺい太郎) | May 27, 2012 |
| 9 | "The Son Who Went Up to Heaven"; Transliteration: "Ten ni nobotta musuko" (Japanese: 天にのぼった息子) | May 27, 2012 |
| 9 | "Who's The Laziest?"; Transliteration: "Bushō kurabe" (Japanese: 無精くらべ) | May 27, 2012 |
A priest saves a town from sacrificing another daughter, a lazy man learns hard work, and a lazier man learns nothing.
| 10 | "Sannen Netarō (1)"; Transliteration: "Sannen Netarō" (Japanese: 三年寝太郎) | June 3, 2012 |
| 10 | "The Last Lie"; Transliteration: "Saigo no uso" (Japanese: 最後の嘘) | June 3, 2012 |
| 10 | "Happy, Splendid, Wonderful!"; Transliteration: "Ureshi, medetaya, arigataya" (Japanese: うれし、めでたや、ありがたや) | June 3, 2012 |
A good for nothing saves the day, a liar gets the last laugh, and we learn the importance of names.
| 11 | "The Wife Who Wouldn't Eat (1)"; Transliteration: "Kuwazu nyōbō" (Japanese: 食わず女房) | June 10, 2012 |
| 11 | "The Snot-Nosed Boy (1)"; Transliteration: "Hanatare kozō" (Japanese: 鼻たれ小僧) | June 10, 2012 |
| 11 | "The Priest and the Boy Who Had to Pee!"; Transliteration: "Oshō to kozō no kami ga nai" (Japanese: 和尚と小僧のかみがない) | June 10, 2012 |
A man learns to look beyond the surface of a person, a flower seller forgets to keep his promise, and everything is sacred.
| 12 | "The Furuya Forest (1)"; Transliteration: "Furuya no mori" (Japanese: ふるやのもり) | June 17, 2012 |
| 12 | "The Traveler's Horse"; Transliteration: "Tabibito uma" (Japanese: 旅人馬) | June 17, 2012 |
| 12 | "A Crow in the Dark of Night"; Transliteration: "Yamiyo ni karasu" (Japanese: 闇夜にカラス) | June 17, 2012 |
A thief is scary, a wolf is scary, but the worst is the Furuya Flora; two children fight a witch, and a painter learns a lesson.
| 13 | "The Teapot Raccoon Dog (1)"; Transliteration: "Bunbuku chagama" (Japanese: ぶんぶく茶釜) | June 24, 2012 |
| 13 | "The Razor Fox"; Transliteration: "Kamisori kitsune" (Japanese: 髪そり狐) | June 24, 2012 |
| 13 | "Careless Sokurō (1)"; Transliteration: "Sosō no Sōkurō" (Japanese: そそうの相九郎) | June 24, 2012 |
A raccoon repays a debt but learns a lesson, a fox thinks five steps ahead, and Mr. Careless needs to slow down.
| 14 | "Orihime and Hikoboshi (1)"; Transliteration: "Orihime to Hikoboshi" (Japanese: 織姫と彦星) | July 1, 2012 |
| 14 | "The Old Woman's Skin"; Transliteration: "Onba no kawa" (Japanese: オンバの皮) | July 1, 2012 |
| 14 | "Potato Rolling (1)"; Transliteration: "Imo korogashi" (Japanese: いもころがし) | July 1, 2012 |
The origin of the Tanabata festival is told, a snake causes a calamity, and manners are important.
| 15 | "The Fire Man (1)"; Transliteration: "Hiotoko (Note: The reading in the episode is hiotoko (ひおとこ), but this is an onomastic tale from Iwate explaining the origins of the hyottoko mask.)" (Japanese: 火男) | July 8, 2012 |
| 15 | "Rat Sumo (1)"; Transliteration: "Nezumi no sumō" (Japanese: ねずみのすもう) | July 8, 2012 |
| 15 | "The Priest and the Kid's Pupupatapata"; Transliteration: "Oshō to kozō no pūpūpatapata" (Japanese: 和尚と小僧のぷーぷーぱたぱた) | July 8, 2012 |
A man is repaid for an accidental gift but greed ruins all, an old couple sponsors a rat, and two kids trick a sneaky priest.
| 16 | "Straw Millionaire (1)"; Transliteration: "Warashibe chōja" (Japanese: わらしべ長者) | July 15, 2012 |
| 16 | "The God of the Bathroom"; Transliteration: "Kawaya no kami-sama" (Japanese: 厠の神様) | July 15, 2012 |
| 16 | "Niō and Dokkoi (1)"; Transliteration: "Niō to Dokkoi" (Japanese: 仁王とどっこい) | July 15, 2012 |
An unlucky man goes west, a god of luck gets a bum rap, and Japan challenges China in a strong man contest.
| 17 | "The Winged Robe of Heaven (1)"; Transliteration: "Ama no hagoromo" (Japanese: 天の羽衣) | July 22, 2012 |
| 17 | "The Child that was Kidnapped by an Eagle (1)"; Transliteration: "Washi no sarai ko" (Japanese: 鷲のさらい子) | July 22, 2012 |
| 17 | "The Konnyaku Interrogation"; Transliteration: "Konnyaku mondō" (Japanese: こんにゃく問答) | July 22, 2012 |
A lie does not build a family, a mother never stops searching, and a traveling priest searches for the answer.
| 18 | "The Painted Wife (1)"; Transliteration: "E-sugata nyōbō" (Japanese: 絵姿女房) | July 29, 2012 |
| 18 | "Left Behind (1)"; Transliteration: "Oitekebori" (Japanese: おいてけ堀) | July 29, 2012 |
| 18 | "If You Pick Up Money"; Transliteration: "Kane wo hirottara" (Japanese: 金をひろったら) | July 29, 2012 |
A man fights for his wife, a haunt ditch, and more money more problems.
| 19 | "Ubasute Mountain"; Transliteration: "Ubasuteyama" (Japanese: うばすて山) | August 5, 2012 |
| 19 | "The Letterbearer of the Water God"; Transliteration: "Mizu no kami no fumi zukai" (Japanese: 水の神の文使い) | August 5, 2012 |
| 19 | "The Lucky Samurai"; Transliteration: "Un no yoi niwaka zamurai" (Japanese: 運のよいにわか侍) | August 5, 2012 |
An old is thrown away, a man delivers a letter for a water god, and a fake samurai gets lucky.
| 20 | "Princess Kaguya (1)"; Transliteration: "Kaguya-hime" (Japanese: かぐや姫) | August 12, 2012 |
| 20 | "The Demonic Little Sister"; Transliteration: "Oni no imōto" (Japanese: 鬼の妹) | August 12, 2012 |
| 20 | "Scary Meat Buns (1)"; Transliteration: "Manjū kowai" (Japanese: まんじゅうこわい) | August 12, 2012 |
An elderly couple is blessed with a daughter born from a bamboo stalk, a little boy's sister has become a real demon, and a worker is terrified of meat buns.
| 21 | "Umisachihiko and Yamasachihiko (1)"; Transliteration: "Umisachihiko to Yamasachihiko" (Japanese: 海幸彦と山幸彦) | August 19, 2012 |
| 21 | "The Day the Kappa Came"; Transliteration: "Kappa ga detekita hi" (Japanese: 河童が出てきた日) | August 19, 2012 |
| 21 | "King Enma Screws Up"; Transliteration: "Enma-sama no shippai" (Japanese: 閻魔さまの失敗) | August 19, 2012 |
Two brothers exchange jobs, a kappa waits 14 years, and three souls get a second chance.
| 22 | "The Three Axes"; Transliteration: "Mittsu no ono" (Japanese: 三つの斧) | August 26, 2012 |
| 22 | "The Monkey's Groom (1)"; Transliteration: "Saru no mukodono" (Japanese: 猿の婿どの) | August 26, 2012 |
| 22 | "The Tengu and the Thief"; Transliteration: "Tengu to nusutto" (Japanese: 天狗と盗人) | August 26, 2012 |
Did you drop the gold axe or the silver axe? A man makes a deal with a monster, and a Tengu is tricked.
| 23 | "The Farting Wife"; Transliteration: "He-hiri yome" (Japanese: 屁ひり嫁) | September 2, 2012 |
| 23 | "The Cat and the Teapot Lid"; Transliteration: "Neko to chagama no futa" (Japanese: 猫と茶釜の蓋) | September 2, 2012 |
| 23 | "Chakurikakifu"; Transliteration: "Chakurikakifu" (Japanese: ちゃくりかきふ) | September 2, 2012 |
A new bride is explosive, a hunter gets lucky, and a man tries a new strategy to sell his wares.
| 24 | "The Mouse Takes a Groom (1)"; Transliteration: "Nezumi no mukodono" (Japanese: ねずみの婿取り) | September 9, 2012 |
| 24 | "The Pebble Letter"; Transliteration: "Koishi no tegami" (Japanese: 小石の手紙) | September 9, 2012 |
| 24 | "The Silence Contest (1)"; Transliteration: "Danmari kurabe" (Japanese: だんまりくらべ) | September 9, 2012 |
Mother and Father Mouse hunt for the best husband, a wife and husband communicate without words, and a couple battles for the last rice ball.
| 25 | "The Listening Hood"; Transliteration: "Kikimimi zukin" (Japanese: きき耳ずきん) | September 16, 2012 |
| 25 | "The Dog and Cat's Treasure"; Transliteration: "Inu to neko no takaramono" (Japanese: 犬と猫の宝物) | September 16, 2012 |
| 25 | "The Ghost's Poem Reading"; Transliteration: "Yūrei no utayomi" (Japanese: 幽霊の歌よみ) | September 16, 2012 |
A man listens to the world around him, a dog and cat rescue their master, and a ghost is lost in rhyme.
| 26 | "Tanokyuu (1)"; Transliteration: "Tanokyū" (Japanese: たのきゅう) | September 23, 2012 |
| 26 | "Tee-tee the Little Monk"; Transliteration: "Tētē kobōshi" (Japanese: てえてえ小法師) | September 23, 2012 |
| 26 | "The Fake Jizo Statue"; Transliteration: "Nise jizō" (Japanese: にせ地蔵) | September 23, 2012 |
Tanokyuu tricks a snake and gets a reward, monsters pick a fight with the wrong monk, and a monk and raccoon do battle.
| 27 | "[Masterpiece Selection] Orihime and Hikoboshi"; Transliteration: "[Kessakusen] Orihime to Hikoboshi (1)" (Japanese: 【傑作選】織姫と彦星) | September 30, 2012 |
| 27 | "[Masterpiece Selection] The Village of the Nightingales"; Transliteration: "[Kessakusen] Uguisu no sato" (Japanese: 【傑作選】うぐいすの里) | September 30, 2012 |
| 27 | "[Masterpiece Selection] The Monkey Buddha (1)"; Transliteration: "[Kessakusen] Saru jizō" (Japanese: 【傑作選】猿地蔵) | September 30, 2012 |
The origin of the Tanabata festival is told (repeat from episode 14), a woodcutter breaks his promise (repeat from episode 4), and monkeys worship a Buddha without getting their butts wet (repeat from episode 5).
| 28 | "The Tengu's Hidden Cloak (1)"; Transliteration: "Tengu no kakuremino" (Japanese: 天狗の隠れみの) | October 7, 2012 |
| 28 | "Grannie Demon Is My Matchmaker"; Transliteration: "Onibaba-san ga nakōdo" (Japanese: 鬼婆さんが仲人) | October 7, 2012 |
| 28 | "King Enma is Hachigoro-don (1)"; Transliteration: "Enma-sama wa hachigorō-don" (Japanese: 閻魔さまはハチゴロどん) | October 7, 2012 |
Invisibility comes with a price, a demon repays a kindness, and always carries some Yaki-Gobou when you die.
| 29 | "The Horse Mountain Woman"; Transliteration: "Umakata yamanba" (Japanese: 馬方山姥) | October 14, 2012 |
| 29 | "The Shrimp Goes to Ise"; Transliteration: "Ebi no oisemairi" (Japanese: えびのお伊勢参り) | October 14, 2012 |
| 29 | "What Sickness?"; Transliteration: "Nan no yamai" (Japanese: なんの病) | October 14, 2012 |
A mountain woman overeats, there is always someone bigger, and a man shouldn't eat.
| 30 | "The Cat Wife"; Transliteration: "Neko nyōbō" (Japanese: 猫女房) | October 21, 2012 |
| 30 | "The Gonzo Bug (1)"; Transliteration: "Gonzō mushi" (Japanese: ごんぞう虫) | October 21, 2012 |
| 30 | "The Long-Nose Fan"; Transliteration: "Hanataka ōgi" (Japanese: 鼻高扇) | October 21, 2012 |
A cat wants to replay her master, a greedy man trips to much, and a lazy man fans too much.
| 31 | "The Mountain Pear Hunter"; Transliteration: "Yama nashi tori" (Japanese: 山梨とり) | October 28, 2012 |
| 31 | "The Old woman in the Isolated House"; Transliteration: "Ikken yan no baasan" (Japanese: 一軒家の婆さん) | October 28, 2012 |
| 31 | "The Centipede gets the Doctor"; Transliteration: "Mukade no ishamukae" (Japanese: ムカデの医者むかえ) | October 28, 2012 |
Rustle Rustle Don't Go, a bully gets his, and a walking stick breaks a bone.
| 32 | "The Rich Charcoal Maker"; Transliteration: "Sumiyaki chōja" (Japanese: 炭焼き長者) | November 4, 2012 |
| 32 | "The Tree That Grows Gold"; Transliteration: "Kane no naru ki" (Japanese: 金のなる木) | November 4, 2012 |
| 32 | "The Priest's Towel"; Transliteration: "Obōsan no temegui" (Japanese: お坊さんの手めぐい) | November 4, 2012 |
Money gets up and walks away, everybody farts, and true kindness is always repaid.
| 33 | "Straw Bale Touta"; Transliteration: "Tawara no tōda" (Japanese: たわらの藤太) | November 11, 2012 |
| 33 | "The Fox Gives Birth (1)"; Transliteration: "Kitsune no O-san" (Japanese: 狐のお産) | November 11, 2012 |
| 33 | "Cling And Hold"; Transliteration: "Tottsuku hittsuku" (Japanese: 取っつく引っつく) | November 11, 2012 |
The fearsome warrior Fujiwara Touta Hidesato fears nothing, a village doctor changes his way, and... Please! Cling! Please! Hold!
| 34 | "The Three Brothers"; Transliteration: "Sannin no kyōdai" (Japanese: 三人の兄弟) | November 18, 2012 |
| 34 | "The Wolf's Eyebrows"; Transliteration: "Ōkami no mayuge" (Japanese: 狼の眉毛) | November 18, 2012 |
| 34 | "Dokkoisho"; Transliteration: "Dokkoisho" (Japanese: どっこいしょ) | November 18, 2012 |
Three brothers learn the best use of money, wolves won't eat a good man, and dokkosiho is delicious!
| 35 | "The Treasure Gourd"; Transliteration: "Takara hyōtan" (Japanese: 宝ひょうたん) | November 25, 2012 |
| 35 | "The White Rabbit of Inaba (1)"; Transliteration: "Inaba no shiro-usagi" (Japanese: 因幡の白兎) | November 25, 2012 |
| 35 | "The Bald Wife"; Transliteration: "Yome no bōzu-atama" (Japanese: 嫁の坊主頭) | November 25, 2012 |
A thief gets tricked, a rabbit plays tricks, and a brother's revenge for a trick goes too far.
| 36 | "The Crane Repays a Debt (1)"; Transliteration: "Tsuru no Ongaeshi" (Japanese: 鶴の恩返し) | December 2, 2012 |
| 36 | "Slaying the Demon of Ōeyama"; Transliteration: "Ōeyama no oni-taiji" (Japanese: 大江山の鬼退治) | December 2, 2012 |
| 36 | "The Water of Youth (1)"; Transliteration: "Wakagaeri no mizu" (Japanese: 若返りの水) | December 2, 2012 |
A crane repays a fisherman, a group of heroes defeat a demon, and moderation is key.
| 37 | "The Three Talismans (1)"; Transliteration: "Sanmai no O-fuda" (Japanese: 三枚のお札) | December 9, 2012 |
| 37 | "The Kid and the Cat Picture"; Transliteration: "Kozō to neko no e" (Japanese: 小僧と猫の絵) | December 9, 2012 |
| 37 | "The God of Poverty"; Transliteration: "Binbōgami" (Japanese: 貧乏神) | December 9, 2012 |
A kid learns to trust his priest, a priest learns to believe in a child's dream, and the gods have to go.
| 38 | "The Town Mouse and the Country Mouse"; Transliteration: "Machi no nezumi to inaka no nezumi" (Japanese: 町のねずみと田舎のねずみ) | December 16, 2012 |
| 38 | "Oshira-sama (1)"; Transliteration: "Oshira-sama" (Japanese: おしらさま) | December 16, 2012 |
| 38 | "The Tortoise and the Hare"; Transliteration: "Usagi to kame" (Japanese: うさぎとカメ) | December 16, 2012 |
A country rat tries out the big city, a father learns a hard lesson, and it's tortoise vs. hare.
| 39 | "The Jizou Statue With the Hat (1)"; Transliteration: "Kasa jizō" (Japanese: 笠地蔵) | December 23, 2012 |
| 39 | "The Mortar That Made Salt (1)"; Transliteration: "Shio-fuki usu" (Japanese: 塩ふき臼) | December 23, 2012 |
| 39 | "A Guest on New Year's Eve"; Transliteration: "Ōtoshi no kyaku" (Japanese: 大年の客) | December 23, 2012 |
The gods repay a kindness, greed gets you nowhere, and a true act of kindness is always rewarded.
| 40 | "Momotarō (1)"; Transliteration: "Momotarō" (Japanese: 桃太郎) | January 1, 2013 |
| 40 | "Princess Hachikatsugi (1)"; Transliteration: "Hachikatsugi-hime" (Japanese: はちかつぎ姫) | January 1, 2013 |
| 40 | "The Story Of the Twelve Signs Of the Zodiac"; Transliteration: "Jūnishi no hanashi" (Japanese: 十二支のはなし) | January 1, 2013 |
A couple finds a baby, a young girl lives with a flowerpot on her head, and how the zodiac got its animals.
| 41 | "We Stopped the War"; Transliteration: "Ikusa wa yameta" (Japanese: いくさはやめた) | January 3, 2013 |
| 41 | "The Giant Snake and the Hunter"; Transliteration: "Daija to karibito" (Japanese: 大蛇と狩人) | January 3, 2013 |
| 41 | "Otter's House"; Transliteration: "Shippo no tsuri" (Japanese: 尻尾の釣り) | January 3, 2013 |
A nation tricks a war hungry nation, a hunter tricks a snake, and an otter tricks a fox.
| 42 | "The Snake Boy"; Transliteration: "Hebimusuko" (Japanese: 蛇息子) | January 20, 2013 |
| 42 | "The Kappa and the Straw Shoes"; Transliteration: "Kappa to warazōri" (Japanese: カッパとわらぞうり) | January 20, 2013 |
| 42 | "The Fava Bean, Straw, and Charcoal"; Transliteration: "Soramame to wara to sumi" (Japanese: そら豆とわらと炭) | January 20, 2013 |
A couple raise a snake, a kappa gets married, and a Fava Bean, Straw, and Charcoal take a trip to Ise.
| 43 | "The Wind God and the Children (1)"; Transliteration: "Kaze no kami to kodomo-tachi" (Japanese: 風の神と子供たち) | January 27, 2013 |
| 43 | "The Lacquer Brothers"; Transliteration: "Urushi no kyōdai" (Japanese: 漆の兄弟) | January 27, 2013 |
| 43 | "The Amanojaku and the Child"; Transliteration: "Amanojaku to warashi" (Japanese: 天の邪鬼とわらし) | January 27, 2013 |
Children learn how to seasons come in, a brother's greed leads to ruin, and the Amanojaku gets tricked.
| 44 | "Blessings of Heaven and Earth (1)"; Transliteration: "Tenpuku chifuku" (Japanese: 天福地福) | February 3, 2013 |
| 44 | "The Leaf Hachibei"; Transliteration: "Nameshi Hachibē" (Japanese: 菜飯八兵衛) | February 3, 2013 |
| 44 | "The Ginger Wife (1)"; Transliteration: "Myōga nyōbō" (Japanese: 茗荷女房) | February 3, 2013 |
An honest man gets rewarded by a liar, a husband white lie turns into a great whale, and a couple tries the ginger trick.
| 45 | "The Bridge Where You Buy Miso"; Transliteration: "Miso kai-bashi" (Japanese: 味噌買い橋) | February 10, 2013 |
| 45 | "The Cat Congregation"; Transliteration: "Neko danka" (Japanese: 猫檀家) | February 10, 2013 |
| 45 | "The Old Man Who Swallowed Birds"; Transliteration: "Tori-nomi jīsan" (Japanese: 鳥呑み爺さん) | February 10, 2013 |
A giving man waits by a bridge, a monk witness his cat give a moving speech, and Chichinpuyopuyo Pupuyopuyo.
| 46 | "The Hiding Snow"; Transliteration: "Atokakushi no yuki" (Japanese: あとかくしの雪) | February 17, 2013 |
| 46 | "The Three Riddles"; Transliteration: "Mittsu no nazokake" (Japanese: 三つの謎かけ) | February 17, 2013 |
| 46 | "The Deep Voice"; Transliteration: "Kōtta koe" (Japanese: こおった声) | February 17, 2013 |
Is it a gift from Buddha or is it stealing? The answers you sneak can come in many forms and give your friend the benefit of the doubt.
| 47 | "The Farting Priest"; Transliteration: "Shiri nari bera" (Japanese: 尻鳴りべら) | February 24, 2013 |
| 47 | "The Demon Mask That Wept"; Transliteration: "Namida wo nagashita oni no men" (Japanese: 涙を流した鬼の面) | February 24, 2013 |
| 47 | "Starfire (1)"; Transliteration: "Hoshi no hi" (Japanese: 星の火) | February 24, 2013 |
A priest gains the power to control farts, a mother-in-law's true colors are shown, and brothers want to cook with a star.
| 48 | "The Seven Swans"; Transliteration: "Nanawa no hakuchō" (Japanese: 七羽の白鳥) | March 3, 2013 |
| 48 | "The Mysterious Love Poem"; Transliteration: "Nazo no koiuta" (Japanese: 謎の恋歌) | March 3, 2013 |
| 48 | "'O' is hard" Transliteration: "'O' wa muzukashī desu" (Japanese: 「お」は難しいです) | March 3, 2013 |
A sister saves her brothers; a love is found, lost, and found again; and you put an "o" in front of everything to be polite.
| 49 | "The Cry That Split the Night"; Transliteration: "Yami wo sake otakebi" (Japanese: 闇を裂く雄叫び) | March 10, 2013 |
| 49 | "Octopuses Don't Have Bones"; Transliteration: "Tako hone nashi" (Japanese: タコほねなし) | March 10, 2013 |
| 49 | "The Former Dog (1)"; Transliteration: "Moto inu" (Japanese: 元犬) | March 10, 2013 |
A dog is loyal no matter what, the Queens wants monkey livers, and a dog wishes to be human.
| 50 | "The Thousand League Sandals"; Transliteration: "Hito ashi senri no waraji" (Japanese: 一足千里のわらじ) | March 17, 2013 |
| 50 | "The Mountain Priest and the White Wolf"; Transliteration: "Yamabushi to shiroi ōkami" (Japanese: 山伏と白い狼) | March 17, 2013 |
| 50 | "The Days Pass So Fast (1)"; Transliteration: "Tsukihi no tatsu no wa hayai" (Japanese: 月日のたつのは早い) | March 17, 2013 |
Three brothers run from a demon, a priest spends a night in a tree, and the Sun, Moon, and Thunder come to an agreement.
| 51 | "Yamata no Orochi (1)"; Transliteration: "Yamata no Orochi" (Japanese: ヤマタノオロチ) | March 17, 2013 |
| 51 | "The Satori Woman and the Bucket Maker"; Transliteration: "Satori onna to okeya" (Japanese: サトリ女と桶屋) | March 17, 2013 |
| 51 | "Return the smell" Transliteration: "Nioi no okaeshi" (Japanese: 匂いのお返し) | March 17, 2013 |
Susano has to prove his worth, a Satori woman finds her man, and a cheapo meets his match.
| 52 | "[Masterpiece Selection] The Rich Charkoal Maker"; Transliteration: "[Kessakusen] Sumiyaki chōja" (Japanese: 【傑作選】炭焼き長者) | March 31, 2013 |
| 52 | "[Masterpiece Selection] Grannie Demon Is My Matchmaker"; Transliteration: "[Kessakusen] Onibaba-san ga nakoudo" (Japanese: 【傑作選】鬼婆さんが仲人) | March 31, 2013 |
| 52 | "[Masterpiece Selection] What Sickness?"; Transliteration: "[Kessakusen] Nan no yamai" (Japanese: 【傑作選】なんの病) | March 31, 2013 |
Money gets up and walks away (repeat from episode 32), a demon repays a kindness (repeat from episode 28), and a man shouldn't eat (repeat from episode 29).
| 53 | "Mother's Crystal"; Transliteration: "Haha no takaradama" (Japanese: 母の宝玉) | April 7, 2013 |
| 53 | "The Rolling Rice Ball (1)"; Transliteration: "Omusubi kororin" (Japanese: おむすびころりん) | April 7, 2013 |
| 53 | "The Golden Arches"; Transliteration: "Kane no torī" (Japanese: 金の鳥居) | April 7, 2013 |
A mother provers her love, and old man's accidental gift is repaid (repeat from episode 2), and a man gets greedy with his prayers.
| 54 | "Bat"; Transliteration: "Kōmori" (Japanese: こうもり) | April 14, 2013 |
| 54 | "The Old Man and His Bump (1)"; Transliteration: "Kobutori jīsan" (Japanese: こぶとり爺さん) | April 14, 2013 |
| 54 | "Lunch works" Transliteration: "Bentō ga hataraku" (Japanese: 弁当が働く) | April 14, 2013 |
The bat flies at dusk, an old man with a bump dances for a demon band (repeat from episode 3), and lunch works.
| 55 | "Snake and Fox Repay a Debt"; Transliteration: "Hebi to kitsune no ongaeshi" (Japanese: ヘビと狐の恩返し) | April 21, 2013 |
| 55 | "The Old Man Who Made the Dead Trees Blossom (1)"; Transliteration: "Hanasaka jīsan" (Japanese: 花さか爺さん) | April 21, 2013 |
| 55 | "The Pheasant and the Crow"; Transliteration: "Kiji to karosu" (Japanese: キジとカラス) | April 21, 2013 |
A good deed is repaid, a dog rewards a kind master (repeat from episode 1), and a bumpkin gets the last laugh.
| 56 | "Tears Overflow"; Transliteration: "Namida ga koboeru" (Japanese: 涙がこぼれる) | April 28, 2013 |
| 56 | "Strong Tarō (1)"; Transliteration: "Chikaratarō" (Japanese: 力太郎) | April 28, 2013 |
| 56 | "The Skylark and the Water of Youth"; Transliteration: "Hibari to wakamizu" (Japanese: ひばりと若水) | April 28, 2013 |
A man learns about the importance of community, a couple creates a child from dirt (repeat from episode 4), and a skylark ruins everything.
| 57 | "The Mother and Daughter Slay a Demon"; Transliteration: "Haha to musume no oni-taiji" (Japanese: 母と娘の鬼退治) | May 5, 2013 |
| 57 | "Kintarō (1)"; Transliteration: "Kintarō" (Japanese: 金太郎) | May 5, 2013 |
| 57 | "The Farting Girl"; Transliteration: "He kaburi musume" (Japanese: 屁かぶり娘) | May 5, 2013 |
A mother fights for her daughter, we learn the tale of Sakata no Kintoki (repeat from episode 6), and toot causes great embarrassment.
| 58 | "The Radish Samurai"; Transliteration: "Daikon no musha" (Japanese: 大根の武者) | May 12, 2013 |
| 58 | "The Furuya Forest (1)"; Transliteration: "Furuya no mori" (Japanese: ふるやのもり) | May 12, 2013 |
| 58 | "The Golden Horse Poop"; Transliteration: "Kin no bafun" (Japanese: 金の馬糞) | May 12, 2013 |
A radish saves; a thief is scary, a wolf is scary, but the worst is the Furuya Flora (repeat from episode 12); and can a horse poop gold?
| 59 | "When the Moon's Ring Disappears"; Transliteration: "Tsukinowa no kieru toki" (Japanese: 月ノ輪の消えるとき) | May 19, 2013 |
| 59 | "The Rat Sutra (1)"; Transliteration: "Nezumi kyō" (Japanese: ねずみ経) | May 19, 2013 |
| 59 | "A Punch as a Reward"; Transliteration: "Genkotsu no hōbi" (Japanese: げんこつのほうび) | May 19, 2013 |
A young girl is thrown into the river, an old woman's gift is repaid (repeat from episode 1), and a king learns a lesson.
| 60 | "The Mermaid's Feast"; Transliteration: "Ninhyo no gochisō" (Japanese: 人魚のごちそう) | May 26, 2013 |
| 60 | "The Fox and the Bear"; Transliteration: "Kuma to kitsune" (Japanese: 熊と狐) | May 26, 2013 |
| 60 | "The Beginning of Man"; Transliteration: "Hito no hajimari" (Japanese: 人のはじまり) | May 26, 2013 |
A simple trip leads to an unfortunate life, a fox learns of karma (repeat from episode 8), and the Fire god is lonely.
| 61 | "The Red Thread"; Transliteration: "Akai ito" (Japanese: 赤い糸) | June 2, 2013 |
| 61 | "The Cow's Marriage"; Transliteration: "Ushi no yomeiri" (Japanese: 牛の嫁入り) | June 2, 2013 |
| 61 | "Beyond the Mirror"; Transliteration: "Kagami no mukō" (Japanese: 鏡のむこう) | June 2, 2013 |
A man fights fate, a lazy man gets the cow (repeat from episode 2), and a son sees his father.
| 62 | "The Carp Wife"; Transliteration: "Koi nyōbō" (Japanese: 鯉女房) | June 9, 2013 |
| 62 | "The Snot-Nosed Boy (1)"; Transliteration: "Hanatare kozō" (Japanese: 鼻たれ小僧) | June 9, 2013 |
| 62 | "The Giant Beanstalk"; Transliteration: "Mame no taiboku" (Japanese: 豆の大木) | June 9, 2013 |
A man marries a unique woman, a flower seller forgets to keep his promise (repeat from episode 11), and a farmer makes it rain.
| 63 | "The Monkey Repays a Debt"; Transliteration: "Saru no ongaeshi" (Japanese: 猿の恩返し) | June 16, 2013 |
| 63 | "Little One Inch (1)"; Transliteration: "Issun-bōshi" (Japanese: 一寸法師) | June 16, 2013 |
| 63 | "The Gourd Boy"; Transliteration: "Hyōtan musuko" (Japanese: ひょうたん息子) | June 16, 2013 |
A monkey steals a baby, a small shows the biggest bravery (repeat from episode 2), and a unique shaped baby grows into a unique man.
| 64 | "The Female Fox"; Transliteration: "Ojiyō kitsune" (Japanese: おじょう狐) | June 23, 2013 |
| 64 | "Hirabayashi"; Transliteration: "Hirabayashi" (Japanese: 平林) | June 23, 2013 |
| 64 | "The Wild Warrior and the Ox Cart"; Transliteration: "Aramusha to gyūsha" (Japanese: 荒武者と牛車) | June 23, 2013 |
A female fox; the meaning of "Hirarin, Heirin, Tairarin, Tairabayashi and Ippachijuu no Mokumoku, and Hitotsutoyattsudetokkikki" (repeat from episode 4), and a legendary hero can't catch a break.
| 65 | "The Dragonfly Rich Man"; Transliteration: "Danburi chōja" (Japanese: だんぶり長者) | June 30, 2013 |
| 65 | "The Fishwife"; Transliteration: "Uo nyōbō" (Japanese: 魚女房) | June 30, 2013 |
| 65 | "Ikkyuu-san's Funny Story"; Transliteration: "Ikkyū-san no tonchi hanashi" (Japanese: 一休さんのとんち話) | June 30, 2013 |
Dainichi Nyorai guides a family, a fisherman learns to appreciate what he has (repeat from episode 7), and a young monk learns not to judge a book by its cover.
| 66 | "Monkey Masamune"; Transliteration: "Saru Masamune" (Japanese: 猿正宗) | July 7, 2013 |
| 66 | "The Days Pass So Fast"; Transliteration: "Tsukihi no tatsu no wa hayai" (Japanese: 月日のたつのは早い) | July 7, 2013 |
| 66 | "The Woodcutter and the Mountain Grannie"; Transliteration: "Kikori to yamanba" (Japanese: きこりと山姥) | July 7, 2013 |
A runner saves a group of monkeys at an expensive cost; the Sun, Moon, and Thunder come to an agreement (repeat from episode 50), and a woodcutter gets the last laugh.
| 67 | "Minister Yuriwaka"; Transliteration: "Yuriwaka daijin" (Japanese: 百合若大臣) | July 14, 2013 |
| 67 | "The Fire Man (1)"; Transliteration: "Hyottoko" (Japanese: 火男) | July 14, 2013 |
| 67 | "The Kid and the Priest Eat Poisonous Snacks"; Transliteration: "Oshō uto kozō no mochi wa doku" (Japanese: 和尚と小僧の餅は毒) | July 14, 2013 |
A southern ruler named Yuriwaka is abandoned on an island, an old man brings home a boy named "Fire Man" (repeat from episode 15), and a stingy priest tells the children at his temple that his snacks are made of poison, but...
| 68 | "The Talking Fish"; Transliteration: "Monoiu sakana" (Japanese: ものいう魚) | July 21, 2013 |
| 68 | "Urashima Tarō (1)"; Transliteration: "Urashimatarō" (Japanese: 浦島太郎) | July 21, 2013 |
| 68 | "The Demon's Handprint"; Transliteration: "Oni no tegata" (Japanese: 鬼の手形) | July 21, 2013 |
A stranger comes to a fishing village which plans to catch many fish by poisoning the river. As the villagers debate, they are warned against this by a traveling priest; a fisherman saves a little turtle and is taken to an undersea palace (repeat from episode 5), and two boys go to ask the fire god to help them with a demon who's been raiding their village.
| 69 | "The Swallow With the Broken Leg"; Transliteration: "Ashi ore tsubame" (Japanese: 足折れ燕) | July 28, 2013 |
| 69 | "Left Behind (1)"; Transliteration: "Oitekebori" (Japanese: おいてけ堀) | July 28, 2013 |
| 69 | "The Legend of the Nine-Headed Dragon"; Transliteration: "Kuzuryū densetsu" (Japanese: 九頭竜伝説) | July 28, 2013 |
An old man saves a broken swallow, who rewards him with a magic watermelon seed; a man encounters a terrifying ghost at a haunted stream (repeat from episode 18), and a traveling priest visits a village where an evil dragon is devouring virgin sacrifices.
| 70 | "Filial Devotion In Dreams"; Transliteration: "Yume no kōshin" (Japanese: 夢の孝心) | August 4, 2013 |
| 70 | "Rat Sumo (1)"; Transliteration: "Nezumi no sumō" (Japanese: ねずみのすもう) | August 4, 2013 |
| 70 | "A Story of Stolen Melons"; Transliteration: "Uri wo nusumareta hanashi" (Japanese: 瓜を盗まれた話) | August 4, 2013 |
Two men are visited in dreams by their dead fathers, rats fight it out in the sumo ring (repeat from episode 15), and a mysterious old man makes magic with watermelons.
| 71 | "The tree in the Pot"; Transliteration: "Hachi no ki" (Japanese: 鉢の木) | August 11, 2013 |
| 71 | "Princess Kaguya (1)"; Transliteration: "Kaguya-hime" (Japanese: かぐや姫) | August 11, 2013 |
| 71 | "The monk and the Fox"; Transliteration: "Ogyōsama to kitsune" (Japanese: お行さまと狐) | August 11, 2013 |
A fallen lord sacrifices his prized possessions for a traveling monk; a princess is found in a stalk of bamboo (repeat from episode 20), and a priest tricks a fox, and finds himself confronted by the lost souls of hell.
| 72 | "Hoichi the Earless (1)"; Transliteration: "Miminashi Hōichi" (Japanese: 耳なし芳一) | August 18, 2013 |
| 72 | "Niō and Dokkoi (1)"; Transliteration: "Niō to Dokkoi" (Japanese: 仁王とどっこい) | August 18, 2013 |
| 72 | "Badger disaster" Transliteration: "Mujina no sainan" (Japanese: ムジナの災難) | August 18, 2013 |
A musician is haunted by the spirits of fallen samurai, two massive men duel for supremacy (repeat from episode 16), and a transforming badger runs a con at a mountain pass.
| 73 | "A Story of Futons"; Transliteration: "Futon no hanashi" (Japanese: ふとんの話) | August 25, 2013 |
| 73 | "Chakurikakifu"; Transliteration: "Chakurikakifu" (Japanese: ちゃくりかきふ) | August 25, 2013 |
| 73 | "The Dancing Bones"; Transliteration: "Odoru gaikotsu" (Japanese: 踊る骸骨) | August 25, 2013 |
The ghostly voices of children cry out at night from a haunted bed, a man tries a new strategy to sell his wares (repeat from episode 23), and the dancing bones of a murdered man bring fame and wealth to the one who killed him.
| 74 | "Dandarabotchi and the Giant Sandals"; Transliteration: "Dandarabotchi to ōwaraji" (Japanese: ダンダラボッチと大わらじ) | September 1, 2013 |
| 74 | "The Painted Wife (1)"; Transliteration: "E-sugata nyōbō" (Japanese: 絵姿女房) | September 1, 2013 |
| 74 | "The Fox in the Bag"; Transliteration: "Fukuro no kitsune" (Japanese: 袋のキツネ) | September 1, 2013 |
A titan lays siege to a small fishing village, an evil lord steals a man's beautiful wife (repeat from episode 18), and friends of a lord plot to take back his money from a fox haunting in a graveyard.
| 75 | "The Puppet Master"; Transliteration: "Ningyō tsukai" (Japanese: 人形使い) | September 8, 2013 |
| 75 | "The God of the Bathroom"; Transliteration: "Kawaya no kami-sama" (Japanese: 厠の神様) | September 8, 2013 |
| 75 | "The Whale and the Sea Cucumber"; Transliteration: "Kujira to namako" (Japanese: 鯨となまこ) | September 8, 2013 |
A puppet master visits a strange temple, a goddess is punished for her dalliances (repeat from episode 16) and an arrogant whale loses a race.
| 76 | "Unspeaking Okiku"; Transliteration: "Mono iwanu Okiku" (Japanese: もの言わぬお菊) | September 15, 2013 |
| 76 | "Ubasute Mountain"; Transliteration: "Ubasuteyama" (Japanese: うばすて山) | September 15, 2013 |
| 76 | "The Sumo Wrestler's Little Sister"; Transliteration: "Sumō-tori no imōto" (Japanese: 相撲取りの妹) | September 15, 2013 |
A girl sings a song, and her father is sacrificed; a son is tasked with taking his mother to the mountains, where she will left to die (repeat from episode 19), and a tense hostage situation at a sumo wrestler's dojo.
| 77 | "Monkey and Crab (1)"; Transliteration: "Saru kani" (Japanese: さるかに) | September 22, 2013 |
| 77 | "Straw Millionaire (1)"; Transliteration: "Warashibe chōja" (Japanese: わらしべ長者) | September 22, 2013 |
| 77 | "Head Lake (1)"; Transliteration: "Atama ga ike" (Japanese: 頭が池) | September 22, 2013 |
Crabs seek revenge upon a monkey for wounding their mother, and are aided by a mortar and cow poop; a divine oracle leads a man to riches (repeat from episode 16), and a man's head becomes the scene of strange happenings.
| 78 | "[First half masterpieces] The Mermaid's Feast"; Transliteration: "[Kamihanki Kessakusen] Ninhyo no gochisō" (Japanese: 人魚のごちそう) | September 29, 2013 |
| 78 | "[First half masterpieces] The Mother and Daughter Slay a Demon"; Transliteration: "[Kamihanki Kessakusen] Haha to musume no oni-taiji" (Japanese: 母と娘の鬼退治) | September 29, 2013 |
| 78 | "[First half masterpieces] The Pheasant and the Crow"; Transliteration: "[Kamihanki Kessakusen] Kiji to karosu" (Japanese: キジとカラス) | September 29, 2013 |
A simple trip leads to an unfortunate life (repeat from episode 60), a mother fights for her daughter (repeat from episode 57), and a bumpkin gets the last laugh (repeat from episode 55).
| 79 | "The Little Chestnut"; Transliteration: "Chisana tochi no mi" (Japanese: 小さな栃の実) | October 6, 2013 |
| 79 | "The Day the Kappa Came"; Transliteration: "Kappa ga detekita hi" (Japanese: 河童が出てきた日) | October 6, 2013 |
| 79 | "The Oryuu Willow (1)"; Transliteration: "Oryūyanagi" (Japanese: おりゅう柳) | October 6, 2013 |
A massive pumpkin grows from a tiny vine and a man is very happy; parents hear from the mountain god and water god that their child will be stolen by Kappas on his twelfth birthday (repeat from episode 21), and a huge willow stands in front of a tea shop. The son of the shop saves it from being cut down.
| 80 | "The Silver Temple"; Transliteration: "Hakugindō" (Japanese: 白銀堂) | October 13, 2013 |
| 80 | "The Pebble Letter"; Transliteration: "Koishi no tegami" (Japanese: 小石の手紙) | October 13, 2013 |
| 80 | "The Famous Blade Kisenbamaru"; Transliteration: "Meitō kisenbamaru" (Japanese: 名刀木千把丸) | October 13, 2013 |
Midon the fisherman is wounded and can't go fishing, so he borrows money from a samurai - but can't pay it back; a wife gets mad at her drunkard husband and returns to her parents - but she misses her husband now that she's left him (repeat from episode 24), and a young servant named Sutekichi loves katanas. He wants his own, so he pays a blacksmith with a thousand logs to make one for him.
| 81 | "The Sparrow With the Severed Tongue (1)"; Transliteration: "Shita-kiri Suzume" (Japanese: 舌切り雀) | October 20, 2013 |
| 81 | "The Horse Mountain Woman"; Transliteration: "Umakata yamanba" (Japanese: 馬方山姥) | October 20, 2013 |
| 81 | "The Dance of the Cats"; Transliteration: "Neko no odoriba" (Japanese: 猫の踊り場) | October 20, 2013 |
An old man loved a swallow, but when it eats his wife's glue, she cuts out its tongue. He goes deep into the mountains to find her... A packdriver buys a good horse in town, and then some mackerel to give to the god of horses (repeat from episode 29), and Shinkichi works at a soy sauce shop, but since he's so careless everyone treats him like a child.
| 82 | "The Ear Priest Statue (1)"; Transliteration: "Mimi jizō" (Japanese: 耳地蔵) | October 27, 2013 |
| 82 | "The Centipede Gets the Doctor"; Transliteration: "Mukade no ishamukae" (Japanese: ムカデの医者むかえ) | October 27, 2013 |
| 82 | "Benten's Swamp"; Transliteration: "Benten no numa" (Japanese: 弁天の沼) | October 27, 2013 |
A statue by the river reminds a boy of his dead mother. His stepmom tells him that if the statue will eat a rice ball, he can have one too, so off he goes. The insect children are playing in the depths of the forest when walking stick falls from a tree and starts to cry (repeat from episode 31). One late night, a pack driver is returning home when he meets a beautiful woman.
| 83 | "The Village of the Dragonflies"; Transliteration: "Kagerō no sato" (Japanese: かげろうの里) | November 3, 2013 |
| 83 | "The White Rabbit of Inaba (1)"; Transliteration: "Inaba no shiro-usagi" (Japanese: 因幡の白兎) | November 3, 2013 |
| 83 | "The Fortune Telling Competition"; Transliteration: "Uranai kurabe" (Japanese: 占いくらべ) | November 3, 2013 |
A fisherman's wife dies from illness, and he meets a woman who looks just like her on the rocks of a cape. The white rabbit who lives on the island of Inaba tries to trick the crocodiles to let him cross the sea, but they strip off his skin (repeat from episode 35), and Doujimaru is said to be the son of the white fox, and to have inherited his mother's mysterious powers.
| 84 | "The Three Masks"; Transliteration: "Mittsu no men" (Japanese: 三つの面) | November 10, 2013 |
| 84 | "The Tengu's Hidden Cloak (1)"; Transliteration: "Tengu no kakuremino" (Japanese: 天狗の隠れみの) | November 10, 2013 |
| 84 | "The Flying Door"; Transliteration: "Sora tobu toita" (Japanese: 空とぶ戸板) | November 10, 2013 |
A young servant girl is given a demon mask as a goodbye present, and goes to a new place to work. A young boy learns that if you put on a Tengu's cape you'll be invisible. He steals the cape from the Tengu, and now he can play all the tricks he wants, but... (repeat from episode 28). "We've saved this money up for the future. Don't waste it," an old husband tells his silly wife... but then, a pair of thieves come when he's not home.
| 85 | "The Old Woman and the Giant Octopus"; Transliteration: "Baachan to ōtako" (Japanese: ばあちゃんと大ダコ) | November 17, 2013 |
| 85 | "Dokkoisho"; Transliteration: "Dokkoisho" (Japanese: どっこいしょ) | November 17, 2013 |
| 85 | "The Tengu of Ashitaka Mountain"; Transliteration: "Ashitakayama no tengu" (Japanese: 愛鷹山の天狗) | November 17, 2013 |
An old woman cuts off the leg of an octopus on the beach, and gets rich by selling it at the market. A groom is given botamochi rice balls at his bride's village. He wants his mom to make them, so he keeps saying "botamochi" on the way home, but then he trips and rises up saying, "dokkoisho!" (repeat from episode 34). A strong-willed and hardworking mother goes all alone to Ashitaka Mountain, where a Tengu lives. But she doesn't come back.
| 86 | "The Mysterious Blacksmith"; Transliteration: "Nazo no katanakaji" (Japanese: 謎の刀鍛冶) | November 24, 2013 |
| 86 | "The Fox Gives Birth (1)"; Transliteration: "Kitsune no O-san" (Japanese: 狐のお産) | November 24, 2013 |
| 86 | "Senkamejo"; Transliteration: "Senkamejo" (Japanese: 千亀女) | November 24, 2013 |
"If I can make a hundred swords in a night, give me your daughter," a traveler says, and locks himself in a blacksmith's forge. There was a mean doctor who lived in a village. One night, he goes to a mansion to save a young girl who's having a hard birth (repeat from episode 33). Senkamejo grew up spoiled by her mother, and was the prettiest girl in town, but selfish and arrogant. One day she hears that a beautiful statue of Kannon-sama is at the temple, and she and her mother go to see it.
| 87 | "Kachikachi Yama (1)"; Transliteration: "Kachikachiyama" (Japanese: かちかち山) | December 1, 2013 |
| 87 | "The Three Charms (1)"; Transliteration: "Sanmai no O-fuda" (Japanese: 三枚のお札) | December 1, 2013 |
| 87 | "The Kappa and the Handwashing Basin"; Transliteration: "Kappa to tearaibonchi" (Japanese: カッパと手洗鉢) | December 1, 2013 |
A raccoon badly injures a kind old woman. The rabbit hears about this from her husband, and angrily avenges her. A child is picking up chestnuts in the forest, and before he knows it it's night. A demon grannie catches him (repeat from episode 37). A new hand washing basin has been put in the village shrine. But the kappa used this stone to sit on and think or keep watch.
| 88 | "The Ghost Well"; Transliteration: "Yūrei ido" (Japanese: 幽霊井戸) | December 8, 2013 |
| 88 | "The Man Who Bought a Dream"; Transliteration: "Yume wo katta otoko" (Japanese: 夢を買った男) | December 8, 2013 |
| 88 | "Tougorou the Potato Digger"; Transliteration: "Imohori Tōgorō" (Japanese: 芋掘り藤五郎) | December 8, 2013 |
A mysterious woman visits a candy store every night. The owner follows her after she leaves, but she disappears into a grave... A traveling merchant buys his partner's dream of treasure for a lot of money (repeat from episode 1). The beautiful daughter of a rich man is sent to marry tougorou the potato digger. Tougorou is lonely and miserable and poor in the mountains, but one day...
| 89 | "Sacrificial Inari"; Transliteration: "Migawari Inari" (Japanese: 身がわり稲荷) | December 15, 2013 |
| 89 | "The Crane Repays a Debt (1)"; Transliteration: "Tsuru no Ongaeshi" (Japanese: 鶴の恩返し) | December 15, 2013 |
| 89 | "The Monster in the Cotton Hat"; Transliteration: "Wataboushi no yōkai" (Japanese: 綿帽子の妖怪) | December 15, 2013 |
A field worker named Manzou gets a small field with a shrine from the rich man. A charcoal-maker takes pity on a crane being sold by the road, and pays money to free it (repeat from episode 36). An old man loves to fish at night at a waterfall. He gets old and decides to retire, and gives his fishing pole to a young man.
| 90 | "The Jouroku Statue"; Transliteration: "Jouroku jizō" (Japanese: 丈六地蔵) | December 22, 2013 |
| 90 | "The Gods of Poverty"; Transliteration: "Binbōgami" (Japanese: 貧乏神) | December 22, 2013 |
| 90 | "The carp in the Basin"; Transliteration: "Hachi no koi" (Japanese: 鉢の鯉) | December 22, 2013 |
A huge rock saves a village from a flood. The villagers use it to make a giant statue, but the statue is too big to carry to the temple. But then the statue... (repeat from episode 37). A poor old man goes to sell balls of thread for new years. Gorouhei, a poor man, trades an old basin from his family for rice.
| 91 | "The Gold Horse of New Year's Eve"; Transliteration: "Ōmisoka no kane uma" (Japanese: 大みそかの金馬) | December 29, 2013 |
| 91 | "The Jizou Statue With the Hat (1)"; Transliteration: "Kasa jizō" (Japanese: 笠地蔵) | December 29, 2013 |
| 91 | "Odote-sama"; Transliteration: "Odote-sama" (Japanese: おドテさま) | December 29, 2013 |
A couple works hard but is still poor, and meets the new year with a sigh. On new years, a man can't sell his hemp so he trades it for an umbrella (repeat from episode 39) and an honest cow-herd meets a strange monster who can read thoughts.
| 92 | "The Safflower Ship"; Transliteration: "Benibana-bune" (Japanese: 紅花船) | January 5, 2014 |
| 92 | "The Story of the Twelve Signs of the Zodiac"; Transliteration: "Jūnishi no hanashi" (Japanese: 十二支のはなし) | January 5, 2014 |
| 92 | "Sent Salt"; Transliteration: "Okurareta shio" (Japanese: おくられた塩) | January 5, 2014 |
There is a splendid picture of a rooster in the room where the crimson flower merchant says. And they say that it crows at midnight. God creates the calendar to rule the world, and wants the animals to protect it. The animals all rush to God's temple on new years. But the rat lies to the cat (repeat from episode 40). Zenzaemon, of Kishou Swamp, is sent to learn the secrets of salt-making from Akou Province and is caught. But official Ooishi Kuranosuke is moved by his devotion to his homeland, and lets him go.
| 93 | "The Deer Springs"; Transliteration: "Shika supuringusu" (Japanese: 鹿スプリングス) | January 11, 2014 |
| 93 | "Tail Fishing"; Transliteration: "O-zuri" (Japanese: 尾釣り) | January 11, 2014 |
| 93 | "Hachirōtarō"; Transliteration: "Hachirōtarō" (Japanese: 八郎太郎) | January 11, 2014 |
A woodcutter meets a wounded deer in the mountains. He saves it from a hunter and watches until its wounds are healed... The Fox comes to see the river otter, who is good at catching fish. He takes fish from the river otter but never gives any himself. And so the River Otter comes up with an idea... (repeat from episode 41). A young man in the village of Matagi, Hachirōtarō, goes to the mountains with two of his friends, but as he gets ready for dinner he gives into his hunger and eats their fish.
| 94 | "The Herrings and the Old Woman"; Transliteration: "Nishin to rōba" (Japanese: ニシンと老婆) | January 18, 2014 |
| 94 | "The God of Wind and the Children"; Transliteration: "Kaze no kami to kodomo" (Japanese: 風の神と子ども) | January 18, 2014 |
| 94 | "The Spider's Determination"; Transliteration: "Kumo no ketsui" (Japanese: クモの決意) | January 18, 2014 |
An old woman loses her husband in a storm, but a statue of a god washes up with his boat and she worships it. One day in early spring, as the children are playing, a young man suddenly appears. A young carpenter is trying to build a bridge across a river, but every storm that comes washes it away.
| 95 | "Snake Lake"; Transliteration: "Sunēku mizuumi" (Japanese: スネーク湖) | January 25, 2014 |
| 95 | "The Deep Voice"; Transliteration: "Futoi koe" (Japanese: 太い声) | January 25, 2014 |
| 95 | "The Priest, the Kid, and the Fava Bean Tree"; Transliteration: "Shisai, kodomo, oyobi soramame mame no ki" (Japanese: 司祭、子供、およびソラマメ豆の木) | January 25, 2014 |
Governor Shimada has come to Kazusa, where there is no water and the harvest is dependent on the rain. Two men tie a pipe between their houses so they can talk even when they're snowed in. Even though they were alone, they could cheer each other up by talking, but then they stop getting answers... (repeat from episode 46). The priest tries to raise a fava bean tree to help the starving villagers, but the kids at the temple eat it.
| 96 | "Sumo Inari"; Transliteration: "Sumou Inari" (Japanese: 相撲稲荷) | February 2, 2014 |
| 96 | "The Fava Bean, Straw, and Charcoal"; Transliteration: "Soramame mame, sutorō, oyobi chakōru" (Japanese: ソラマメ豆、ストロー、およびチャコール) | February 2, 2014 |
| 96 | "The Man of the East and the Man of the West"; Transliteration: "Azuma no hito to seiyō no otoko" (Japanese: 東の人と西洋の男) | February 2, 2014 |
The lord of a poor province is sad to see how weak his sumo wrestlers are for this year's tournament, but they all defeat even the strongest wrestlers. A fava bean, a piece of straw, and a piece of charcoal all bounce out of an old woman's kitchen and decide to visit Ise (repeat from episode 42). There are two men who live on the east and west side of town, and each night they come to a bar to drink. They always drink the same drink, and insult each other.
| 97 | "The Stink Vine"; Transliteration: "Akushū no tsuru" (Japanese: 悪臭のつる) | February 9, 2014 |
| 97 | "Shippeitaro (1)"; Transliteration: "Shippeitarō" (Japanese: しっぺい太郎) | February 9, 2014 |
| 97 | "Half-Naked Buhyo"; Transliteration: "Hanra no buyō" (Japanese: 半裸の舞踊) | February 9, 2014 |
The stinkvine weed smelled terrible, and the big tree always made fun of it. To save a girl from a demon, a traveling monk goes to find the one thing it fears, "Shippeitaro" (repeat from episode 9). Buhei is a man proud of his strength.
| 98 | "The Whispering Vinegar"; Transliteration: "Sasayaku su" (Japanese: ささやく酢) | February 16, 2014 |
| 98 | "The Old Man Who Swallowed Birds"; Transliteration: "Tori wo nomikonda ōrudoman" (Japanese: 鳥を飲み込んだオールドマン) | February 16, 2014 |
| 98 | "The Tengu and the Sky Journey"; Transliteration: "Tengu to sukai no tabi" (Japanese: 天狗とスカイの旅) | February 16, 2014 |
There is a man who can hear the voices of the vinegar he makes. A bird gets its leg stuck in a rice ball. There was a young man who was afraid of nothing.
| 99 | "The Snow Woman (1)"; Transliteration: "Yukion'na" (Japanese: 雪女) | February 23, 2014 |
| 99 | "Oshira-sama (1)"; Transliteration: "Oshira-sama" (Japanese: おしら-様) | February 23, 2014 |
| 99 | "The 600-year-old Woman"; Transliteration: "600-sai no jōsei" (Japanese: 600歳の女性) | February 23, 2014 |
A young woodcutter seeks shelter from a blizzard with his master. A young woman has a horse she loves (repeat from episode 38). After the battle between the Heike and the Genji, a young girl finds a conch shell on the beach that she feeds to her mom.
| 100 | "Cow-love Pass"; Transliteration: "Ushi no ai no pasu" (Japanese: 牛の愛のパス) | March 2, 2014 |
| 100 | "Momotarō (1)"; Transliteration: "Momotarō" (Japanese: 桃太郎) | March 2, 2014 |
| 100 | "Seibei the Soba-Eater"; Transliteration: "Seibē soba taberu hito" (Japanese: 清兵衛そば食べる人) | March 2, 2014 |
Cowherd Okaru took care of a young black calf that transformed into a handsome young man when it was three years old. Momotarō is born from a peach, and raised by an old couple into a strong young boy (repeat from episode 40). Seibei is known as a man who loves to eat soba noodles.
| 101 | "The Demon Who Became a Rock"; Transliteration: "Rokku ni natta akuma" (Japanese: ロックになった悪魔) | March 9, 2014 |
| 101 | "Octopuses Don't Have Bones"; Transliteration: "Tako wa hone wo motte imasen" (Japanese: タコは骨を持っていません) | March 9, 2014 |
| 101 | "The Ryuuguu Abyss"; Transliteration: "Ryūgū no shin'en" (Japanese: 竜宮の深淵) | March 9, 2014 |
A demon and his son live in the mountains. The princess of Ryuuguu castle has a baby (repeat from episode 49). Taikichi, who always gives an offering to the Ryuuguu Abyss, is given a wife and child by Ryuuguu Palace.
| 102 | "Raita and the Demon"; Transliteration: "Raita to akuma" (Japanese: 雷太と悪魔) | March 16, 2014 |
| 102 | "'O' is hard" Transliteration: "'O' wa muzukashī desu" (Japanese: 「お」は難しいです) | March 16, 2014 |
| 102 | "The Burnt Statue"; Transliteration: "Bānto-zō" (Japanese: バーント像) | March 16, 2014 |
Asakichi and his wife save the thunder when it falls from heaven. A rough country girl who doesn't know how to be polite says "o" in front of everything because her mom tells her to (repeat from episode 48). A young, hardworking girl is to be adopted by her master, but his jealous wife makes her quit while the master is away.
| 103 | "Gonpachi and Tsubaki"; Transliteration: "Gonpachi to Tsubaki" (Japanese: 権八とツバキ) | March 23, 2014 |
| 103 | "The Thousand League Sandals"; Transliteration: "Sen rīgu no sandaru" (Japanese: 千リーグのサンダル) | March 23, 2014 |
| 103 | "Mother and Child Hill"; Transliteration: "Haha to ko no oka" (Japanese: 母と子の丘) | March 23, 2014 |
Gonpachi was working hard at a gold mine to raise money for his family. Three brothers get lost in the mountains and find themselves at the house of a terrifying mountain grannie (repeat from episode 50). A traveler comes to an inn on the Sumidagawa river. She's looking for her son who vanishes.
| 104 | "The Ear Priest Statue"; Transliteration: "Mimi no jizō" (Japanese: 耳の像) | March 30, 2014 |
| 104 | "The Kappa and the Handwashing Basin"; Transliteration: "Kappa to tearaibonchi" (Japanese: カッパと手洗い盆地) | March 30, 2014 |
| 104 | "The Little Chestnut"; Transliteration: "Ritoru chesunatto" (Japanese: リトルチェスナット) | March 30, 2014 |
A statue by the river reminds a boy of his dead mother. His stepmom tells him that if the statue will eat a rice ball, he can have one too, so off he goes (repeat from episode 82). A new hand washing basin has been put in the village shrine. But the kappa used this stone to sit on and think or keep watch (repeat from episode 87). A massive pumpkin grows from a tiny vine, and a man is very happy (repeat from episode 79).
| 105 | "The Mountain Grannie of Mt. Choufuku"; Transliteration: "Fujisan no yama obaasan kōfuku" (Japanese: 富士山の山おばあさん幸福) | April 6, 2014 |
| 105 | "Sadaroku and Shiro"; Transliteration: "Sadaroku to Shirō" (Japanese: Sadarokuと史郎) | April 6, 2014 |
| 105 | "Zashiki-Warashi (1)"; Transliteration: "Zashiki-Warashi" (Japanese: 座敷-わらし) | April 6, 2014 |
The mountain grannie has given birth to a child and the villagers are told to bring Mochi. The talented hunter Sadaroku is never found without his hunting dog, Shiro. He has a license to hunt wherever he wants, but one day he leaves it at home and is arrested. A traveling medicine seller stays at a mansion where he is visited by three young children in a dream. They were Zashiki-Warashi, said to bring prosperity.
| 106 | "Render the Fat"; Transliteration: "Shibō wo rendaringu" (Japanese: 脂肪をレンダリング) | April 13, 2014 |
| 106 | "The Star Wife"; Transliteration: "Sutā tsuma" (Japanese: スター妻) | April 13, 2014 |
| 106 | "The Rich Kashiki"; Transliteration: "Ritchi Kashiki" (Japanese: リッチ樫木) | April 13, 2014 |
A lazy man who wants to not work goes to a mansion where they feed him feasts every day. The eldest of the seven sisters of the big dipper falls in love with a man. A man on a fishing ship who makes the food, called a Kashiki, gave the leftovers to the fish.
| 107 | "The Phoenix"; Transliteration: "Hi no tori" (Japanese: 火の鳥) | April 20, 2014 |
| 107 | "The Wood Buddha and the Gold Buddha"; Transliteration: "Kibutsu kanabutsu" (Japanese: 木仏金仏) | April 20, 2014 |
| 107 | "Shibahama (1)"; Transliteration: "Shibahama" (Japanese: 芝浜) | April 20, 2014 |
The people of a village are beset by a firebird. They call upon the Lion King to protect them, and a great battle begins. A wooden buddha made by a faithful believer and a rich man's golden buddha have a sumo match. The rich man bets everything he owns, and the young man offers to become his servant forever, as a strange battle behinds. A lazy drunkard finds a wallet and uses it to throw a huge party. But when he wakes up it was a dream...!?
| 108 | "The Monk and the Turtle"; Transliteration: "Obōsan to kame" (Japanese: お坊さんとカメ) | April 27, 2014 |
| 108 | "Kijimuna"; Transliteration: "Kijimunā" (Japanese: キジムナー) | April 27, 2014 |
| 108 | "The Stingy Memorial"; Transliteration: "Kechi no tomurai" (Japanese: けちの弔い) | April 27, 2014 |
The monk and the turtle: A travelling monk saves a turtle, and the turtle later saves the monks life. The turtle reappears when the monk is in grave danger. Kijimuna: A mountain occurs near a small village, and the guardian tree of the village is burnt down. A mischievous fairy called a Kijimuna appears to beg for food, but he has a very good reasons. The stingy funeral: There was once a very stingy man. He doesn't know whom to give his money to when he dies. So he asks his three sons what kind of funeral they'd give him.
| 109 | "The Sending Star"; Transliteration: "Okuri boshi" (Japanese: おくり星) | May 4, 2014 |
| 109 | "The Promise with the Master of the River"; Transliteration: "Kawa no omo to no yakusoku" (Japanese: 川の主との約束) | May 4, 2014 |
| 109 | "Gonbei the Duck Hunter"; Transliteration: "Kamo tori Gonbē" (Japanese: 鴨とり権兵衛) | May 4, 2014 |
The Sending Star: A young, hard-working man hears that his grandmother is dying. He visits her house and sees that she is fine. On his way home, he finds himself in great peril... A promise with the master of the river: A boy is born and it is prophesied that his life will be taken by the master of the river when he turns 18. The year of his 18th birthday, a huge rain causes the river to almost flood. Gonbei the Duck Hunter: A hunter named Gonbei ties a rope around the legs of 50 ducks stuck in the water, but when it melts they fly off, dragging him towards a great adventure.
| 110 | "Takohachi the Rich Man (1)"; Transliteration: "Takohachi chōja" (Japanese: 蛸八長者) | May 11, 2014 |
| 110 | "The Rich Man and Bracken"; Transliteration: "Chōja to warabi" (Japanese: 長者とわらび) | May 11, 2014 |
| 110 | "The Wife's Talent"; Transliteration: "Yome no saikaku" (Japanese: 嫁の才覚) | May 11, 2014 |
With the help of his loving son, an old octopus fisher goes on a trip. There was a very rich man who promised to pluck all the warabi off the mountain in a single day. An old couple turn to fraud to make more money at their store, but drive customers away.
| 111 | "Eating in Order"; Transliteration: "Junguri gui" (Japanese: 順ぐり食い) | May 18, 2014 |
| 111 | "The Old Woman Who Became a God"; Transliteration: "Kami to natta rōba" (Japanese: 神となった老婆) | May 18, 2014 |
| 111 | "Yayoi's Ship"; Transliteration: "Yayoi no fune" (Japanese: やよいの船) | May 18, 2014 |
A master hunter goes to the mountain, where he has a dream of a frog eating a worm, and then being eaten by a snake. An Ainu village is attacked, and an old woman and her grandson Tonkuru escape into the forest where they get separated. A girl named Yayoi crosses the mountains every day to go to work, and each day she would talk to a tree.
| 112 | "Masakichi and the Jizo Statue"; Transliteration: "Masakichi to jizō-san" (Japanese: 政吉と地蔵さん) | May 25, 2014 |
| 112 | "The Bee and the Bandit"; Transliteration: "Hachi to sanzoku" (Japanese: 蜂と山賊) | May 25, 2014 |
| 112 | "The God of Death"; Transliteration: "Shinigami" (Japanese: 死神) | May 25, 2014 |
Masakichi, a fisherman who picked up a priest statue from a wrecked ship, is visited by it in his dreams. The merchants of Kyoto are attacked by bandits. They manage to escape but their horses and goods are stolen. A loser meets the god of death, who tells him to become a doctor. He does as he's told and immediately becomes very rich...
| 113 | "The Sun and the Golden Rope"; Transliteration: "Otento-sama to kin no tsuna" (Japanese: お天道さまと金の綱) | June 1, 2014 |
| 113 | "The Kid and the 31 Characters"; Transliteration: "Kozō to misohitomoji" (Japanese: 小僧と三十一文字（みそひともじ）) | June 1, 2014 |
| 113 | "Ushiwakamaru (1)"; Transliteration: "Ushiwakamaru" (Japanese: 牛若丸) | June 1, 2014 |
A mother raises two sons alone after her husband dies. A boy at a temple hides two buns to give them to a kind family, but snow falls and he doesn't know where they are... The Tengu of Mt. Kurama gives Ushiwakamaru his father's sword, and trains him to become a great samurai.
| 114 | "The Trout Repays a Debt"; Transliteration: "Masu no ongaeshi" (Japanese: 鱒の恩返し) | June 8, 2014 |
| 114 | "The Foreigner's Cowbones"; Transliteration: "Ijin no ushibone" (Japanese: 異人の牛骨) | June 8, 2014 |
| 114 | "The Six Warriors"; Transliteration: "Roku-ri no mosa" (Japanese: 六人の猛者) | June 8, 2014 |
A man works hard at tilling an arid field near a river. A girl saves his mother from drowning and he marries her. A foreign ship crashes near a small fishing village.A young man leaves on a journey to become strong, and encounters more and more friends with surprising talents.
| 115 | "Matsu Goes to Ise"; Transliteration: "O-Isemairi no matsu" (Japanese: お伊勢参りの松) | June 15, 2014 |
| 115 | "The Zatou's Tree"; Transliteration: "Zatō-san no ki" (Japanese: 座頭さんの木) | June 15, 2014 |
| 115 | "The Powerful Servant"; Transliteration: "Chikaramochi no hōkōnin" (Japanese: 力持ちの奉公人) | June 15, 2014 |
A young man meets an old man on the way to Ise, and promises to visit his village. A boatman saves a blind man from a flood, but the blind man dies. A rich man has a very powerful servant. The servant is smart, too, so the rich man gives him one challenge after another.
| 116 | "The Weasel and the Rat"; Transliteration: "Itachi no nezumi" (Japanese: いたちとねずみ) | June 29, 2014 |
| 116 | "Kotaro and the Dragon"; Transliteration: "Kotarō to ryū" (Japanese: 小太郎と竜) | June 29, 2014 |
| 116 | "The Thunder God and the Girl"; Transliteration: "Kaminari-san to musume" (Japanese: 雷さんと娘) | June 29, 2014 |
A weasel and a rat plant a field with chestnuts because they're starving. Kotaro goes to visit his mother up the river when the woman who raised him dies. A lightning god comes to Earth and finds a woman who he falls in love with.
| 117 | "The Treasure Swamp"; Transliteration: "Takara no numa" (Japanese: 宝の沼) | July 6, 2014 |
| 117 | "Tatsukohime"; Transliteration: "Tatsuko-hime" (Japanese: 辰子姫) | July 6, 2014 |
| 117 | "Kurohime and the Dragon"; Transliteration: "Kuro-hime to ryū" (Japanese: 黒姫と竜) | July 6, 2014 |
A rich man learns of a treasure in a swamp and forces his servants to drain it. Tatsuko goes to a shrine in the mountain every night seeking eternal beauty. The black dragon, who is the master of a huge swamp, wants to marry the beautiful Kurohime.
| 118 | "The Carried Priest"; Transliteration: "Onbusareta obōsan" (Japanese: おんぶされたお坊さん) | July 13, 2014 |
| 118 | "The Man Who Knew Hell"; Transliteration: "Jigoku wo shitta otoko" (Japanese: 地獄を知った男) | July 13, 2014 |
| 118 | "The Ghost Ladle"; Transliteration: "Yūrei no hishaku" (Japanese: 幽霊のひしゃく) | July 13, 2014 |
Late one night, a thief tricks a priest into letting him ride on his shoulders, hoping to steal the priest's cloak. A priest stays the night at an old temple, where he sees demons torturing a young girl. A sailor is attacked by ghost ships in the Seto Inland Sea, and is the only survivor.
| 119 | "The Bride on a Hazy Moonlit Night"; Transliteration: "Oborozukiyo no yome-san" (Japanese: おぼろ月夜の嫁さん) | July 20, 2014 |
| 119 | "Hitomokko Mountain"; Transliteration: "Hitomokkoyama" (Japanese: 一モッコ山) | July 20, 2014 |
| 119 | "The Flying Shed"; Transliteration: "Tobi kura" (Japanese: とびくら) | July 20, 2014 |
A poor young man lets a traveling girl stay the night in his hut, and ends up marrying her. Two giants compete to build the largest mountain in Japan. A rich man sends a letter to a local priest. If he'll come to the rich man's house and pray, he'll be given a barrel of rice.
| 120 | "Ikkyuu-san Defeats the Tiger"; Transliteration: "Ikkyū-san no tori-taiji" (Japanese: 一休さんの虎退治) | July 27, 2014 |
| 120 | "The Mountain God and the Child"; Transliteration: "Yamanokami to kodomo" (Japanese: 山の神と子供) | July 27, 2014 |
| 120 | "Tsurumizuka"; Transliteration: "Tsurumizuka" (Japanese: 鶴見塚) | July 27, 2014 |
Ikkyuu is a smart young man. The shogun hears about him and gives him a difficult task: defeating a tiger that lives inside a painting. A child meets an old man in the mountains who tells him that if he goes to the mountain god's shrine and prays, his wish will come true. An old man saves a crane who's been caught by some children.
| 121 | "The Mole and the Sun"; Transliteration: "Mogura to taiyō" (Japanese: もぐらと太陽) | August 3, 2014 |
| 121 | "The Fox Repays a Debt"; Transliteration: "Kitsune no ongaeshi" (Japanese: 狐の恩返し) | August 3, 2014 |
| 121 | "Drinking Tea"; Transliteration: "Cha nomi" (Japanese: 茶のみ) | August 3, 2014 |
The mole clan is very rough and violent. They plan to shoot down the sun. A young hunter saves a fox from being eaten by a snake. An old man known for his wit wins a game against the local lord, who challenges him to bring 10 barrels of tea seeds in an attempt to get revenge.
| 122 | "Dragon God Granny"; Transliteration: "Ryūjin baba-sama" (Japanese: 龍神婆さま) | August 10, 2014 |
| 122 | "You Can't Shake Sleeves You Don't Have"; Transliteration: "Nai sode wa furenai" (Japanese: ない袖はふれない) | August 10, 2014 |
| 122 | "The Raccoon Forest of Shoujou Temple (1)"; Transliteration: "Shōjō-ji no tanukibayashi" (Japanese: しょうじょう寺の狸ばやし) | August 10, 2014 |
An old woman who is an excellent midwife hears a woman in pain with a difficult birth. A man saves a snake and is rewarded with a strange sleeve that creates money when shaken. A ghost in an old temple turns out to be a raccoon.
| 123 | "The Buddha That Keeps Away Fire"; Transliteration: "Hi yoke boteke" (Japanese: 火除け仏) | August 17, 2014 |
| 123 | "The Curse of the Willow"; Transliteration: "Yanagi to tatari" (Japanese: 柳のたたり) | August 17, 2014 |
| 123 | "The House That Would Not Eat Salmon"; Transliteration: "Sake wo kuwanu ie" (Japanese: 鮭を食わぬ家) | August 17, 2014 |
There is a kid who works hard but the priest has never seen him work hard. Yahei's friends cut down a willow tree, and their tongues were ripped out of their throats and they died horrible deaths. Okoma is kidnapped by an eagle and saved by a salmon.
| 124 | "The Soul that was Hunted by the Dead"; Transliteration: "Mōja ga neratta tamashī" (Japanese: 亡者が狙った魂) | August 24, 2014 |
| 124 | "Octopus Bhaisajyaguru"; Transliteration: "Tako Yakushi" (Japanese: たこ薬師) | August 24, 2014 |
| 124 | "The Nursing Willow"; Transliteration: "Uba yanagi" (Japanese: 乳母柳) | August 24, 2014 |
A wife weaves her loom to raise money for the family, but the spirits of the dead hear the sound and come to claim her soul. A monk buys some octopus for his ailing mother, but an irritating local man calls him out. A man raises his daughter alone, and one day a woman under a willow tree gives her milk.
| 125 | "The Bean and the Priest Statue"; Transliteration: "Mamekko to jizō-sama" (Japanese: 豆っこと地蔵さま) | August 31, 2014 |
| 125 | "The Reed Spring"; Transliteration: "Ashi no izumi" (Japanese: 葦（あし）の泉) | August 31, 2014 |
| 125 | "White Bird Pass"; Transliteration: "Hakuchō no seki" (Japanese: 白鳥の関) | August 31, 2014 |
An honest old man's bean is eaten by a priest statue, and in exchange he gets a demon's treasure. A man saves a snake from a volcano and is given a reed full of water that will make a spring. A farmer saves a wounded swan, and marries a beautiful woman.
| 126 | "Asamutsu Bridge"; Transliteration: "Asamutsubashi" (Japanese: 朝六橋) | September 7, 2014 |
| 126 | "The Strong Wife"; Transliteration: "Kairiki no nyōbō" (Japanese: 怪力の女房) | September 7, 2014 |
| 126 | "The Flower-Watching Ghost"; Transliteration: "O-hanami yūrei" (Japanese: お花見ゆうれい) | September 7, 2014 |
A man looks for a box of treasure at a bridge A couple is dealing with a violent governor. An old man who loves to drink finds a skull in a field.
| 127 | "The Priest Statue Falls in Love"; Transliteration: "Koisuru jizō-sama" (Japanese: 恋する地蔵さま) | September 14, 2014 |
| 127 | "The Flat Nose of the Trickster Fox"; Transliteration: "Itazura kitsune no pechanko hana" (Japanese: いたずら狐のぺちゃんこ鼻) | September 14, 2014 |
| 127 | "A Room with an Owl"; Transliteration: "Fukurō kon'ya" (Japanese: ふくろう紺屋) | September 14, 2014 |
A statue falls in love and goes to visit its lover every night. A trickster fox loves to tease an old man, but one night it goes a little too far. An owl dies[sic] a crow different colors, but the crow doesn't like them.
| 128 | "The Cat's Teacup (1)"; Transliteration: "Neko no chawan" (Japanese: ねこの茶碗) | September 21, 2014 |
| 128 | "Monogusatarō (1)"; Transliteration: "Monogusatarō" (Japanese: ものぐさ太郎) | September 21, 2014 |
| 128 | "The Monkey and the Toad"; Transliteration: "Saru to hikagaeru" (Japanese: 猿とひかがえる) | September 21, 2014 |
A man finds an expensive bowl being used as a cat dish and schemes to get it. A lazy man is sent to the capital to work. A monkey and a toad go to Ise, but the monkey does all the work.
| 129 | "The Kannon Statue of Love"; Transliteration: "Enmusubi no Kannon-sama" (Japanese: 縁結びの観音さま) | September 28, 2014 |
| 129 | "The Box that Doesn't Open"; Transliteration: "Akazu no hako" (Japanese: 開かずの箱) | September 28, 2014 |
| 129 | "Candle Confusion"; Transliteration: "Rōsoku sōdō" (Japanese: ろうそく騒動) | September 28, 2014 |
A fisherman meets a girl with the help of a goddess, but her parents are opposed to their marriage. He tries to send her home, but... To build a shrine in their town, the villagers hire a man named Takumi. At night Takumi's dolls do the work for him. A priest brings back candles as a gift, but the villagers don't know what they are. One pretends that they're a kind of food...
| 130 | "The Old Man Who Made the Dead Trees Blossom (2)"; Transliteration: "Hanasaka jīsan" (Japanese: 花さか爺さん) | October 5, 2014 |
| 130 | "The Thousand Coin Orange"; Transliteration: "Senryō mikan" (Japanese: 千両みかん) | October 5, 2014 |
| 130 | "Paradise Thief (1)"; Transliteration: "Gokuraku dorobō" (Japanese: 極楽泥棒) | October 5, 2014 |
A kind old man raises a dog named Shiro, but his greedy neighbor kills it. When he spreads the ashes in the garden... (this tale is a renewal). A rich young man is ill and wants an orange, but it's the middle of summer. The head clerk runs all over town and finally finds one. A thief tries to break into a brewery but is knocked out by the owner. The owner thinks the thief is dead and abandons him next to a river.
| 131 | "The Crane Repays a Debt (2)"; Transliteration: "Tsuru no Ongaeshi" (Japanese: 鶴の恩返し) | October 12, 2014 |
| 131 | "Tower of Warthogs"; Transliteration: "Inoshishi no tō" (Japanese: イノシシの塔) | October 12, 2014 |
| 131 | "Lightning and the Stone Urn"; Transliteration: "Kaminari to ishibitsu" (Japanese: 雷と石びつ) | October 12, 2014 |
A poor man saves a wounded bird, and a beautiful woman comes to be his bride. The beautiful cloths she weaves sell for a high price, but... (this tale is a renewal). A young man loves to play the flute, but is forced to prove his bravery by slaying 100 boars. A man makes a stupid wish accidentally, and now a god will kill his son on his seventh birthday.
| 132 | "The Extending Head (1)"; Transliteration: "Rokurokubi" (Japanese: ろくろ首) | October 19, 2014 |
| 132 | "Strong Tarō (2)"; Transliteration: "Chikaratarō" (Japanese: 力太郎) | October 19, 2014 |
| 132 | "Kijimuna and the Sea God"; Transliteration: "Kijimunā to umi no kami" (Japanese: キジムナーと海の神) | October 19, 2014 |
A man marries a beautiful, rich wife, but is warned never to wake up in the middle of the night. One night he wakes up. An old couple build a child out of the dirt from their bodies. It comes alive and becomes their son (this tale is a renewal). The Kijimuna fairies that were saved by an old couple fill a beach with flowers but the sea god gets angry.
| 133 | "Nopperabou"; Transliteration: "Nopperabō" (Japanese: のっぺらぼう) | October 26, 2014 |
| 133 | "Princess Kaguya (2)"; Transliteration: "Kaguya-hime" (Japanese: かぐや姫) | October 26, 2014 |
| 133 | "Sutokuin"; Transliteration: "Sutokuin" (Japanese: 崇徳院) | October 26, 2014 |
A man meets a woman with no face outside of town. He runs to tell someone, but everyone he sees is a faceless monster. An old man finds a beautiful young girl inside a bamboo tree (this tale is a renewal). A servant works hard to find the woman his master is in love with.
| 134 | "Soba and Mochi"; Transliteration: "Soba to Mochi" (Japanese: そばと餅) | November 2, 2014 |
| 134 | "Crab Questions and Answers"; Transliteration: "Kani mondō" (Japanese: 蟹問答) | November 2, 2014 |
| 134 | "The Old Man and His Bump (2)"; Transliteration: "Kobutori jīsan" (Japanese: こぶとり爺さん) | November 2, 2014 |
A traveler gets help from a mountain couple, a priest battles an evil entity, and an old man gets a double trouble (this tale is a renewal).
| 135 | "Kintarō (2)"; Transliteration: "Kintarō" (Japanese: 金太郎) | November 9, 2014 |
| 135 | "The Cat of Nekodake"; Transliteration: "Nekodake no neko" (Japanese: 根子岳の猫) | November 9, 2014 |
| 135 | "A Bull Running on a Moonlit Night"; Transliteration: "Tsukiyo ni kakeru ushi" (Japanese: 月夜に駆ける牛) | November 9, 2014 |
Kintarō is a very strong boy who wants to find his father (this tale is a renewal). A man stays at a mansion filled with monster cats. A rampaging bull destroys fields on moonlit nights.
| 136 | "Straw Millionaire (2)"; Transliteration: "Warashibe chōja" (Japanese: わらしべ長者) | November 16, 2014 |
| 136 | "The Bow and Arrow Brothers"; Transliteration: "Yumiya no kyōdai" (Japanese: 弓矢の兄弟) | November 16, 2014 |
| 136 | "The Shrine Priestess' Dance"; Transliteration: "Miko no mai" (Japanese: 巫女の舞) | November 16, 2014 |
A man who is all alone in the world takes the advice of a goddess and trades a single piece of straw into a fortune (this tale is a renewal). Two brothers who are masters of the bow stop at a village haunted by a monster. They decide to get rid of it. A brave young boy goes to a forbidden shrine, and doesn't come back.
| 137 | "The Woodcutter and the Monster Crab"; Transliteration: "Kikori to bakegani" (Japanese: 木こりと化け蟹) | November 23, 2014 |
| 137 | "The Monster Tamer (1)"; Transliteration: "Bakemonozukai" (Japanese: 化け物使い) | November 23, 2014 |
| 137 | "The Rolling Rice Ball (2)"; Transliteration: "Omusubi kororin" (Japanese: おむすびころりん) | November 23, 2014 |
A talented woodcutter enters a forbidden forest and is assaulted by a monster crab. An old man is famous for being rough on his servants. Since nobody wants to work for him, he hires monsters. An old man gives a rat a rice ball, and as thanks is taken to a magical world (this tale is a renewal).
| 138 | "The Raccoon's Spinning Wheel (1)"; Transliteration: "Tanuki no itoguruma" (Japanese: たぬきの糸車) | November 30, 2014 |
| 138 | "The Two Moons"; Transliteration: "Futatsu no tsuki" (Japanese: 二つの月) | November 30, 2014 |
| 138 | "The Mountain Where you Leave Grandma to Die"; Transliteration: "Ubasuteyama" (Japanese: 姥捨て山) | November 30, 2014 |
A raccoon comes to a woodcutter's house and learns to work a spinning wheel. On a moonlit night, a giant snake appears with two moons in tow and swallows a hunter. His daughters find out and swear revenge. A lord issues an order that anybody who turns 60 must be left in the mountains to die. A son tearfully takes his mom up to the mountains but can't bear to [do] it. He hides her beneath the floor (this tale is a renewal).
| 139 | "The Blessing the Rat Brought"; Transliteration: "Nezumi ga kureta kō" (Japanese: ねずみがくれた幸) | December 7, 2014 |
| 139 | "Urashima Tarō (2)"; Transliteration: "Urashimatarō" (Japanese: 浦島太郎) | December 7, 2014 |
| 139 | "The Kajika Folding Screen"; Transliteration: "Kajika no byōbu" (Japanese: 河鹿(かじか)の屏風) | December 7, 2014 |
A man saves a rat who is being bullied, and is granted great fortune. A man saves a turtle who is being bullied, and is taken to an undersea palace (this tale is a renewal). A man saves the frogs in a swamp, and is given a magic folding screen.
| 140 | "Little One Inch (2)"; Transliteration: "Issun-bōshi" (Japanese: 一寸法師) | December 14, 2014 |
| 140 | "The Wolf Rock"; Transliteration: "Ōkami ishi" (Japanese: オオカミ石) | December 14, 2014 |
| 140 | "Meguro's Saury (1)"; Transliteration: "Meguro no sanma" (Japanese: 目黒のさんま) | December 14, 2014 |
A boy the size of a thumb defeats a demon (this tale is a renewal). A girl seeks shelter on a snowy night, but is forced to sleep under the porch and a pack of hungry wolves approach her. The lord of a local province learns to love pike.
| 141 | "Zenroku the Sawyer"; Transliteration: "Daihiki no Zenroku" (Japanese: 大挽きの善六) | December 21, 2014 |
| 141 | "The Winged Robe of Heaven (2)"; Transliteration: "Ama no hagoromo" (Japanese: 天の羽衣) | December 21, 2014 |
| 141 | "The Hermit Orange"; Transliteration: "Sen'nin mikan" (Japanese: 仙人みかん) | December 21, 2014 |
A lazy man named Zenroku learns to become a great sawyer. A man finds a celestial maiden's cloth and steals it, and forces her to become his wife (this tale is a renewal). Two ancient sages play a game of go inside an orange.
| 142 | "The Gods of Poverty Play Sumo"; Transliteration: "Sumou wo totta binbōgami" (Japanese: 相撲を取った貧乏神) | December 28, 2014 |
| 142 | "Trip, Trip"; Transliteration: "Korobu korobu" (Japanese: ころぶころぶ) | December 28, 2014 |
| 142 | "The Jizou Statue With the Hat (2)"; Transliteration: "Kasa jizō" (Japanese: 笠地蔵) | December 28, 2014 |
A hard working family refuses to give in to poverty so the God of Poverty haunting them is to be fired. But they want him to stay. A strange child shouts, "Poor! Trip!" at a poor elderly couple on new years. A poor man gives a priest statue a straw hat, and is given blessings in return (this tale is a renewal).
| 143 | "The Bunbuku Teapot"; Transliteration: "Bunbuku chagama" (Japanese: 分福茶釜) | January 4, 2015 |
| 143 | "The Anbarayami Horse"; Transliteration: "Anbarayami no uma" (Japanese: あんばらやみの馬) | January 4, 2015 |
| 143 | "The Stone Door of Heaven"; Transliteration: "Amano-iwato" (Japanese: 天の岩戸) | January 4, 2015 |
A hard working family refuses to give in to poverty so the God of Poverty haunting them is to be fired. But they want him to stay. A strange child shouts, "Poor! Trip!" at a poor elderly couple on new years. A poor man gives a priest statue a straw hat, and is given blessings in return.
| 144 | "Wakahime of Ryuuguu"; Transliteration: "Ryūgū no wakahime" (Japanese: 竜宮の若姫) | January 11, 2015 |
| 144 | "The Mortar That Made Salt (2)"; Transliteration: "Shio-fuki usu" (Japanese: 塩ふき臼) | January 11, 2015 |
| 144 | "The Escaped Sparrow"; Transliteration: "Nuke suzume" (Japanese: 抜け雀) | January 11, 2015 |
A young man throws all his firewood into a whirlpool, and the next day he's visited by a woman from the undersea palace of Ryuuguu. A millet makes salt, and never stops (this tale is a renewal). Magical birds escape from a painting drawn by a master.
| 145 | "The Two Virtues"; Transliteration: "Futatsu no toku" (Japanese: 二つの徳) | January 18, 2015 |
| 145 | "Udo-san's Journey"; Transliteration: "Udo-san mairi" (Japanese: 鵜戸さん参り) | January 18, 2015 |
| 145 | "The Monkey Buddha (2)"; Transliteration: "Saru jizō" (Japanese: 猿地蔵) | January 18, 2015 |
Married by the gods, a sneaky snake, and you can't get the priest butt wet! (this tale is a renewal).
| 146 | "Momotarō (2)"; Transliteration: "Momotarō" (Japanese: 桃太郎) | January 25, 2015 |
| 146 | "The Mountain Bird's Arrow"; Transliteration: "Yamadori no ya" (Japanese: 山鳥の矢) | January 25, 2015 |
| 146 | "The Thunder God that Married the Soba Stand Owner"; Transliteration: "Soba-ya no muko ni natta kaminari" (Japanese: そば屋の婿になった雷) | January 25, 2015 |
A boy is born from a peach and beats a demon (this tale is a renewal). A fierce hawk kills animals on a winter mountain, and only a hunter can stop it. A thunder god falls in love with the owner of a soba stand and marries her.
| 147 | "Ofuku and the Oni"; Transliteration: "Ofuku to oni" (Japanese: お福と鬼) | February 1, 2015 |
| 147 | "The Oni's Toshitori"; Transliteration: "Oni no toshitori" (Japanese: 鬼の年取り) | February 1, 2015 |
| 147 | "The Priest and the Raccoon"; Transliteration: "Shōnin-sama to tanuki" (Japanese: 上人さまと狸) | February 1, 2015 |
A girl named Ofuku is kidnapped by a terrible demon, but she has a plan. A couple invites a demon into their homes on the way when demons are normally driven out. A priest becomes friends with a raccoon couple who want to hear the sutras he recites.
| 148 | "The Golden Egg"; Transliteration: "Kin'iro no tamago" (Japanese: 金色の卵) | February 8, 2015 |
| 148 | "The Man Who Became a Turtle"; Transliteration: "Kame ni natta otoko" (Japanese: 亀になった男) | February 8, 2015 |
| 148 | "Sannen Netarō (2)"; Transliteration: "Sannen Netarō" (Japanese: 三年寝太郎) | February 8, 2015 |
A man finds a golden egg and takes it home, and a baby hatches from it. A man is cruel to his hard-working wife, who leaves him. Then he turns into a turtle. A lazy man sleeps all day, when a drought comes its time for him to work (this tale is a renewal).
| 149 | "The Horsefly Repays a Debt"; Transliteration: "Abu no ongaeshi" (Japanese: あぶの恩返し) | February 15, 2015 |
| 149 | "The Thunder God and the Doctor"; Transliteration: "Kaminari-sama to oisha-sama" (Japanese: 雷さまとお医者さま) | February 15, 2015 |
| 149 | "The Painted Wife (2)"; Transliteration: "E-sugata nyōbō" (Japanese: 絵姿女房) | February 15, 2015 |
A man saves a horsefly, who repays him by helping him marry the headman's daughter. A doctor of moxibustion heals a thunder god who has a bad hip. A man loves to look at his wife so much that he can't work, so she gives him a picture of himself (this tale is a renewal).
| 150 | "The Water Seed"; Transliteration: "Mizu no tane" (Japanese: 水の種) | February 22, 2015 |
| 150 | "The Blessing Rat"; Transliteration: "Fuku nezumi" (Japanese: 福ねずみ) | February 22, 2015 |
| 150 | "The Hermit Who Did Nothing"; Transliteration: "Nan'nimo senhito" (Japanese: なんにもせん人) | February 22, 2015 |
A man helps a snake and is taken to the dragon god's palace, and the dragon god offers him anything he wants. He asks for water for his village. A white rat brings blessings to a man but his greedy neighbor steals it. A lazy man finds a tiny hermit in a pot. The lazier he is the more the hermit grows, until at last it fills the whole house.
| 151 | "The Weight Fox"; Transliteration: "Fundō kitsune" (Japanese: 分銅狐) | March 1, 2015 |
| 151 | "The Most Important Man in the World"; Transliteration: "Kono yode ichiban erai mono" (Japanese: この世で一番えらい者) | March 1, 2015 |
| 151 | "The Night Forest of the Hina Dolls (1)"; Transliteration: "Hina no yobayashi" (Japanese: 雛の夜ばやし) | March 1, 2015 |
A god gives a man a fox who helps him in business, but the fox demands an exponential price in return. A stonecutter learns who the most important man in the world is. Dolls come out to play at night on Doll's Day.
| 152 | "The Mountain Grannie and the Traveling Performer"; Transliteration: "Yamanba to tabigeinin" (Japanese: 山姥と旅芸人) | March 8, 2015 |
| 152 | "Sentoku's Money"; Transliteration: "Sentoku no kin" (Japanese: せんとくの金) | March 8, 2015 |
| 152 | "Okoze's Love"; Transliteration: "Okoze no koi" (Japanese: おこぜの恋) | March 8, 2015 |
A traveling performer gets lost on a mountain at night, and encounters a mountain grannie. The grannie asks him to perform. A monk finds an envelope of money for a boy named "Sentoku." An ugly stonefish tries to confess its love to a beautiful girl fish.
| 153 | "The Thief's Loss"; Transliteration: "Dorobō no son" (Japanese: 泥棒の損) | March 15, 2015 |
| 153 | "The Horse, Dog, Cat, and Chicken Go On A Journey"; Transliteration: "Uma to inu to neko to niwatori no tabi" (Japanese: 馬と犬と猫と鶏の旅) | March 15, 2015 |
| 153 | "Stories For Ten Coins"; Transliteration: "Hanashi jūryō" (Japanese: 話十両) | March 15, 2015 |
A thief helps a sick boy instead of stealing. A horse, a cat, a dog, and a chicken go on a journey. Stories are sold for ten gold coins.
| 154 | "The Horse and the Kaaranbe"; Transliteration: "Uma to kaaranbe" (Japanese: 馬とカアランベ) | March 22, 2015 |
| 154 | "The White Fox Repays a Debt"; Transliteration: "Byakko no ongaeshi" (Japanese: 白狐の恩返し) | March 22, 2015 |
| 154 | "Sarasarayasara"; Transliteration: "Sarasarayasara" (Japanese: さらさらやさら) | March 22, 2015 |
A man washes his horse in the river, and the horse is attacked by evil imps. A white fox repays a debt. A lord and a peasant woman exchange beautiful poems.
| 155 | "Momotarō (2)"; Transliteration: "Momotarō" (Japanese: 桃太郎) | March 29, 2015 |
| 155 | "Kintarō (2)"; Transliteration: "Kintarō" (Japanese: 金太郎) | March 29, 2015 |
| 155 | "Urashima Tarō (2)"; Transliteration: "Urashimatarō" (Japanese: 浦島太郎) | March 29, 2015 |
A boy is born from a peach and beats a demon (repeat from episode 146). Kintarō is a very strong boy who wants to find his father (repeat from episode 135). A man saves a turtle who is being bullied, and is taken to an undersea palace (repeat from episode 139).
| 156 | "Monkey and Crab (2)"; Transliteration: "Saru kani" (Japanese: さるかに) | April 5, 2015 |
| 156 | "Greedy Kihachi"; Transliteration: "Yokubari kihachi" (Japanese: 欲張り喜八) | April 5, 2015 |
| 156 | "The Spider's Twill"; Transliteration: "Kumo no ayaori" (Japanese: 蜘蛛の綾織) | April 5, 2015 |
Crab children seek vengeance on a monkey who hurt their mother (this tale is a renewal). A greedy man finds a shrine that doubles his money. A man saves a spider and marries a beautiful woman, who makes him rich with her splendid weaving.
| 157 | "Scary Meat Buns (2)"; Transliteration: "Manjū kowai" (Japanese: まんじゅうこわい) | April 12, 2015 |
| 157 | "The Raindrop Monster"; Transliteration: "Amadare no bakemono" (Japanese: 雨だれの化物) | April 12, 2015 |
| 157 | "The Carpenter and Oniroku (2)"; Transliteration: "Daiku to Oniroku" (Japanese: 大工と鬼六) | April 12, 2015 |
A worker is terrified of meat buns (this tale is a renewal). A raindrop monster. A demon puts a carpenter in an unwanted deal (this tale is a renewal).
| 158 | "Kachikachi Yama (2)"; Transliteration: "Kachikachiyama" (Japanese: かちかち山) | April 19, 2015 |
| 158 | "Long Arms and Long Legs"; Transliteration: "Ashinagatenaga" (Japanese: 足長手長) | April 19, 2015 |
| 158 | "Mountain Monk Rock"; Transliteration: "Yama bushi ishi" (Japanese: 山伏石) | April 19, 2015 |
A rabbit seeks revenge when a raccoon's pranks go too far (this tale is a renewal). Two monsters are defeated by a Buddhist monk. A wandering monk battles a horrifying monster who turns her victims to stone.
| 159 | "Ash-Covered Haitarō"; Transliteration: "Haikaburi Haitarō" (Japanese: 灰かぶり灰太郎) | April 26, 2015 |
| 159 | "The Tengu's Sake"; Transliteration: "Tengu no sake" (Japanese: 天狗の酒) | April 26, 2015 |
| 159 | "Kanekichi the Flute Player"; Transliteration: "Fuefuki Kanekichi" (Japanese: 笛吹き兼吉) | April 26, 2015 |
A noble boy is covered in ashes to hide his true identity. A Tengu turns a lake into sake, and threatens a boy if he reveals the secret. A man named Kanekichi plays a flute so beautifully it entrances even the animals.
| 160 | "The Fox of Battari Stream"; Transliteration: "Battari sawa no kitsune" (Japanese: バッタリ沢のキツネ) | May 3, 2015 |
| 160 | "Celebratory Sumo"; Transliteration: "Iwai no sumō" (Japanese: 祝いの相撲) | May 3, 2015 |
| 160 | "The Silence Contest (2)"; Transliteration: "Danmari kurabe" (Japanese: だんまりくらべ) | May 3, 2015 |
A fox impersonates a man's wife. Gods play a game of sumo to celebrate a change of fortune in a household. An old couple has a quiet contest that's interrupted by a thief (this tale is a renewal).
| 161 | "The Cowherding Priest Statue"; Transliteration: "Hanatori no jizō-san" (Japanese: 鼻とりの地蔵さん) | May 10, 2015 |
| 161 | "Tanokyuu (2)"; Transliteration: "Tanokyū" (Japanese: たのきゅう) | May 10, 2015 |
| 161 | "Whale Bridge"; Transliteration: "Kujira-bashi" (Japanese: 鯨橋) | May 10, 2015 |
A priest statue helps an old man. A traveling performer meets a giant snake that devours travelers (this tale is a renewal). A fishing village angers the whales and pays a terrible price.
| 162 | "Tenshiki"; Transliteration: "Tenshiki" (Japanese: 転失気(てんしき)) | May 17, 2015 |
| 162 | "The Snot-Nosed Boy (2)"; Transliteration: "Hanatare kozō" (Japanese: 鼻たれ小僧) | May 17, 2015 |
| 162 | "Mayoiga"; Transliteration: "Mayoiga" (Japanese: マヨイガ) | May 17, 2015 |
A priest sends a boy into town to learn about the mysterious "tenshiki". A snot-nosed boy can grant any wish, but he drools all the time (this tale is a renewal). A lost house gives wonderful presents.
| 163 | "The Priest Becomes a Carp"; Transliteration: "Koi no natta oshō-san" (Japanese: 鯉になった和尚さん) | May 24, 2015 |
| 163 | "The Pot's Song"; Transliteration: "Okama no uta" (Japanese: お釜の歌) | May 24, 2015 |
| 163 | "Teapot"; Transliteration: "Cha-tsubo" (Japanese: 茶つぼ) | May 24, 2015 |
A priest turns into a carp while he is very sick. A singing pot tells of treasure. A giant teapot monster haunts an abandoned temple.
| 164 | "The Listening Hood"; Transliteration: "Kikimimizukin" (Japanese: 聴き耳頭巾) | May 31, 2015 |
| 164 | "You There, Grandpa?"; Transliteration: "Jīsan orukai" (Japanese: 爺さんおるかい) | May 31, 2015 |
| 164 | "The Carrot, the Burdock, and the Radish"; Transliteration: "Ninjin to gobō to daikon" (Japanese: 人参と牛蒡と大根) | May 31, 2015 |
A man gets a hood which helps him listen to animals. An old man's wife beloved makes him promise to put her dead body in the closet. Vegetables take a bath to get ready to go to heaven.
| 165 | "The Hornless Sazae"; Transliteration: "Tsunonashi sazae" (Japanese: つのなしさざえ) | June 7, 2015 |
| 165 | "The Willowleaf Fish"; Transliteration: "Yanagi no ha no sakana" (Japanese: 柳の葉の魚) | June 7, 2015 |
| 165 | "The High Priest Who Came to the Village"; Transliteration: "Mura ni kita daisōjō-sama" (Japanese: 村に来た大僧正さま) | June 7, 2015 |
A village helps a monk escape the wrath of a feudal lord. A goddess turns leaves into fish to help her people. A high priest comes to the village.
| 166 | "Eat Miso Beans Even if You Have to Go Back Three Leagues"; Transliteration: "Misomame wa sanri modotte mo kue" (Japanese: 味噌豆は三里戻っても食え) | June 14, 2015 |
| 166 | "Netarō of Asa"; Transliteration: "Asa no Netarō" (Japanese: 厚狭の寝太郎) | June 14, 2015 |
| 166 | "Tarō of the Broken Bowl"; Transliteration: "Kakewan Tarō" (Japanese: かけ椀太郎) | June 14, 2015 |
A traveling pair of samurai eat delicious miso beans, which are so good that they travel back three leagues to get more. A boy sleeps for three years and begins to make strange requests. A lazy boy is forced to work in the mountains for three years, and given a broken bowl in exchange.
| 167 | "The Man Who was Faster than a Horse"; Transliteration: "Uma yori mo hayai otoko" (Japanese: 馬よりも速い男) | June 21, 2015 |
| 167 | "The Incredibly Strong Oni Tayuu"; Transliteration: "Kairiki oni Tayū" (Japanese: 怪力鬼太夫) | June 21, 2015 |
| 167 | "The Kappa and the Gourd"; Transliteration: "Kappa to hyōtan" (Japanese: かっぱとひょうたん) | June 21, 2015 |
A man becomes faster than a horse after his mother dies. A sumo wrestler uses divine help to defeat an opponent. A kappa wants to marry a girl in exchange for his help.
| 168 | "Two Young Boys with a Destiny"; Transliteration: "Sadame wo shotta futari no wakamono" (Japanese: さだめを背負った二人の若者) | June 28, 2015 |
| 168 | "Osan the Fox and Yosaburou the Raccoon"; Transliteration: "Osan-gitsune to Yosaburō-tanuki" (Japanese: おさん狐と与三郎狸) | June 28, 2015 |
| 168 | "The Underground Country"; Transliteration: "Chitei no kuni" (Japanese: 地底の国) | June 28, 2015 |
Two boys have a great destiny to fulfill. A fox and a raccoon get in a competition to see who can trick the other. A boy goes deep underground and finds a terrible country of demons.
| 169 | "The Story of the Man Who Was Always in a Hurry"; Transliteration: "Awate-mono no hanashi" (Japanese: あわてものの話) | July 5, 2015 |
| 169 | "The Cat of Unpenji Temple"; Transliteration: "Unpenji no neko" (Japanese: 雲辺寺の猫) | July 5, 2015 |
| 169 | "The Yama-Ori Rich Man"; Transliteration: "Yama-Ori chōja" (Japanese: 山おり長者) | July 5, 2015 |
A man is always in a big hurry. A terrible monster is defeated by a cat. A rich man devises a cunning plan to marry off his daughter.
| 170 | "The Cat's Play"; Transliteration: "Neko no shibai" (Japanese: 猫の芝居) | July 12, 2015 |
| 170 | "Hanbei Daimyoujin"; Transliteration: "Hanbē daimyōjin" (Japanese: 半兵衛大明神) | July 12, 2015 |
| 170 | "The Gourd Kannon"; Transliteration: "Hyōtan Kannon" (Japanese: ヒョウタン観音) | July 12, 2015 |
Cats perform plays late at night. A man is mistaken for a god. A gourd grants all wishes.
| 171 | "We Still Don't Know"; Transliteration: "Māda mada wakaran" (Japanese: まあだまだわからん) | July 19, 2015 |
| 171 | "The Thunder and the Mulberry Tree"; Transliteration: "Kaminari to kuwa no ki" (Japanese: 雷と桑の木) | July 19, 2015 |
| 171 | "Hoichi the Earless (2)"; Transliteration: "Miminashi hōichi" (Japanese: 耳なし芳一) | July 19, 2015 |
A lesson about soba is learned. A lightning god refuses to strike a mulberry tree. The souls of the dead rip off a man's ears (this tale is a renewal).
| 172 | "The Round Priest Statue"; Transliteration: "Mawari jizō" (Japanese: まわり地蔵) | July 26, 2015 |
| 172 | "The Priest Statue That Faced Sideways"; Transliteration: "Yokomuki jizō" (Japanese: 横向き地蔵) | July 26, 2015 |
| 172 | "Inside the Teacup"; Transliteration: "Chawan no naka" (Japanese: 茶碗の中) | July 26, 2015 |
A Priest Statue goes around a village. A Priest Statue turns sideways. An unsettling story about a teacup.
| 173 | "The Bean Stalk and the Heavenly Mansion"; Transliteration: "Mame no tsuri to ten no yakata" (Japanese: 豆のつると天の館) | August 2, 2015 |
| 173 | "Otei's Story"; Transliteration: "Otei no hanashi" (Japanese: お貞のはなし) | August 2, 2015 |
| 173 | "Moyabune"; Transliteration: "Moyabune" (Japanese: もや船) | August 2, 2015 |
A boy climbs a beanstalk to heaven. A man promises to marry his dying wife when she is reborn. The sorrowful souls of dead mothers haunt a mountain for all eternity.
| 174 | "Urashima of Kurobe"; Transliteration: "Kurobe no urashima" (Japanese: 黒部の浦島) | August 9, 2015 |
| 174 | "Yachabou"; Transliteration: "Yachabō" (Japanese: 野茶坊) | August 9, 2015 |
| 174 | "Oshidori"; Transliteration: "Oshidori" (Japanese: おしどり) | August 9, 2015 |
Men make friends with a magic go player. A mischievous boy named Yachabou makes a friend. A man shoots a duck in anger and is visited in the night by its vengeful ghost.
| 175 | "The Cursed Blade that Sank into the Swamp"; Transliteration: "Numa ni shizunda yōtō" (Japanese: 沼に沈んだ妖刀) | August 16, 2015 |
| 175 | "The Plate Mansion of Banchou"; Transliteration: "Banchō saraya shiki" (Japanese: 番町皿屋敷) | August 16, 2015 |
| 175 | "Zensuke, the Badger, and the Kappa"; Transliteration: "Zensuke to mujina to kappa" (Japanese: 善助とムジナとカッパ) | August 16, 2015 |
Every night a cursed katana flies out of its scabbard and kills people. The ghost of a murdered woman counts plates every night. A couple moves next to a lake where animals and monsters live.
| 176 | "The Giant Octopus's Hat"; Transliteration: "Ōtako no bōshi" (Japanese: 大蛸の帽子) | August 23, 2015 |
| 176 | "The Buried Secret"; Transliteration: "Hōmurareta himitsu" (Japanese: 葬られた秘密) | August 23, 2015 |
| 176 | "The Unibrow Raccoon"; Transliteration: "Hitomoji tanuki" (Japanese: 一文字たぬき) | August 23, 2015 |
An Octopus wants a hat. A secret is buried. A raccoon with a unibrow sets a task for a monk.
| 177 | "The Kappa Kid"; Transliteration: "Kappa kozō" (Japanese: カッパ小僧) | August 30, 2015 |
| 177 | "The Priest and the Kid's 'Who Ate It?'"; Transliteration: "Oshō to kozō no kuwan, kutta" (Japanese: 和尚と小僧のくわん、くった) | August 30, 2015 |
| 177 | "The Sparrow and the Woodpecker"; Transliteration: "Suzume to kitsutsuki" (Japanese: 雀とキツツキ) | August 30, 2015 |
A kappa learns to fish. Buddha eats some snacks... or does he? A sparrow and woodpecker visit their dying mother.
| 178 | "Hakke Hachitarō"; Transliteration: "Hakke Hachitarō" (Japanese: はっけ八太郎) | September 6, 2015 |
| 178 | "Ohatsu Kannon"; Transliteration: "Ohatsu Kannon" (Japanese: お初観音) | September 6, 2015 |
| 178 | "The Monster of Red Lake"; Transliteration: "Akaike no bakemono" (Japanese: 赤池の化物) | September 6, 2015 |
A man uses his fortune-telling skills to win a reward. A suspicious man believes rumors that lead to his fiancee's death. An old priest tricks a monster.
| 179 | "Sleep and Wait For Good News"; Transliteration: "Kahōhane temate" (Japanese: 果報は寝て待て) | September 13, 2015 |
| 179 | "The Farting Old Woman"; Transliteration: "He koki baba" (Japanese: 屁こき婆) | September 13, 2015 |
| 179 | "The Black Kite's Egg"; Transliteration: "Tonbi no tamago" (Japanese: とんびの卵) | September 13, 2015 |
A man sleeps and waits for good news. A woman wants to divorce her husband because his mother farts too much. A man marries a snake.
| 180 | "Monster Temple"; Transliteration: "Bakemono-dera" (Japanese: 化物寺) | September 20, 2015 |
| 180 | "Eggplant Grannie"; Transliteration: "Nasubi baba" (Japanese: なすび婆) | September 20, 2015 |
| 180 | "The Tengu's Hidden Cloak (2)"; Transliteration: "Tengu no kakuremino" (Japanese: 天狗のかくれ蓑（みの）) | September 20, 2015 |
A monk goes to a temple for spiritual training. An Eggplant Grannie reportedly shows up at a secluded mountain temple. There was a tengu who used an invisibility cape to pull pranks on people (this tale is a renewal).
| 181 | "Teapot"; Transliteration: "Cha-tsubo" (Japanese: 茶つぼ) | September 27, 2015 |
| 181 | "The Yama-Ori Rich Man"; Transliteration: "Yama-Ori chōja" (Japanese: 山おり長者) | September 27, 2015 |
| 181 | "Tenshiki"; Transliteration: "Tenshiki" (Japanese: 転失気(てんしき)) | September 27, 2015 |
A giant teapot monster haunts an abandoned temple (repeat from episode 163). A rich man devises a cunning plan to marry off his daughter (repeat from episode 169). A priest sends a boy into town to learn about the mysterious "tenshiki" (repeat from episode 162).
| 182 | "Momotarō (3)"; Transliteration: "Momotarō" (Japanese: 桃太郎) | October 4, 2015 |
| 182 | "The Frogs Who Didn't Respect Their Elders"; Transliteration: "Kaeru no oya fukō" (Japanese: 蛙の親不幸) | October 4, 2015 |
| 182 | "The Water of Youth (2)"; Transliteration: "Wakagaeri no mizu" (Japanese: 若返りの水) | October 4, 2015 |
A boy travels with some animals (this tale is a second renewal), a frogs croak is explained, and the fountain of youth is found (this tale is a renewal).
| 183 | "The Old Man and His Bump (3)"; Transliteration: "Kobutori jīsan" (Japanese: こぶとり爺さん) | October 11, 2015 |
| 183 | "Buzz! Buzz! Serve Sake!"; Transliteration: "Bunbun shaku ni sase" (Japanese: ぶんぶん杓にさせ) | October 11, 2015 |
| 183 | "The Hammer's Handle"; Transliteration: "Kozuchi no gara" (Japanese: 小槌の柄) | October 11, 2015 |
An old man has a bump (this tale is a second renewal). A lazy man wants a life of ease. The God of Wealth's hammer is missing its handle.
| 184 | "Kintarō (3)"; Transliteration: "Kintarō" (Japanese: 金太郎) | October 18, 2015 |
| 184 | "The Lightning God's Handprint"; Transliteration: "Kaminari no tegata" (Japanese: 雷のてがた) | October 18, 2015 |
| 184 | "The Master of Lying"; Transliteration: "Usotsuki meijin" (Japanese: ウソつき名人) | October 18, 2015 |
A boy named Kintarō wrestles a bear (this tale is a second renewal). A thunder god is taught a lesson. A master liar deceives people.
| 185 | "The Teapot Raccoon Dog (2)"; Transliteration: "Bunbuku chagama" (Japanese: ぶんぶく茶釜) | October 25, 2015 |
| 185 | "The Difficult Marriage Question"; Transliteration: "Mukoiri no nanmon" (Japanese: 婿入りの難問) | October 25, 2015 |
| 185 | "Three Merchants"; Transliteration: "Sannin no shōnin" (Japanese: 三人の商人) | October 25, 2015 |
A teapot holds a dark secret (this tale is a renewal). A man solves a complicated riddle. A complex pun involving tea and sieves.
| 186 | "The Rolling Rice Ball (3)"; Transliteration: "Omusubi kororin" (Japanese: おむすびころりん) | November 1, 2015 |
| 186 | "The Demon's Bath"; Transliteration: "Oni no yu" (Japanese: 鬼の湯) | November 1, 2015 |
| 186 | "Head Lake (2)"; Transliteration: "Atama ga ike" (Japanese: 頭が池) | November 1, 2015 |
Rice balls roll (this tale is a second renewal). A monster lurks in a hot springs. A man's head becomes a lake (this tale is a renewal).
| 187 | "Urashima Tarō (3)"; Transliteration: "Urashimatarō" (Japanese: 浦島太郎) | November 8, 2015 |
| 187 | "The Crane's Gift"; Transliteration: "Tsuru no omiyage" (Japanese: つるのおみやげ) | November 8, 2015 |
| 187 | "Gosuke-don's Business"; Transliteration: "Gosuke-don no shōbai" (Japanese: 五助どんの商売) | November 8, 2015 |
A man goes to an undersea palace (this tale is a second renewal). A crane leaves his poop as a present. Gosuke makes money in an unusual way.
| 188 | "Little One Inch (3)"; Transliteration: "Issun-bōshi" (Japanese: 一寸法師) | November 15, 2015 |
| 188 | "The Wind God and the Children (2)"; Transliteration: "Kaze no kami to kodomo-tachi" (Japanese: 風の神と子供たち) | November 15, 2015 |
| 188 | "The Lord Goes Thumpity-Thud"; Transliteration: "Sutton korori no wo tonosama" (Japanese: すっとんころりのおとの様) | November 15, 2015 |
A small boy fights a demon (this tale is a second renewal). The wind god takes children to a mystical land (this tale is a renewal). A lord goes thumpity-thump.
| 189 | "The Three Charms (2)"; Transliteration: "Sanmai no O-fuda" (Japanese: 三枚のお札) | November 22, 2015 |
| 189 | "Saruya's Rock"; Transliteration: "Saruya no ishi" (Japanese: さるやの石) | November 22, 2015 |
| 189 | "The Mouse Takes a Groom (2)"; Transliteration: "Nezumi no mukodono" (Japanese: ねずみの婿取り) | November 22, 2015 |
Three talismans protect a boy (this tale is a renewal). A monkey throws rocks. A rat finds a husband for his daughter (this tale is a renewal).
| 190 | "Princess Kaguya (3)"; Transliteration: "Kaguya-hime" (Japanese: かぐや姫) | November 29, 2015 |
| 190 | "Princess Hachikatsugi (2)"; Transliteration: "Hachikatsugi-hime" (Japanese: はちかつぎ姫) | November 29, 2015 |
| 190 | "Princess Kaminaga"; Transliteration: "Kaminaga-hime" (Japanese: 髪長姫) | November 29, 2015 |
It's princess week on Folktales from Japan! A princess returns to the moon (this tale is a second renewal). A princess has a bowl on her head (this tale is a renewal). A princess has no hair.
| 191 | "Monkey and Crab (3)"; Transliteration: "Saru kani" (Japanese: さるかに) | December 6, 2015 |
| 191 | "Cow Demon"; Transliteration: "Ushi oni" (Japanese: 牛鬼) | December 6, 2015 |
| 191 | "The Boundary Between the Northern and Southern Villages"; Transliteration: "Hoppō to nanpō no mura zakai" (Japanese: 北方と南方の村ざかい) | December 6, 2015 |
A crab seeks revenge on a monkey (this tale is a second renewal). A demon devours shadows. A boundary is lost.
| 192 | "The Old Man Who Made the Dead Trees Blossom (3)"; Transliteration: "Hanasaka jīsan" (Japanese: 花さか爺さん) | December 13, 2015 |
| 192 | "Umi Bouzu"; Transliteration: "Umi bōzu" (Japanese: 海坊主) | December 13, 2015 |
| 192 | "Comparing Transformations"; Transliteration: "Bake kurabe" (Japanese: 化けくらべ) | December 13, 2015 |
An old man makes flowers bloom (this tale is a second renewal). A lazy man is visited by a sea monster. Two foxes compare their disguises.
| 193 | "The Crane Repays a Debt (3)"; Transliteration: "Tsuru no Ongaeshi" (Japanese: 鶴の恩返し) | December 20, 2015 |
| 193 | "Chinchin Kobakama"; Transliteration: "Chinchin kobakama" (Japanese: ちんちん小袴) | December 20, 2015 |
| 193 | "The Monster and the Mountain Grannie"; Transliteration: "Bakemono to yamanba" (Japanese: 化けものと山んば) | December 20, 2015 |
A crane repays a debt (this tale is a second renewal). A lazy woman is visited by terrible ghosts. A monster and a mountain granny terrorize a village.
| 194 | "The Jizou Statue With the Hat (3)"; Transliteration: "Kasa jizō" (Japanese: 笠地蔵) | December 27, 2015 |
| 194 | "The Great Year's Fire"; Transliteration: "Daitoshi no hi" (Japanese: 大年の火) | December 27, 2015 |
| 194 | "The Snow Woman (2)"; Transliteration: "Yukion'na" (Japanese: 雪女) | December 27, 2015 |
On New Year's Eve, a poor couple struggles to bring in the new year (this tale is a second renewal). A woman is told not to let the fire go out on New Year's Eve, but... Minokichi and Mokichi take shelter from the blizzard, when a mysterious woman appears before them (this tale is a renewal).
| 195 | "The Man Who Bought a Dream (2)"; Transliteration: "Yume wo katta otoko" (Japanese: 夢を買った男) | January 3, 2016 |
| 195 | "The Badger of Eagle Mountain"; Transliteration: "Washiyama no mujina" (Japanese: 鷲山のむじな) | January 3, 2016 |
| 195 | "Ishibumi-sama Heals Illness"; Transliteration: "Byōki wo naosu Ishibumi-sama" (Japanese: 病気をなおす石ぶみ様) | January 3, 2016 |
A man buys a dream that lead to wealth (this tale is a renewal). A badger longs for a mother's warmth. A god promises health if people will stop tripping over his head.
| 196 | "Potato Rolling (2)"; Transliteration: "Imo korogashi" (Japanese: いもころがし) | January 10, 2016 |
| 196 | "The Gama Frog's Oil"; Transliteration: "Gama-gaeru no abura" (Japanese: ガマガエルの油) | January 10, 2016 |
| 196 | "The Arasaka Rich Man"; Transliteration: "Arasaka chōja" (Japanese: 荒坂長者) | January 10, 2016 |
Yams are rolled, mistakenly (this tale is a renewal). A toad's oil cures wounds. A greedy man pleads for mercy from the sun.
| 197 | "The Rat Sutra (2)"; Transliteration: "Nezumi kyō" (Japanese: ねずみ経) | January 17, 2016 |
| 197 | "The Great Snake of Gondayuu Lake"; Transliteration: "Gondayū-chi no orochi" (Japanese: 権太夫池の大蛇) | January 17, 2016 |
| 197 | "A Tale of Yomeda"; Transliteration: "Yomeda no hanashi" (Japanese: 嫁田のはなし) | January 17, 2016 |
The Rat Sutra scares off a thief (this tale is a renewal). A snake is struck down by the gods. A wife sacrifices her life to the gods to finish the harvest.
| 198 | "The Fire Man (2)"; Transliteration: "Hyottoko" (Japanese: 火男) | January 24, 2016 |
| 198 | "Shouninbaru"; Transliteration: "Shōninbaru" (Japanese: 上人原（しょうにんばる）) | January 24, 2016 |
| 198 | "Deetarabotchi"; Transliteration: "Deetarabotchi" (Japanese: でえたらぼっち) | January 24, 2016 |
A fire man brings gold (this tale is a renewal). A priest sacrifices himself to bring the rain. A man carries a mountain.
| 199 | "The Ear Priest Statue (2)"; Transliteration: "Mimi jizō" (Japanese: 耳地蔵) | January 31, 2016 |
| 199 | "The Cow That Dove into Tega Swamp"; Transliteration: "Tega-numa ni mogutta ushi" (Japanese: 手賀沼にもぐった牛) | January 31, 2016 |
| 199 | "The Man Who Cut Reeds"; Transliteration: "Ashi wo karu otto" (Japanese: 葦を刈る夫) | January 31, 2016 |
A priest statue heals hearing (this tale is a renewal). A cow goes into a swamp. A man cuts reeds.
| 200 | "The Ghost Who Raised a Child"; Transliteration: "Kosodate yūrei" (Japanese: 子育て幽霊) | February 7, 2016 |
| 200 | "Oman Cherry Blossoms"; Transliteration: "Oman sakura" (Japanese: おまん桜) | February 7, 2016 |
| 200 | "The Oso Fox and the Blacksmith"; Transliteration: "Osono-kitsune to kajiya" (Japanese: おその狐と鍛冶屋) | February 7, 2016 |
A ghost raises a child. A man freezes in the snow while he waits for his love. A fox plays tricks.
| 201 | "The Wife Who Wouldn't Eat (2)"; Transliteration: "Kuwazu nyōbō" (Japanese: 食わず女房) | February 14, 2016 |
| 201 | "Yawn Achoo Poot"; Transliteration: "Ā hakushon pū" (Japanese: ああ はくしょん プー) | February 14, 2016 |
| 201 | "The Ushi no Koku Mairi"; Transliteration: "Ushi no koku mairi" (Japanese: 丑の刻参り) | February 14, 2016 |
A wife eats nothing... except her husband (this tale is a renewal). Three losers defeat the lord of hell. A woman prays to survive a plague.
| 202 | "The Sparrow With the Severed Tongue (2)"; Transliteration: "Shita-kiri Suzume" (Japanese: 舌切り雀) | February 21, 2016 |
| 202 | "The Dream of the Mortar Seller"; Transliteration: "Suribachi uri no yume" (Japanese: すり鉢売りの夢) | February 21, 2016 |
| 202 | "The Fox Wife"; Transliteration: "Kitsune nyōbō" (Japanese: キツネ女房) | February 21, 2016 |
A sparrow's tongue is severed (this tale is a renewal). A mortar seller has a dream. A man marries a fox.
| 203 | "The Furuya Forest (2)"; Transliteration: "Furuya no mori" (Japanese: ふるやのもり) | February 28, 2016 |
| 203 | "The Tengu and the Potato"; Transliteration: "Tengu to jagaimo" (Japanese: 天狗とじゃがいも) | February 28, 2016 |
| 203 | "The Kakegoro of Kanne and the Princess"; Transliteration: "Kan-emon to Ohime-sama no Kakegoro" (Japanese: 勘右衛門とお姫様のかけごろ) | February 28, 2016 |
A wolf encounters the most terrifying thing in the world (this tale is a renewal). A tengu plays tricks with potatoes. Kanne and his merry band race a princess.
| 204 | "The Village of the Nightingales (2)"; Transliteration: "Uguisu no sato" (Japanese: うぐいすの里) | March 6, 2016 |
| 204 | "The Rich Man and Gatarō"; Transliteration: "Chōja to Gatarō" (Japanese: 長者と河太郎) | March 6, 2016 |
| 204 | "The Soul that Went Into a Different Girl"; Transliteration: "Betsu no musume ni haitta tamashī" (Japanese: 別の娘に入った魂) | March 6, 2016 |
A woman entrusts a man with a mysterious mansion (this tale is a renewal). A rich man makes a deal with a kappa to make a bridge. A girl's soul enters another's body.
| 205 | "Zashiki-Warashi (2)"; Transliteration: "Zashiki-Warashi" (Japanese: 座敷わらし) | March 13, 2016 |
| 205 | "The Lazy Husband and the Nagging Wife"; Transliteration: "Gūtara teishu to gamigami nyōbō" (Japanese: ぐうたら亭主とガミガミ女房) | March 13, 2016 |
| 205 | "The Peach and the Red Demon"; Transliteration: "Momo to akaoni" (Japanese: 桃と赤鬼) | March 13, 2016 |
A Zashiki-Warashi brings joy to a household (this tale is a renewal). A lazy husband has a nagging wife. A red demon fears peaches.
| 206 | "Watermelon Princess"; Transliteration: "Uriko-hime" (Japanese: 瓜子姫) | March 20, 2016 |
| 206 | "The Former Dog (2)"; Transliteration: "Moto inu" (Japanese: 元犬) | March 20, 2016 |
| 206 | "The Shocked Daikon Radish"; Transliteration: "Daikon no bikkuri gyōten" (Japanese: 大根のびっくりぎょうてん) | March 20, 2016 |
A girl is born from a watermelon and then tricked by a demon. A dog becomes a man (this tale is a renewal). A radish is shocked and amazed.
| 207 | "Chinchin Kobakama"; Transliteration: "Chinchin kobakama" (Japanese: ちんちん小袴) | March 27, 2016 |
| 207 | "Saruya's Rock"; Transliteration: "Saruya no ishi" (Japanese: さるやの石) | March 27, 2016 |
| 207 | "The Badger of Eagle Mountain"; Transliteration: "Washiyama no mujina" (Japanese: 鷲山のむじな) | March 27, 2016 |
A lazy woman is visited by terrible ghosts (repeat from episode 193). A monkey throws rocks (repeat from episode 189). A badger longs for a mother's warmth (repeat from episode 195).
| 208 | "Momotarō (4)"; Transliteration: "Momotarō" (Japanese: 桃太郎) | April 3, 2016 |
| 208 | "The Buckwheat Dumpling Priest"; Transliteration: "Sobagaki oshō" (Japanese: そばがき和尚) | April 3, 2016 |
| 208 | "The Nose and Morning Porridge"; Transliteration: "Hana to chōshuku" (Japanese: 鼻と朝粥) | April 3, 2016 |
Momotarō fights demons with his animal friends (this tale is a third renewal). A wise priest heals illness in exchange for buckwheat. A priest has a disgusting nose.
| 209 | "The Pond Snail Rich Man (2)"; Transliteration: "Tanishi chōja" (Japanese: たにし長者) | April 10, 2016 |
| 209 | "Yaobikuni"; Transliteration: "Yaobikuni" (Japanese: 八百比丘尼) | April 10, 2016 |
| 209 | "The Child of the Giant Snake"; Transliteration: "Daija no ko" (Japanese: 大蛇の子) | April 10, 2016 |
A pond snail becomes rich (this tale is a renewal). A girl opens a box that she should never have opened. A giant snake has a child.
| 210 | "The Transforming Hood (2)"; Transliteration: "Yatsubake zukin" (Japanese: 八つ化け頭巾) | April 17, 2016 |
| 210 | "Even The Sardine's Head Begins with Faith"; Transliteration: "Iwashi no atama mo shinjin kara" (Japanese: いわしの頭も信心から) | April 17, 2016 |
| 210 | "Onisuke and Hikoshichi"; Transliteration: "Onisuke to Hikoshichi" (Japanese: 鬼助と彦七) | April 17, 2016 |
A fox is outwitted by a man who wants to be a girl (this tale is a renewal). A sardine's head is a sign of faith. Two strong men compete all the time.
| 211 | "Shippeitaro (2)"; Transliteration: "Shippeitarō" (Japanese: しっぺい太郎) | April 24, 2016 |
| 211 | "A Field of Rape Blossoms That Bloomed Overnight"; Transliteration: "Ichiya de saita nanohana hatake" (Japanese: 一夜で咲いた菜の花畑) | April 24, 2016 |
| 211 | "The Light on the Buddha's Forehead"; Transliteration: "Hotoke-sama no hitai no hikari" (Japanese: 仏さまのひたいの光) | April 24, 2016 |
A monk saves a girl from an evil monster (this tale is a renewal). Flowers hide logs. The buddha's forehead shines.
| 212 | "The Cow's Marriage (2)"; Transliteration: "Ushi no yomeiri" (Japanese: 牛の嫁入り) | May 1, 2016 |
| 212 | "Shibahama (2)"; Transliteration: "Shibahama" (Japanese: 芝浜) | May 1, 2016 |
| 212 | "The Ocelot and the Priest"; Transliteration: "Toraneko to obōsan" (Japanese: 虎猫とお坊さん) | May 1, 2016 |
A man marries a cow (this tale is a renewal). Gold coins are found and lost (this tale is a renewal). A priest becomes friends with angry ocelots at a temple.
| 213 | "Ushiwakamaru (2)"; Transliteration: "Ushiwakamaru" (Japanese: 牛若丸) | May 8, 2016 |
| 213 | "The Demon Granny of Adachigahara"; Transliteration: "Adachigahara no onibaba" (Japanese: 安達ヶ原の鬼婆) | May 8, 2016 |
| 213 | "The Days Pass So Fast (2)"; Transliteration: "Tsukihi no tatsu no wa hayai" (Japanese: 月日のたつのは早い) | May 8, 2016 |
A young samurai seeks revenge (this tale is a renewal). A demon granny stalks the plains of Adachigahara. The sun and moon take a trip down to see the lower world (this tale is a renewal).
| 214 | "The White Rabbit of Inaba (2)"; Transliteration: "Inaba no shiro-usagi" (Japanese: 因幡の白兎) | May 15, 2016 |
| 214 | "The Giant, Strange-Colored Deer"; Transliteration: "Kushiki iro no ōshika" (Japanese: 奇しき色の大鹿) | May 15, 2016 |
| 214 | "The Jewel of Sangosu"; Transliteration: "Sangosu no tama" (Japanese: サンゴスの玉) | May 15, 2016 |
A god's love of his fellow creatures is tested (this tale is a renewal). A strange-colored deer holds the key to a cure. A priest demands the return of a jewel.
| 215 | "The Pond Snail Sisters"; Transliteration: "Tanishi no shimai" (Japanese: たにしの姉妹) | May 22, 2016 |
| 215 | "The White Snake's Daughter"; Transliteration: "Shirohebi no musume" (Japanese: 白蛇の娘) | May 22, 2016 |
| 215 | "Blue Tengu and Red Tengu"; Transliteration: "Aotengu to akatengu" (Japanese: 青天狗と赤天狗) | May 22, 2016 |
A white snake becomes a daughter. Two snails cook dinner for a pair of brothers. A blue tengu and a red tengu get in a fight.
| 216 | "The Cat from the Dragon Palace"; Transliteration: "Ryūgū kara kita neko" (Japanese: 竜宮から来た猫) | May 29, 2016 |
| 216 | "The Sashisaba and the Tsurushigaki"; Transliteration: "Sashisaba to tsurushigaki" (Japanese: さしさばとつるし柿) | May 29, 2016 |
| 216 | "The Fart-Seller"; Transliteration: "Onara uri" (Japanese: おなら売り) | May 29, 2016 |
A cat from Ryuuguu Palace brings wealth. A greedy man freezes as he eats all the persimmons. A man sells farts that are sacred to the Buddha.
| 217 | "The Monkey's Groom (2)"; Transliteration: "Saru no mukodono" (Japanese: 猿の婿どの) | June 5, 2016 |
| 217 | "Otojo's Fire"; Transliteration: "Otojō no hi" (Japanese: オト女の火) | June 5, 2016 |
| 217 | "The Oil Seller and the Fox"; Transliteration: "Aburauri to kitsune" (Japanese: あぶら売りときつね) | June 5, 2016 |
A girl tricks a monkey out of marriage (this tale is a renewal). A woman devours the legs of an octopus. An oil seller is tricked by a fox.
| 218 | "Monogusatarō (2)"; Transliteration: "Monogusatarō" (Japanese: ものぐさ太郎) | June 12, 2016 |
| 218 | "The Flute of the Moonlit Night"; Transliteration: "Tsukiyo no fue" (Japanese: 月夜の笛) | June 12, 2016 |
| 218 | "Shrimp and Crow"; Transliteration: "Ebi to karasu" (Japanese: エビとカラス) | June 12, 2016 |
The world's laziest man goes to Kyoto (this tale is a renewal). A flute is played on a moonlit night. A monk draws magic shrimp.
| 219 | "Umisachihiko and Yamasachihiko (2)"; Transliteration: "Umisachihiko to Yamasachihiko" (Japanese: 海幸彦と山幸彦) | June 19, 2016 |
| 219 | "The Stupid Groom and the Crab Loincloth"; Transliteration: "Oroka muko to kani no fundoshi" (Japanese: 愚か婿と蟹のふんどし) | June 19, 2016 |
| 219 | "The Demons Who Passed Through Demon Pass"; Transliteration: "Onigoe wo tōtta onitachi" (Japanese: 鬼越を通った鬼たち) | June 19, 2016 |
A fishing hook is lost, then found (this tale is a renewal). A man does not understand the proper etiquette for eating crab. A blue oni and a red oni fight for the love of a goddess.
| 220 | "Niō and Dokkoi (2)"; Transliteration: "Niō to Dokkoi" (Japanese: 仁王とどっこい) | June 26, 2016 |
| 220 | "Cowbear-sama"; Transliteration: "Ushikuma-sama" (Japanese: 牛熊様) | June 26, 2016 |
| 220 | "Yashagaike"; Transliteration: "Yashagaike" (Japanese: 夜叉が池) | June 26, 2016 |
Two large men fight each other to see who is the strongest (this tale is a renewal). A human intervenes in a duel between cow and bear. A girl marries a snake.
| 221 | "Orihime and Hikoboshi (2)"; Transliteration: "Orihime to Hikoboshi" (Japanese: 織姫と彦星) | July 3, 2016 |
| 221 | "The Mercy of the Priest Statue"; Transliteration: "Ojizō-sama no ojihi" (Japanese: お地蔵さまのおじひ) | July 3, 2016 |
| 221 | "Yatsuhashi"; Transliteration: "Yatsuhashi" (Japanese: 八橋) | July 3, 2016 |
Orihime and Hikoboshi fall in love, but neglect their duties. They are separated eternally by the milky way (this tale is a renewal). A woman is tricked by an evil mother and dies in a swamp, but she wasn't what she appeared to be. A woman's sons drown in a river, and she builds eight bridges to commemorate their deaths.
| 222 | "The Oyster Mushroom at the Bottom of the Valley"; Transliteration: "Tanizoko no hiratake" (Japanese: 谷底の平茸) | July 10, 2016 |
| 222 | "The Bride's Present"; Transliteration: "Yomesan no miyage" (Japanese: 嫁さんのみやげ) | July 10, 2016 |
| 222 | "The Tree Peony and the Rat"; Transliteration: "Botan no hana to nezumi" (Japanese: 牡丹の花とねずみ) | July 10, 2016 |
A lord picks mushrooms. A wife is embarrassed at her family's meager presents. Two sculptors compete to see who is the best, but one cheats.
| 223 | "The Story of the Tengu on Dainichiyama"; Transliteration: "Dainichiyama no tengu no hanashi" (Japanese: 大日山の天狗の話) | July 17, 2016 |
| 223 | "The Fox's Gift"; Transliteration: "Kitsune no okurimono" (Japanese: きつねの贈り物) | July 17, 2016 |
| 223 | "The Child that was Kidnapped by an Eagle (2)"; Transliteration: "Washi no sarai ko" (Japanese: 鷲のさらい子) | July 17, 2016 |
A tengu from Dainichiyama finds a human mother. A fox gives a man a gift in exchange for not being shot. A mother is reunited with a lost child which was kidnapped by an eagle (this tale is a renewal).
| 224 | "The Boy and the Fox"; Transliteration: "Kozō to kitsune" (Japanese: 小僧と狐) | July 24, 2016 |
| 224 | "One Piece of Kannon's Thigh-Meat"; Transliteration: "Kannon-sama no kata momoniku" (Japanese: 観音さまの片もも肉) | July 24, 2016 |
| 224 | "The Gonzo Bug (2)"; Transliteration: "Gonzō mushi" (Japanese: ごんぞう虫) | July 24, 2016 |
A priest is tricked by a fox, who is then tricked by a kid. A priest eats meat from the thigh of his goddess. A stingy man becomes a bug (this tale is a renewal).
| 225 | "Left Behind (2)"; Transliteration: "Oitekebori" (Japanese: おいてけ堀) | July 31, 2016 |
| 225 | "The Flying Man and His Flying Journey"; Transliteration: "Tonda otoko no tonda tabi" (Japanese: 飛んだ男の飛んだ旅) | July 31, 2016 |
| 225 | "Otogirisō"; Transliteration: "Otogirisō" (Japanese: 弟切草) | July 31, 2016 |
A man is haunted by a ghost who wants him to leave his fish (this tale is a renewal). A flying man goes on a flying journey. A greedy man repents of his attack on his brother.
| 226 | "Yotsuya Ghost Story"; Transliteration: "Yotsuya kaidan" (Japanese: 四谷怪談) | August 6, 2016 |
| 226 | "The Inn in the Grave"; Transliteration: "Hakāna no yado" (Japanese: 墓穴の宿) | August 6, 2016 |
| 226 | "Paradise Thief (2)"; Transliteration: "Gokuraku dorobō" (Japanese: 極楽泥棒) | August 6, 2016 |
A deceitful and murderous husband meets a terrifying end. A man seeks refuge in a grave and fools a robber. A thief thinks he's been killed and sent to paradise (this tale is a renewal).
| 227 | "The Dead Wife's Evil Spirit"; Transliteration: "Shinda tsuma no akuryō" (Japanese: 死んだ妻の悪霊) | August 13, 2016 |
| 227 | "Nursemaid Cherry Blossoms"; Transliteration: "Ubazakura" (Japanese: 乳母ざくら) | August 13, 2016 |
| 227 | "The Snake Samurai"; Transliteration: "Hebizamurai" (Japanese: へび侍) | August 13, 2016 |
An abandoned wife seeks revenge. A nursemaid sacrifices her life for her charge. A snake demands to marry a girl.
| 228 | "The Box of Jealousy"; Transliteration: "Shitto no hako" (Japanese: 嫉妬の箱) | August 21, 2016 |
| 228 | "The Mirror and the Bell"; Transliteration: "Kagami to kane" (Japanese: 鏡と鐘) | August 21, 2016 |
| 228 | "The Cat's Teacup (2)"; Transliteration: "Neko no chawan" (Japanese: ねこの茶碗) | August 21, 2016 |
A woman opens a box and meets a terrible fate. A wife seeks revenge for her lost mirror. A merchant tries to con a man out of a rare dish, but is conned instead (this tale is a renewal).
| 229 | "The Broken Promise"; Transliteration: "Yaburareta yakusoku" (Japanese: 破られた約束) | August 28, 2016 |
| 229 | "The Story of the Green Willow"; Transliteration: "Aoyagi no hanashi" (Japanese: 青柳のはなし) | August 28, 2016 |
| 229 | "King Enma is Hachigoro-don (2)"; Transliteration: "Enma-sama wa hachigorō-don" (Japanese: 閻魔さまはハチゴロどん) | August 28, 2016 |
A promise is broken and a life is taken. A man marries a green willow. The lord of hell is tricked out of his job by a sneaky thief (this tale is a renewal).
| 230 | "Magoshirōbuchi"; Transliteration: "Magoshirōbuchi" (Japanese: 孫四郎淵) | September 4, 2016 |
| 230 | "The Zuitan Priest Statue"; Transliteration: "Zuitan jizō" (Japanese: ずいたん地蔵) | September 4, 2016 |
| 230 | "The Tale of Kotohime"; Transliteration: "Kotohime monogatari" (Japanese: 琴姫物語) | September 4, 2016 |
A magic dagger saves a man from a snake. A priest statue cures asthma. A beach plays a mysterious melody.
| 231 | "Careless Sokurō (2)"; Transliteration: "Sosō no Sōkurō" (Japanese: そそうの相九郎) | September 11, 2016 |
| 231 | "The Decapitated Priest Statue"; Transliteration: "Kubikiri jizō" (Japanese: 首切り地蔵) | September 11, 2016 |
| 231 | "Genji and the Hood"; Transliteration: "Genji to zukin" (Japanese: 源次と頭巾) | September 11, 2016 |
A careless man meets his double (this tale is a renewal). A beheaded priest statue saves a life. A bully loses a hood and is tormented by terrible visions.
| 232 | "The Man Who Saw His Own Funeral"; Transliteration: "Jibun no sōshiki wo mita otoko" (Japanese: 自分の葬式を見た男) | September 18, 2016 |
| 232 | "Ghost Road"; Transliteration: "Yūreikaidō" (Japanese: 幽霊街道) | September 18, 2016 |
| 232 | "Kissaku's Fall"; Transliteration: "Kissaku otoshi" (Japanese: 吉作落とし) | September 18, 2016 |
A man witnesses his own funeral. A road is haunted by the spirits of the dead. An overconfident climber takes a terrible fall.
| 233 | "Shippeitaro (2)"; Transliteration: "Shippeitarō" (Japanese: しっぺい太郎) | September 25, 2016 |
| 233 | "The Demon Granny of Adachigahara"; Transliteration: "Adachigahara no onibaba" (Japanese: 安達ヶ原の鬼婆) | September 25, 2016 |
| 233 | "Otojo's Fire"; Transliteration: "Otojō no hi" (Japanese: オト女の火) | September 25, 2016 |
A monk saves a girl from an evil monster (repeat from episode 211). A demon granny stalks the plains of Adachigahara (repeat from episode 213). A woman devours the legs of an octopus (repeat from episode 217).
| 234 | "The Fish Wife (2)"; Transliteration: "Uo Nyōbō" (Japanese: 魚女房) | October 2, 2016 |
| 234 | "Obusaritee"; Transliteration: "Obusaritē" (Japanese: おぶさりてぇ) | October 2, 2016 |
| 234 | "The Fox Kid of Ankokuji"; Transliteration: "Ankokuji no kitsune kozō" (Japanese: 安国寺のきつね小僧) | October 2, 2016 |
A man abuses his wife, who is a fish, and lives to regret it (this tale is a renewal). A monster wants to be carried on someone's back. A fox at Ankokuji wants to learn the ways of the buddha.
| 235 | "Meguro's Saury (2)"; Transliteration: "Meguro no sanma" (Japanese: 目黒のさんま) | October 9, 2016 |
| 235 | "Kappa Dokkuri"; Transliteration: "Kappa Dokkuri" (Japanese: 河童徳利) | October 9, 2016 |
| 235 | "The Giant Carp that Sank A Boat"; Transliteration: "Fune wo shizumeta ōgoi" (Japanese: 舟を沈めた大鯉) | October 9, 2016 |
A lord discovers a new favorite fish (this tale is a renewal). A man is given a bottomless pitcher of sake that almost ruins his life. A giant carp sinks a boat.
| 236 | "The Ginger Wife (2)"; Transliteration: "Myōga nyōbō" (Japanese: 茗荷女房) | October 16, 2016 |
| 236 | "The Raccoon's Spinning Wheel (2)"; Transliteration: "Tanuki no itoguruma" (Japanese: たぬきの糸車) | October 16, 2016 |
| 236 | "The Fox Gives Birth (2)"; Transliteration: "Kitsune no O-san" (Japanese: 狐のお産) | October 16, 2016 |
A wife plots with ginger (this tale is a renewal). A raccoon learns to use a spinning wheel (this tale is a renewal). A doctor assists in the birth of a fox (this tale is a renewal).
| 237 | "The Extending Head (2)"; Transliteration: "Rokurokubi" (Japanese: ろくろ首) | October 23, 2016 |
| 237 | "Rat Sumo (2)"; Transliteration: "Nezumi no sumō" (Japanese: ねずみのすもう) | October 23, 2016 |
| 237 | "Oshira-sama (2)"; Transliteration: "Oshira-sama" (Japanese: おしら-様) | October 23, 2016 |
A man marries a woman whose head grows in length (this tale is a renewal). Rats play sumo (this tale is a renewal). A dad grows jealous of his daughter's friendship with a horse (this tale is a renewal).
| 238 | "Blessings of Heaven and Earth (2)"; Transliteration: "Tenpuku chifuku" (Japanese: 天福地福) | October 30, 2016 |
| 238 | "Daikoku Buys Salt"; Transliteration: "Shiokai Daikoku" (Japanese: 塩買い大黒) | October 30, 2016 |
| 238 | "Fujiwara Village"; Transliteration: "Fujiwara-mura" (Japanese: 藤原村) | October 30, 2016 |
Heaven and Earth bring their blessings (this tale is a renewal). Daikoku buys salt. A hidden village is discovered.
| 239 | "Takohachi the Rich Man (2)"; Transliteration: "Takohachi chōja" (Japanese: 蛸八長者) | November 6, 2016 |
| 239 | "Bunshichi mottoi" Transliteration: "Bunshichi mottoi" (Japanese: 文七元結) | November 6, 2016 |
| 239 | "The Oryuu Willow (2)"; Transliteration: "Oryūyanagi" (Japanese: おりゅう柳) | November 6, 2016 |
Takohachi is mistaken for a rich man (this tale is a renewal). A man's generosity spares another man's life. A man marries the spirit of the willow tree outside his house (this tale is a renewal).
| 240 | "Yamata no Orochi (2)"; Transliteration: "Yamata no Orochi" (Japanese: ヤマタノオロチ) | November 13, 2016 |
| 240 | "Lake Moon"; Transliteration: "Ikezuki" (Japanese: 池月) | November 13, 2016 |
| 240 | "The Demon and the Chinese Yam"; Transliteration: "Oni to nagaimo" (Japanese: 鬼と長芋) | November 13, 2016 |
A god duels an eight-headed snake (this tale is a renewal). A horse is taken from its mother at a lake. A demon confronts the horror of yam-eating peasants.
| 241 | "The Three Talismans (2)"; Transliteration: "Sanmai no O-fuda" (Japanese: 三枚のお札) | November 20, 2016 |
| 241 | "Biwakuuna"; Transliteration: "Biwakūna" (Japanese: ビワクウナ) | November 20, 2016 |
| 241 | "A Treasure Entrusted"; Transliteration: "Azuketa takara" (Japanese: あずけた宝) | November 20, 2016 |
Three talismans save a boy from a Mountain Grannie (this tale is a renewal). A monster cat breeds poisonous fruit. A treasure entrusted is restored.
| 242 | "The Kappa of Ise"; Transliteration: "O-Ise no Kappa" (Japanese: おいせのかっぱ) | November 27, 2016 |
| 242 | "The Centipede Gets a Doctor"; Transliteration: "Mukade no isha mukae" (Japanese: むかでの医者むかえ) | November 27, 2016 |
| 242 | "The Rich Man Who Became a Monkey"; Transliteration: "Saru ni natta kanemochi" (Japanese: サルになった金もち) | November 27, 2016 |
A kappa becomes friends with a boy. A centipede goes to et a doctor. A rich man is transformed into a monkey.
| 243 | "Karoku and the Crane"; Transliteration: "Karoku to tsuru" (Japanese: 嘉六と鶴) | December 4, 2016 |
| 243 | "The Shiranui Pine"; Transliteration: "Shiranui no matsu" (Japanese: 不知火の松) | December 4, 2016 |
| 243 | "Gohachi is Kidnapped by a Tengu"; Transliteration: "Tengu ni sarawareta Gohachi" (Japanese: 天狗にさらわれた吾八) | December 4, 2016 |
A kind man marries a crane who weaves on his loom. A man goes out to fish on a stormy day and doesn't come back. Gohachi sumo wrestles a tengu.
| 244 | "Strong Tarō (3)"; Transliteration: "Chikaratarō" (Japanese: 力太郎) | December 11, 2016 |
| 244 | "The Son with the Most Filial Piety in the Village"; Transliteration: "Mura ichiban no kōkō musuko" (Japanese: 村いちばんの孝行息子) | December 11, 2016 |
| 244 | "The Bong-Bong Sharks"; Transliteration: "Bonbon zame" (Japanese: ぼんぼんザメ) | December 11, 2016 |
A strong boy goes on a journey (this tale is a second renewal). The man with the most filial piety in the village is found. Sharks bang against bells.
| 245 | "The Snow Woman (3)"; Transliteration: "Yukion'na" (Japanese: 雪女) | December 18, 2016 |
| 245 | "The Geta Given by a Tengu"; Transliteration: "Tengu ni moratta geta" (Japanese: てんぐにもらったげた) | December 18, 2016 |
| 245 | "The Demon's Arm"; Transliteration: "Oni no ude" (Japanese: おにのうで) | December 18, 2016 |
A cold woman appears (this tale is a second renewal), a Tengu is their biggest fan, and the demon vow's revenge.
| 246 | "The Taishiko Dumpling"; Transliteration: "Taishiko dango" (Japanese: たいしこ団子) | December 25, 2016 |
| 246 | "Dancing Yohei and the Brideless Fox"; Transliteration: "Odori Yohei to yomenashi-gitsune" (Japanese: おどり与平とよめなしギツネ) | December 25, 2016 |
| 246 | "The Kanekkoori Wife"; Transliteration: "Kanekkōri nyōbō" (Japanese: かねっこおり女房) | December 25, 2016 |
A poor woman steals rice to help a priest in need. A dancing man faces a trickster fox. A lonely man marries a woman who is actually an icicle.
| 247 | "The Three Demons of Houraiji"; Transliteration: "Hōrai-ji no san-biki no oni" (Japanese: 鳳来寺の三びきのおに) | January 8, 2017 |
| 247 | "Tegatayama"; Transliteration: "Tegatayama" (Japanese: 手形山) | January 8, 2017 |
| 247 | "The Bride's Hair-Cutting"; Transliteration: "Yome no teihatsu" (Japanese: 嫁の剃髪（ていはつ）) | January 8, 2017 |
Three demons at Fuuraiji encounter a powerful monk. Buddha puts a hand-print on a mountain. Wives are tricked into shaving their heads.
| 248 | "Shiitare is a Thief"; Transliteration: "Shītare wa nusutto" (Japanese: しいたれは ぬすっと) | January 15, 2017 |
| 248 | "The Lighting's Favorite Belly-Button"; Transliteration: "Kaminari no sukina heso" (Japanese: かみなりのすきなへそ) | January 15, 2017 |
| 248 | "Maiden Pass"; Transliteration: "Otometouge" (Japanese: 乙女峠) | January 15, 2017 |
Shiitare becomes a traveling performer. The lightning likes to eat people's belly-buttons. A faithful daughter falls to her death.
| 249 | "The Priest's Hand Towel"; Transliteration: "Obousan no tenugui" (Japanese: お坊さんの手ぬぐい) | January 22, 2017 |
| 249 | "A Story of Fuki"; Transliteration: "Fuki monogatari" (Japanese: フキものがたり) | January 22, 2017 |
| 249 | "A Thousand Ships of White Sesame Seeds and a Thousand Ships of Black Sesame Seeds"; Transliteration: "Shiro goma sen sou kuro goma sen sou" (Japanese: 白ゴマ千そう黒ゴマ千そう) | January 22, 2017 |
A monk's hand towel is a gift to a hard-working girl. Fuki learns of a spring that will heal her father's illness. A girl from Ryuuguu Palace must produce a miracle for an evil lord.
| 250 | "Sadaroku and Shiro"; Transliteration: "Sadaroku to Shiro" (Japanese: さだ六としろ) | January 29, 2017 |
| 250 | "The Man Who Healed the Dragon's Eye"; Transliteration: "Ryū no me wo naoshita otoko" (Japanese: 竜の目をなおした男) | January 29, 2017 |
| 250 | "The Talisman Bead of the Oni"; Transliteration: "Oni no omamori-dama" (Japanese: おにのおまもり玉) | January 29, 2017 |
A faithful dog tries to save his master and fails. A good doctor spreads medicine even after being betrayed. A boy challenges demons to win back the medicine he needs for his sick mom.
| 251 | "The Badgers of Noto Island"; Transliteration: "Notojima no mujina" (Japanese: 能登島のむじな) | February 5, 2017 |
| 251 | "Fukusuke-san, the God of Blessing"; Transliteration: "Fukunokami no Fukusuke-san" (Japanese: 福の神の福助さん) | February 5, 2017 |
| 251 | "Shiro and the Little Kid"; Transliteration: "Shiro to kobōzu" (Japanese: しろと小坊主) | February 5, 2017 |
Badgers protect an island. Fukusuke becomes the god of blessing. Acolytes at a temple are jealous of a smart dog.
| 252 | "Starfire (2)"; Transliteration: "Hoshi no hi" (Japanese: 星の火) | February 12, 2017 |
| 252 | "Yam Forest"; Transliteration: "Imo no mori" (Japanese: 芋の森) | February 12, 2017 |
| 252 | "The Ageha Butterfly Repays a Debt"; Transliteration: "Ageha-chō no ongaeshi" (Japanese: あげは蝶の恩返し) | February 12, 2017 |
Two boys catch a star (this tale is a renewal). A greedy old woman won't share her yams. A butterfly repays a debt.
| 253 | "The Medicine that Works Here and There"; Transliteration: "Botsubotsu kiku kusuri" (Japanese: ぼつぼつ効く薬) | February 19, 2017 |
| 253 | "The Monster Tamer (2)"; Transliteration: "Bakemonozukai" (Japanese: 化け物使い) | February 19, 2017 |
| 253 | "The Frog of Kyoto, the Frog of Osaka"; Transliteration: "Kyō no kaeru, Ōsaka no kaeru" (Japanese: 京の蛙、大坂の蛙) | February 19, 2017 |
A woman wants a drug to slowly kill her mother-in-law. An old man is terrible to his servants, even when those servants are monsters (this tale is a renewal). A frog from Kyoto and a frog from Osaka visit each other's cities.
| 254 | "The Raccoon Forest of Shoujou Temple (2)"; Transliteration: "Shōjō-ji no tanukibayashi" (Japanese: しょうじょう寺の狸ばやし) | February 26, 2017 |
| 254 | "The Night Forest of the Hina Dolls (2)"; Transliteration: "Hina no yobayashi" (Japanese: 雛の夜ばやし) | February 26, 2017 |
| 254 | "The Man Who Almost Became a Cat"; Transliteration: "Neko ni nari kaketa otoko" (Japanese: ネコになりかけた男) | February 26, 2017 |
Raccoons play the drums at Shoujouji temple (this tale is a renewal). Hina dolls play drums throughout the night (this tale is a renewal). A man almost become a cat.
| 255 | "Momotarō (5)"; Transliteration: "Momotarō" (Japanese: 桃太郎) | March 4, 2017 |
| 255 | "The Guardian of Farts"; Transliteration: "He no bannin" (Japanese: 屁の番人) | March 4, 2017 |
| 255 | "The Mitten Crab Repays a Debt"; Transliteration: "Tsugani no ongaeshi" (Japanese: ツガニの恩返し) | March 4, 2017 |
Momotarō is born from a peach (this tale is a fourth renewal). A man protects a storehouse with his giant farts. A mitten crab repays a debt.
| 256 | "Kintarō (4)"; Transliteration: "Kintarō" (Japanese: 金太郎) | March 11, 2017 |
| 256 | "The Curse of the Utou Bird"; Transliteration: "Utō-dori no tatari" (Japanese: うとう鳥のたたり) | March 11, 2017 |
| 256 | "Yattobei and the Tengu"; Transliteration: "Yattobē to tengu" (Japanese: やっとべえと天狗) | March 11, 2017 |
Kintarō grows up to be big and strong, and fights a demon (this tale is a third renewal). The Utou birds unleash a terrible curse. Yattobei battles a Tengu.
| 257 | "Urashima Tarō (4)"; Transliteration: "Urashimatarō" (Japanese: 浦島太郎) | March 18, 2017 |
| 257 | "The One Ka Priest"; Transliteration: "Ikka oshō" (Japanese: 一荷おしょう) | March 18, 2017 |
| 257 | "The Body-Throwing Stone"; Transliteration: "Minage ishi" (Japanese: 身なげ石) | March 18, 2017 |
Urashima Tarō visits an undersea palace (this tale is a third renewal). A priest teaches a magistrate a lesson for wasting his time. A horse falls in love with a princess.
| 258 | "Little One Inch (4)"; Transliteration: "Issun-bōshi" (Japanese: 一寸法師) | March 25, 2017 |
| 258 | "The Great Snake of Onnagawadani"; Transliteration: "Onnagawadani no daija" (Japanese: 女川谷の大蛇) | March 25, 2017 |
| 258 | "The Rain Calling Bodhisattva"; Transliteration: "Amagoi Bosatsu" (Japanese: 雨ごい菩薩) | March 25, 2017 |
Little One Inch is very small (this tale is a third renewal). A great snake threatens the villagers of Onnagawadani. A Bodhisattva calls the rain. Final episode

== Hometown Visiting: Folktales from Japan episode list ==
| No. | Title | Original release date |
|---|---|---|
| 1 | "Sameuratarou Became a Rock"; Transliteration: "Ishi ni natta Sameuratarō" (Japanese: 石になった鮫浦太郎) | April 2, 2017 |
| 1 | "Koukichi Flies Through The Sky"; Transliteration: "Kōkichi – sora wo tobu" (Japanese: 幸吉・空を飛ぶ) | April 2, 2017 |
A whale turns into a rock. A man wants to learn to fly, but runs into resistance from the Japanese government.
| 2 | "The Bamboo Shoot Child"; Transliteration: "Take no kodōji" (Japanese: 竹の子童子) | April 9, 2017 |
| 2 | "The Demon Kite of Ikinoshima"; Transliteration: "Ikinoshima no ondako" (Japanese: 壱岐の島の鬼凧(おんだこ)) | April 9, 2017 |
A child appears from inside a stalk of bamboo. A village makes a kite with the face of an oni.
| 3 | "The Catfish God"; Transliteration: "Namazugami" (Japanese: なまず神) | April 16, 2017 |
| 3 | "Inō Tadataka"; Transliteration: "Inō Tadataka" (Japanese: 伊能忠敬(いのうただたか)) | April 16, 2017 |
A wife unwittingly offends a powerful catfish god. Inou Tadataka becomes the first man to make a map of Japan.
| 4 | "Kappa Stone"; Transliteration: "Kappa ishi" (Japanese: かっぱ石) | April 23, 2017 |
| 4 | "The Moss Ball of Akan Lake"; Transliteration: "Akanko no marimo" (Japanese: 阿寒湖のマリモ) | April 23, 2017 |
A boy throws a rock at a baby kappa, and its father puts a powerful curse on him. The lake moss of the Ainu come to be referred as the heart of the forest.
| 5 | "The Hunter and The Oni"; Transliteration: "Kariudo to oni" (Japanese: 狩人と鬼) | April 30, 2017 |
| 5 | "The Three Shrine Festival of Asakusa"; Transliteration: "Asakusa - sanjamatsuri" (Japanese: 浅草・三社祭) | April 30, 2017 |
A hunter outwits a giant ogre called an oni. Two sons find a statue of one of the buddhas while trying to catch fish for their sick mother.
| 6 | "Anju and Zushiou"; Transliteration: "Anju to Zushiō" (Japanese: 安寿と厨子王) | May 7, 2017 |
| 6 | "Kicchomu-san the Sharp"; Transliteration: "Tonchi no Kitchomu-san" (Japanese: とんちの吉四六さん) | May 7, 2017 |
A brother and sister escape from enslavement. Stories are told of Kicchomu, who is famous for his cleverness.
| 7 | "Granny Orin and the Bottle Rock"; Transliteration: "Orin baba to tokkuri iwa" (Japanese: おりん婆ととっくり岩) | May 14, 2017 |
| 7 | "The Madara Demon God and Kannon-sama"; Transliteration: "Madara kishin to kannon-sama" (Japanese: マダラ鬼神と観音さま) | May 14, 2017 |
An old woman sacrifices herself to bring prosperity to a starving village. A demon god repairs a destroyed temple.
| 8 | "The Akoya Pine"; Transliteration: "Akoya no matsu" (Japanese: あこやの松) | May 21, 2017 |
| 8 | "The Spicy Lotus Root of Higo"; Transliteration: "Higo no karashi renkon" (Japanese: 肥後のからしれんこん) | May 21, 2017 |
A girl falls in love with the spirit of a pine tree. A frail lord is tempted into eating more by the power of mustard and lotus root.
| 9 | "Chikaraishi Plays Sumo"; Transliteration: "Sumou wo totta Chikaraishi" (Japanese: 相撲をとった力石) | May 28, 2017 |
| 9 | "The Great Buddha of Nara"; Transliteration: "Nara no daibutsu" (Japanese: 奈良の大仏) | May 28, 2017 |
A man named Chikaraishi battles Kappa for sumo supremacy. The great buddha of Nara is built over a period of decades.
| 10 | "The Golden Ladle"; Transliteration: "Kin no shakushi" (Japanese: 金のしゃくし) | June 4, 2017 |
| 10 | "The Chagu-Chagu Pony"; Transliteration: "Chagu-Chagu mako" (Japanese: チャグチャグ馬コ) | June 4, 2017 |
An ogre possesses a golden ladle. A young boy's beloved horse is brutally treated by a rich man.
| 11 | "The Wolf Rich Man"; Transliteration: "Ōkami chōja" (Japanese: オオカミ長者) | June 11, 2017 |
| 11 | "Shouki-san and the Demon Roof Tile"; Transliteration: "Shōki-san to onigawara" (Japanese: 鍾馗(しょうき)さんと鬼瓦(おにがわら)) | June 11, 2017 |
A man gains the ability to see others for the animals they really are. A demon roof tile brings misfortune.
| 12 | "Doukan"; Transliteration: "Dōkan" (Japanese: 道灌(どうかん)) | June 18, 2017 |
| 12 | "Priest Enkuu"; Transliteration: "Enkū shōnin" (Japanese: 円空上人) | June 18, 2017 |
A peasant hears about Japanese poetry and decides to try some for himself. A monk whittles 100,000 statues of buddha.
| 13 | "The Beefy Biceps Given By A Ghost"; Transliteration: "Yūrei ni moratta chikarakobu" (Japanese: 幽霊にもらった力こぶ) | June 25, 2017 |
| 13 | "The Yummy Miso that's a Hacchou Away"; Transliteration: "Hatchō-saki no umai miso" (Japanese: 八丁先のうまい味噌) | June 25, 2017 |
A ghost makes a man strong. Good miso is found only a short distance away.
| 14 | "The Giant Barley Straw Snake"; Transliteration: "Mugiwara daija" (Japanese: 麦わら大蛇) | July 2, 2017 |
| 14 | "Uesugi Youzan Makes It Work"; Transliteration: "Nasebanaru Uesugi Yōzan" (Japanese: なせばなる 上杉鷹山) | July 2, 2017 |
A snake made of straw comes to life. Uesugi Youzan makes things happen.
| 15 | "The Tofu Priest Statue"; Transliteration: "Tōfu jizō" (Japanese: とうふ地蔵) | July 9, 2017 |
| 15 | "Hiraga Gennai"; Transliteration: "Hiraga Gennai" (Japanese: 平賀源内) | July 9, 2017 |
A greedy man wants to cheat customers out of tofu. A lowly merchant grows to great riches.
| 16 | "Houko-san"; Transliteration: "Hōko-san" (Japanese: ほうこさん) | July 16, 2017 |
| 16 | "Wabicha and Sennou Rikyuu"; Transliteration: "Wabicha to Sen'nōrikyū" (Japanese: 侘茶と千利休) | July 16, 2017 |
A girl sacrifices herself to save her master's daughter. Sen Rikyuu creates a new style of tea.
| 17 | "Tanuki Fields (Rice Fields)"; Transliteration: "Tanuki da" (Japanese: たぬき田) | July 23, 2017 |
| 17 | "The Orange Boat of Bunzaemon"; Transliteration: "Bunzaemon no mikan-bune" (Japanese: 文左衛門のみかん船) | July 23, 2017 |
Tanuki plow a field for a kind man. Bunzaemon becomes rich selling oranges.
| 18 | "The Pilgrim and the Bath"; Transliteration: "Ohendosan to ofuro" (Japanese: おへんどさんとおふろ) | July 30, 2017 |
| 18 | "The Slaying of the Monster of Himeji Castle"; Transliteration: "Himeji-jō no mononoke taiji" (Japanese: 姫路城のもののけ退治) | July 30, 2017 |
A man gets a bathtub stuck to his butt by an angry god. A warrior challenges the ghosts of Himeji castle.
| 19 | "The Power Given by an Ogre"; Transliteration: "Oni ga kureta chikara" (Japanese: 鬼がくれた力) | August 6, 2017 |
| 19 | "The Okesabushi of Okei"; Transliteration: "Okei no okesabushi" (Japanese: おけいのおけさ節) | August 6, 2017 |
An oni gives a girl great power. A cat of repays the kindness of its owners.
| 20 | "A Story of Sage Kume"; Transliteration: "Kume sennin no hanashi" (Japanese: 久米仙人の話) | August 13, 2017 |
| 20 | "The Moon, The Buddha and My Soba"; Transliteration: "Tsuki to Hotoke to ora ga soba" (Japanese: 月と仏とおらが蕎麦) | August 13, 2017 |
A man wants to be a Sennin but fails, so he becomes a salesman instead. Kobayashi Issa, the haiku poet, thinks of the sun, the moon, and his soba.
| 21 | "Osengafuchi"; Transliteration: "Osengafuchi" (Japanese: お仙が淵) | August 20, 2017 |
| 21 | "The Medicine-seller of Toyama"; Transliteration: "Toyama no Kusuri-uri" (Japanese: 富山の薬売り) | August 20, 2017 |
A man falls in love with a carp he catches in a lake. A lord learns the ways of herbs.
| 22 | "Daikoku-sama and Denzaburou the Rich Man"; Transliteration: "Daikoku-sama to Denzaburō chōja" (Japanese: 大黒さまと伝三郎長者) | August 27, 2017 |
| 22 | "The Tanuki Priest and Kenchin Soup"; Transliteration: "Tanuki oshō to kenchinjiru" (Japanese: たぬき和尚とけんちん汁) | August 27, 2017 |
A lazy man becomes rich with the help of a god. A raccoon gathers donations for a temple.
| 23 | "The Dream-Telling Priest Statue"; Transliteration: "Yume Tsuge jizō" (Japanese: ゆめつげ地蔵) | September 3, 2017 |
| 23 | "The Iwatsuki Doll"; Transliteration: "Iwatsuki no ningyō" (Japanese: 岩槻の人形) | September 3, 2017 |
A priest statue gives warnings in dreams. A master dollmaker makes a doll from unique materials.
| 24 | "Ninja Isuke and the Salamander"; Transliteration: "Ninja Isuke to ōsanshouuo" (Japanese: 忍者伊助とオオサンショウウオ) | September 10, 2017 |
| 24 | "Arita Porcelain's Persimmons' Glow"; Transliteration: "Kaki no Kagayaki Aritayaki" (Japanese: 柿の輝き有田焼) | September 10, 2017 |
A ninja learns secret techniques. New methods for pottery are devised.
| 25 | "The Rice-Spouting Priest Statue"; Transliteration: "Kome-dashi jizō" (Japanese: 米出し地蔵) | September 17, 2017 |
| 25 | "The Dog's Ise Visiting"; Transliteration: "Inu no o-Isemairi" (Japanese: 犬のお伊勢参り) | September 17, 2017 |
A priest statue spits out yummy rice. A dog goes to Ise.
| S1 | "[Masterpiece Selection] The Wolf Rich Man"; Transliteration: "[Kessakusen] Ōkami chōja" (Japanese: 【傑作選】 オオカミ長者) | September 24, 2017 |
| S1 | "[Masterpiece Selection] Koukichi Flies Through The Sky"; Transliteration: "[Kessakusen] Kōkichi – sora wo tobu" (Japanese: 【傑作選】 幸吉・空を飛ぶ) | September 24, 2017 |
A man gains the ability to see others for the animals they really are (repeat from Episode 11). A man wants to learn to fly, but runs into resistance from the Japanese government (repeat from Episode 1).
| 26 | "The Sesame Seed Manjuu"; Transliteration: "Goma manjū" (Japanese: ゴマまんじゅう) | October 1, 2017 |
| 26 | "The beginning of Dogo Hot Spring"; Transliteration: "Dōgo onsen no hajimari" (Japanese: 道後温泉のはじまり) | October 1, 2017 |
A woman uses sesame seed buns to turn people into cows. The hot springs at dogo are discovered.
| 27 | "Heishirou of Dokkoi Makabe"; Transliteration: "Dokkoi Makabe no Heishirō" (Japanese: どっこい真壁の平四郎) | October 8, 2017 |
| 27 | "Standing on Mt.Fuji"; Transliteration: "Fuji-san ni tatsu" (Japanese: 富士山にたつ) | October 8, 2017 |
A boy becomes high priest after a lowly upbringing. A girl becomes the first woman to stand on Mt. Fuji.
| 28 | "The Bikki Wife"; Transliteration: "Bikki no yome-san" (Japanese: びっきのよめさん) | October 15, 2017 |
| 28 | "The Oumi Merchant"; Transliteration: "Ōmi shōnin" (Japanese: 近江商人) | October 15, 2017 |
A man marries a frog wife. A merchant from Edo teaches people a valuable lesson about quality goods.
| 29 | "The Ship Ghosts of Usa"; Transliteration: "Usa no fune yūrei" (Japanese: 宇佐の船ゆうれい) | October 22, 2017 |
| 29 | "The Tanuki War of Awa"; Transliteration: "Awa no tanuki gassen" (Japanese: 阿波の狸合戦) | October 22, 2017 |
A ship of ghosts tries to drag the living to the bottom of the ocean. Raccoons fight a war in Awa.
| 30 | "The Rain of the Setomono Festival"; Transliteration: "Setomono matsuri no ame" (Japanese: せとものまつりの雨) | October 29, 2017 |
| 30 | "The Silkworm and the Wife Lord"; Transliteration: "Kakādenka to Okaiko-sama" (Japanese: かかあ天下とお蚕さま) | October 29, 2017 |
A hard-working potter learns the secrets of lacquerware. In Shirataki, the wife is the boss.
| 31 | "Eyeball Swapping"; Transliteration: "Mentama no irekae" (Japanese: 目ん玉のいれかえ) | November 5, 2017 |
| 31 | "The Byakkotai (White Tiger Force)"; Transliteration: "Byakkotai" (Japanese: 白虎隊) | November 5, 2017 |
A man becomes a doctor after his eyeball falls out. In Aizu, the Byakkotai dies at the end of a war.
| 32 | "The Priest and the Old Tanuki"; Transliteration: "Oshō-san to furudanuki" (Japanese: 和尚さんと古狸) | November 12, 2017 |
| 32 | "Otane's Lake"; Transliteration: "Otane no ike" (Japanese: おたねの池) | November 12, 2017 |
A priest becomes friends with an old raccoon. A beautiful woman called Otane meets a sad fate.
| 33 | "The Man Who Wanted to be a Black Kite"; Transliteration: "Tonbi ni naritakatta otoko" (Japanese: トンビになりたかった男) | November 19, 2017 |
| 33 | "The Mountain Princess of Yakushima"; Transliteration: "Yakushima no yama-hime" (Japanese: 屋久島の山姫) | November 19, 2017 |
A man wants to be a black kite. A sinister creature haunts a tree on an island.
| 34 | "Wanting to be Poor"; Transliteration: "Binbō naritaya" (Japanese: びんぼうなりたや) | November 26, 2017 |
| 34 | "The Blessing of Uzumi"; Transliteration: "Uzumi no sachi" (Japanese: うずみの幸) | November 26, 2017 |
A man wants to be poor. A lord forbids his people from luxuries.
| 35 | "Yajiemon and the Big Bear"; Transliteration: "Ōguma to Yajiemon" (Japanese: 大グマと弥次衛門) | December 3, 2017 |
| 35 | "Nikkou Toushougu and Hidari Jingorou"; Transliteration: "Nikkō Tōshōgū to Hidari Jingorō" (Japanese: 日光東照宮と左甚五郎) | December 3, 2017 |
Yajiemon fights a giant bear. A man designs the gate for a temple after badly injuring his left hand.
| 36 | "The God Riding on a Cucumber"; Transliteration: "Kyūri ni notta kamisama" (Japanese: キュウリにのった神さま) | December 10, 2017 |
| 36 | "Use an Abacus to make Kaga a Million Koku"; Transliteration: "Soroban de kaga hyakumangoku" (Japanese: ソロバンで加賀百万石) | December 10, 2017 |
A god rides on a cucumber. A lord becomes rich using his abacus to keep expenses down.
| 37 | "The Farting Wife"; Transliteration: "Hehiri yome" (Japanese: 屁ひり嫁) | December 17, 2017 |
| 37 | "The Chef of Shuri Castle"; Transliteration: "Shuri-jō no ryōri-ban" (Japanese: 首里城の料理番) | December 17, 2017 |
A wife farts so hard that she blows down trees. A chef in Okinawa competes for the best dish.
| 38 | "The Mountain Granny's Mochi"; Transliteration: "Yamanba no mochi" (Japanese: やまんばのもち) | December 24, 2017 |
| 38 | "Namahage"; Transliteration: "Namahage" (Japanese: なまはげ) | December 24, 2017 |
A mountain granny brings prosperity in exchange for delicious mochi. Horrible creatures called Namahage strike a town in Akita.
| 39 | "The Invisible Man"; Transliteration: "Ongyō no otoko" (Japanese: 隠形の男) | December 28, 2017 |
| 39 | "The River Otter of Shimanto River"; Transliteration: "Shimantogawa no kawauso" (Japanese: 四万十川のカワウソ) | December 28, 2017 |
A man becomes invisible and feels very alone. A river otter is tricked by dastardly shrimp.
| 40 | "Three Grains of Rice, Three Grains of Gold"; Transliteration: "Kometsubu mitsubu, ōgon mitsubu" (Japanese: 米つぶ三つぶ黄金三つぶ) | January 7, 2018 |
| 40 | "Jirochō of Shimizu"; Transliteration: "Shimizu no Jirochō" (Japanese: 清水の次郎長) | January 7, 2018 |
Three grains of rice become three grains of gold. A man named Jirochou is an inspiration to everyone.
| 41 | "The Swordsman and the Bale of Straw"; Transliteration: "Warataba to bugeisha" (Japanese: わら束と武芸者) | January 14, 2018 |
| 41 | "The Pack Carriers of Mackerel Highway"; Transliteration: "Saba kaidō no shoi hito" (Japanese: 鯖街道の背負い人) | January 14, 2018 |
A samurai breaks a teacup owned by a poor man. Pack runners carry salmon along a mountain path.
| 42 | "Mountain Granny Shrine"; Transliteration: "Yamanba-dō" (Japanese: やまんば堂) | January 21, 2018 |
| 42 | "Sugawara Michizane and the Legend of the Flying Plum"; Transliteration: "Sugawara Michizane to tobiume densetsu" (Japanese: 菅原道真と飛梅伝説) | January 21, 2018 |
A mountain grannie repays those who are kind to her. A child prodigy is banished far from the capital.
| 43 | "The Paper Bag Wind"; Transliteration: "Kanbukuro no kaze" (Japanese: 紙ぶくろの風) | January 28, 2018 |
| 43 | "Tanabata-san's Present"; Transliteration: "Tanabata-san no okurimono" (Japanese: 七夕さんの贈りもの) | January 28, 2018 |
A man bags the wind. An ancient legend about Tanabata is still told to this day.
| 44 | "The Mountain Monk Tanuki"; Transliteration: "Yamabushi danuki" (Japanese: 山伏ダヌキ) | February 4, 2018 |
| 44 | "The Doll Stones of Kintai Bridge"; Transliteration: "Kintaikyō no ningyōishi" (Japanese: 錦帯橋の人形石) | February 4, 2018 |
A raccoon disguises itself as a mountain monk. A woman is sacrificed to make a bridge sturdy.
| 45 | "Yagorou-don and the Men"; Transliteration: "Yagorō-don to otokotachi" (Japanese: 弥五郎どんと男たち) | February 11, 2018 |
| 45 | "The Bug-Sending of Tsugaru"; Transliteration: "Tsugaru no mushi-okuri" (Japanese: 津軽の虫おくり) | February 11, 2018 |
A giant called Yagorou-dono lived long ago. A god drives away insects from crops.
| 46 | "Ishidoumaru"; Transliteration: "Ishidōmaru" (Japanese: 石堂丸) | February 18, 2018 |
| 46 | "Konoshiro and Matsue Castle"; Transliteration: "Matsue-jō to Konoshiro" (Japanese: 松江城とコノシロ) | February 18, 2018 |
A boy called Ishidoumaru searches for his father. A lord battles a monster in his keep.
| 47 | "The Colt that Escaped from a Painting"; Transliteration: "E kara nukedeta kouma" (Japanese: 絵からぬけでた子馬) | March 4, 2018 |
| 47 | "Cold Soup Granny"; Transliteration: "Hiyajiru bāchan" (Japanese: 冷や汁婆ちゃん) | March 4, 2018 |
A horse from a painting comes alive. A recipe is made for cold soup.
| 48 | "The Monk Who Went to Hell"; Transliteration: "Jigoku ni ochita bōsan" (Japanese: 地獄におちた坊さん) | March 11, 2018 |
| 48 | "Mito Mitsukuni is Hungry"; Transliteration: "Kuishinbō na Mito Mitsukuni" (Japanese: 食いしん坊な水戸光圀) | March 11, 2018 |
A greedy priest is sent to hell. A great man named Mito Mitsukuni is very hungry.
| 49 | "The 16th Day Cherry Tree"; Transliteration: "Jūroku-nichi zakura" (Japanese: 十六日桜) | March 18, 2018 |
| 49 | "Monkey Bridge"; Transliteration: "Saruhashi" (Japanese: 猿橋) | March 18, 2018 |
A cherry tree blooms on the night of the full moon. A bridge-maker makes a bridge over a steep canyon.
| 50 | "The Gongen-sama on the Northern Mountain"; Transliteration: "Kita no oyama no Gongen-sama" (Japanese: 北のお山の権現さま) | March 25, 2018 |
| 50 | "Anchin and Kiyohime"; Transliteration: "Anchin to Kiyohime" (Japanese: 安珍と清姫) | March 25, 2018 |
A goddess lives on the northern mountain. Kiyohime becomes a snake and attacks the one she loves. Final episode
