= Shippeitaro =

Japanese fairy tale and dog

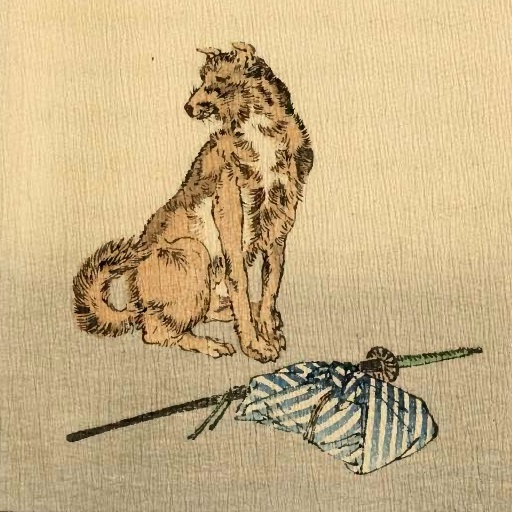
- "Schippeitaro is a strong and beautiful dog". —from Mrs. T. H. James's Schippeitaro (1888), illustrated by Suzuki Sōsaburō [recté Suzuki Sōtarō] aka Suzuki Kason.

Folk tale
- Name: Shippeitaro
- Country: Japan
- Region: Asia

Shippeitaro or Shippei Taro (German spelling: Schippeitaro; Japanese: しっぺい太郎 or 竹篦太郎) is the name of a helper dog in the Japanese fairy tale (Note: Various examples attested in Miyagi, Yamagata, Fukushima, Niigata, Gunma, Shizuoka, and Shimane Prefectures. Kobayashi (2012), Table 1.) by the same name.

== Etymology ==
Although the name Shippeitaro has been written 竹篦太郎 suggesting a connection to a bamboo hitting stick in Buddhist religion, it has been asserted to be a corruption of Shippūtarō (疾風太郎) meaning "swift wind Tarō", and the same characters can also be read Hayatetarō, thus explaining variant names such as Hayatarō "swift Tarō".

== Variant traditions ==
Translations include "Schippeitaro" in Andrew Lang's Violet Fairy Book (1901), taken from a German copy, and Mrs. James's "Schippeitaro" (1888), which share the same plotline: The mountain spirit and its minions (in the guise of cats in this version) demand a yearly human sacrifice of a maiden from the local village. A young warrior overhears the spirits hinting that their would-be bane was "Shippeitaro", which turns out to be a dog. This dog is substituted for the maiden to be placed inside the sacrificial container, and when the spirits arrive, the warrior and dog attack the cats and vanquish them.

The evil spirits appear as monkeys in most instances of the tale, as in the version of "Shippei Taro" given in Keigo Seki's anthology (translated into English 1963). In fact, this folktale is classified as "Destroying the Monkey Demon" (Sarugami taiji) tale type by Japanese folklorists.

Monkey God tales preserved in the medieval anthologies Konjaku Monogatarishū and Uji Shūi Monogatari have been suggested as being the original sources of the orally disseminated versions.

There is also the theory that the story was invented after the historical occasion of the Yanahime (Mitsuke Tenjin) shrine in Iwata, Shizuoka (Tōtōmi Province) sending volumes of sutras to the Kōzen-ji temple, Nagano Prefecture (Shinano Province) in 1793. The dog is called Hayatarō or Heibōtarō in the versions at the temple and in folktales of the vicinity. But the dog name has been standardized as Shippeitarō in the region of the shrine.

== Nomenclature ==
The term shippei (竹篦) denotes a "bamboo staff" in Zen Buddhism, and is connected with the expression shippegaeshi meaning "repercussion" or "backlash".

However, it has been asserted that the name Shippeitarō―was originally unconnected with religious implement―and was a corruption of Shippūtarō (疾風太郎), meaning "swift wind Tarō", which as a matter of commonplace knowledge, can also be read Hayatetarō (疾風太郎), and the same scholar points out that the dog is known by the forms Shippeitarō or Hayatetarō in local (Mitsuke Shrine of Shizuoka) legend.

In variants, the dog may have Suppeitarō, Suppetarō or a variety of other names, for example, "Hayatarō of Kōzenji temple in Shinano". (Note: Kobayashi's table omits the place name for his #98, so the original source (Seki) and Taguchi's table #27 need be consulted. Although other names for the dog names are attached to Kōzenji temple, it has been documented that "Hayataro's memorial" (早太郎之碑, Hayatarō no hi) was carved on the mound(grave) of the justice-serving dog in the premises of the temple.) The dog may not be given any name at all.

The form Shippeitarō (悉平太郎) (of uncertain meaning) has been adopted as standard or official one for the dog of legend attached to the Yanahime jinja shrine, commonly known as Mitsuke Tenjin. (Note: Even though Hayatarō was the main name given in the city's history published 1956, Shippeitarō (悉平太郎) became primary name for the dog legend of the shrine by its city's municipal history document of 1974. However, the dog was also known locally as Hayatetarō/Shippūtarō (疾風太郎; 'swift wind Tarō') or Hayatarō (早太郎; 'swift Tarō'). Cf. §Variants) below for further information.))

The name is altered to 執柄太郎 in kibyōshi fiction by Nansenshō Somahito, where shippei (執柄) means "to grasp authority" (cf. §Old printed books)

== Translations ==
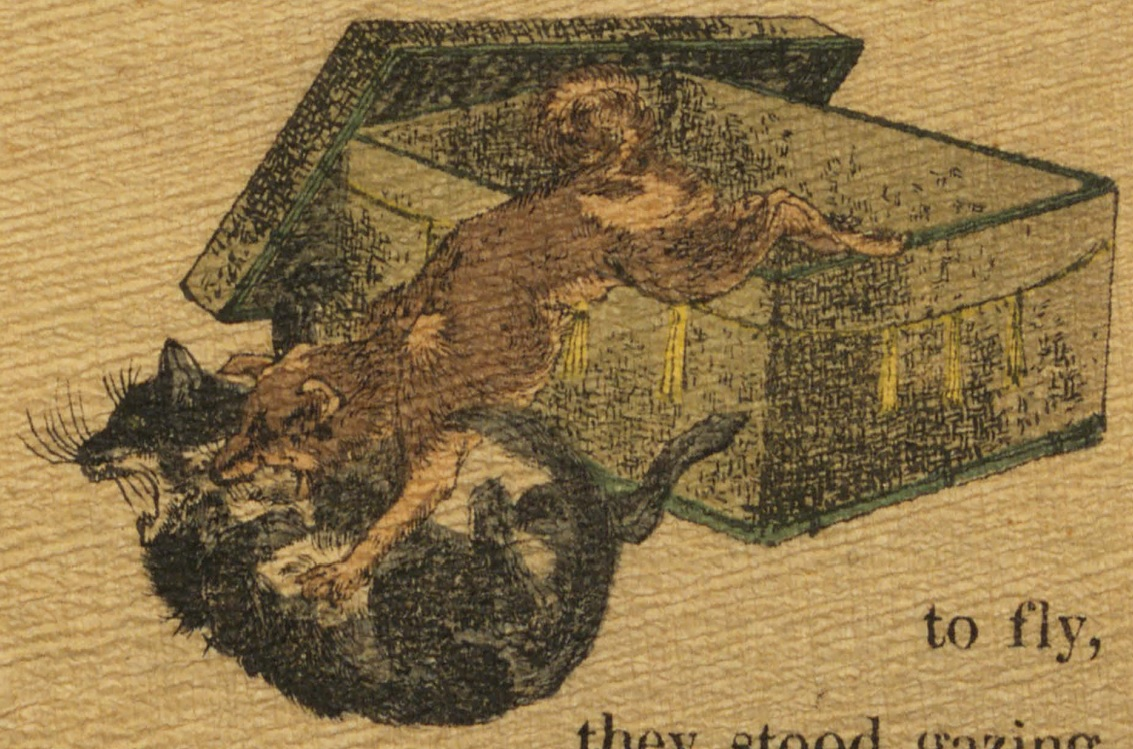
Shippeitaro attacks huge black tom cat. The "door of the cage", or rather "lid of a chest" is laid open. ―Mrs. James tr. (1888). The chirimenbon print Schippeitaro (1888 version). Suzuki Kason (illustr.)

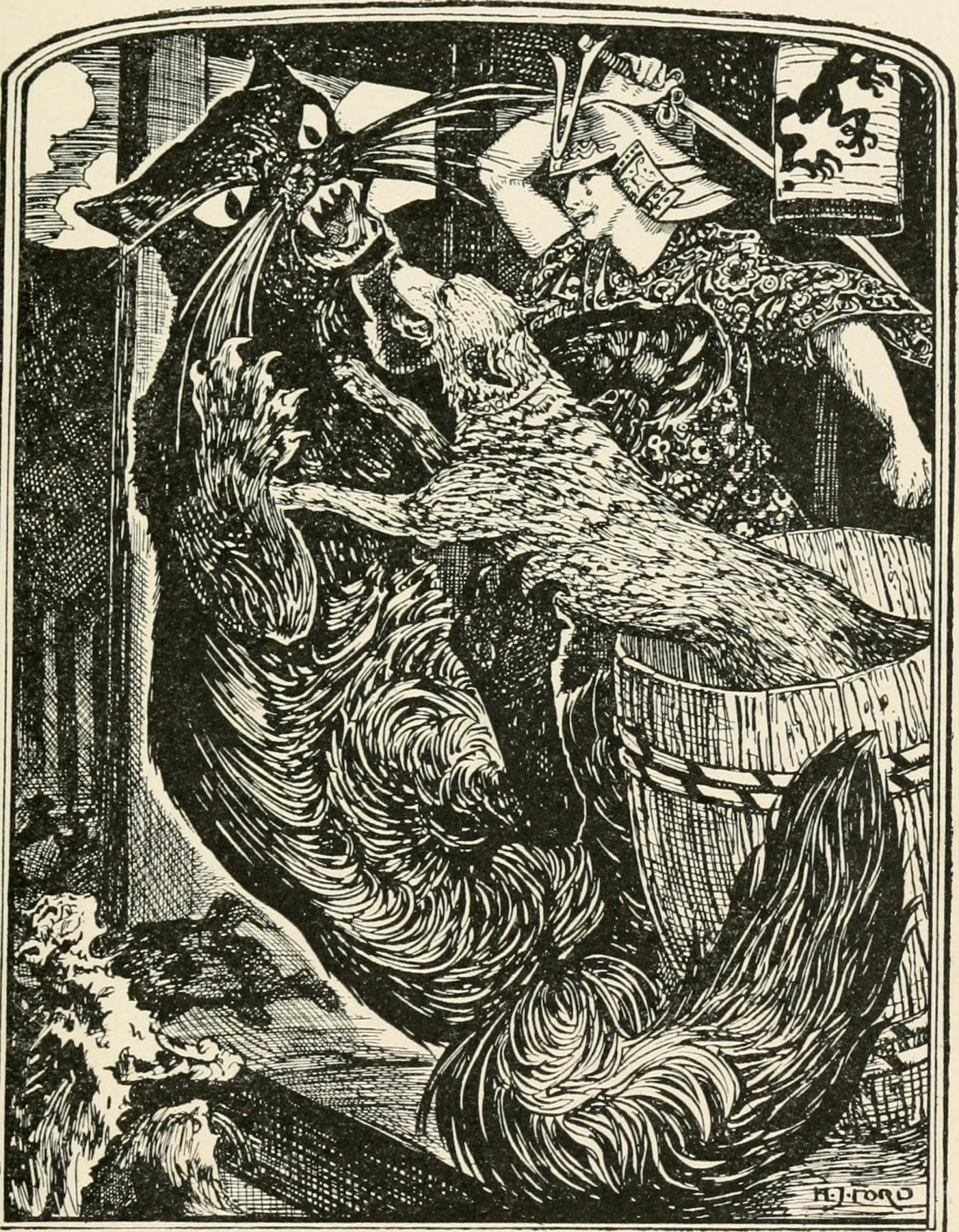
Schippeitaro out of a barrel (cask), attacking huge black tom cat. Young samurai appears quite "foreign-ish". ―Lang, Andrew (1906) Schippeitaro

The version of "Schippeitaro" in Andrew Lang's The Violet Fairy Book (1901) was taken from Japanische Märchen und Sagen collected by Professor David Brauns (Leipzig, 1885). (Note: Lang in the Violet Fairy Book only cites "Japanische Märchen", but in his Pink Fairy Book (1897), he provides the longer and fuller citation naming Brauns.)

The story of "Schippeitaro" (1888) as told by Mrs. T. H. James (Kate James), was number 17 in the "Japanese Fairy Tale Series" printed by Hasegawa Takejirō, who issued many such chirimen-bon or "crepe-paper books". Mrs. James's version follows a storyline identical to Lang's version.

The illustrator has been identified as Suzuki Kason, based on the colophon of 1889 which names the artist as Suzuki Sōsaburō (鈴木宗三郎). Even though this can be read as "Munesaburō", the artist Suzuki Kason (whose address in Tsukiji matches the colophon one) went by the common name Sōtarō (宗太郎), also written Sōtarō (惣太郎).

== Synopsis ==
Below is the summary of the Lang/Mrs. James version:

A young adventure-seeking warrior entered an enchanted forest, and he slept in a shrine (or chapel) there, (Note: Mrs. Smith calls it "little temple" or "ruined shrine", in contrast to Brauns's Kapelle and Lang's "chapel" which have Christian connotation.) and was awakened at midnight by the noises of cats yelling and dancing. The cats could be heard saying: "Do not tell Shippeitaro!"

Afterwards, the warrior visited a nearby village, and there he answered a girl's plea for help. It was the village custom to sacrifice a maiden to the mountain spirit, and it was her turn that year. She was placed inside a cage (actually a long chest or rectangular basket, as per illustration. Lang gives "cask") and left at the shrine. (Note: Brauns translated the container as Käfig which is German for "cage", concurring with Mrs. James's rendition as "cage" (Japanese:kago (籠).Ishizawa (2004), p. 53). However, Smith description that the cat "threw open the door of the cage" does not fit the illustration of removing the lid from a rectangular chest, and Miyao altered it to read "長櫃のふたを勢いよく開けました vigorously[snatched] open the lid of the long-chest (nagabitsu)". The latter term occurs in the cognate tale found in Konjaku monogatari, explained below, whereas Ishizawa more literally back-translates as kago (籠), which can also denote either an open or lidded basket. A comic book author remarked it actually looked like a tsuzura, another name for a rectangular wicker basket, well-known from the fairy tale Shita-kiri Suzume. Cf. also kōri (行李) or wicker trunk. In the version Seki collected from Monou, the container is a nagamochi (長持), which is a lidded rectangular wardrobe chest, and synonymous to nagabitsu of the old narrative. There is also a collected tale where the container is indeed a tsuzura.) (Note: Lang however rendered the container as "cask", which was illustrated as a barrel by Henry Justice Ford. And in E. K. Murray's retelling, "The Whispering Cats", the container is referred to as both "barrel" and "cask".) The warrior made inquiries to find out about the famous dog Schippeitaro (standard modern romanization: Shippeitarō), owned by the prince's overseer, (Note: "The head man of our Prince", in Mrs. James's text) and obtained permission to borrow the dog. The warrior then replaced the maiden inside the cage with Schippeitaro. The cage was brought to the shrine, and the cats arrived. When the huge black cat opened the cage, Shippeitaro jumped out and killed it. The warrior entered the fray and together they killed several more cats, and the rest of them fled. The warrior returned Schippeitaro to his rightful owner, and the village well-remembered the warrior and the heroic dog long after. (Note: Brauns only said that the locals were able to enter the forest afterwards, and lauded the bravery of the pair "to this day" (German: preisen noch heute). Lang embellished this to say the village held an annual feast in honor of the warrior and dog. Mrs. Smith's version simply concludes with the warrior seeking new adventures.)

== Variants ==
The Lang/Mrs. James version which features cats as the antagonists is actually atypical in folktales. In most Shippeitaro tales, the malevolent spirits appear as monkeys (or baboons). (Note: Seki also gives monkey in the main, with cat, rat, badger as subtypes.) However, cats did feature as the antagonist(s) of Shippeitarō in the gesaku novels of the Edo Period (§Old printed books) as well as in the kabuki and kyōgen performing arts.

The village where the victims are sacrifice occurs may be an anonymous location, (Note: Or perhaps assumed to be local to wherever the tale is told.) as in the English chirimen book version or Seki's version from Monou, but may be specified (Cf. §Kōzen-ji below). Also, it is a common motif that the household chosen to have their daughter sacrificed (by the supernatural beings) has a shiraha no ya (white-feather fletched arrow) stuck on the front of their home.

Keigo Seki collected a number of variant tales (of the Sarugami taiji or "Destroying the Monkey Demon" type) from various sources. When Seki published Nihon mukashibanashi taisei (1978), his provisional count reached 67 examples. (Note: As of the writing of the translator's headnote in Seki & Adams (1963), p. 33, the count stood at "twenty-six versions".) Later, Kōji Inada and Toshio Ozawa co-edited the Nihon mukashibanashi tsūgan (1977–1998) which added numerous examples. Kōichirō Kōbayashi's paper has collated these and other examples in a table with 227 tale specimens (plus one auxiliary specimen). Noriko Nagata went further and analyzed 258 tale examples of the Sarugami taiji type. Note however that these statistics include tales that are not of the "dog helper" type.

Seki's typical example (or at least the one he chose in his anthology for popular audience) was the "Shippei Taro" collected in Monou District, Miyagi, published in Keigo Seki (ed.), Robert J. Adams (tr.), Folktales of Japan (1963). The priest in the story defeated the so-called "ogres" (whose corpses turned out to be dead monkeys). He used the usual tactic of replacing the sacrificial maiden inside the chest with Shippei Taro, a dog brought from the distant city of Nagahama in Ōmi Province. (Note: "Collected in Mono-gun, Miyagi-ken by Keisuke Sugawara". Seki & Adams (1963), p. 33.) (Cf. § Tale types below)

Inada and Ozawa's description of the "helper dog" subtype of Sarugami taiji (Cf. § Tale types below) names the dog as Suppeitarō of Tango Province (丹波の国のすっぺい太郎), and the human as a rokubu, a type of itinerant Buddhist ascetic (or hijiri) as combating the monkey monster, indicating these are seen as typical elements. Here, "Suppei" is easily recognized as the Tōhoku dialect pronunciation of "Shippei".

The dog may or may not have a name at all. And the name is not entirely consistent. The dog's name may be only a slight variant of Shippeitaro, such as (Suppeitarō, Suppetarō (すっぺい太郎, 素平太郎, すっぺ太郎), or an alternate reading (Takeberatarō (Note: takebera is just the kun-yomi reading of shippei (竹篦), and perhaps should be read as "shippei".)) or altogether different. The dog may be Shippeitarō/Suppe(i)tarō from Ōmi or Tanba or some other province. In several examples, the dog appears as Hayatarō (早太郎) or Heibōtarō (へいぼう太郎, 兵坊太郎) of Kōzenji temple in Shinano Province.

=== Shizuoka and Nagano ===
According to one scholar the form Shippeitarō (悉平太郎) tends to occur near Enshū/Tōtomi Province (Shizuoka Prefecture), while Hayatarō (早太郎) is concentrated in Shinano Province (Nagano Prefecture). One etymological hypothesis is that in the Shinano dialect, haibō (ハイ坊) denoted "wolf cub", which probably gave rise to the name Heibōtarō, and Hayatarō may well be a further corruption of this.

==== Yanahime-jinja ====
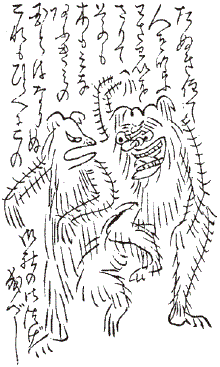
Shippeitarō and monstrous tanuki. ―Ichikawa Danjūrō VII Tōtōmimasu (1832)

It has become current-day tradition (for the Yanahime jinja in Shizuoka Prefecture, formerly Enshū or Tōtōmi Province) that the heroic was dog Shippeitarō (悉平太郎) from Kōzen-ji temple in Shinano Province (Nagano Prefecture).

But in actuality, the name of the dog in the legend attached to the shrine (Yanahime jinja aka Mitsuke Tenjin in Iwata, Shizuoka) varied, and was also known alternately by the similar names Shippūtarō/Hayatetarō (疾風太郎; 'swift wind Tarō') or Hayatarō (早太郎; 'swift Tarō'), as already noted (§Nomenclature) (Note: And in fact, Hayatarō had been used as the name in the 1956 history of the city.) In an old document, Tōtōmi koseki zue (遠江古蹟圖繪) by dating to Kyowa 3 (1803), (Note: By Tō Chōkō (藤長庚) aka Hyōdō Shōemon (兵藤庄右衛門).) the legendary dog of this shrine at Mitsuke-juku was Yazaemon (弥左衛門). However, Ichikawa Danjūrō VII (Note: Kabuki actor Danjūrō VII has performed in the play Hitoritabi gojūsantsugi ("Lone pilgrimage of 53 stations") which featured Shippeitaro as a dog attacking the monster cat. In the first performance Danjūrō VII played 4 roles including that of Mamushi no Jirokichi (蝮（まむし）の次郎吉). His enactment of Nakano Tōsuke (中野藤助) is illustrated in a ukiyo-e, reprinted in Atsumi ed. p. 483, and his role as Mizuemon on p. 549.) in a piece of document entitled Tōtōmimasu (遠〱見ます[遠ゝ見ます]) (Tenpo 3/1832) wrote that the local tradition called the dog Shippeitarō (しっぺい太郎) of Tanba Province.

Thus, while Noriko Nagata's study concluded that all the dogs in the Sarugami taiji tales of Shizuoka Prefecture have feature dogs from Shinshū (Shinano Province), this only applies to the folktales gathered in relatively current times, and this generalization fails in the Edo Period literature where the dog is Yazaemon from Raifuku-ji of Mikawa Province (三河国来福寺) in Tōtōmi koseki zue, and Danjūrō recorded Shippeitarō as being from Tanba (areas of current-day Kyōto and Hyōgo Prefectures).

Nagata also hypothesizes that "every dog comes from Shinshū(Shinano) in Sarugami taiji tales of Shizukoa, and this can hardly be unconnected with Kōzen-ji ". One can infer that none of the folktales, at least from Shizuoka, explicitly named Kōzen-ji, as can be verified in Kobayashi's study also. (Note: Tales collected locally in Nagano do, to no surprise, mention "Kōzen-ji".) Yabe concurs with Nagata more assertive states that in the "present-day tradition", the dog "Shippeitarō (悉平太郎)" comes from Kōzen-ji in Shinano. However, the only attestation he uses to corroborate is not genuine collected folklore in intact form, but rather a retold summary given in a 1984 city folklore research book.

The connection is certainly not unfounded, if documents and tales from Nagano are examined. Already during the Edo Period, one origin tale (engi) regarding the temple, entitled Butsuyaku shōmei inu-fudō reigen monogatari [?] (佛薬證明犬不動霊験物語; 'Story of spiritual-power of the holy-medicine-proving Dog-Fudō/Acala (Divine Dog)') (1794) states that human sacrifices to the Mitsuke Tanjin shrine were ongoing, and the victims were saved, though it was thanks to the holy Buddha medicine, rather than a dog. Another engi of the temple (1793?) also refers to "Tenmangū in Enshū Province (遠州府中の天満宮)" requiring villagers be offered inside a coffin. (Note: Also an early document bearing the slightly different title Kōzen-ji inu-fudō reigen monogatari [?] (光前寺犬不動霊験物語; 'Story of spiritual-power of Kōzenji's Divine Dog'), is interpolated with the text of the "Diahanyakyō hōnō no engi (大般若経奉納の縁起; 'Origin tale of the donation of the Large Prajñāpāramitā Sūtras')" (1793), which states that Tenmangū in Enshū (遠州府中の天満宮) had a byō (shrine hall), and it became customary that some handsome person from the village would be placed in a coffin (Japanese: 柩) and deposited there at the byō.)

Toshio Takagi vaguely suggested that the legend was created at a late period, by which he may have meant the "latter half of kinsei" i.e. 18th century. And Tokiwa Aoshima supposed that the legend was created after the occasions of the Yanahime-jinja shrine sending 600 volumes of sutra to Kōzen-ji in 1793, and the temple holding a kaichō (public display of its sacred objects) in 1794. Though these hypotheses require further analysis to assay their validity, if the latter were true, then there was always a connection between the shrine legend and Kōzen-ji, though unattested by the Edo period documents found by Yabe.

==== Kōzen-ji ====
Going back to Nagata's statement, the dog appears to be explicitly mentioned coming from Kōzen-ji temple in several tales among the list compiled by Kobayashi, and unsurprisingly so, since they were all collected (not from Shizuoka) but from the village or the district where the temple lies (Kamiina District, Nagano). (Note: Though Kobayashi's tabulated list is not exhaustive, since Nagata's study compiles a larger number of tale examples.)

Location of victims

In the version collected from the former Akahomura village where the temple stands, the victims are to be left as sacrifice on the altar of the Tenmangū in Enshū, which is an apt description of the Yanahime jinja (Mitsuke Tenjin) in Shizuoka. The victim chosen received notice via the white-feather arrow (白羽の矢, shiraha no ya) shot, a commonplace motif.

In the tale version printed by Toshio Takagi (1913) where the dog's name is "Heibōtarō" (兵坊太郎), (Note: The reading of "兵坊太郎" is probably "Heibōtarō" from comparison with the similar version that gives "へいぼう太郎", even though "Hyōbōtarō" was the reading given by another scholar.) the victim chosen is visited upon by a "fire pillar" in a place called Fushimi in the local Shinano Province. In a comparable version featuring "Heibōtarō" (へいぼう太郎) the victims were non-local and were found Fushimi in Mino Province. (Note: Tarō Akamine claimed there was a piece of folklore that the Chinju no Mori (forest) in Fushimi, Mino Province was once inhabited by man-eating baboons (hihi), which were exterminated by the dog Hayatarō from Kōzen-ji.)

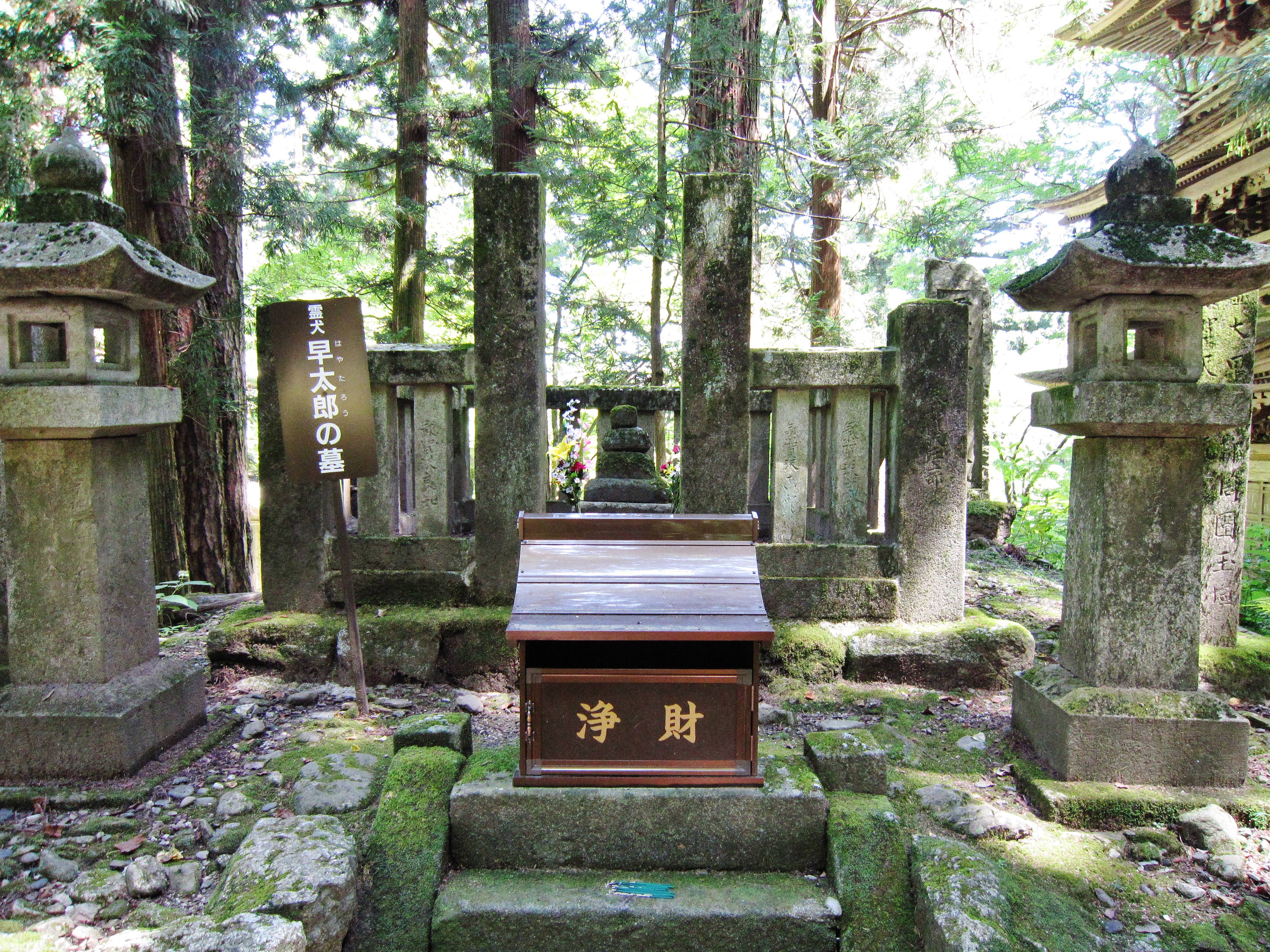
Hayatarō's grave at Kōzen-ji

Hayatarō's grave

Thus the dog's name was given variously in local folktale, even though the words "Hayataro's monument" (早太郎之碑, Hayatarō no hi) are engraved at the burial mound of the dog within Kōzen-ji's temple-grounds. The mound (tsuka), formed by a five-layer stack of stones still stands and is referred to simply as Hayatarō's grave. There is apparentlya newly replaced carved stone monument (entitled Monument of the "Record of the derivation of the spiritual[ly powerful] dog Hayatarō" (「霊犬早太郎由来記」の碑, "Reiken Hayatarō yuraiki" no hi)) has a lengthy text telling the story, which claims the priest named Benzon (弁存) had come from Mitsuke Tenjin in Enshū seeking Hayatarō, and the dog was placed in a plain wooden chest (coffin) (白木の櫃（ひつぎ）, shiraki no hitsugi) in lieu of the sacrifice.

=== Types of evil spirits ===
The evil spirits may be in the form of monkey, cat, rat, badger or "raccoon dog" (mujina, tanuki).

== Tale types ==
In Japanese folklore studies, the "Shippeitarō" story is classed under the tale type Sarugami taiji (猿神退治; "Destroying the Monkey Demon" or "Monkey Spirit Conquest"), categorized as Type 91 by Seki in his paper written in English. This general tale group is more broad, and includes tales where a dog is not involved at all. The tale group (Sarugami taiji) is assigned Seki No. 256 (NMBS = Nihon mukashibanashi shūsei II; NMBT=~taisei) in Japanese scholarship.

Seki's classification scheme (his Taisei) describes the "Destroying the Monkey Demon" type as akin to AT 300 type, where the 1st subtype involves the murder of priests (but do not feature dogs), and the 2nd type generally involves a traveler (samurai warrior) (Note: An "itinerant priest" in the Seki ed., English-translated version, from Monou District, described above.) who seeks out Shippei Taro (or some dog) and together exterminate the monstrous monkeys.

Inada and Ozawa's classification in their Tsūkan compilation establishes the Sarugami taiji type as divided into the 275A "helper dog" (犬援助型, inu enjo gata) subtype and 275B "otherworldly visit" (異郷訪問型, inu enjo gata) subtype, (Note: Both falling under the larger subdivision XI. "overcoming peril/conquest of evil" (厄難克服, yakunan kokufuku)) where "Shippeitarō" obviously belongs in the former subtype.

Since the story concludes with the heroes abolishing the practice of offering maidens as human sacrifice, it draws a parallel to the legend of Saint George and the Dragon, and there are certain similarities also to the story of Susanoo saving Kushinadahime from the great serpent Yamata no Orochi.

In the Aarne–Thompson classification, the tale is classed as "The Dragon Slayer" type, AT 300.

== Precursor ==
In the medieval anthology Konjaku Monogatarishū occurs a similar story of a sacrifice-demanding monkey god, entitled "How in Mimasaka Province a God was Trapped by a Hunter and Living Sacrifice Stopped". The Shippeitaro tales have been considered orally transmitted versions of this medieval prototype.

English translations of this medieval version is found in S. W. Jones's Ages Ago: Thirty-Seven Tales from the Konjaku Monogatari Collection (1959), and Michelle Osterfeld Li's study Ambiguous Bodies.

A similar tale is also included in another medieval anthology, the Uji Shūi Monogatari. In either case, the sacrifice demanding deities are an ape named Chūsan (中参/中山) and a serpent named Kōya (高野).

== Old printed books ==
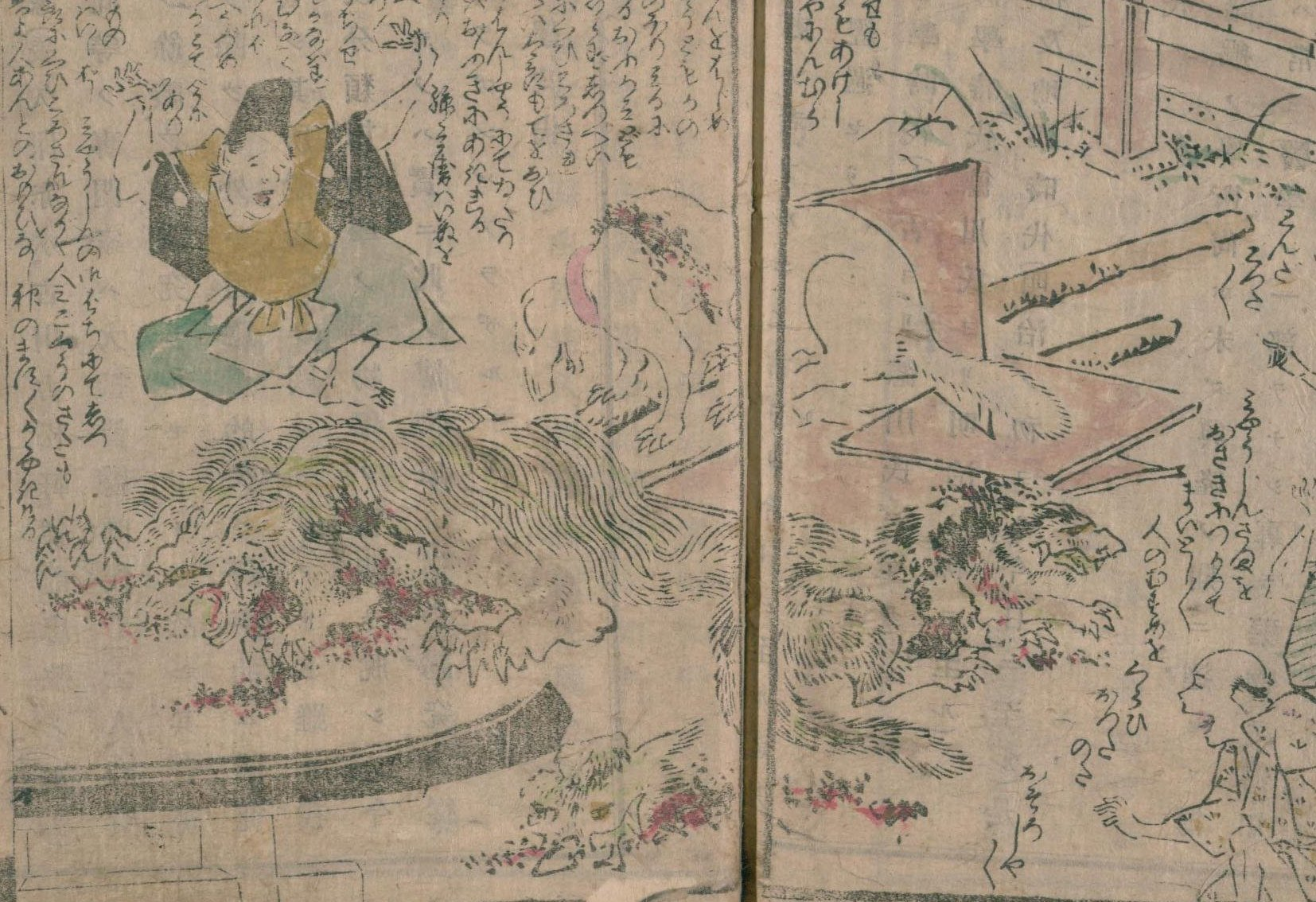
Shippeitaro breaks out of his box and destroys the wolves. —from Zōho Shippeitarō (1796), printed from a drawing by Toyokuni.

There is also a kibyōshi type printed book from the Edo Period, the Zōho Shippeitarō (1796) meaning the "expanded version" that was written by Nansenshō Somahito (南杣笑そまひと) with illustrations by ukiyo-e artist Toyokuni. This book illustrates spirits of the monkey, fox, kappa, tanuki (raccoon dog), hare, and wolf kind devouring the human sacrifice, and in the culminating scene depicts Shippeitarō defeating wolves, but no cat is featured.

Yet in Ritsujōtei Kiran's yomihon Inuneko kaiwa Shippeitarō (犬猫怪話竹箆太郎) (Bunka 6/1809), the cat features as boss, with the kappa, tanuki and fox also in the mix. The work is also known as Ehon Shippeitarō (絵本竹箆太郎; "picture book Shippeitarō"). The initial plotline ("dog husband" motif; the dog gets decapitated) bears resemblance to the well-known Nansō Satomi Hakkenden, and the child of a human girl and dog becomes Shippeitarō. At an aristocrat's household, the nursemaid's young daughter Ran makes a mess in the garden, and Shiro is instructed to eat up the defecated mess (or perhaps urine, and is promised to be given the girl as wife in return. The dog later makes conjugal visits by transforming into a man dressed in white, and she becomes pregnant. Shiro is killed by a human love-rival. Ran bears a puppy, but she accompanies the master's daughter to Tosa Province (in Shikoku) where the latter enters marriage, and is separated with the puppy. Thus the text bills Shippeitarō as "there was a dog Shippeitarō in Shikoku", the circumstances are that Shippeitarō who was left behind in Kyōto eventually reaps vengeance from the bakeneko (monster cat) that killed his mother.

The story of a supposedly famed dog named Shippekitarō related in Gakutei Kyūzan's work, Honchō akuko den. Zenpen (『本朝悪狐伝』前編; "Biographies of evil foxes in Japan. First part.") (Bunsei 12/1829), which was expanded by Tamenaga Shunsui II into his gōkan (late type, lengthy kusazōshi) entitled Mukashibanashi Shippekitarō (昔話室璧太郎) (first and second installations printed Ansei 3/1856).

== Kabuki ==
In kabuki, the so-called "gojūsan tsugi mono" or "Fifty-three stations" group of works, there are those that feature Shippeitarō. The original work of the group was Tsuruya Nanboku's Hitoritabi gojūsantsugi (独道中五十三駅) (Bunsei 10/1827). The dog Shippeitarō appears in Act III inadvertently aiding the evil group (Note: The Yurugi (由留木) clan has an evil scheming karō counselor Akabori Kandayū (赤堀官太夫), who has framed Tanba Yōhachirō (丹波与八郎) who was the son of a loyal retainer, by falsely claiming he was the true identity of a thief character in the play. The evil counselor's henchmen, Tanzō and Edobei were pursuing the Lady Shigenoi (who had become the framed man's love interest), and recruits the help of a traveller with a dog, namely Shippeitarō. But the person found inside was another woman, Omatsu, whom Edobei stabs to death, and she gives birth to a child. The dog carries this baby away.) Shippeitarō later attacks the neko no ke/nekoishi no kai (猫の怪/猫石の怪; "cat-monster/cat-stone spirit") in the "Act IV: Scene of rows of pines at Okabe-juku, ". (Note: Japanese: "以前のしつぺい太郎の犬走り出て、猫の怪（け）めがけ飛びかゝる。これに恐れて猫の怪苦しみ、タヂ〳〵となる". "いぜんのしつぺひ太郎の犬走り出て、猫石の精をめがけ飛かる。これにおそれて精くるしみ、たぢ〳〵となる".) The role of the monster cat was played by Onoe Kikugorō III, and that of Shippeitarō-dog (しつぺい太郎犬) by Kumosuke Nadaroku (雲介なだ六).

Later Mokuami wrote the revised work Gojūsantsugi ōgi no shukuzuke (五十三驛扇宿附) (First performed Meiji 20/1887), where the children's chant "Do not tell Shippeitarō of Tanba [Province]" (丹波のしっぺい太郎に沙汰するな) is written into the script. (Note: Japanese: "丹波のや〳〵しつぺい太郎に沙汰するな")。

It became commonplace cliché in kabuki for Shippeitarō to subdue the monstrous cat (bakeneko) after Namiki Shōzō wrote the script Shippeitarō kaidanki (竹箆太郎怪談記) (Hōreki 12/1762).

== See also ==
- Yanahime-jinja (aka Mitsuke-Tenjin)
- Shippei (mascot)
- shiraha no ya (white-feather fletched arrow)
- Kōzen-ji#Hayatarō legend

== See also ==
- Keisaku – Buddhist ritual implement
