= Tōfu-kozō =

Japanese supernatural being

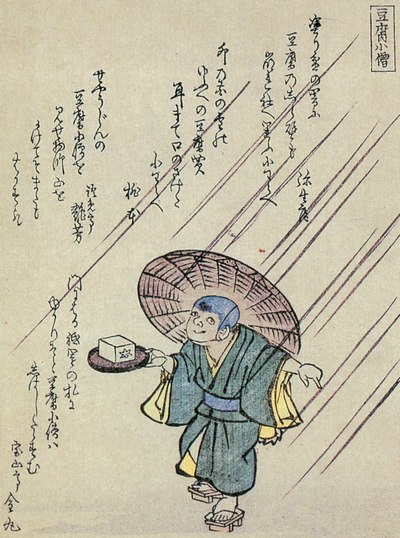
Tōfu-kozō from the Kyōka Hyaku Monogatari by Masasumi Ryuukansaijin

In Japanese folklore, tōfu-kozō (Japanese: 豆腐小僧, literally "tofu boy") is a yōkai that looks like a child holding a tray of tōfu. It frequently appears in the kusazōshi, kibyōshi and kaidan books from the Edo period, and from the Bakumatsu to the Meiji period, people have become familiar with them as a character illustrated on toys such as kites, sugoroku, and karuta. They can also be seen in senryū, kyōka, e-hon banzuke (pamphlets that introduce the contents of a shibai), and nishiki-e, etc.

== Summary ==
They are generally depicted wearing bamboo and kasa on their heads, and possessing a round tray with a momiji-dōfu on it (a tōfu with a momiji (autumn leaf) shape pressed into it). The patterns on the clothing they wear, for the sake of warding off smallpox, include lucky charms such as harukoma (春駒), daruma dolls, horned owls, swinging drums, and red fish, and sometimes lattice patterns of the child that shows its status as a child can also be seen.

In the original kusazōshi, they did not possess any special powers, and they often appear as servants that bring tōfu and sake here and there in the town, and it is also changed in senryū such poems like "tōfu-kozō are servant monsters (豆腐小僧ハ化ものゝ小間使ひ)." With regards to humans, they sometimes follow humans on rainy nights, but they don't do anything particularly bad, and they usually don't make humans their opponents, and they are frequently depicted as amicable, timid, and humorous characters. Far from doing anything bad, there are also examples where they are teased by other yōkai for being a weak yōkai. In the Heisei era and afterwards, there is also the interpretation that they are appropriate as comforting characters. Also, in the kibyōshi the "Bakemono Shiuchi Hyōbanki (妖怪仕内評判記)" by Koikawa Harumachi from the An'ei era, weasels turn into tōfu-kozō, and in later books, their father has been specified to be mikoshi-nyūdō and their mother has been specified to be rokurokubi.

In literature from the Shōwa and Heisei eras and beyond, it is frequently written that they would appear on rainy nights, and recommend the relish of tōfu to people passing by, but halfway into eating it a mold would grow. However, according to the yōkai researchers Natsuhiko Kyogoku and Bintarō Yamaguchi, this theory was created after the Shōwa era in books for children.

On the Mizuki Shigeru Road in Sakaiminato, Tottori Prefecture, the hometown of the yōkai painter and manga artist Shigeru Mizuki, next to the restaurant "Tōfuya (東府屋)," there is a statue of a tōfu-kozō based on one of Mizuki's illustrations.

== History ==
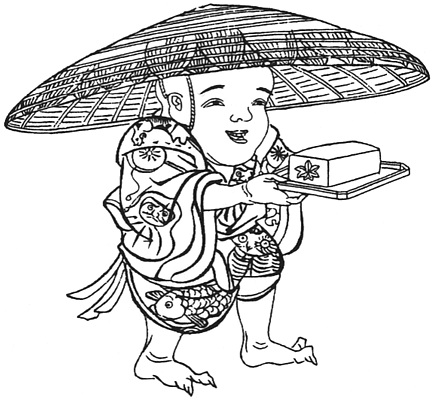
An example of a tōfu-kozō with a large head from the Bakemono Chakutōchō by Masayoshi Kitao.

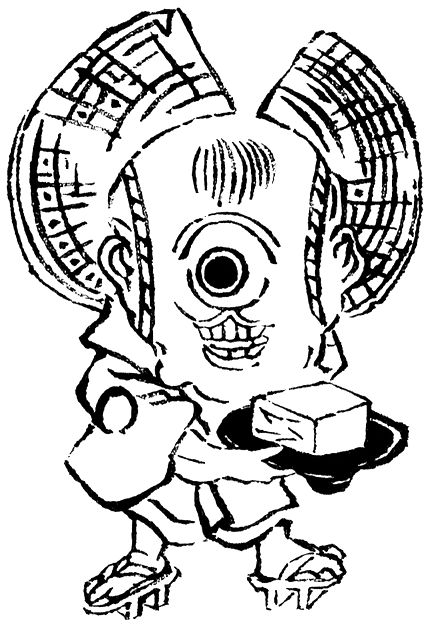
An example of a tōfu-kozō with one eye from the Ōjidai Karano Bakemono by Shuntei Katsukawa.

The tōfu-kozō has been observed to be a yōkai that suddenly appeared in the literature of the An'ei era (1772–1781), and earned great popularity as a character in the kusazōshi and kibyōshi, kaidan books, and toys of that time, a popularity that continued into the Meiji period. The aforementioned "Bakemono Shiuchi Hyōbanki" was observed to be their first appearance, and there have been no confirmations that the tōfu-kozō appeared in any earlier literature. According to the tōfu cook book Tofu Hyakuchin published in Tenmei 2 (1782), it was made into a famous yōkai that appeared in humorous literature and manga e-hon such as kusazōshi and kibyōshi.

While tōfu-kozō may have originated in contemporary urban publications, its popularity may have been drawn from the food culture of the Edo period itself. During the Edo period, nutrient-rich tōfu was a popular food choice amongst the public. There are several examples like how in kabuki, kabuki actors like Tokuji Ōtani played the role of tōfu-kozō and how they are also depicted in ukiyo-e.

In the literature of the early Edo period, there are many kozō (boy monks) with large heads, and in the aforementioned "Bakemono Shiuchi Hyōbanki", it stated "the monster called tōfu-kozō has a large head (豆腐小僧といふ化物は頭大ぶりにて)", and in the kibyōshi"Bakemono Chakutōchō (夭怪着到牒)", they were stated to be "large-headed kozō", thus putting a big emphasis on their large heads. In the late Edo period, they were often depicted with one eye. In kyōka e-hon such as the Kyōka Hyaku Monogatari, they can also be seen without any particular traits that make them look any different from a human.

== Origin ==
Since they have not been confirmed to appear in folkloristics material such as folklore, kaidan collections such as hyakumonogatari, or legends, they are seen as a yōkai created from the Edo period. They can generally be seen to be made in the middle of the Edo period or afterwards when tōfu shops or sellers became common, but the particulars of how they were made and how they suddenly disappeared has not come to light.

In the kusazōshi like what were previously mentioned, they were frequently treated as servants, but there were also yōkai that appeared earliest that were also servants such as the hitotsume-kozō, the amefurikozō, the tanuki, and the kappa, and since the hitotsume-kozō and the kappa have been depicted possessing tōfu, there is the theory that these yōkai are related to the tōfu-kozō as well as the theory that the tōfu-kozō was based on these yōkai. In "Bake no Kawa Daikoden (化皮太鼓伝)" published in Tenpō 4 (1833), there was a tanuki yōkai that wore a kasa wearing clothes that had tōfu depicted on them, giving an example that hints at the existence of tōfu-kozō.

Also, when Hyakumonogatari Kaidankai was becoming popular, there is the theory that they were made by individuals who were requested to tell kaidan stories and about yōkai that was not known throughout society yet, as well as the view that in Hasegawa Settan's paintings in the Edo Meisho Zue, since tōfu sellers were depicted wearing kasa, that tōfu-kozō are the result of changing tōfu sellers in plain clothing into children with gaudy clothing. Furthermore, tōfu-kozō can be seen to be related to tōfu shops in the Edo period, there are also the theories that they were born from some incident related to tōfu shops, or that they were a character made up by the tōfu business in order to promote their sales.

Based on the folk belief that hitotsume-kozō like tōfu, and since there was the card in yōkai karuta called "Boy with His Tongue Out Licking a Tōfu (した出し小僧のとうふなめ)," as well as senryū poems such as "behind the tōfu shop there is a one-eyed boy (豆腐やのうらは一つ目小僧也, to-o-fu-ya-no/u-ra-ha-hi-to-tsu-me/ko-zo-u na-ri)" and "tōfu-kozō are one-dice-eyed fellows wearing kasa (笠のうち眼は一ツ賽の目の奴んも化す豆腐小僧は)," it has been pointed out that tōfu-kozō would thus be no more than an alternate name for hitotsume-kozō, but since there are many tōfu-kozō that don't have one eye, there is also the claim denying that they are the same as hitotsume-kozō, and that tōfu-kozō and hitotsume-kozō were created separately. In any case, there are many parts that are still unclear, and there is still research going on about how tōfu-kozō developed.
