= Santō Kyōden =

Japanese artist, writer and shopowner (1761 - 1816)

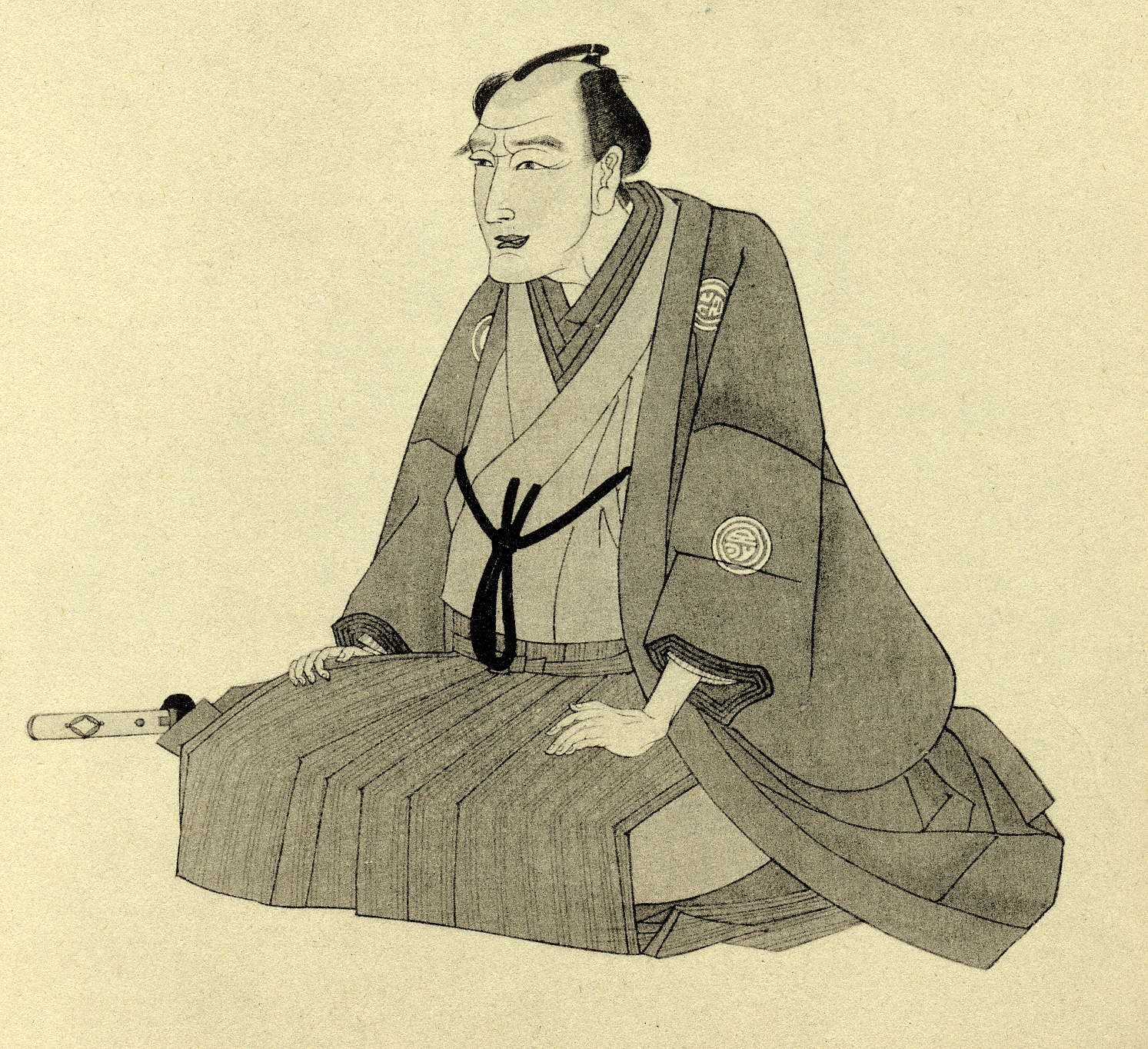
Depiction of Santō Kyōden

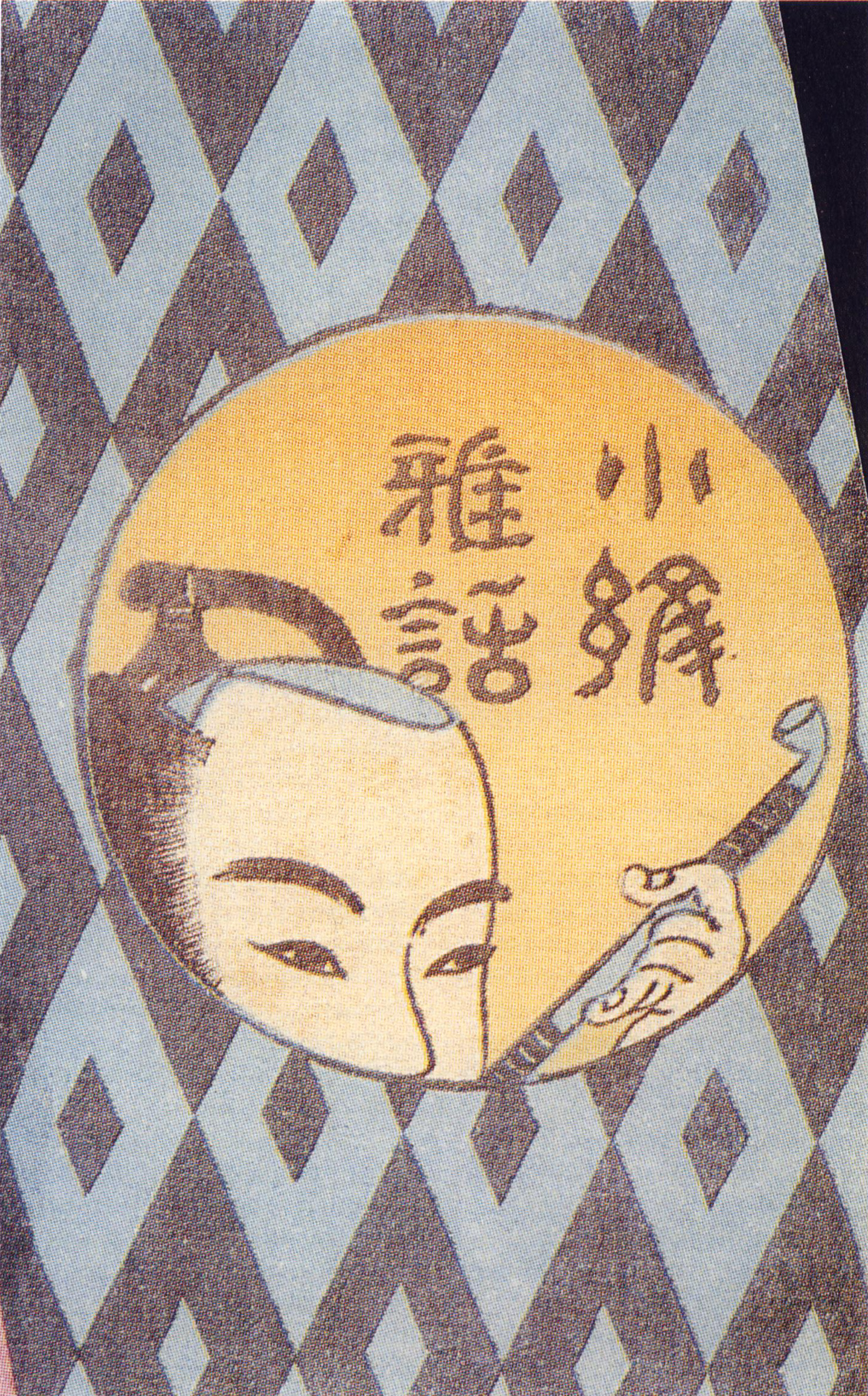
Cover of the Komon gawa (小紋訝話; "Elegant chats on fabric design"), 1790

Santō Kyōden (山東 京伝; Japanese pronunciation: [sä̀ń.tó̞ó̞ | k̟ʲj̊ò̞ó̞.dé̞ɴ́, -tó̞ó̞ (|) k̟ʲj̊ó̞ó̞.dé̞ɴ́, -tó̞ó̞ k̟ʲj̊ó̞ò̞.dè̞ɴ̀, sä́ń-]; 13 September 1761 Edo – 27 October 1816) was a Japanese artist, writer, and the owner of a tobacco shop during the Edo period. His real name was Iwase Samuru (岩瀬 醒), and he was also known popularly as Kyōya Denzō (京屋 伝蔵). He began his professional career illustrating the works of others before writing his own Kibyōshi and Sharebon, which marked his importance in the history of manga. Within his works, Kyōden often included references to his shop to increase sales. Kyōden's works were affected by the shifting publication laws of the Kansei Reforms, which aimed to punish writers and their publishers for writings related to the Yoshiwara and other things that were deemed to be "harmful to society" at the time by the Tokugawa Bakufu. As a result of his punishment in 1791, Kyōden shifted his writings to the more didactic Yomihon. During the 1790s, Santō Kyōden became a household name, and one of his works could sell as many as 10,000 copies, numbers that were previously unheard of for the time.

== Early life ==
Santō Kyōden was born in Fukagawa, Edo (now Tokyo). The Iwase family, into which he was born, were pawnbrokers. Kyōden was the oldest of four siblings. He had one younger brother, Iwase Momoki (岩瀬 百樹), who later became a famous writer under the name Santō Kyōzan. Kyōden also had two younger sisters named Kinu and Yone. His name as a child was Jintarō.

He first began his studies at the age of nine by reading kusazōshi, specifically aohon "blue books", kurobon "black books", and akahon "red books", and also by copying the works of other authors.

While Kyōden was beginning his studies, he was gifted a desk by his father, Denzaemon, which he would continue to use until he died.

== Literary career ==
Ukiyo-e

Kyōden began his career by studying ukiyo-e or woodblock prints, which typically depicted "the floating world" of the Yoshiwara under Kitao Shigemasa (北尾 重政), and began illustrating kibyōshi under the pseudonym Kitao Masanobu (北尾 政寅). He began his professional career by illustrating the works of other authors.

His visual artwork is held in several museums, including the Harvard Art Museum, the Fine Arts Museum of San Francisco, the Boston Museum of Fine Arts, the University of Michigan Museum of Art, the Portland Art Museum, the British Museum, the Brooklyn Museum, the Yale University Art Gallery, the Art Institute of Chicago, the Minneapolis Institute of Art, the Metropolitan Museum of Art, the Chazen Museum of Art, the Philadelphia Museum of Art, the Los Angeles County Museum of Art, and the Indianapolis Museum of Art.

Kibyōshi

In the 1780s, he began writing kibyōshi or "yellow-covered" picture books under the name Santō Kyōden. Several of these works are written by Santō Kyōden and illustrated by Kitao Masanobu. His works gained popularity in 1785. One of his most popular works during this time was Edo umare uwaki no kabayaki, or "Playboy, Grilled Edo Style" or "Playboy, a la Edo." In this work, the main character, Enjirō, is drawn with a pig's nose that became a distinctive feature of Kyōden's illustrations. It is commonly referred to as the "Kyōden nose." Kyōden often depicts himself and his tobacco shop in his works. At the end of Edo umare uwaki no kabayaki, it turns out that Enjirō commissioned Kyōden to write his story. Kyōden wrote thirteen kibyōshi in 1793. Kyōden continued to write kibyōshi until the eventual decline of the genre due to censorship laws during the Kansei Reforms.

Sharebon

Kyōden's first sharebon or "book of manners" was published in 1785. Sharebon acted as guidebooks for how to act in the Yoshiwara. In 1789, Kyōden was punished for his illustrations in Koku bykau mizukagami by Ishibe Kinko. This work displeased authorities and resulted in Kyōden being fined for his illustrations. Following his punishment, Kyōden continued to illustrate, but only his own works. This was not the only punishment Kyōden faced as two years later, Kyōden was handcuffed for fifty days because of three sharebon he wrote. Although there are disagreements as to what the government had an issue with. David Atherton, assistant Professor of East Asian languages and civilizations at Harvard University, in his essay The Author as Protagonist claims that the works were "deemed to contain indecent material" and Kyōden's punishment reflected a "moral connection between author and book that differentiated his position from the others that were punished." During the Kansei Reforms, the bakufu tried to hold artists and publishers accountable for works that they considered to be "harmful to society" for various reasons, such as depicting the Yoshiwara. It is believed that his punishment was used to make an example out of him and to scare off smaller, less famous writers from writing offending material. Adam Kern, professor of Japanese literature and visual culture at the University of Wisconsin, in his extensive thesis, Blowing Smoke: Tobacco pouches, literary squibs, and authorial puffery in the pictorial comic fiction, argues that Kyōden was punished not because of the material present within Kyōden's sharebon, but because of a technicality. Due to the nature of these types of works, writers and publishers would often omit their names. During the Kansei Reforms, however, writers and publishers were required to display their names on the cover of the book, something which Kyōden and had failed to do with the three offending sharebon. However, these rules were rarely enforced and thus inconsistent as a result.

Kyōden was not the only one punished, however, Kyōden's father was also reprimanded. The two censors who had approved the books were not only fined, but they were also banished from Edo. The publisher of Kyōden's three offending works, Tsutaya Jūzaburō (also commonly referred to as Tsutaju), had half of his assets seized by the government as Kyōden's works violated publishing edicts during the Kansei Reforms. Immediately following his punishment, Tsutaju issued a public apology and admitted that he pressured Kyōden into releasing those works. Kyōden himself was hesitant in releasing the work due to the contents. It would seem that Kyōden was trying to avoid punishment, as the punishment he faced two years ago was still fresh in his mind. In Tsutaju's preface, majime naru kojo to Kyōden's Hakoiri musume men'ya ningyo, Tsutaju also implied that this incident deeply upset Kyōden to the point where he wanted to take a temporary break from writing. Ironically, this caused sales of Kyōden's works to increase because rumors spread that Kyōden was never going to write again, and Tsutaju capitalized on these rumors by reissuing second editions of Kyōden's most popular kibyoshi. As a result, Kyōden stopped writing gesaku or "playful writings" shortly thereafter.

Yomihon

Following his punishment in 1791, Kyōden shifted to yomihon or "books for reading." Yomihon are known for being large scale and for being more dramatic and didactic rather than episodic and humorous like many of the works Kyōden had previously written. Kyōden's first yomihon was Tzuzoku Taiseiden or the "Popular Biography of Confucius." In the autumn of that year, Kyokutei Bakin, who would later go on to write Nansō Satomi Hakkenden, or "Tale of Eight Dogs," was made Kyōden's apprentice.

Overall career

It is estimated that over the course of Kyōden's career, Kyōden was involved in approximately 200 unique pieces. He is estimated to have written 125 of them himself. Although this number may be bloated because reissues may be included as well. The way in which Kyōden was paid for his writings was different from the way in which other writers at the time were paid. Most authors of the time were paid a "nominal fee" if their works were to gain popularity, but Kyōden was paid "regularly on a manuscript-for-fee basis." The problem with this, however, was that when Tsutaju reissued second editions of Kyōden's most famous works, he did not get paid for those, because he was only paid for the manuscript. Adam Kern argues that most of the writers during this time were more concerned with establishing themselves as an identifiable brand first and then writing derivative literature. Within his works, Kyōden would present the image he wanted his readers to have of him as a writer. He would describe in detail the struggles he faced, such as struggling to meet deadlines and trying to constantly produce new writings for his publishers. There is great contention as to whether pieces written by Kyōden and other writers were plagiarized; however, Kern argues that it was conventional at the time for works to be derivative and that Kyōden "appreciated this predicament, reveled in it, and even flaunted it in his kibyōshi."

== Tobacco shop ==
Advertisements and Promotions

Kyōden was not only an established author. Kyōden was also the owner of a successful tobacco shop named "Kyōya Denzō's Shop" that opened in the autumn of 1793 in Ginza. One way Kyōden was able to increase sales was by placing advertisements for his shop within his writings. Although this is common practice today, this was a new development in Japan at the time. In order for Kyōden to differentiate that from his writing, he would put a box around his advertisements and announce, "this is an advertisement." Even his pseudonym, Santō Kyōden, contains a reference to the location of his tobacco shop. To means "to the East" of san, "the mountains," in kyō or "Kyōbashi." Den is a reference to his status as a merchant named "Denzaburo."

Kyōden was also able to capitalize on his celebrity status to draw customers to his shop. As Adam Kern states, "most denizens of Edo in late eighteenth-century and early nineteenth-century Japan would have recognized the Kyōden name as that of the best-selling author of numerous genres of light fiction." This is why Kyōden made sure to establish himself as a brand before he opened his shop so that people would be drawn to the shop to have a chance of meeting "Japan's first celebrity writer." However, it seems that Kyōden left the day-to-day activities to his father while he would lock himself in his office on the second floor to continue writing.

Kyōden faced competition two years after he opened his shop as other shops began making knock-offs of his tobacco pouches. One of the ways Kyōden was able to keep customers from visiting his cheaper competitors was through his use of advertisements. In response to his competitors’ knock-offs of his products, Kyōden began giving out handbills with rebuses, or puzzles where words are represented through both pictures and letters. However, it is reported by contemporaries that his profits were not actually increased by the use of these handbills and that, for Kyōden, merchandising was a hobby. What makes Kyōden's advertisements stand out from others at the time is a strategy he employs called mitate or "double seeing." Just reading through his advertisement, would make it seem no different from any other advertisement today as it consists of honorific language to address new and old, and any potential customers, and explains what new items he has in stock. However, in Japanese, one of his advertisements reads "announcing [the goods] on sale this weekend" (kono setsu uridashi mōshi sōrō). The word mōshi is a formal way of expressing the speaker's respect for the listener. However, Kyōden uses mitate in his illustration by having the phrase "mōshi mōshi" or "hey there!" being said by a streetwalker to potential customers. Charlotte Eubanks, a professor of comparative literature, Japanese, and Asian studies at Penn State University, argues in her article Visual vernacular: rebus, reading and urban culture in early modern Japan that in setting up his advertisements this way Kyōden "takes the distant and makes it close, turning the pandering tone of the business solicitation into a shared joke, bringing the niceties of language down to street level, and asserting the novel appeal of the vulgar." In juxtaposing these two ideas together, Kyōden is able to take what would've been a straightforward and plain advertisement and turn it into something more memorable and do so in a way that would appeal to common folk at the time. In Japanese, there were two terms used to describe "high" and "low" writings, those being "ga" and "zoku." Kyōden's advertisement employs mitate by combining the higher, more formal language with the lower, less refined streetwalker. The rebus was also a way for Kyōden to get around censorship laws enacted during the Kansei Reforms.

Goods at his shop

The goods that were sold at Kyōden's tobacco shop include tobacco pipes, smoke pouches, and other smoking related goods. However, his store also sold other things that aren't smoking related. He also sold a "cure-all pill" called tokushogan and "reader's pills." These "reading pills" became a mainstay of his shop. Kyōden also sold paper products.

== Kyōden and the Yoshiwara ==
It is believed that Santō Kyōden had first visited the Yoshiwara, or Red-light district, sometime between 1776 and 1780. Because the Yoshiwara was separated from the rest of Edo by one entrance/exit, the Yoshiwara developed its own customs, language, traditions, and fashion, which artists and writers alike used as a backdrop for their works. Kyōden was one writer and artist who drew heavily on the Yoshiwara, for inspiration within his works. He would often depict contemporary courtesans in both his illustrations and in his writings. He also frequented the Yoshiwara, and it was in the red-light district where Kyōden met both of his wives. Kyōden was one of the few men of the time who was able to achieve the status of tsū. According to Sumie Jones, a professor of East Asian Languages and cultures at Indiana University, tsū were men "who were regarded as true Edokko" (natives of Edo) who "displayed their style and wealth as clients at Yoshiwara and other pleasure districts." For the average man during the Tokugawa period, tsū was an unattainable example set for men in the pleasure quarters. Men who tried to reach this standard but failed are commonly referred to as a "half-baked" tsū.

Yoshiwara in his works

One of Kitao Masanobu's most enduring illustrations is his Shin bijin awase jihitsu no kagami, or "The New Beauties' Competition (of Yoshiwara)." This work features illustrations of fourteen real, famous courtesans and poems they composed. While this isn't anything impressive today, the idea of "affixing a courtesan's name to her portrait" was a recent innovation, according to Adam Kern. On top of this, Kern also states that it seems that collecting courtesans autographs had become a "fashionable hobby" of the time and the letters within Kyōden's work had become one of the "most sought-after" mementos of the Yoshiwara. The reason this became so sought-after is because this is something the average person at the time would not have been able to afford and this would allow them to experience it as well.

Another instance where Kyōden references the Yoshiwara is in his kibyōshi Edo umare no kabayaki. Within his work, the main character Enjirō pays off many different people, including news criers and numerous Geisha to try and spread the word that he is a tsū. However, no one in the story believes his silly antics. He frequently visits the Yoshiwara and commissions many courtesans to pretend to fall in love with him, but none of them actually do so. At the end of this story, Enjirō commissions his favorite courtesan, Ukina, to pretend to commit a lovers suicide as that was common in stories, but rarely ever happened in real life. The ending of the story is similar to what happened in Kyōden's own life, as Enjirō winds up marrying Ukina and living happily together.

Kyōden's first marriage

Santō Kyōden's first marriage was to Okiku (or Kikuzono) in February 1790. According to Jane Devitt, professor of Japan/Australia relations at the University of Melbourne, Kyōden "married Okiku who completed her indenture at the Ogiya in the Yoshiwara in the winter of 1789." Prior to their marriage in 1786, Kyōden began referring to Okiku by name within his works which he continued to do up until Okiku's death. It is estimated that in 1790, when they got married, Okiku was somewhere between the ages of twenty-six to twenty-nine. However, their marriage, was short-lived, as not even four years after their marriage Okiku died. There are varying accounts as to the cause of her death. Devitt claims her death was caused by a blood clot, but, Adam Kern claims she had a stroke and that is it not known if the stroke was caused by a blood clot or by trauma. It is believed that Okiku passed on in late 1793 and because he was still grieving, Kyōden didn't publish anything in 1795 (he had published works in 1794, but it is believed that he had already finished working on them prior to her death.). Kyokutei Bakin wrote about Kyōden's experience leading up to Okiku's death. According to Bakin, Kyōden was unable to bear seeing his wife in pain and so he instead spent his days at the Yoshiwara where he eventually met his second wife. The is debate as to whether Kyōden was a faithful husband, but as Devitt claims whether he was or wasn't he "did not marry again for seven years." According to Bakin, Okiku wasn't the prettiest woman, but she was a "model wife." After their marriage, Kyōden had depicted Okiku not as a courtesan, but as his wife and according to Kern "every source indicates [their marriage] was a blithe union."

Kyōden's second marriage

It is believed that in 1797, or sometime around then, Kyōden met his second wife, Tamanoi, who later goes by the name Yuri. At the time, Kyōden was forty and Yuri is estimated to have been about twenty-three. She achieved the level of heyamochi, meaning that she had her own room, and she was just below the highest ranking of tayū. According to Bakin in Iwademo no ki, during Yuri's last three years at the Yoshiwara, she hardly had any other customers besides Kyōden. Adam Kern argues this is because "they grew increasingly familiar, to the point that she declined to see other customers." Unlike Okiku, though, Yuri had not yet completed her indenture, so Kyōden paid a sum of twenty ryō to redeem her. Kyōden not only married Yuri, but he also adopted her younger sister, who he gave the name Tsuru. Bakin claims that Kyōden had originally planned on adopting Yuri's younger brother, but he died at the age of twenty. Similar to Okiku, Yuri also made a smooth transition from courtesan to wife. However, their marriage was also cut short, but this time by Kyōden's death.

== Death ==
Before Santō Kyōden's death, Kyōden had been complaining of chest pains. The chest pains began in either 1813 or 1814, and Kyōden complained of the pain when he would go on walks. Kyōden remained indoors until his chest pain was lessened in the summer of 1815. Kyōden then met with several of his friends and attended various gatherings. In July 1816, Kyōden died. Kyokutei Bakin claims that Kyōden overworked himself to death. However, Mizuno Minoru, a researcher of early modern Japanese literature, claims that Kyōden died of a heart attack. There are also disagreements on the events leading up to Kyōden's death. One retelling is that Kyōden was engaged in an argument when his anger overcame him. The second is that Kyōden stayed up late drinking alcohol with his brother and two other poets, and his overexhaustion caught up with him. He was buried in the Eko-in cemetery.

Tobacco shop and Yuri

Following Kyōden's death, Yuri, Kyōden's second wife, struggled to keep Kyōden's tobacco shop afloat. Kyōden's brother Kyōzan moved into Kyōden's house to help her run the business, but according to him and Bakin, Yuri was "maddened with grief." Her condition seemed to deteriorate further after Kyōzan moved in. Bakin stated that the way in which she spoke and behaved was strange. This continued until her death in February 1818. Bakin blamed part of this on Kyōzan, claiming that he drove her to insanity, and he also blamed Kyōzan for squandering the rest of Kyōden's assets from his tobacco shop.

Post-death popularity

Kyōden remained somewhat popular immediately after his death. Kyōden's continued popularity can be seen through the numerous biographies written about him. The first of these was Iwademo no ki by Kyokutei Bakin in 1819. The second is Santō Kyōden ichidaiki, but the author is unknown, and this was published in 1834. Also in 1834, Kyōden was listed as one of the "six immortals" of gesaku by Bokusentei Yukimaro. For the next hundred years, interest in Kyōden and in gesaku declined. There were a few exemptions, such as Santō Kyōden in 1916 by Miyatake Gaikotsu and Koike Tōgorō's Santō Kyōden no kenkyu in 1935.

== Major works ==
Kibyōshi

- Those Familiar Bestsellers (御存商売物, Gozonji no Shōbaimono) (1782)
- Playboy, Roasted à la Edo (江戸生艶気蒲焼, Edo umare uwaki no kabayaki) (1785)
- The Unseamly Silverpiped Swingers (扮接銀煙管, Sogitsugi gingiseru) (1788)

Sharebon

- Musukobeya (令子洞房) (1785)
- A Connoisseur's Words (通言総籬, Tsūgen Sōmagaki) (1787)
- Three Madames and their Dirty Tale (古契三娼, Kokei no Sanshō) (1787)
- Forty-Eight Ways for Seducing Courtesans (傾城買四十八手, Keiseikai Shijūhatte) (1790)
- Shigeshige Chiwa (繁千話) (1790)
- Shikake Bunko (仕懸文庫) (1791)
- Nishiki no Ura (錦之裏) (1791)
- Shōgi Kinuburui (娼妓絹籭) (1791)

Yomihon

- Chūshin Suikoden (忠臣水滸伝) (1799)
- The Tale of the Three Thousand Year Flower (優曇華物語, Udonge Monogatari) (1804)
- Sakura Hime Zenden Akebono no Zōshi (桜姫全伝曙草子) (1805)

Historical Works

- Kinsei Kiseki-kō (近世奇跡考) (1804)
- Curios (骨董集, kottōshū) (1814–15)

== Other names ==
It was common for authors and illustrators to write and illustrate under a number of different aliases depending on what genre they were writing. Santō Kyōden was one such writer and illustrator that used a host of different names.

- In Kyōka, or "mad-verse" poetry he went by the name of Migaru no Orisuke.
- With his ukiyo-e and book illustrations, he went by any one of the following names: Kitao Masanobu, Kitao Rissai Masanobu, Kitao Sessai Masanobu, or simply Masanobu.
- His later, archaic works before his death are written under the name Seisei Rōjin.
