= Amefurikozō =

Type of Japanese Yōkai

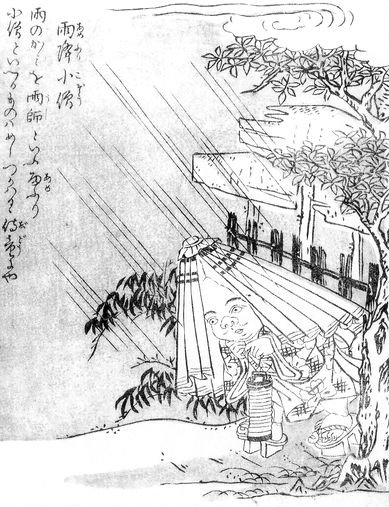
"Amefurikozō" from the Konjaku Gazu Zoku Hyakki by Sekien Toriyama

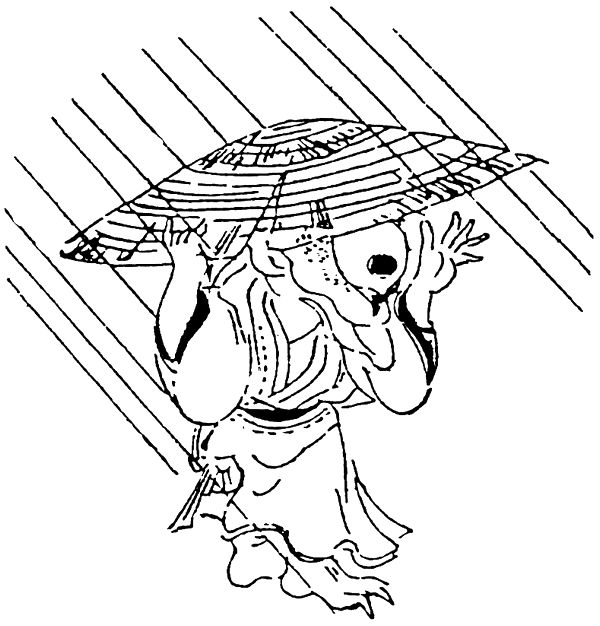
The amefurikozō that appeared in "Gozonji no Bakemono" illustrated by Utagawa Toyokuni

Amefurikozō (雨降小僧, 雨降り小僧) is a type of Japanese yōkai. There is a depiction of this yōkai in Sekien Toriyama's collection of yōkai drawing the Konjaku Gazu Zoku Hyakki, and they can also be seen in the kibyōshi among other publications of the same era.

== Classics ==
In the Konjaku Gazu Zoku Hyakki it wears a Japanese umbrella with its central pole missing, and it is depicted possessing a paper lantern. In the explanatory text, it says, "speaking of the rain god Ushi, there is the amefurikozō, who works as its jidō. (雨のかみを雨師（ushi）といふ 雨ふり小僧といへるものは めしつかはるる侍童（jidō）にや. Ame no kami o ame-shi (ushi) to ifu amefuri kozō to iheru mono wa meshitsu ka wa ruru (jidō) niya.)", stating that they are the jidō (children employed by the nobility) of the Chinese god of rain "Ushi".

Since Ushi (雨師) is an honorary title of the nobility (大人, "ushi"), and since jidō (侍童) can be understood as jidō (児童) meaning "children", there is the interpretation that it is a yōkai depicted using a play on words "a child employed by an adult".

In the kibyōshi of the Edo period, just like the popular kibyōshi character tōfu-kozō, they appear as yōkai that take on the role of servants. In the kibyōshi "Gozonji no Bakemono (御存之化物)" by Jihinari Sakuragawa and illustrated by Utagawa Toyokuni published in Kansei 4 (1792), when a man walks on a rainy night, a one-eyed amefurikozō wearing a bamboo kasa would step up possessing something in both its hands. Since they appear on rainy nights, and since they possess something in both hands, there is the interpretation that they can be understood as tōfu-kozō who also appears on rainy nights possessing tōfu.

== Modern ==
According to yōkai literature published after the Showa and Heisei eras, there are theories that if one were to steal the umbrella from an amefurikozō and wear it, one would not be able to take it off; and that amefurikozō make it shower and delight at seeing people get troubled. According to the explanation at Mizuki Shigeru Road in Sakaiminato, Tottori Prefecture, the amefurikozō would be the one with the role of adjusting rain, something that is greatly related to the work and life of all living things.

In Norio Yamada's writing titled "Tōhoku Kaidan no Tabi", in the part titled "Amefurikozō", there is a story where at Sennin Pass in Kamihei District, Iwate Prefecture, a fox (kitsune) requested to an amefurikozō, "I shall be performing a fox's wedding (kitsune no yomeiri), so please make the rain fall," and when the kozō waved a paper lantern that it has making the rain suddenly fall, and during that time the fox's wedding was performed.

== See also ==
- List of legendary creatures from Japan
