= Enchanted forest =

Locative folklore motif and fantasy trope

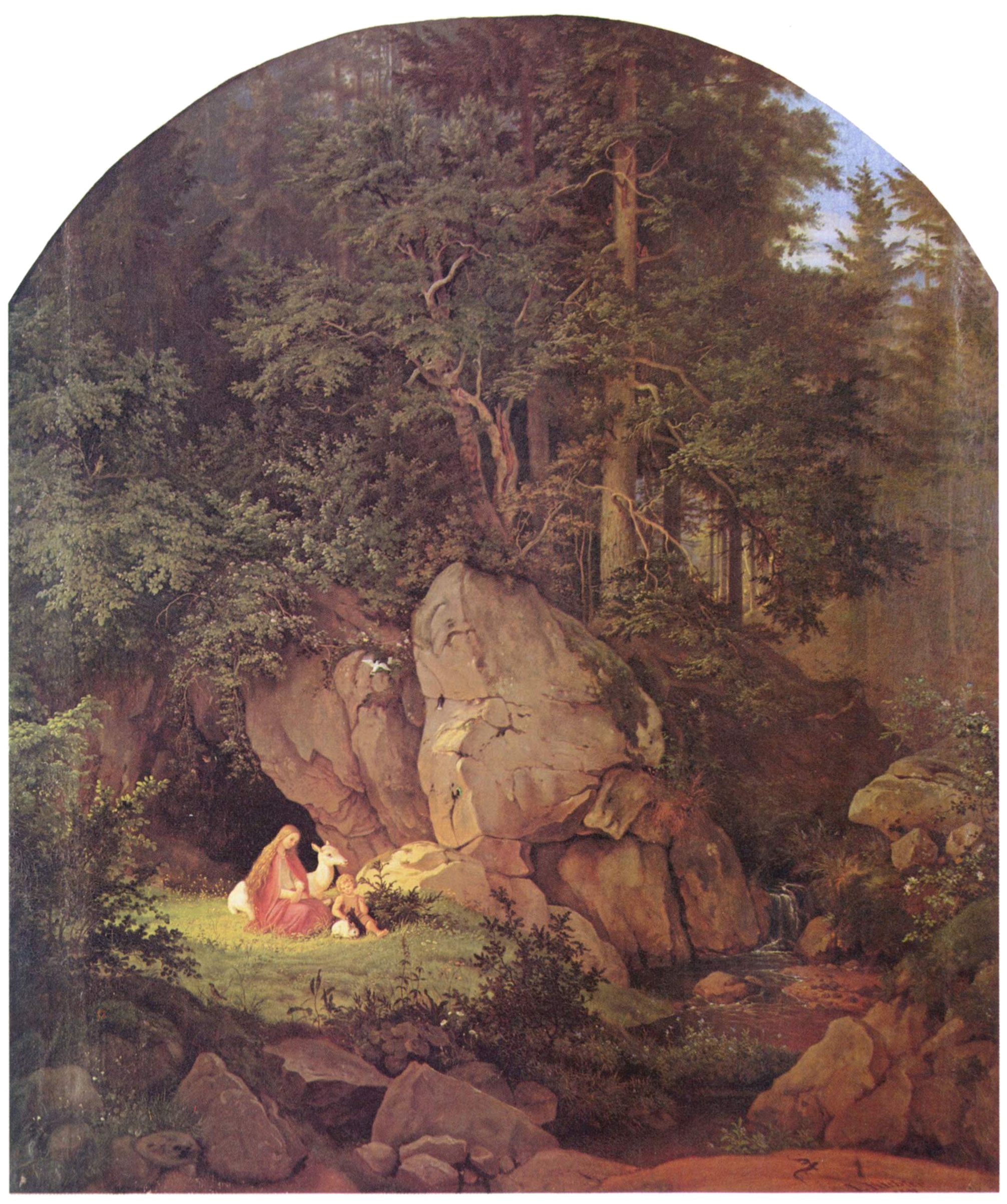
"Genoveva in the Forest Seclusion" by Adrian Ludwig Richter – a refuge and a magical deer

In folklore and fantasy, an enchanted forest is a forest under, or containing, enchantments. Such forests are described in the oldest folklore from regions where forests are common and occur throughout the centuries to modern works of fantasy. They represent places unknown to the characters, and situations of liminality and transformation. The forest can feature as a place of threatening danger, or one of refuge, or a chance at adventure, and in many cases all three.

== Folktales ==
The forest as a place of magic and danger is found among folklore wherever the natural state of wild land is forest: a forest is a location beyond which people normally travel, where strange things might occur, and strange people might live, the home of monsters, witches, and fairies. Peasants who seldom if ever traveled far from their villages could not conclusively say that it was impossible that an ogre could live an hour away. Hence, in fairy tales, Hansel and Gretel found a cannibalistic witch in the forest; Vasilissa the Beautiful encountered Baba Yaga herself; Molly Whuppie and her sisters ran into a giant. It was in a forest that the king of The Grateful Prince lost his way, and rashly promised his child for aid, where the heroines, and their wicked stepsisters, of The Three Little Men in the Wood and The Enchanted Wreath met magical tests, and where Brother and Sister found the streams that their evil stepmother had enchanted. In Beauty and the Beast, Belle's father is lost in the forest when he finds the Beast's castle. The evil cat-spirits of Schippeitaro live in the forest.

Indeed, in Grimm's Fairy Tales, the hero always goes into the forest. It is not itself enchanted, but it contains enchantments and, being outside normal human experience, acts as a place of transformation. The German fairy tale has an unusual tendency to take place in the forest; even such neighboring countries as France or Italy are less likely to have fairy tales situated in the forest.

Even in folklore, forests can also be places of magical refuge. Snow White found refuge with dwarfs from her stepmother, The Girl Without Hands found a hut to stay in when she had been slandered to her husband, and Genevieve of Brabant found not only a refuge from slander but a doe magically came to her aid. Even Brother and Sister hid in the forest after their stepmother turned the brother into a deer.

At other times, the marvels they meet are beneficial. In the forest, the hero of a fairy tale can meet and have mercy on talking animals that aid him. The king in many variants of the ballad The Famous Flower of Serving-Men finds an enchanted hind that leads him astray uncanny, but it brings him to a talking bird that reveals to him a murder and that a servant of his is actually a woman, whom the king then marries. It is in the forest that the dwarf of Rumpelstiltskin and the fairy of Whuppity Stoorie reveal their true names and therefore the heroines of those tales have a way to free themselves. In Schippeitaro, the cats reveal their fear of the dog Schippeitaro when the hero of the tale spends the night in the forest.

The creatures of the forest need not be magical to have much the same effect; Robin Hood and the Green Man, living in the greenwood, has affinities to the enchanted forest. Even in fairy tales, robbers may serve the roles of magical beings; in an Italian variant of Snow White, Bella Venezia, the heroine takes refuge not with dwarfs but with robbers.

== Mythology ==
The danger of the folkloric forest is an opportunity for the heroes of legend. Among the oldest of all recorded tales, the Sumerian Epic of Gilgamesh recounts how the heroes Gilgamesh and Enkidu traveled to the Cedar Forest to fight the monsters there and be the first to cut down its trees. In Norse myth and legend, Myrkviðr (or Mirkwood) was dark and dangerous forest that separated various lands; heroes and even gods had to traverse it with difficulty.

Romans referred to the Hercynian Forest, in Germania, as an enchanted place; though most references in their works are to geography, Julius Caesar mentioned unicorns said to live there, and Pliny the Elder, birds with feathers that glowed.

== Medieval romance ==
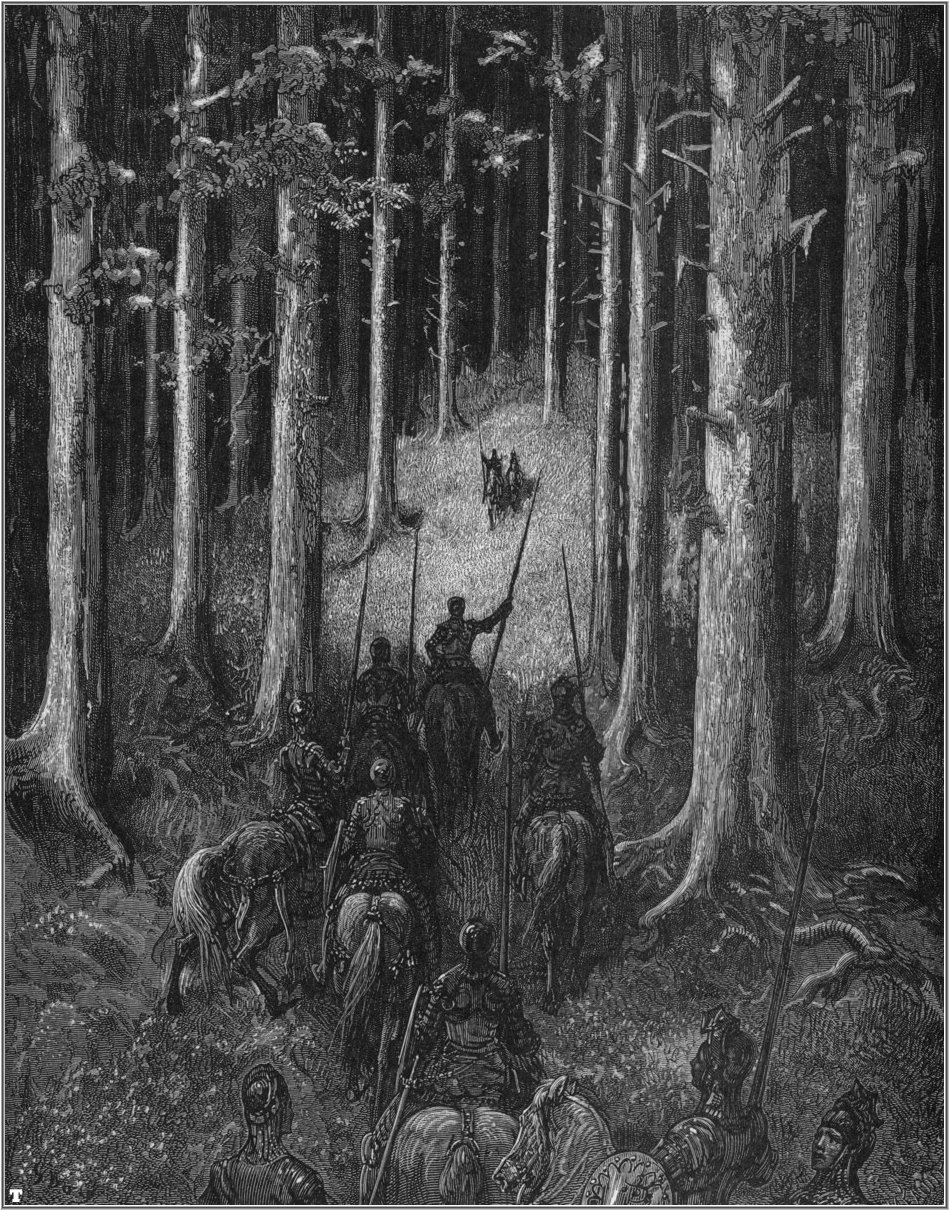
Gustave Doré’s illustration to Orlando Furioso: a knight and his men see a knight and lady approach in the forest

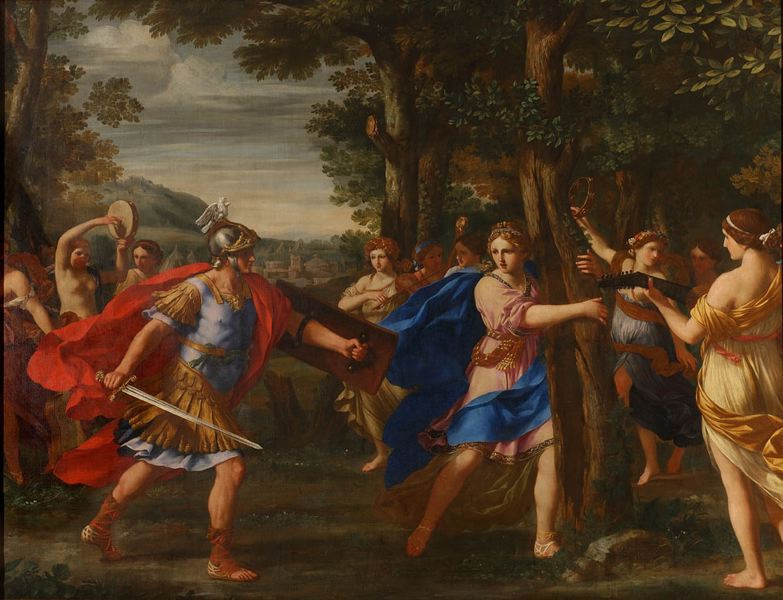
Giacinto Gimignani, Rinaldo and Armida meet in the enchanted forest in Jerusalem Delivered

The figure of an enchanted forest was taken up into chivalric romances; the knight-errant would wander in a trackless forest in search of adventure. As in the fairy tales, he could easily find marvels that would be disbelieved closer to home. John Milton wrote in Paradise Regained (Bk ii. 359) of "Fairy damsels met in forest wide / By knights of Logres, or of Lyones," and such ladies could be not only magical aid to the knight, but ladies for courtly love. Huon of Bordeaux met the fairy king Oberon in the forest. Guillaume de Palerme hid there with the princess he loved, and found a werewolf who would aid him. In Valentine and Orson, the Queen is sent into exile and so forced to give birth in the woods; one child, taken by a bear, turns to a wild man of the woods, who later aids Valentine, his long-lost brother. In the "Dolopathos" variant of the Swan Children, a lord finds a mysterious woman – clearly a swan maiden or fairy – in an enchanted forest and marries her. Genevieve of Brabant, having rebuffed a would-be lover and found herself accused of adultery by him, escaped to the forest.

This forest could easily bewilder the knights. Despite many references to its pathlessness, the forest repeatedly confronts knights with forks and crossroads, of a labyrinthine complexity. The significance of their encounters is often explained to the knights – particularly those searching for the Holy Grail – by hermits acting as wise old men – or women. Still, despite their perils and chances of error, such forests are places where the knights may become worthy and find the object of their quest; one romance has a maiden urging Sir Lancelot on his quest for the Holy Grail, "which quickens with life and greenness like the forest." Dante Alighieri used this image in the opening of the Divine Comedy story Inferno, where he depicted his state as allegorically being lost in a dark wood.

== Renaissance works ==
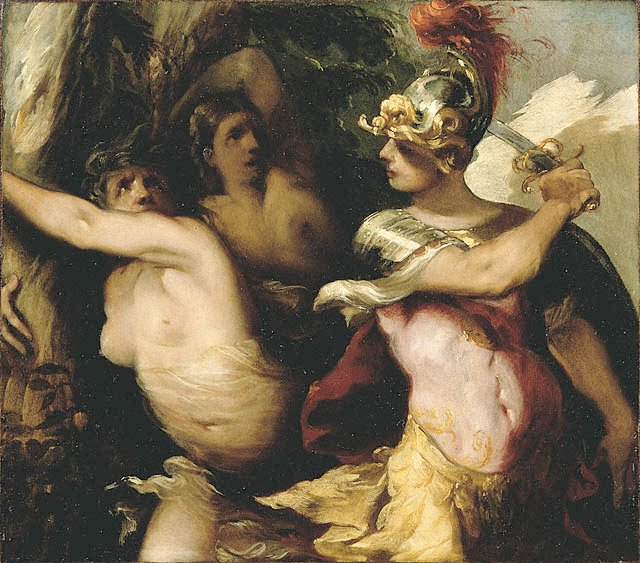
Rinaldo's Conquest of the Enchanted Forest, Francesco Maffei, a scene from Jerusalem Delivered by Torquato Tasso (1581)

In the Renaissance, both Orlando Furioso and The Faerie Queene had knight-errants who traveled in the woods. In Jerusalem Delivered by Torquato Tasso (1581), enchantments placed on the only forest near Jerusalem prevent the Crusaders from constructing siege engines for most of the epic poem, until they are broken by Rinaldo.

While these works were being written, expanding geographical knowledge, and the decrease of woodland for farmland, meant the decrease of forests that could be presumed magical. In A Midsummer Night's Dream, William Shakespeare wrote of a forest that was enchanted specifically by the presence of Oberon and Titania, the fairy king and queen; like many forests in Shakespeare's works, it becomes a place of metamorphosis and resolution. Others of his plays, such as As You Like It, take place in a forest, which contains no enchantments but acts much as the forest of folklore.

== Known inhabitants and traits ==
Often forests will be the home of dragons, dwarves, elves, vampires, werewolves, fairies, nymphs, giants, gnomes, satyrs, fauns, goblins, orcs, trolls, slugfolk, dark elves, leprechauns, halflings, centaurs, half-elves, skinwalkers, shapeshifters, talking animals, nymphs, water demons, nereids, dryads, ogres, dragonfolk, and unicorns.

Various hunting deities (Artemis, Diana, Neith, Skaði, etc.) also often use the forest as hunting grounds. Any mortals brave enough or foolish enough to seek them out would often become prey for them to hunt and kill for sport.

In the modern era, people have reported alleged sightings of various cryptids living within the forest such as the Bigfoot and the Pope Lick Monster to name a few.

There may be trees that talk or with branches that will push people off their horses, thorny bushes which will open to let people in but close and leave people stuck inside, and other plants that move or turn into animals at night, or the like.

Some stories have powerful sorcerers, wizards, and witches, both good and evil living somewhere in the depths of the forest.

In some stories the forest itself was sometimes described as being almost alive and sapient in some shape or form instinctively protecting itself and its inhabitants whenever it senses danger approaching. In other stories it appears to be capable of cutting itself off almost entirely from the outside world for long periods of time preventing anyone from going in or out.

In more recent years, there have been several horror films that have taken the concept of the Enchanted Forest and have made their own spins on it. Arguably one of the most notable examples of this is in the Wrong Turn franchise in which the forest is populated by various families of deformed cannibals who hunt and kill large groups of people for food in horrific ways by using a mixture of traps and weaponry. The reboot film features a centuries-old cult who respond violently to outsiders who intrude on their self-sufficient civilization.

== Modern fantasy ==
The use of enchanted forests shaded into modern fantasy with no distinct breaking point, stemming from the very earliest fantasies.

- In George MacDonald's Phantastes, the hero finds himself in a wood as dark and tangled as Dante's, una selva oscura that blots out sunlight and is utterly still, without any beasts or birdsong.
- The more inviting but no less enchanted forest in The Golden Key borders Fairyland and draws the hero to find the title key at the end of the rainbow.
- In The Wonderful Wizard of Oz, L. Frank Baum depicted the wild and dangerous parts of the Land of Oz as being forested, and indeed, inhabited with animated trees with human-like traits, a common feature in children's literature.
- William T. Cox in his 1910 work Fearsome Creatures of the Lumberwoods based the entire book off of actual forests across North America; however, the author combines these factual locations with fantastic encounters between lumberjacks and mysterious creatures.
- J.R.R. Tolkien made use of forests as representing enchantment and the ancientness of the world: Mirkwood, Fangorn forest, and the Old Forest. He also made use of folklore about trees, such as the willow, believed to uproot themselves and stalk travelers, in Old Man Willow. His elves are strongly associated with forests, especially Mirkwood and Lothlórien. Tom Bombadil has been described by Tolkien scholar Tom Shippey as the genius loci (literally, "a spirit of a place") of the Old Forest, the wooded land bordering the Shire. The Ents act as the forest come to life.
- In Winnie the Pooh, the Hundred Acre Wood is a beautifully scenic forest home to Winnie the Pooh and all of his friends.
- Following J.R.R. Tolkien's work, the enchanted forest is often a magical place in modern fantasy. It continues to be a place unknown to the characters, where strange dangers lurk.
- The Enchanted Forest is particularly close to folklore in fairytale fantasy, featuring in such works as James Thurber's The White Deer and The 13 Clocks.
- In the contemporary fantasy Harry Potter books, the Forbidden Forest near Hogwarts is forbidden because of its magical nature. The home of unicorns, centaurs, and Acromantulas (a race of giant spiders), it continues the tradition of the forest as a place of wild things and danger.
- In Robert Holdstock's Mythago Wood stories, Ryhope Wood is a small but ancient woodland, undisturbed since the Last Glacial Period. Imbued with magic, it defends itself against intrusion with disorientation, and difficult and hostile terrain. Those who win through find themselves in a much, much larger land, populated by myth-images, or mythagos, who are creatures (including animals, monsters and humans) generated from the ancient memories and myths within the subconscious of nearby human minds.These can include such characters as King Arthur, Robin Hood and Herne the Hunter. Further, those who eventually return to the outside find that time passes slower inside the wood. For example, a day may pass in normal time, yet a traveller within the wood may have been there for weeks or longer.
- In Suzanna Clarke's Jonathan Strange and Mr. Norrell, the Raven King's capital city of Newcastle in Northern England was surrounded by four magical woods, with names like Petty Egypt, and St. Sirlow's Blessing. These forests were supposedly enchanted by the Raven King himself to defend his city. They could move around, and supposedly devoured approaching people intending to harm the city. Clarke brings the notion of magical places to life by contrasting this historical account within the story itself, to the actual depictions of magical woods within the story, where the trees themselves can be regarded as friend or foe, and have formed alliances with magicians.
- In My Neighbor Totoro, the forest home of the Totoros is an idyllic place where no harm will come to the heroines of the movies.
- There are variations on enchanted forests in the Spyro series. The Artisans Homeworld In Spyro the Dragon, as well as Summer Forest and Autmn Plains in Spyro 2: Ripto's Rage!, and Sunrise Spring from Spyro: Year of the Dragon are all different forms of magical forests that act as homeworlds.
- In contrast, in the Touhou Project series by Team Shanghai Alice, the Forest of Magic is an extremely dangerous place crawling with youkai.
- In The Legend of Zelda series, the Lost Woods serves as a recurring location. It is a large old-growth forest inhabited by fairies that misleads travelers into going in circles. To find a way through, the player must pick the correct pathway. Otherwise they'll become lost and will be sent back to the forest's entrance. In The Legend of Zelda: Ocarina of Time an orphaned Link starts the game off in the Lost Woods in a village of Kokiri sprites.
- In Naruto, the Forty-Fourth Training Ground, more commonly known as the Forest of Death, is a strange forest filled with hordes of flora and fauna, often gigantic, poisonous — or even more likely, both — hence its name.
- In Once Upon a Time, the Enchanted Forest, which is located in Fairy Tale Land, is the main setting during the first six seasons. It is often shown to viewers in flashbacks of those who lived there ever since the Dark Curse enacted by the Evil Queen and her followers brought them to the Land Without Magic. There is a desert that separates the land from Agrabah, while also being separated from Arendelle, DunBroch, and the Oceanic Realm by seas and a few days ride from Camelot and the Empire. The land is also seen in the series' spin-off Once Upon a Time in Wonderland. During the seventh and final season, the New Enchanted Forest is introduced as its main setting. It is located in New Fairy Tale Land and is separated from Maldonia and New Agrabah and has its version of Wonderland called New Wonderland. This version has elements from the 18th and 19th century mixed with small elements from the Middle Ages as well as French influences. In addition, there is a hierarchy in the kingdoms like a "federal" kingdom and "federated" kingdoms as the unnamed King seems to rule all over the New Enchanted Forest. It is because of the king and Lady Rapunzel Tremaine that there is a resistance against them. By the end of the series, both Enchanted Forests become part of the United Realms upon combining with Storybrooke, the other Fairy Tale Land locations, the Land of Oz, the Land of Untold Stories, Neverland, and the Wish Realm.
- The Enchanted Forest is featured in Ever After High. It is a location in the Fairytale World that is located next to Ever After High and the Village of Book End. The students of Ever After High hang out there often....Especially when the students need time alone. For this purpose, there's a gazebo located deep in the forest.
- In My Little Pony: Friendship is Magic, the Everfree Forest is depicted as an enchanted forest grove adjacent to Ponyville. The forest is largely uninhabitable, being a saturated "hotspot" of unpredictable wild magic induced genetic mutations and dangerous legendary creatures and is regarded by ponies as the most hostile region within Equestria's borders.
- In Frozen 2, the Enchanted Forest is home to spirits of fire, earth, wind and water. Elsa journeys there to find the origins of her powers and end the feud between Arendalle and the forests native people.
- In Mickey Mouse Funhouse, there is a variation of the enchanted forest called the Enchanted Rainforest. It is depicted as being sentient and consists of different jungle animals. The Enchanted Rainforest was first visited in the episode "Minnie Goes Ape" where Minnie Mouse had to return Pinky the Gorilla (vocal effects provided by Kaitlyn Robrock) to her parents.
- In the Pokemon franchise, most of the series focuses on the adventures of Pokémon trainers who regularly explore or travel through vast untamed wildernesses inhabited by various different species of Pokémon some of whom are friendly while others are decidedly not.

== See also ==
- Fairytale Forest
- Sacred grove
- Trees in mythology
