= Gōkan =

Japanese illustrated literature

Gōkan (合巻) is a variety of Japanese woodblock printed literature under the broader category of picture books known as kusazōshi (草双紙) produced during the late Edo period from circa 1805 to the late nineteenth century. It is a successor of kibyōshi (黄表紙), which featured adult themes that changed significantly in content and style following censorship imposed by the Kansei Reforms. However, in physical form and production much remained the same between the two, such as large images with whitespace filled with narrative text and dialogue composed largely of kana.

Gōkan are typically much lengthier works than their predecessors, with the longest extant example being Shiranui Monogatari, which contains ninety chapters produced between 1849 and 1885. Because of the lengthy nature of the works, individual books were often gathered together and bound into larger volumes, which is reflected in the Japanese term for the genre (lit. "bound volume"). Gōkan, along with the rest of the kusazōshi varieties, belong to the literary genre of Edo literature known as gesaku (戯作).

== History ==
The first piece that explicitly utilizes the term Gōkan is Tōkaidō Matsu no Shiranami written by Shunsuitei Genkō. Although itself classified as a kibyōshi by the Waseda Classics Database, the complete story is a collection of ten books bound into a single volume as shown on the cover, giving a name to the new process. The first author who laid claim to the origination and proliferation of gōkan is Shikitei Sanba. Although not the sole progenitor of gōkan, his work contributed to the staying power of the works in the coming decades.

By far the most studied and best-selling example of gōkan is Ryūtei Tanehiko's Nise Murasaski Inaka Genji. Published from 1829 until 1842 by Senkakudō, the story is a parody of Murasaki Shikibu's Tale of Genji. The setting changes from the Heian Period to the Muromachi Period, with the titular Genji becoming Ashikaga Mitsuuji, the fictional son of Ashikaga Yoshimasa.

By the Meiji era, the production of gōkan was in significant decline due to the emergence and subsequent popularity of newspaper serials. A notable late gōkan work was Takahashi Oden Yasha Monogatari, written by Kanagaki Robun. Initially serialized in his own Kanayomi Shinbun, the work was quickly transferred over to the gōkan format for a lengthier and more in-depth story. This late flourishing of gōkan was primarily reserved for dokufu (毒婦) literature, outlining stories of murderous sensational women.
