= Kyōka Hyaku Monogatari =

Japanese picture book published from 1853

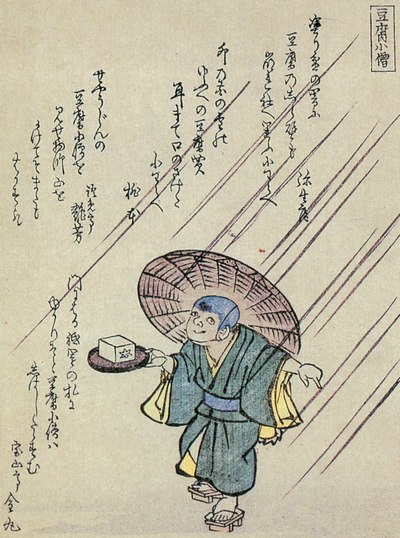
"Tōfu-kozō" from the Kyōka Hyaku Monogatari

The Kyōka Hyaku Monogatari (狂歌百物語) is an e-hon (picture book) on yōkai monsters, published in 1853 (Kaei 6).

As title suggests, it was accompanied by kyōka poetry on each monster.

The book was edited by Tenmei Rōjin (天明老人) aka Jingorō takumi (尽語老内匠) (Note: Or Jingorōjin (尽語老人).), real name Honda Jingorō (本田甚五郎), (Note: The poetry editor's real name was Honda Jingorō, which happened to be the same as the name of a famed master sculptor, so that the editor in jest gave himself the poetic penname "Jingorō takumi" ("master Jingorō ") according to one commentary.) with illustrations by Ryūkansai (竜閑斎) (Note: 龍閑齋 in traditional Chinese or kyūji.) aka Ryūsai Masazumi (竜斎正澄). (Note: Also styled Ryūkansaijin Masasumi (竜斎閑人正澄).)

== Summary ==
The kyōka was extremely prosperous during the Tenmei era (1781–1789), and many kyōka e-hon garnished with colored illustrations were published. Yōkai were enjoyed as the subject of kyōka. The poet Ōta Nanpo imitated the techniques of Hyakumonogatari Kaidankai, where an event was held where he recited a kyōka that included around 100 kinds of yōkai; with the intent of doing it again, he collected together the kyōka, and the book was the result of collecting together only the better of the poems.

As a kyōka with a theme on 96 yōkai, it is divided and collected together based on each yōkai, and it recorded yōkai illustrations in various colored version of yōkai illustrations, and thus it also carries the characteristic of being an illustrated yōkai reference book. The yōkai within this book were humorous existences as the subject of kyōka, and were thus existences that were joked about, it can be seen that yōkai that were once main characters of ghost stories that were to be feared or awed became characters for amusement in the middle of the Edo period.

Koizumi Yakumo also possessed the book, and 48 poems of kyōka that he particularly liked were translated to English under the subject "Goblin Poetry". Later, Yakumo himself also garnished these notes with yōkai illustrations, and was later reproduced and published under the title Yōma Shiwa (妖魔詩話).
