= Whuppity Stoorie =

Scottish fairy tale

Whippitie Stourie (pronounced whuppity stoorie) is a Scottish fairy tale collected by Robert Chambers in Popular Rhymes of Scotland. It is Aarne-Thompson type 500, The Name of the Helper. This categorizes it with Rumpelstiltskin.

== Synopsis ==
A woman's husband went to the fair and never returned; she was left alone with her baby son and owning only a big sow. The sow was about to farrow, and she hoped for a good litter, but one day she went to the pen to find the sow dying. She was distraught, and a fairy woman asked what she would give her if she helped the sow. The woman promised her anything she liked. She saved the sow and demanded the baby. Though she would not listen to any pleas, she did tell the woman that under the fairy laws, she had to wait three days, and the woman could stop her by telling her her name. The woman was distraught the first day, but the second, she went for a walk, and in the forest, she found a quarry where the fairy was spinning and singing that her name was Whuppity Stoorie.

When the fairy came the next day, the woman pleaded with her to take the sow, and then to take herself. The fairy scorned her, asking what she would want with such a woman, and the woman said she knows she is unworthy to tie the shoestrings for Whuppity Stoorie. The fairy woman went screeching away.
