= Akahon =

Japanese literary medium

- Cultural origins: Edo, Japan
- Authors: Various

Related topics
- Kusazōshi, Aohon, Kibyōshi, Kurohon

Akahon can refer to the early literary medium that circulated in Edo-period (1603–1867) Japan, circa 1661–1748, to the akahon manga that was the dominant form of literary entertainment in Japan during the post-WWII period around 1946 to 1950 or to the compilation of past exam papers that aid university applicants in their academic preparation. Early akahon were softcover booklets featuring woodblock printed illustrations. Akahon belonged to a family of coloured books named kusazōshi, which were colour coded by genre. Akahon were distinguished from other kusazōshi by its red cover and coverage of less mature subject matters such as children's tales, fairy tales and folk legends. Akahon were the primary type of book in the kusazōshi style, meaning that in many cases, it was the first interaction with the world of literature for many Japanese children, so publishers would use plentiful illustrations and simple entertaining plots as the focal points to capture the attention of the young Japanese readership.

The more modern akahon manga shared the signature red covers with the early akahon but its content differed due to the advent of the printing press and the influence of foreign media. Akahon manga featured bold colours and well known characters, as disregard to copyright laws was a defining feature of this genre, with authors often blatantly basing their novels off of well-known American characters, such as Disney's Three Little Pigs and Betty Boop.

The compilation of university exam paper that is named akahon is mostly used by university applicants to prepare for their university admission exams. Akahon are typically divided into the different universities they contain the past papers for, with sections in the books further divided into the different test subjects, such as Mathematics, English Studies, Japanese, etc. Many students attend juku, in conjunction with using the akahon resource to familiarise themselves with both the exam format and the content. Since juku are relatively expensive, students looking for extra study materials use akahon as a way of improving their knowledge for the fiercely competitive exams. Akahon can be bought online as well as in many Japanese bookstores.

== Historical origin ==
Much of the understanding of early akahon is dependent upon historical discoveries of these text types. A well-known example of one of these discoveries are Chokuro's books, which were a collection of akahon and other objects that were found sealed in a wooden statue of Bodhisattva Jizo, as a memorial offering by a merchant father to his deceased son. This discovery provided insights about the role of akahon in Edo, such as the range of subject matters that were deemed appropriate for merchant class boys and reinforced the notion that the primary purpose of akahon were to "entertain, rather than to inculcate or instruct".

Akahon were preceded by akakobon ("mini reds") which had the same red cover and similar contents but measured only 4 by 5 inches (10 by 13 cm). Scholars speculate on the reasons why akahon gradually replaced akakobon, with theories spanning from greater commercial viability as a book of bigger format to accommodating more visual-verbal content. An akahon was typically just 10 pages long, though often, groups of up to 3 akahon were collated and bound together with string.

Slowly, akahon would be overshadowed by emerging literary mediums, such as manga. However, akahon cemented its place in Edo-Japan literature, as it was grouped together with other notable text types of kabuki and jōruri to be coined with the term jihon that was seen to be "fashionable literature for a metropolitan audience."

== Kusazōshi ==
Kusazōshi (lit. 'grass books') was the family of children's books to which akahon belonged. There are several explanations for why they are named "grass books." One theory involves the etymology of the Chinese character for grass which has a secondary meaning of "crude", or "coarse", which describes many adults' opinion of kusazōshi at the time as a crass medium that adversely affected the juvenile audience. Another theory is that kusazōshi relates to the "grass style" of calligraphy with which the tales are inscribed. Other examples of kusazōshi include aohon ('blue book'), kibyōshi ('yellow book') and kurohon ('black book'). Out of these three texts, kibyōshi is most notable, as many sources believe that modern manga was a direct descendant of the books with yellow covers. These texts were targeted at more mature audiences and their subject matter reflects this fact, as they covered the darker side of the human condition, such as mortality, infidelity, horror or hopelessness. Although the illustrations still occupied a central position, there was notably a greater didactic presence in these more mature kusazōshi texts and there would often be a philosophical moral to the story subscribing to the ideals of Confucianism or Buddhism, that led academics to conclude that an ulterior motive of kusazōshi was in the education of Japanese children. Soon after, kusazōshi publishers started to lengthen the structure of their stories, incorporating complex heroes and expansive plotlines such that the resultant work had the length of multiple standard kusazōshi leaflets, necessitating the coinage of the new term gokan, meaning "bound volumes".

A common source of literary inspiration of kusazōshi were the otogi-zōshi of the 17th century. Many kusazōshi publishers would adapt and abbreviate the main messages from the otogi-zōshi, preserving the essence of the storyline and morals but presenting their own interpretations of them. In this way, kusazōshi can be seen as a type of social commentary in the way that it re-interpreted the Muromachi-period classics, as it reveals an insight into how society viewed the themes presented in these works.

However, other sources seek to categorize the Edo narrative in a different manner. Kyokutei Bakin disagreed with the division of Japanese literature into colour coded genres and instead, sought to differentiate Edo fiction into the categories of akahon, yomihon, chubon and sharebon. Unlike the kibyōshi, these texts were differentiated by their genre, rather than the maturity level of the audience. For example, the term sharebon can be translated roughly to mean "fashionable humour," and focuses primarily on the pleasure quarters of Kyoto. The text type is distinguishable by the strong presence of an authorial voice which conveys concern for readership and acts as the benchmark upon which expectations of social and behavioural norms are created, the abrogations of which create humour. Yomihon was a text type that, unlike akahon, did not rely heavily on illustrations to entertain its audience and instead, used its characters and the moral situations in which they found themselves entangled in to deliver moralistic lessons to readers.

== Notable akahon ==
An early publisher of many akahon was Urokogataya Magobei, who is known for having published the akahon texts of Bunta the Salt Seller and the Princess Hachikazuki. A common theme of these works is that they are concise reproductions of other prominent works in Edo at the time. Magobei did not produce exclusively using the akahon medium. His works range from the chubon format to obon formats. Publishers would factor in the type of content they were producing, the length of the overall books and also the amount of illustrations they would incorporate in their work in order to choose the colour of the book and thus give the reader a preliminary expectation of the content they would find between the covers. Magobei's second son, Nishimuraya Yohachi, continued his father's legacy, albeit in a different art form. He published kibyōshi rather than akahon, but the didactic content was more or less indistinguishable and in some instances, readers could be forgiven for assuming that he republished his father's work, just with a yellow rather than a red cover.

The Old Yarn of Peach Boy is an example of an akahon that is attributed to the artist Nishimura Shigenobu. In the story, there is a scene of a woman kneeling by the bank of a river and floating towards her is a peach, from which will emerge the titular protagonist of the story. The dominant presence of the illustrations compared to the sparse text is characteristic of the akahon text type. In another scene from Princess Hachikazuki, the queen is shown bestowing jewels upon the head of her daughter on her deathbed and covering them with a large bowl. After the queen dies and the princess attempts to remove the bowl from her head, she discovers that it is stuck fast, giving rise to her name, which translates to "Princess who wears a Bowl on her Head".

In Bunta the Salt Seller, although the story's protagonist, Bunta, is a poor man, who peddles the salt he dries from his local river, his luck changes due to his good deeds. In this scene, he is depicted releasing two mandarin ducks from captivity, who reveal that they are actually a samurai married couple who were transformed by a jealous villain. The samurai proceed to assist Bunta, reversing his fortunes.

== Akahon manga ==
Akahon inspired the contemporary form of media known as manga from its entertainment centered content to its many genre. In fact, early forms of manga were known as "akahon manga," despite the loss of its signature red cover. However, the transition from akahon to manga faced societal and political headwinds. After World War II, Japanese society shunned akahon as a vulgar medium that negatively influenced Japanese youths with violent and erotic themes. These themes are present in the manga categories of seinen and shōnen manga today, although societal values have shifted such that these manga are now appraised on their entertainment value. A common criticism of akahon manga was that they were designed to entice children into paying for them and that they had no real substantive value. Holmberg sums up this view by asserting that for akahon manga, "content was an afterthought". In this comparison of the cover of an akahon manga and its contents, it is evident that the vibrant colour scheme and art design of the cover were not representative of the contents of the manga.

In response to the negative public perception of akahon manga, a new genre of educational manga, known as gakushu, developed. This genre aimed to bridge the gap between education and entertainment for Japanese children, with limited success, due to a lack of public support of the manga. This is most likely due to the conflict between the didactic nature of these manga and the preconceived notion that manga should be enjoyed entirely for its creative and entertaining appeal.

Akahon manga naturally gravitated towards the rental book genre, known as kashi-hon. Consumers were enabled to borrow titles for a small fee from local shops, which can be seen as a "precursor of modern libraries". Postwar akahon manga was available in a number of different avenues; from the aforementioned rental book stores, in candy stores, on the streets by peddlers or from a subscription with Tokyo-based magazines, which were typically issued monthly.

A successful genre of akahon manga was war manga, focusing on past historical periods. Printed media as a medium was limited in its timeliness; commentary on current issues was better suited to the evolving television medium. In response to the growing viewership of television sets, publishers set out to develop their readerships by carving out their own niche; akahon focusing on past historical periods in a documentary style. This approach was successful; akahon manga had devised a way to compete and keep up with the fast pace of television broadcasts. Not only did this configuration and retelling of past historical periods have a commercial success, it was also important for the Japanese people culturally. Facing an uncertain future following the Second World War, the Japanese people found pride in the retelling of their national past, using akahon and other such mediums to paint images of heroic fighter plane pilots and war heroes. This positive reconfiguration served both as a memento of those that gave their lives for the nation and as a positive role model for Japanese youth moving forward into that uncertain future.
