= Kusazōshi =

- Stylistic origins: Woodblock-printed illustrated literature
- Cultural origins: Edo and early Meiji Japan

Subgenres
- Akahon (赤本), aohon (青本), kurohon (黒本), kibyōshi (黄表紙), gōkan (合巻)

Related genres
- Gesaku (戯作)

Kusazōshi (草双紙) is a term that covers various genres of popular woodblock-printed illustrated literature during the Japanese Edo period (1600–1868) and early Meiji era. These works were published in the city of Edo (now Tokyo).

In its broadest sense, kusazōshi includes several genres primarily labelled according the colour of their covers:

- red books (赤本, akahon), aimed at boys and considered vulgar
- blue-green books (青本, aohon), containing summaries of plays, histories, and legends
- black books (黒本, kurohon), "stories adapted from popular dramas, the adventures of folk heroes, great battles, miracles, and tales from Buddhist and Shinto literature"
- vivid yellow covers (黄表紙, kibyōshi)
- and pleasure scrolls (合巻, gōkan), which despite the name were bound, printed books, initially focused on sexual content until the shogunate passed laws restricting explicit materials.

In the narrow sense, kusazōshi may refer specifically to gōkan. Kusazōshi belong to the group of works of popular fiction known as gesaku (戯作).

== Early kusazōshi (up to c. 1775) ==
=== Characteristics of early kusazōshi ===
The term early kusazōshi usually refers to red, black, and blue books, all of which were published before 1775.

At this time, images were considered more important than text. The text itself was mainly written in hiragana, although some kanji also appear. These early works are of low literary value and are often derivative. However, they are often of interest to scholars from other fields, as they provide unique insights into the lives, customs, and interests of ordinary people of the time.

The size of kusazōshi is referred to by the term chūhon, similar to the modern B6 size of paper. The volumes consist of folded sheets of paper bound together, and each sheet is known as a chō (丁).

It is thought that these early works were enjoyed by a wide readership, and were especially appreciated by women and children.

== Later kusazōshi ==
=== Kibyōshi ===
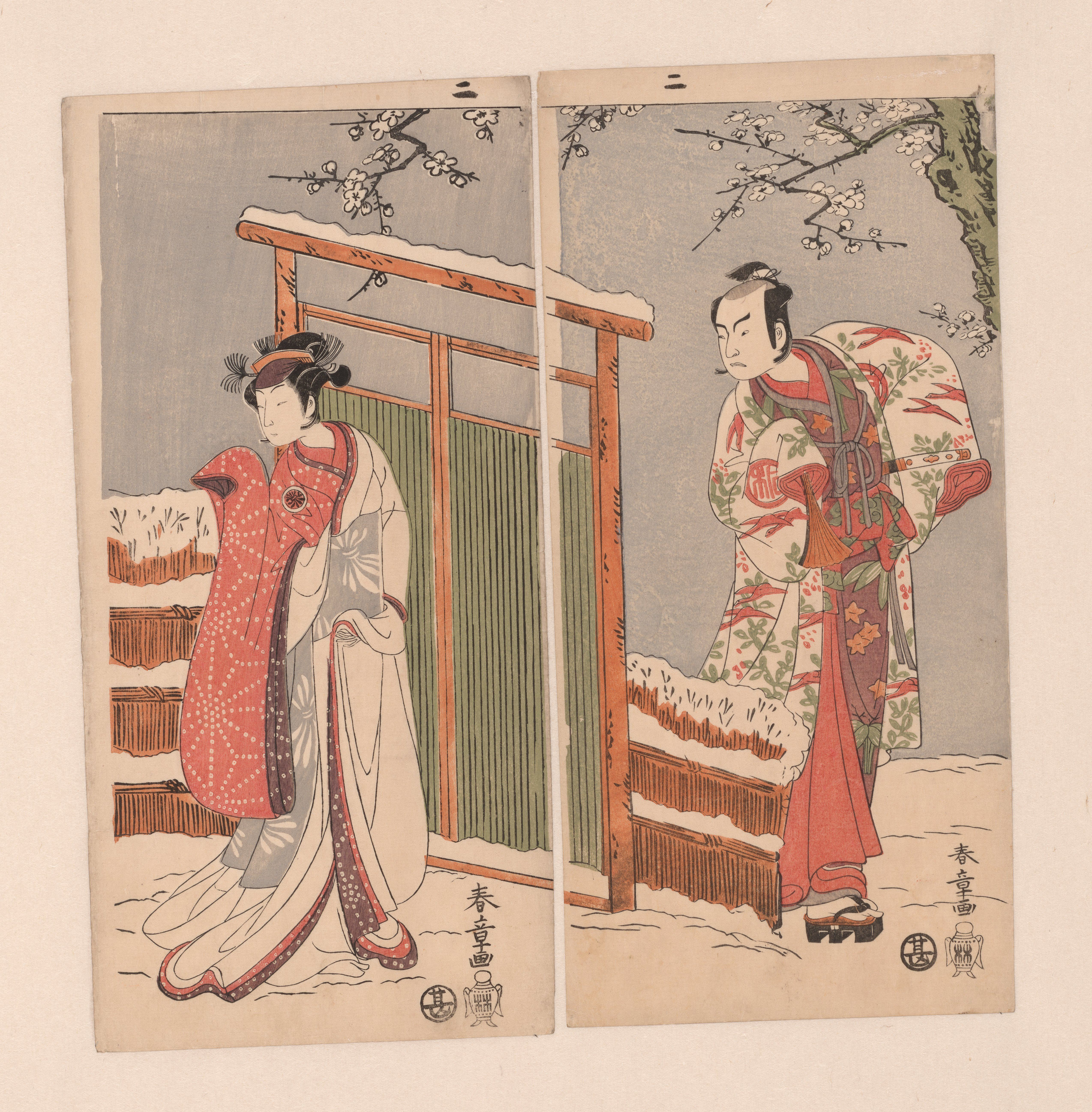
Ginsetsu in Yuki-onna in the Snow, an onnagata actor represented by the Chinese character Rosei in Kinkin Sensei Eiga no Yume

Koikawa Harumachi (恋川春町)'s kibyōshi entitled Kinkin Sensei Eiga no Yume (『金々先生栄花夢』) marked a new era in the development of kusazōshi. Kibyōshi developed out of the earlier aohon, and in fact, the form of the books of these two genres is the same. Works of these genres are conventionally categorised by the date of publication, with works dated before 1775 deemed aohon and those published in or after 1775 kibyōshi.

At first sight, Kinkin Sensei Eiga no Yume appears to be a simple retelling of the Chinese tale of Lu Sheng (廬生, in Japanese: Rosei), a young man who falls asleep while cooking in Handan, the capital of the pre-Qin state of Zhao (403-222 BCE), and dreams of glory, but wakes to find that the millet at his bedside has not even begun to boil. However, in the manner of a roman à clef, the reader is given visual and textual clues that the characters actually represent contemporary figures, such as the onnagata actor Segawa Kikunojō II (瀬川菊之丞（二世). These figures' personal lives are parodied. (Note: For a transcription into modern Japanese characters and a detailed commentary of this work, see: Sugiura Hinako (杉浦日向子) Edo e yōkoso (『江戸へようこそ』): Chikuma Bunko (ちくま文庫), 1989.)

This development profoundly changed the course of the kusazōshi genre; henceforth, it is thought that the works were increasingly read by educated adult men. (Note: For details on how one contemporary observer viewed the development of the genre, see Matsubara Noriko's website on the kusazōshi illustrator and writer Tomikawa Fusanobu, whose pen name was Ginsetsu.)

=== Gōkan ===
Gōkan were longer works, published from around 1807 until 1888.
