= Kibyōshi =

Japanese picture book genre

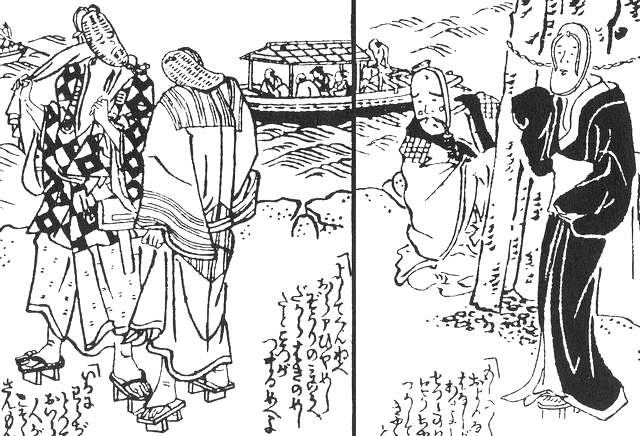
An example of a kibyōshi

Kibyōshi (黄表紙; lit. 'yellow cover') is a genre of Japanese picture book (草双紙, kusazōshi) produced during the middle of the Edo period (1603–1867), from 1775 to the early 19th century, physically identifiable by their yellow-backed covers. Considered to be the first purely adult comic books in Japanese literature, a large picture spanned each page, with descriptive prose and dialogue filling the blank spaces in the image.

Known for its satirical view of and commentary on flaws in contemporary society, these books focused primarily on urban culture, with most early works writing about the pleasure quarters. Typically, kibyōshi were printed with 10 pages in a volume, with the average number of total pages being 30, thus spanning several volumes. Kibyōshi used kana-based vernacular language, and due to the numerous characters and letters in the Japanese language, moveable type printing took longer to catch on in Japan, so Kibyōshi text was carved directly onto the same wood block as the illustration for printing. This allowed for a close and harmonious interaction between image and text, with either a balance of both elements, or text dominating the image.

While kibyōshi may have only been popular for a short period of time, thousands of pieces were published. At its peak in 1784, a record of 92 titles were published. Only a fraction of this genre has been studied, leaving much to still be written.

== History ==
Uda Toshihiko divides the history of kibyōshi into five periods: the incipient pieces (1775–1779), early works (1780–1783), gossip pieces (1784–1787), protest pieces (1788–1790), and post-Kansei Reform works.

=== Incipient works ===
The first major kibyōshi to be published was Kinkin sensei eiga no yume, often translated as Master Flashgold's Splendiferous Dream, by Koikawa Harumachi in 1775. It combined the wit and subject matter of fashionbooks with the graphic nature of the otogi-zōshi to retell the classic noh drama Kantan in contemporary Edo. Harumachi started with a prologue, which was common in fashionbooks but virtually nonexistent in otogi-zōshi. The piece featured realistic dialogue, trendy language, contemporary slang, and modern fashion trends. Through Master Flashgold, Harumachi created not only a new genre but a new market entirely, with 50 to 60 kibyōshi titles estimated to have been published in the following 2 to 3 years. Initially, print runs were limited, but the high demands lead to the number of copies per run, as well as the number of titles per year, to increase. Another noteworthy piece released by Harumachi during this early phase of kibyōshi was Travelogue of Snobby Atelier (Kōmansai angya nikki), which he released the following year in 1776.

=== Early works ===
Continuing his success, Harumachi released many more successful kibyōshi. Other authors were keen to follow his lead, including Santō Kyōden, Shiba Zenkō, Ōta Nanpo, and Hōseidō Kisanji, all of whom got their start during this period. Kisanji's Dreamers the Winners (Miru toku issui no yume) threw him into the popular literature spotlight when published in 1781. Early kibyōshi targeted an educated audience with allusions made to "old-fashioned" theatre such as noh and kyōgen (in Master Flashgold and Travelogue) and kabuki being used as a major plot point in Dreamers.

=== Gossip pieces ===
Kibyōshi published during this time tended to contain many references to contemporary persons, places and events, as well as heavily featuring social satire and some political satire.

Kyōden's Playboy, Roasted à la Edo (Edo umare uwaki no kabayaki; 1785) alluded to modern kabuki actors, authors, poets, and courtesans. It also featured political overtones regarding the class system, as the protagonist Enjirō tried desperately to live the life of the romantic heroes of kabuki plays and ballads, despite being a merchant's son, and by the end of the story, he is firmly put back in his place.

Other popular titles of the day included Pat-a-cake! Pat-a-cake! (Atama tenten ni kuchi ari) by Ōta Nanpo (1784), Horned Words of a Dishheaded Demoness (Hachikazuki hannya no tsuno moji) by Kyōden (1785), and Absent White Lies (Teren itsuwari nashi) by Ōta Nanpo (1786)

=== Protest pieces ===
Kibyōshi from this era reversed the proportion of the gossip pieces to feature mainly political satire with social satire in the background. These kibyōshi were written during an intense period of social unrest, as Japan was afflicted with natural catastrophes such as floods, volcanoes, cold weather, earthquakes, drought, and famine, causing high commodity prices that led an estimated one million citizens to starve to death. Additionally, government corruption, fiscal mismanagement, and the threat of class wars were plaguing the nation.

This era's kibyōshi reflected popular protest sentiments, but the messages were never outright stated in order to get past censors. Instead, authors used a number of literary devices, such as allegory, asides, and reductio ad absurdum to code their true messages. The key to the satire of this period was overtone rather than overt statements.

Popular subjects to satirize included the Tokugawa regime, bad blood between Tanuma Okitsugu and Sano Zanzaemon Masakoto, devaluation of the silver coin, and Neo-Confucian policies advocated during the Kansei Reforms, based on a sampling of major works. While never proven, it is likely that these novels contributed to public outrage and violence.

Famous satirical pieces of this era include Thousand Armed Goddess of Mercy, Julienned (Daihi no senrokuhon) by Zenkō (1785) (satirizing the devaluation of the silver coin), One Spring Night in Edo, One Thousand Gold Pieces (Edo no haru ichiya sen-ryō) by Kyōden (1786) (satirizing Neo-Confucian policies), Tale of the Two Tambours (Jidai sewa nichō tsuzumi) by Kyōden (1788) (satirizing political rivalry between Tanuma Okitsugu and Sano Masakoto), Unseamly Silverpiped Swingers (Sogitsugi gingiseru) by Kyōden (1788), (mocking the government's inability to manage the famine)

- Twin Arts Threshing Device (Bunbu nidō mangokudoshi) by Kisanji (1788) (satirizing the Neo-Confucian idea that samurai must master both literary and martial arts), Probing the Human Cavaties of Mt. Fuji (Fuji no hitoana kenbutsu) by Kyōden (1788) (satirizing Neo-Confucian ideas of usefulness), and Twin Arts, Parroted (Ōmugaeshi bunbu futamichi) by Harumachi (1789) (satirizing the Neo-Confucian idea that samurai must master both literary and martial arts)

=== Post-Kansei Reforms works ===
In 1791, strict censorship laws ended political satire in kibyōshi by prohibiting the authors from touching on current events and politics in their works. All printed material had to be approved by government appointed censors, and printblocks had to be submitted to a censor and stamped "inspected" before the piece could go to print. Additionally, all publications had to clearly state the names of the author, artist, and publisher to prevent unapproved material from being produced.

The government also reprimanded authors of the protest pieces. The first to be punished was Hōseidō Kisanji, who was exiled from Edo. Koikawa Harumachi was contacted, but died before punishment could be enacted. Ōta Nanpo stopped writing, and publisher Tsutaya Jūzaburō had half of his assets confiscated.

Kyōden, undisputedly, was reprimanded most severely. He was brought before the City Magistrate and was forced to recant. He was then shackled and put under house arrest for 50 days. Despite the punishment, he continued to publish kibyōshi for 15 years, but no longer with political overtones. He also released what is considered one of the last masterpieces of the genre, The Night Before Rosei's Dream (Rosei ga yume sono zenjitsu), in 1791. It was written and published after the admonishments of Kisanji, Nanpo, and Harumachi, but before he himself was prosecuted.

The last major author to be punished was Shikitei Sanba. His piece Swaggering Headbands: A Chronicle of Urban Knight-Errantry in a Peaceful Realm (Kyan taiheiki mukō hachimaki), published in 1799, actually incited physical violence. An Edo fire brigade assailed his residence, as well as the residence of his publisher, ironically enough in protest of the negative portrayal of fire brigades in his story.

Due to censorship, works after 1791 lacked the playful spark of earlier kibyōshi. Without political and social satire as fodder, authors were forced to go back to parodying earlier kibyōshi and other written formats.

=== Decline ===
Many scholars agree that the end of the genre came in 1806, though individual pieces continued to trickle out until as late as 1828. While the Kansei Reforms certainly damaged the industry, it is believed this was not solely responsible for the disappearance of the kibyōshi, but rather that it just sped up the process. Some scholars believe the likely cause of the death of the genre was instead the constant attempts by authors to broaden the reader base by appealing to a wider audience.

Initially, kibyōshi were written by educated authors for educated individuals. As authors attempted to expand the reader base across different classes and education levels, the jokes, allusions, and humour were inevitably dumbed down. As author Adam L. Kern notes, "in bending over backwards to expand its readership, the kibyōshi lost its esoteric uniqueness. In this sense, kibyōshi fell victim to its own success."

== Translating kibyōshi ==
There are several popular methods in which kibyōshi are translated. One method used by James T. Araki in the 1970s is described as an illustrated playscript. While not perfect, many translators followed his example and used this format. The main concern with this system is that all the text from the image is neatly divided up to a particular speaker, when, in the original format of kibyōshi, it is difficult to pinpoint exact speakers, as the dialogue floats in the empty spaces of the page. Thus, this format gives the misconception that kibyōshi was straightforward to read. It also creates a disconnect between the text and images by taking the text out of the image, making it seems as if the parts are independent of one another, which looses the interesting way kibyōshi text fit with the images on the page.

Another common method of translation is to replace the original, handwritten text. In the 1920s, Yamaguchi Takeshi replaced the penned text with typescript, but it did not adequately convey the flowing nature of the original script. Sugiura Hinako improved upon this concept when publishing her rendition of Master Flashgold by replacing the sprawling script with her own less curvaceous, more legible handwriting.

== Similar genres ==
Kibyōshi had its roots in earlier illustrated novels, starting with the companion novels. These lightly illustrated novels would slowly evolve into akahon, or "red books", the oldest form of woodblock printed comic books. Akahon tended to be easy-to-read adaptations of children's stories, folk legends, and fairy tales. Thus, the next type of woodblock comics, kurohon, or "black books", feature more complicated retellings of kabuki and puppet plays, heroic legends and military accounts, while still being easy to read. This last genre is from which kibyōshi would directly descend. Early aohon ("blue books") were almost indistinguishable from kurohon, but this genre can be broken into two distinct categories: works that catered to younger, less literate readers and works that catered to cultured adults. The dye used to color the covers of aohon faded with exposure to sunlight into various shades of yellow, which is how these aohon became known as kibyōshi. It is believed the name change occurred after the hype of the genre, as kibyōshi were referred to as aohon as late as 1802.

== Popular authors ==
- Koikawa Harumachi
- Hōseidō Kisanji
- Santō Kyōden
- Ōta Nanpo

== See also ==
- Senryū
- Sharebon
- Manga
- Yellow-back – cheap novels published in Britain in the 19th century.
