= Dōsojin =

Type of Shinto kami

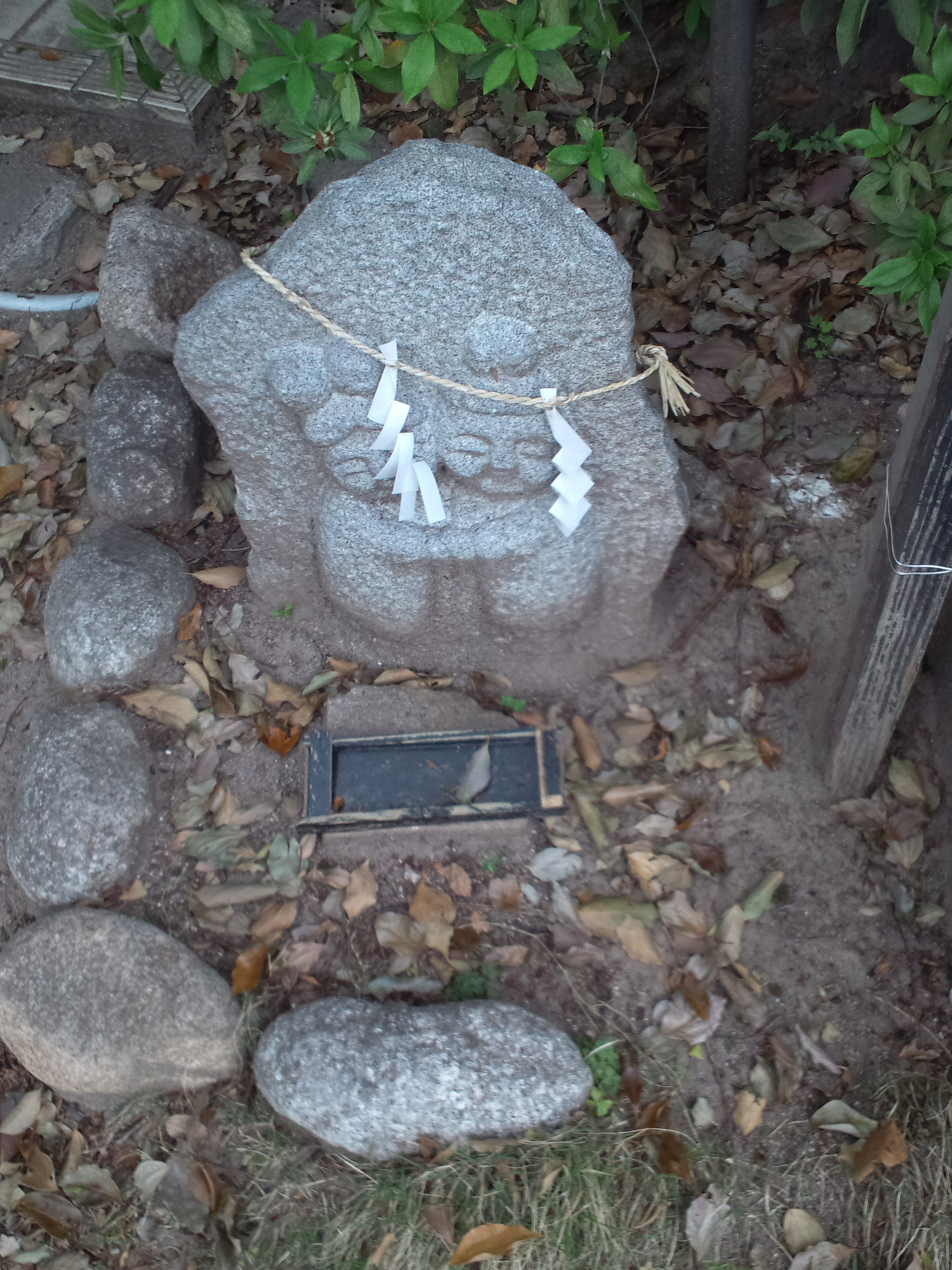
Dōsojin represented as a human couple

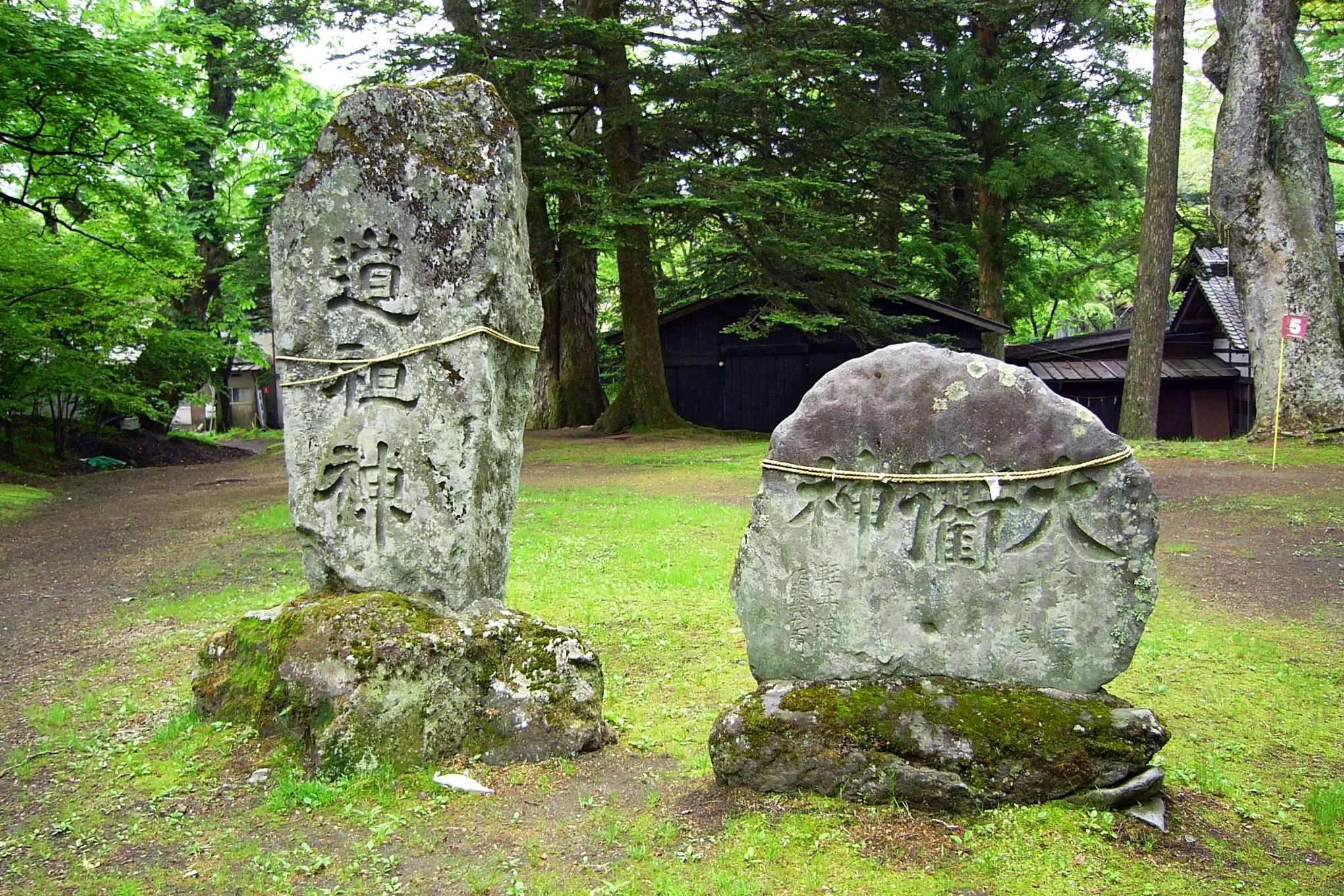
The Dōsojin is on the left

Dōsojin (道祖神) are a class of protective Shinto deities (kami) commonly venerated in eastern Japan, particularly in the Kantō, Chūbu, and Tōhoku regions. They are associated with liminal spaces such as village boundaries, crossroads, and mountain passes, and are believed to ward off evil spirits, epidemics, and other harmful influences that threaten individuals or communities during transitional stages of life.^{2} Dōsojin (道祖神; literally, "road ancestor deity") is a generic name for a type of Shinto kami popularly worshipped in Kantō and neighboring areas in Japan where, as tutelary deities of borders and paths, they are believed to protect travellers, pilgrims, villages, and individuals in "transitional stages" from epidemics and evil spirits. Also called Sae no kami or Sai no kami (障の神・塞の神), Dōrokujin (道陸神) or Shakujin (石神; literally: "stone kami"). Dōsojin are often represented as a human couple, carved male or female genitals, large stones or statues, or even tall poles along a road.

Dōsojin are sometimes housed in small roadside Shinto shrines called hokora. In rural areas Dōsojin can be found at village boundaries, in mountain passes, or along byways, and in urban areas they can be seen at street corners or near bridges. When shaped like a phallus, they are associated with birth, procreation, and marital harmony. When represented as a human couple, Dōsojin are revered as deities of boundaries, roads, travellers, villagers, marriage, fertility, health, agriculture, harvest, procreation, guardianship, defense and protection. They were used as protective markers in village boundaries as fertility symbols for the ensure of the growth of crops.

== Etymology ==
The world Dōsojin (道祖神), in Japanese comes from the words "dō" (道), meaning "road" or "path" and "sojin" (祖神), meaning "ancestor deity" or "guardian spirit".This explains their role as protective deities or liminal guardians associated with travel routes or boundaries in Shinto tradition. Based on practices of ancestor veneration. Other names such as Sae no Kami (障の神) or Sai no Kami (塞の神), which they are translated as "barrier deities" or "obstructing gods,"symbolizes their function as protectors who ward off malevolent forces.While Dōrokujin (道陸神), combines "road" and "land" elements.

== History ==
The origin of Dōsojin stone markers is uncertain and has no exact date. It is known, however, that after Buddhism was introduced, Jizō became a tutelary god of travelers and pilgrims. Scholars generally regard the cult of Dōsojin as rooted in pre-modern, local animistic practices that marked and sacralized liminal spaces such as crossroads, village gates, and mountain passes; early stone markers and posts functioned both as territorial markers and as apotropaic devices intended to intercept malevolent wandering spirits or evil gods before they entered the community.

Ethnographic evidence and local chronicles link Dōsojin with protective responses to contagious disease outbreaks: in several local traditions a damaged, missing, or defaced Dōsojin was taken as an omen of epidemic or misfortune and prompted immediate ritual repair or renewed rites. Sometimes they are found as male, female figures or round stones. But they are also seen as a married couple of both male and female anthropomorphic figures. In urban areas today, dōsojin stone markers are usually placed on street cornes and near bridges for pedestrian protection.

== Important dōsojin ==
=== Batō Kannon ===
Batō Kannon is the bodhisattva of compassion and keeps a watchful eye over the animal state of Karmic Rebirth. Atop Batō Kannon's head rests a horse's head. Stone statues of this deity can be found beside perilous paths and byways, like Jizō statues, in northern Japan. However, Dosojin in Batō Kannon's form not only protect travelers, but their horses as well. The horse-head element is not meant to be “monstrous” for its own sake. In Buddhist art, powerful animal symbolism often points to specific functions: vigilance, speed, stamina, and the ability to carry beings across difficult terrain. Historically, horses were vital for transport, farming, warfare, and communication. They were also vulnerable, worked hard, injured, and lost. Bato Kannon became closely associated with the protection of horses and the people who depended on them: travelers, messengers, farmers, and communities whose livelihoods required safe passage and reliable labor.

=== Chimata no Kami ===
Chimata-no-kami (岐の神, god of crossroads), according to the Kojiki, was born when kami Izanagi threw away his trousers to wash himself after returning from Yomi, the land of the dead. The Nihongi and Kogo Shūi tell the same myth, but call the kami Sarutahiko. Chimata-no-kami symbols can be found at crossroads, perhaps because of the deity being associating with joining, and some famous onsens, to cure sexual or fertility issues.

=== Jizō ===
Jizō is the Japanese version of Bodhisattva Ksitigarbha, a Buddhist bodhisattva worshiped mainly in East Asia. His assimilation within a group of kami is an example of the Japanese syncretism of Buddhism and Shinto (shinbutsu shūgō). Originally from India, in Japan he was given new attributes and has become the guardian of children, expecting mothers, firemen, travelers, pilgrims, and unborn, aborted, or miscarried children. He is depicted as a plain monk, sometimes holding his shakujō (錫杖; six-ring staff) in one hand and the hōjunotama (宝珠の玉; wish-granting jewel) in the other. Statues of Jizō can be found along mountain passes or harrowing roads in Japan, often dressed in red, sometimes white, caps and bibs by distressed parents. Small stones are frequently piled in front of a Jizō statue, a tradition believed to relieve a child of their penance.

Jizō statues commonly appear in groupings of six, called Roku Jizō. Six because of Jizō's vow to exist concurrently at all six states of Karmic Rebirth. A Roku Jizō appears in the Japanese folktale Kasa Jizō.

=== Sae no Kami ===
In modern times, Dōsojin have become fused in popular belief with a different deity having similar characteristics called "Sae no kami", whose birth is described in the Kojiki. When one of the kami, Izanagi-no-mikoto, sought to leave after going to the realm of the dead (Yomi no Kuni) to visit his spouse Izanami-no-mikoto, he was chased by the demoness Yomotsushikome (黄泉醜女, lit. Yomi ugly woman). To stop her, he threw her a stick from which Sae no Kami was born. For this reason, he is the kami who prevents the passage of the spirits of the dead into the world of the living, and therefore a god who is a protector of boundaries. He is represented by large rocks set at the edges of villages. Because of the rocks' elongated shape, he came to be associated also with childbirth, children and matrimonial happiness. As a consequence, he was in turn associated also with Jizō, the bodhisattva who is the protector of children.

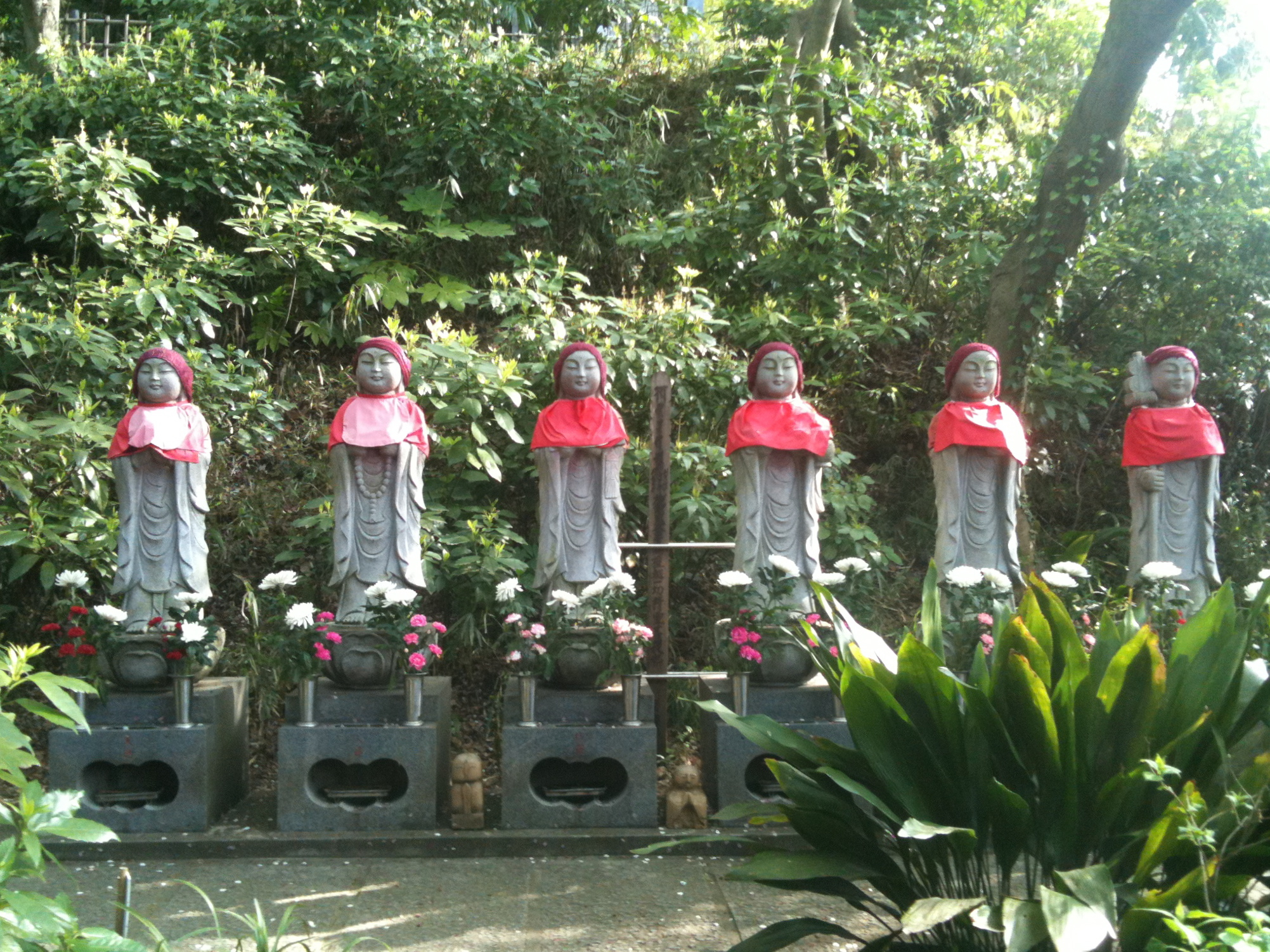
Roku Jizō

== Worship ==
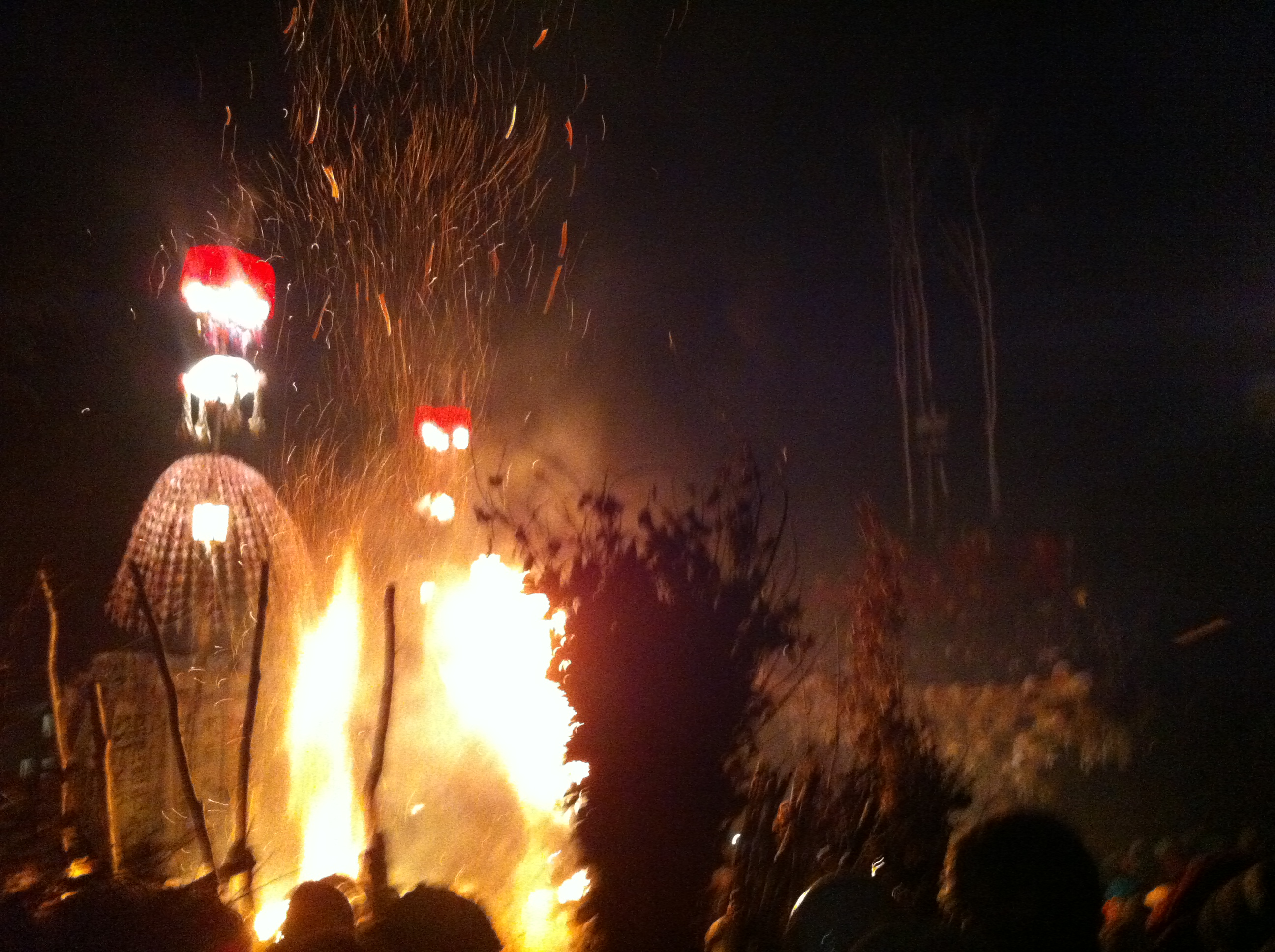
Hatsuakarikago lit up by flames from burning Shadan in Nozawa Onsen.

Every January 15 in the village of Nozawaonsen, Nagano the Dosojin Matsuri is held. The Dosojin Matsuri is a fire festival meant to celebrate the birth of a family's first child, exorcise yōkai, and ensure blissful marriages. The day prior to the Dosojin Matsuri, a hundred or so residents of Nozawaonsen construct a shaden. Meanwhile, across the glade are two wooden poles that represent a human couple, the village's version of Dōsojin. On the day of the festival the shaden is burned in a scuffle between men ages twenty-five and forty-two—considered unlucky ages for men in Japan—and the rest of the villagers who bear reed torches. As the shaden burns, the village men of forty-two years sing to the Dōsojin. The men ages twenty-five and forty-two play a key role in the festival to attain the protection of the Dōsojin, so that the misfortune brought about by their ages will be nullified. Some villagers in various villages are still continue to maintain these figures with different things on seasonal offerings such as flowers, sake and coins but mostly on local holidays. This longtime festival has lasted for more than 300 years. Although starting as an invocation for good fortune, health and abundance of the coming harvest, the festival became an intangible cultural property of Japan.

== In popular culture ==
- In chapter 34 of the supernatural manga Hyakki Yakoushou by Ichiko Ima, the male protagonist Ritsu and his cousin Tsukasa are compared to a Dōsojin.
- In the 2001 animated film Spirited Away by the Japanese animator and artist Hayao Miyazaki, the protagonist Chihiro Ogino and her parents as they stop in the forest, a Dōsojin statue appears at the entrance of building who leads to the spirit world.
- In the twentieth game of the bullet hell series Touhou Project, one of the bosses is an Egyptian-themed Dōsojin named Nareko Michigami (道神 馴子).
- In the 6th episode of the manga mono Haruno and the Cinephoto Club join a contest to find the roundest Maruishi Dōsojin around Yamanashi to win a holiday trip to Costa Rica.

== Gallery ==
Examples of Dōsojin (stone markers and shrines) from Wikimedia Commons. Click image for file page and license.

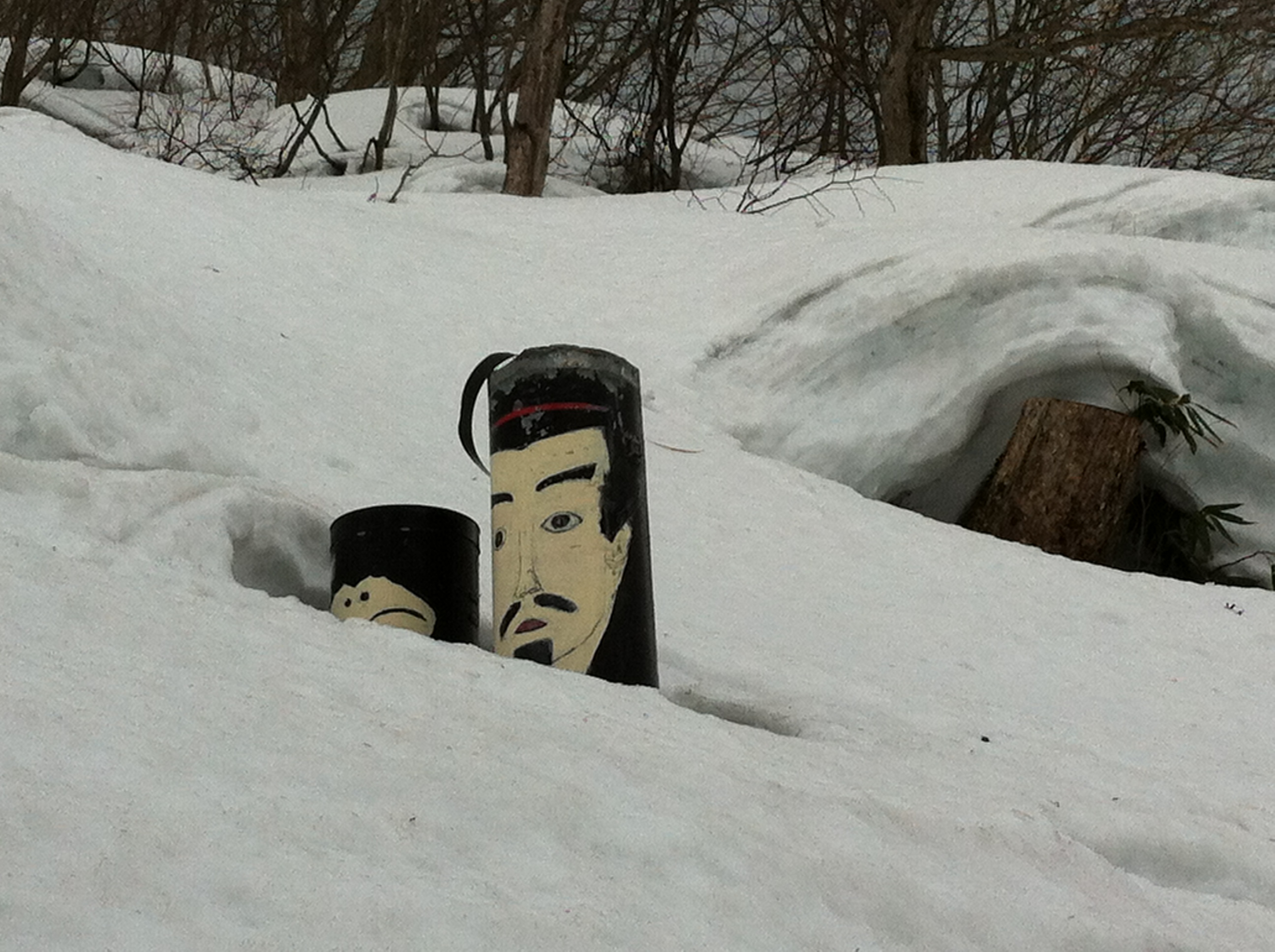
Dōsojin in the snow at Nozawa Onsen — roadside shrine used in local winter festivals (Nozawa Onsen).

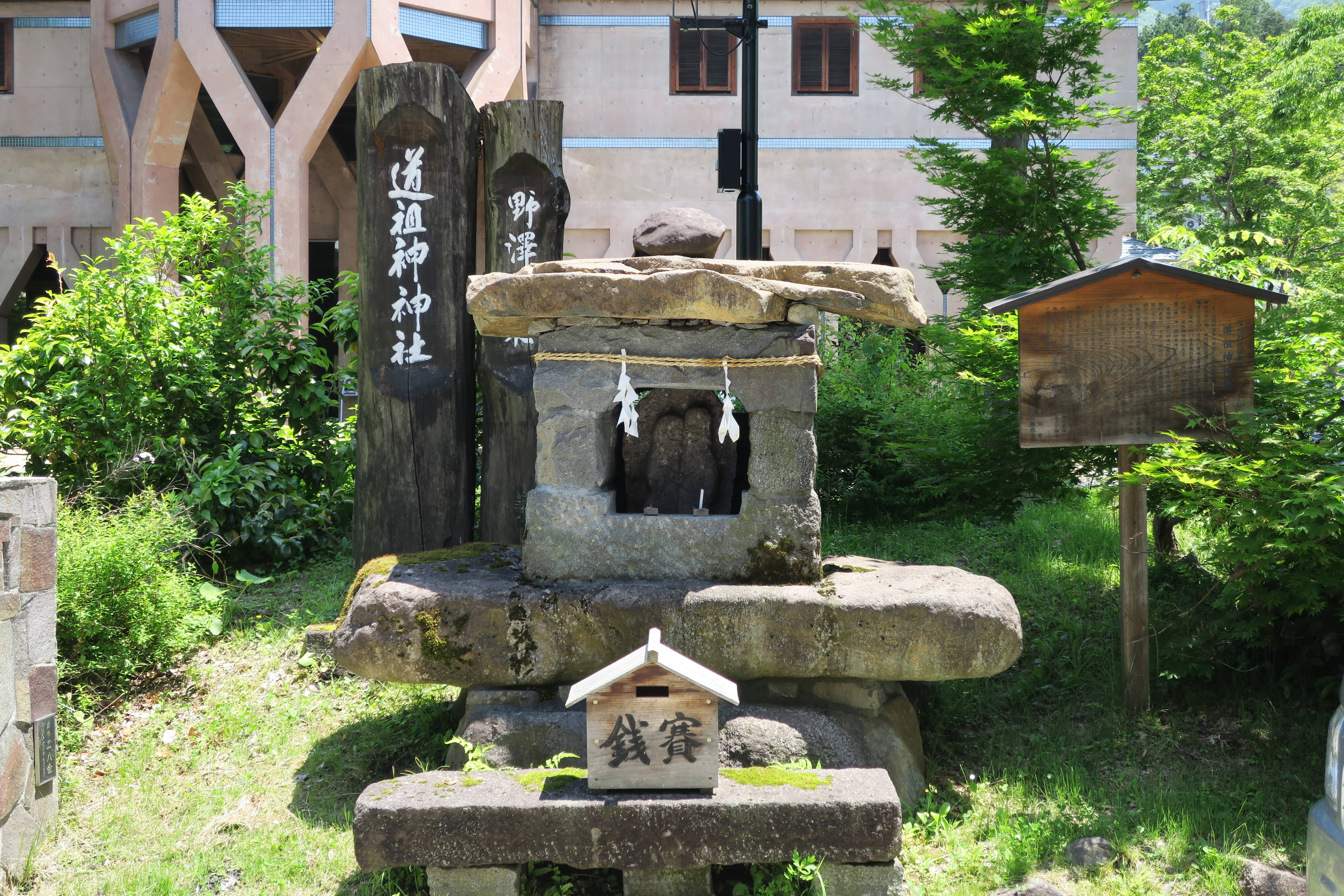
Nozawa Onsen Dōsojin-jinja — shrine complex and paired stones; site of community rituals.

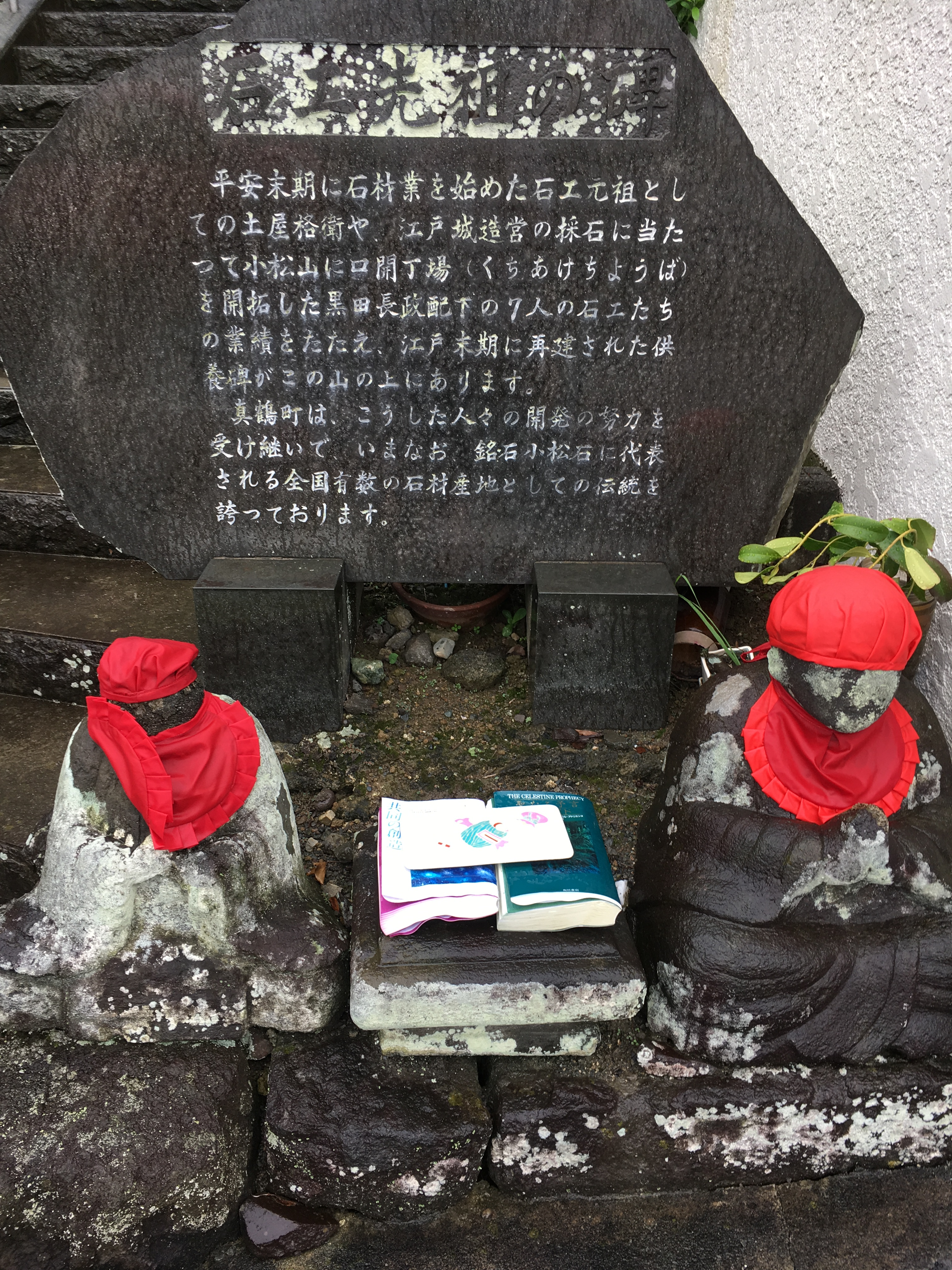
Carved stone Dōsojin — example of stylized folk carving typically found at village borders.

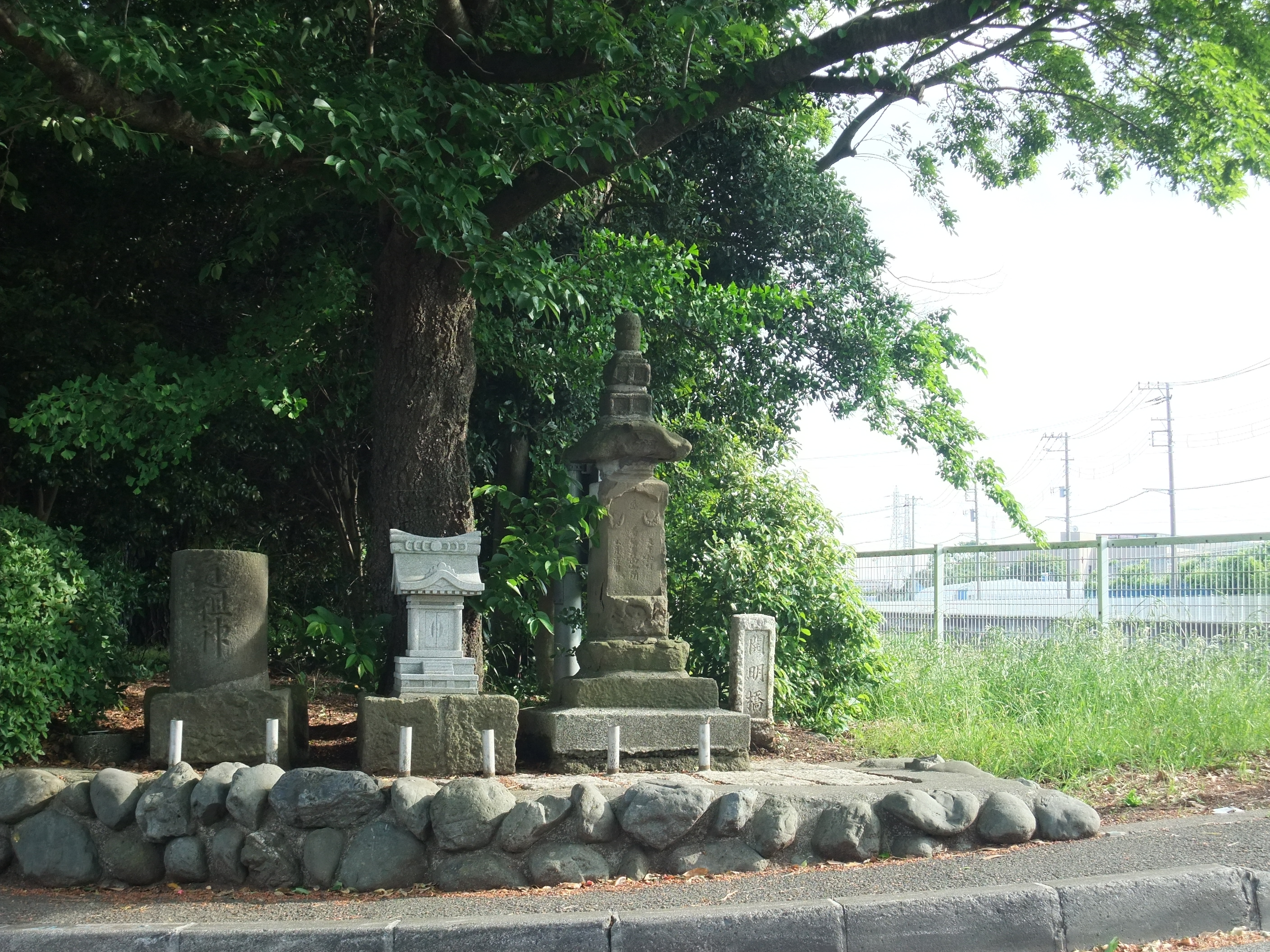
Dōsojin at Hachiken Shrine and nearby Kōshin monument — shows coexistence of multiple folk monuments.

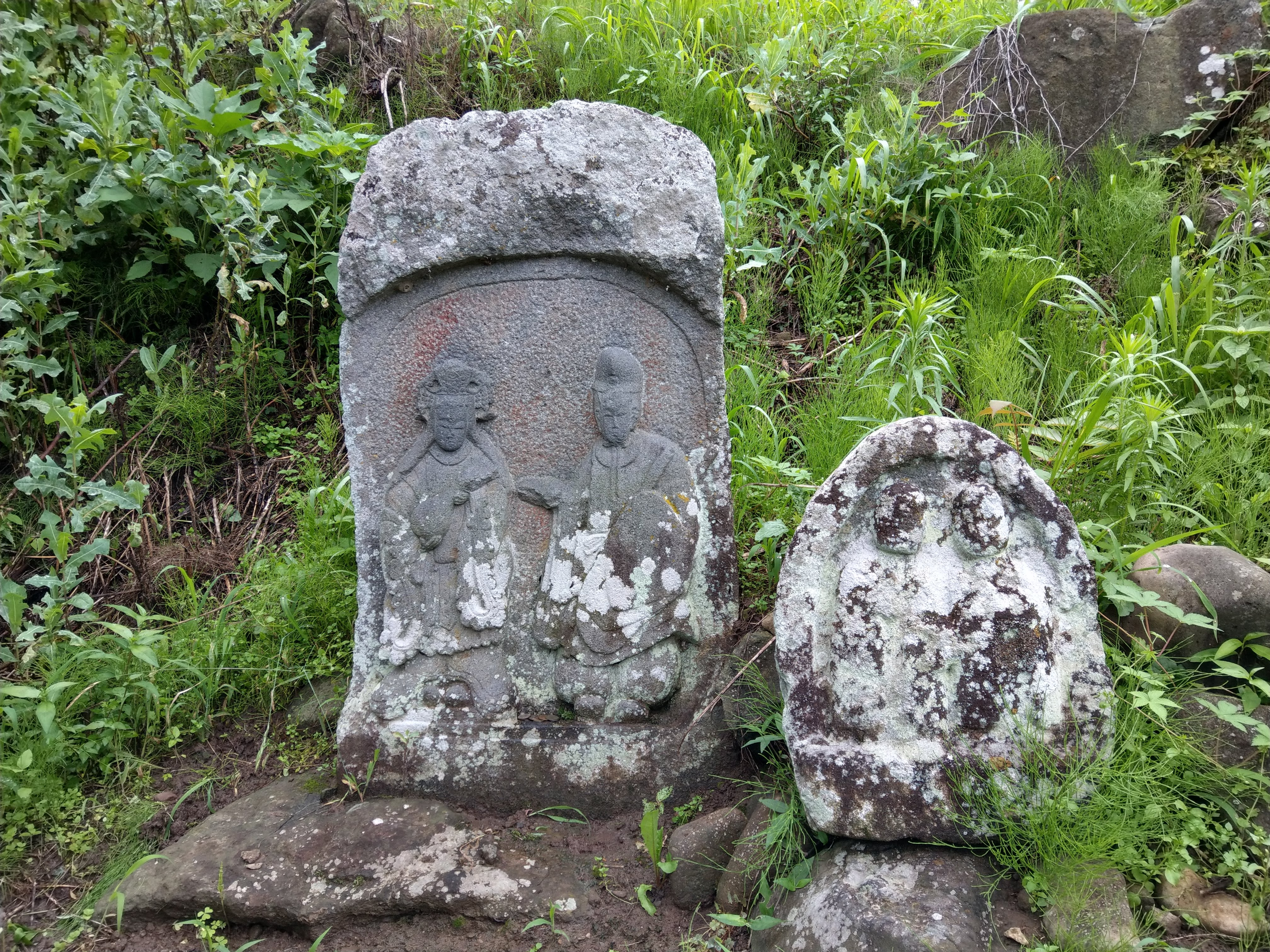
Shūgen (wedding-themed) Dōsojin carving — illustrates the association with marriage and fertility.

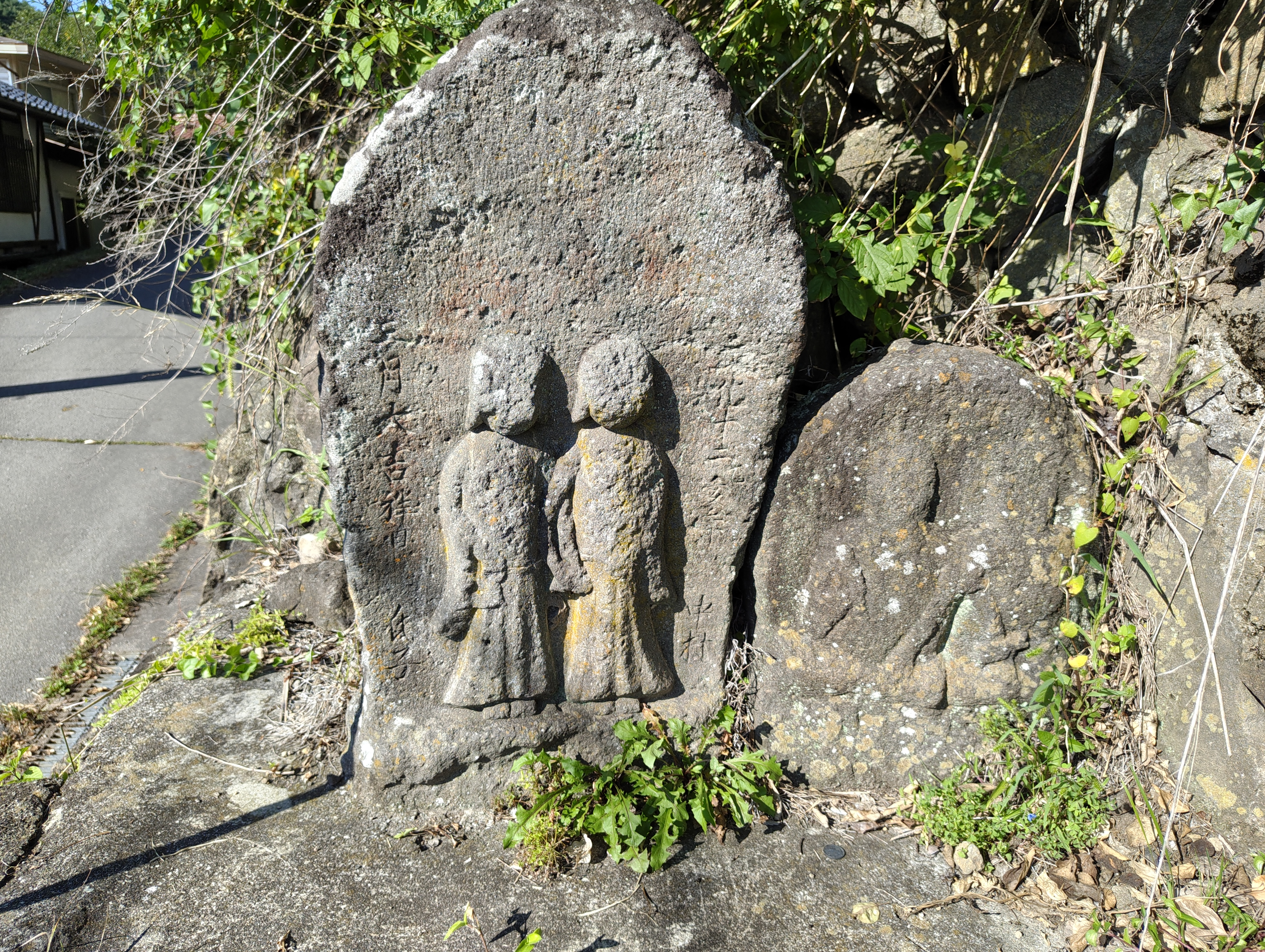
Village boundary Dōsojin (Nakamura, Hishino) — typical roadside placement marking community limits.

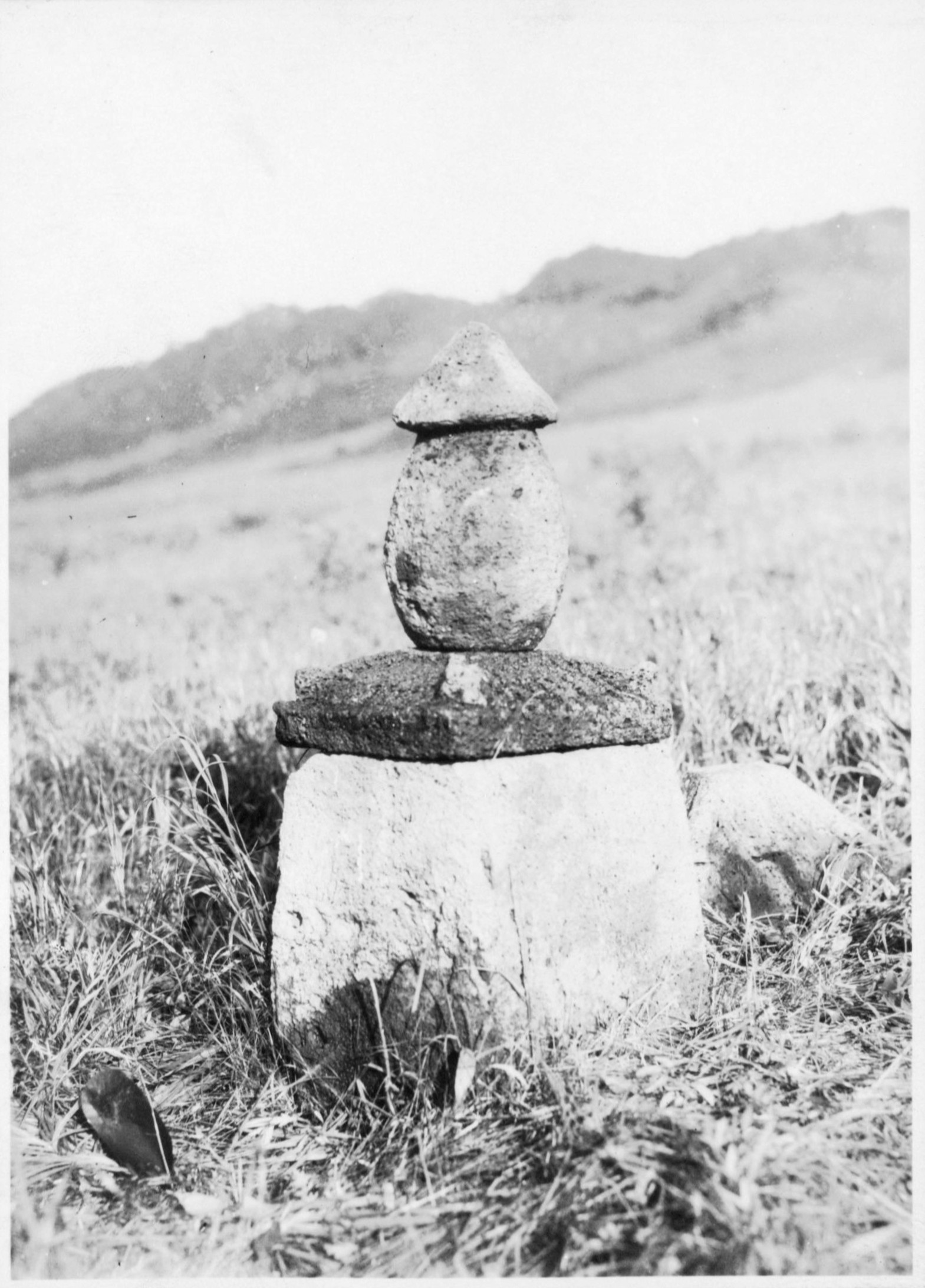
Historic photograph of a Dōsojin (captioned in original source) — example of earlier documentation and regional diversity.

== See also ==
- A-un
- Castor and Pollux – Greek mythical twins
- Gate deities of the underworld – Ancient Egyptian deities
- Glossary of Shinto
- Hecate – Greek goddess of magic and transitions
- Hermes/Mercury
  - Herm (sculpture)
- Janus – Roman god
- Kṣitigarbha – Bodhisattva
- Liminal deity – Gods of boundaries or transitions
- Lingam – Aniconic representation of the Hindu god Shiva
- Lugal-irra and Meslamta-ea – Pair of Mesopotamian gods
- Menshen – Chinese decoration placed on each side of an entry to a temple
- Nio – Guardians of the Buddha
- Ox-Head and Horse-Face – Underworld guardians in Asian mythology
- Pan – Ancient Greek god of the wilds, shepherds, and flocks
- Pushan – Hindu god
- Terminus – Roman god, protector of boundary markers
