= Takejirō =

- Gender: Male

Origin
- Origin: Japanese
- Meaning: Different meanings depending on the kanji used

Takejirō, Takejiro or Takejirou (written: 竹二郎 or 武次郎) is a masculine Japanese given name. Notable people with the name include:

- Hasegawa Takejirō (長谷川 武次郎) (1853–1938), Japanese publisher
- Tokonami Takejirō (床次 竹二郎) (1867–1935), Japanese politician
