= Japanese folktales =

Classic Japanese tales

Japanese folktales are traditional folk narratives of Japan, primarily transmitted orally. Among the best-known Japanese folktales are Momotarō, The Crab and the Monkey, Shita-kiri Suzume, Hanasaka Jiisan, and Kachi-kachi Yama, which are often collectively known as the "five great folktales" (五大昔話, Go-dai Mukashi banashi).

In its strict sense, the term refers to orally transmitted folk narratives. However, it is commonly used more broadly to include literary tales, particularly those written during the Middle Ages, that have long been associated with Japanese folklore. Notable examples are The Tale of the Bamboo Cutter and medieval such as the Konjaku Monogatarishū and Uji Shūi Monogatari, which preserve early literary versions of many stories that also survive in oral tradition.

The terminology used for Japanese folktales has changed over time. The systematic collection of Japanese folktales was pioneered by folklorist Kunio Yanagita. During the Edo period, they were commonly known as otogibanashi (お伽話). In the Meiji era, the loan translation minwa (民話) came into use. Yanagita preferred the term mukashibanashi (昔話; "tales of long ago") for orally transmitted folk narratives.

Related genres such as kaidan (ghost stories) overlap with Japanese folktales but are generally treated separately. Many Japanese folktales incorporate motifs derived from Chinese and Indian traditions, particularly Buddhist narratives such as the Jataka tales.

== Overview ==
A representative sampling of Japanese folklore would definitely include the quintessential Momotarō (Peach Boy), and perhaps other folktales listed among the so-called "five great fairy tales" (五大昔話, Go-dai Mukashi banashi): the battle between The Crab and the Monkey, Shita-kiri Suzume (Tongue-cut sparrow), Hanasaka Jiisan (Flower-blooming old man), and Kachi-kachi Yama.

=== History ===
These stories just named are considered genuine folktales, having been so characterized by folklorist Kunio Yanagita. During the Edo period these tales had been adapted by professional writers and woodblock-printed in a form a called kusazōshi (cf. chapbooks), but a number of local variant versions of the tales have been collected in the field as well.

As stated above, non-genuine folktales are those already committed to writing long ago, the earliest being the tale of Princess Kaguya (or The Tale of the Bamboo Cutter), an example of the monogatari type of romance dated to as early as the 10th century, though extant manuscripts are much later. The text mentions, for example, the flame-proof "fire rat (火鼠, Hinezumi) (or salamander)'s fur robe," which attests to a considerable degree of book-knowledge and learning by its author.

Other examples of pseudo-folktales composed in the Middle Ages are the Uji Shūi Monogatari (13th century) that includes Kobutori Jīsan — the old man with the hump on his cheek — and Straw Millionaire. This and the Konjaku Monogatarishū (12th century) contain a number of a type of tales called setsuwa, a generic term for narratives of various nature, anything from moralizing to comical. Both works are divided into parts containing tales from India, tales from China, and tales from Japan. In the Konjaku Monogatarishū can be seen the early developments of the Kintarō legend, familiar in folktale-type form.

The Japanese word used to correspond to "folktale" has undergone development over the years. From the Edo period, the term used was otokibanashi (お伽話), i.e., tales told by the otogii-shū, professional storytellers hired to entertain the daimyō lord at the bedside. That term remained in currency through the Meiji era (late 19th century), when imported terms such as minwa began to be used. In the Taishō era the word dōwa (lit. "children's story", a loan translation for fairy tales or märchen) was used. Later Yanagita popularized the use of mukashi-banashi "tales of long ago", as mentioned before.

Some Japanese ghost stories or kaidan, such as the story of the Yuki-onna ("snow woman"), might be considered examples of folktales, but even though some overlaps may exist, they are usually treated as another genre. The familiar forms of stories are embellished works of literature by gesaku writers, or retooled for the kabuki theater performance, in the case of the bakeneko or monstrous cat. The famous collection Kwaidan by Lafcadio Hearn also consists of original retellings. Yanagita published a collection, 'Legends of Tōno (遠野物語, Tōno Monogatari)' (1910), which featured a number of fantastical yōkai creatures such as Zashiki-warashi and kappa.

In the middle years of the 20th century storytellers would often travel from town to town telling these stories with special paper illustrations called kamishibai.

== List of Japanese folktales ==
Below is a list of well-known Japanese folktales:

No.	Name	Portrait	Note
hero/heroine type
1	Chikarataro		
2	Issun-bōshi		the One-inch Boy
3	Kintarō		the superhuman Golden Boy, based on folk hero Sakata no Kintoki
4	Momotarō		the oni-slaying Peach Boy
5	The Tale of the Bamboo Cutter		about a mysterious girl called Kaguya-hime who is said to be from the capital of the moon
6	Shippeitaro		a warrior and a dog who defeated evil spirits
7	Uriko-hime		a girl born out of a melon and adopted by an elderly human couple
8	Hachikazuki		a girl that wears a bowl on her head
9	Hagoromo		a tennin has her feather mantle stolen by a fisherman
grateful creature motif
10	Bunbuku Chagama		the story of a teakettle which is actually a shape-changing tanuki
11	Hanasaka Jiisan		the story of the old man that made the flowers bloom
12	Kasa Jizō		a Jizō statue given a straw hat and is grateful
13	Omusubi Kororin		the story of an old man who drops rice into a mouse hole
14	Shita-kiri Suzume		the story of the tongue-cut sparrow
15	Urashima Tarō		who rescued a turtle and visited the bottom of the sea
16	My Lord Bag of Rice		
17	Tsuru no Ongaeshi		the story of a crane returning a favor for saving its life
good fortune motif
18	Kobutori Jīsan		a man with a large wen (tumor, kobu) on his cheek, and how he loses it
19	Straw Millionaire		Straw Millionaire (わらしべ長者, Warashibe Chōja)
punishment motif
20	The Crab and the Monkey		Monkey-Crab Battle (さるかに合戦, saru kani gassen)
21	Kachi-kachi Yama		rabbit punishes tanuki

=== Animals in folklore ===
Tongue-cut sparrow: A washer woman cut off the tongue of a sparrow that was pecking at her rice starch. The sparrow had been fed regularly by the washer woman's neighbors, so when the sparrow didn't come, they went in the woods to search for it. They found it, and after a feast and some dancing (which the sparrow prepared), the neighbors were given the choice between two boxes; one large and one small. The neighbors picked the small box, and it was filled with riches. The washer woman saw these riches and heard where they came from, so she went to the sparrow. She too was entertained and given the choice between two boxes. The washer woman picked the largest box and instead of gaining riches, she was devoured by devils.

Mandarin Ducks: A man kills a drake mandarin duck for food. That night he had a dream that a woman was accusing him of murdering her husband, and then told him to return to the lake. The man does this, and a female mandarin walks up to him and tears its chest open.

Tanuki and Rabbit: A man catches a tanuki and tells his wife to cook it in a stew. The tanuki begs the wife not to cook him and promises to help with the cooking if he is spared. The wife agrees and unties him. The tanuki then transforms into her and kills her, then cooks her in a stew. Disguised as the man's wife, the tanuki feeds him his wife. Once he is done, the tanuki transforms back to his original form and teases the man for eating his wife. A rabbit that was friends with the family was furious, so he had the tanuki carry sticks and, while he wasn't looking, set these sticks on fire. Then the rabbit treated the burn with hot pepper paste. Finally, the rabbit convinced the tanuki to build a boat of clay, and the rabbit followed in a sturdy boat. The clay boat began to sink, so the tanuki tried to escape, but then the rabbit hit him in the head with an oar, knocking him out and making him drown.

Badger and Fox cub: A badger, vixen, and the vixen's cub lived in a forest that was running out of food, so they came up with the plan of one of them pretending to be dead, the other disguising as a merchant, and the “merchant” selling the “dead” animal to a human. Then they would have money to buy food. The vixen pretended to be dead while the badger was the merchant. While the transaction was happening however, the badger told the human that the vixen wasn't actually dead, so the human killed her. This infuriated the cub, so he proposed a competition. They would both disguise as humans and go into the village at different times. Whoever guessed what “human” was the other first, wins. The cub walked towards the village first, but he hid behind a tree. The badger went into the village, and accused the governor of being the fox, so the bodyguards of the governor beheaded him.

== Theorized influences ==
The folklore of Japan has been influenced by foreign literature as well as the kind of spirit worship prevalent all throughout prehistoric Asia.

The monkey stories of Japanese folklore have been influenced both by the Sanskrit epic Ramayana and the Chinese classic Journey to the West. The stories mentioned in the Buddhist Jataka tales appear in a modified form throughout the Japanese collection of popular stories.

Some stories of ancient India were influential in shaping Japanese stories by providing them with materials. Indian materials were greatly modified and adapted in such a way as would appeal to the sensibilities of common people of Japan in general, transmitted through China and Korea.

== See also ==
- Gesaku
  - Tale of the Gallant Jiraiya (Jiraiya Goketsu Monogatari)
- Kaidan
  - Banchō Sarayashiki, the ghost story of Okiku and the Nine Plates.
  - Yotsuya Kaidan, the ghost story of Oiwa.
  - Yukionna, the snow woman.
- Legends
  - Hagoromo legend, related to Hagoromo (play)
  - Kiyohime legend; passionate for a priest, she turned into a dragon.
  - Tamamo-no-Mae, a vixen-type yōkai monster, masquerading as a woman.
  - Ushiwakamaru, about Yoshitsune's youth and training with the tengu of Kurama.
- Mythology
  - Luck of the Sea and Luck of the Mountains
- Setsuwa
- Urban Legends
- Hōmyō dōji

== Further sources ==
- Algarin, Joanne P. (1982). Japanese folk literature: a core collection and reference guide. New York: R.R. Bowker.

Individual collections

- Brauns, David. Japanische Märchen und Sagen. Leipzig: Verlag von Wilhelm Friedrich. 1885.
- Dorson, Richard M. "National Characteristics of Japanese Folktales". In: Folklore, Nationalism and Politics. Edited by Felix J. Oinas. Indiana University Folklore Institute Monograph Series, Vol. 30. Columbus, Ohio: Slavica Publishers, 1978. pp. 147–162.
- Dorson, Richard M. Journal of the American Oriental Society 95, no. 3 (1975): 512–14. Accessed July 1, 2020. doi:10.2307/599376.
- Gordon Smith, Richard (1908). Ancient Tales and Folklore of Japan. London: A. & C. Black. ISBN 9781606200919.
- Heibonsha (1969) [1968]. 世界百科事典(Sekai hyakka jiten). Vol. 15. pp. 804–6., Article under densetsu (伝説), by Keigo Seki (ja:関敬吾)
- James, Grace; Goble, Warwick, III. Green Willow and other Japanese fairy tales. London: Macmillan and Co. 1910.
- Mayer, Fanny Hagin. "Recent Collections of Japanese Folk Tales". In: The Journal of Asian Studies 31, no. 4 (1972): 911–914. Accessed July 1, 2020. doi:10.2307/2052110.
- Mayer, Fanny Hagin. "Religious Concepts in the Japanese Folk Tale". In: Japanese Journal of Religious Studies 1, no. 1 (1974): 73–101. Accessed July 1, 2020. JSTOR 30234416.
- Mayer, Fanny Hagin. "Japan's Folk Tale Boom". In: Journal of Japanese Studies 4, no. 1 (1978): 215–24. Accessed July 25, 2021. doi:10.2307/132081.
- Mulhern, Chieko Irie and Mayer, Fanny Hagin. “Ancient Tales in Modern Japan: An Anthology of Japanese Folk Tales” (1986).
- Nakawaki Hatsue. "Japanese Heroine Tales and the Significance of Storytelling in Contemporary Society". In: Re-Orienting the Fairy Tale: Contemporary Adaptations across Cultures. Edited by Mayako Murai and Luciana Cardi. Detroit: Wayne State University Press. 2020. pp. 139–168. ISBN 978-0-8143-4537-5.
- Rasch, Carsten: TALES OF OLD JAPAN FAIRY TALE - FOLKLORE - GHOST STORIES - MYTHOLOGY: INTRODUCTION IN THE JAPANESE LITERATURE OF THE GENRE OF FAIRY TALES - FOLKLORE - GHOST STORIES AND MYTHOLOGY, Hamburg. 2015.
- Seki, Keigo. "Types of Japanese Folktales". In: Asian Folklore Studies 25 (1966): 1–220. doi:10.2307/1177478.
