= The Boy Who Drew Cats =

Japanese fairy tale

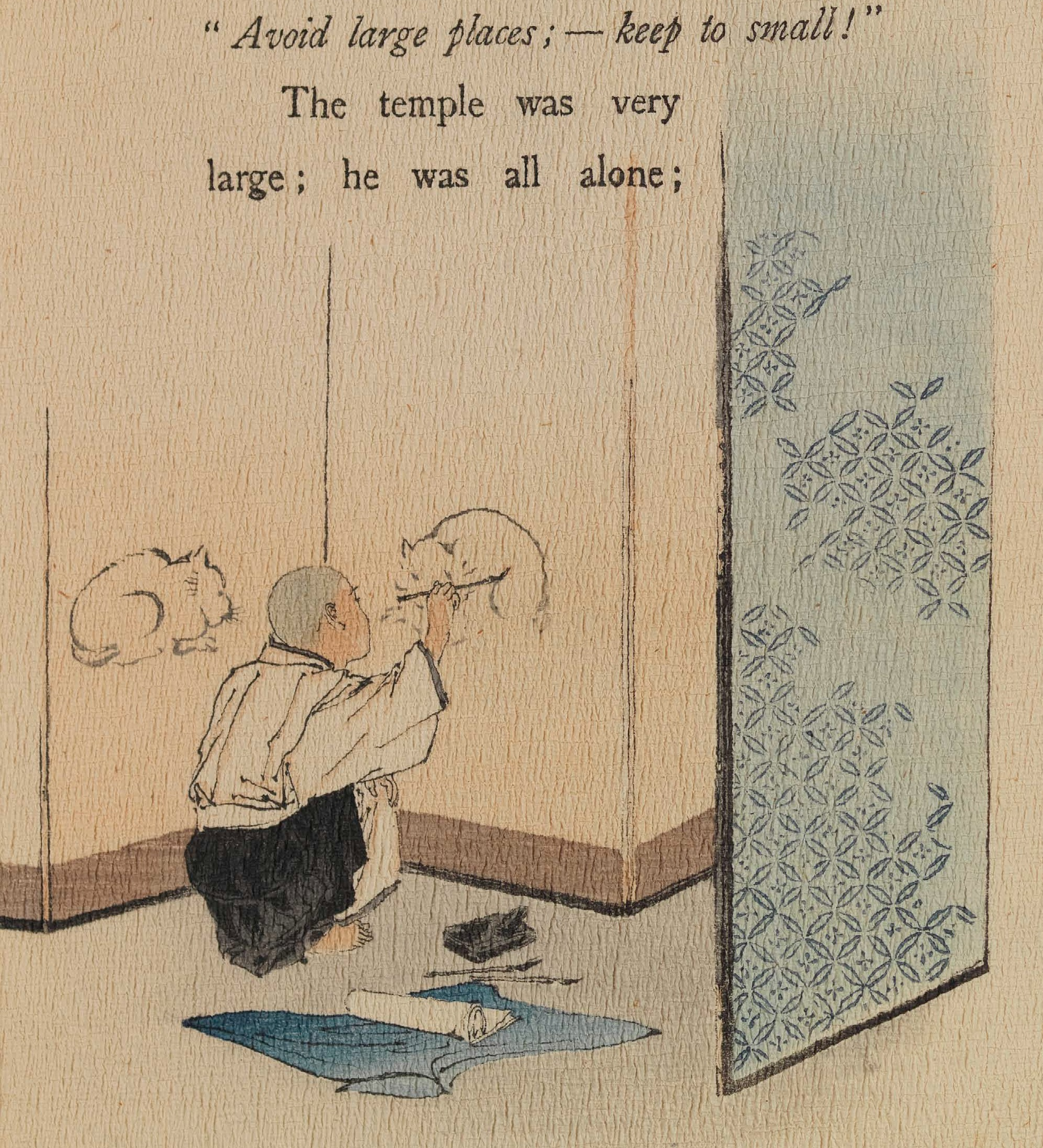
The boy draws cats on a byōbu screen at the haunted temple. —Hearn tr., (1898). Illustrated by Kason.

"The Boy Who Drew Cats" (Japanese: 猫を描いた少年, Hepburn: Neko wo egaita shōnen) is a Japanese fairy tale translated by Lafcadio Hearn, published in 1898, as number 23 of Hasegawa Takejirō's Japanese Fairy Tale Series. It was later included in Hearn's Japanese Fairy Tales.

The original title in Hearn's manuscript was "The Artist of Cats". Printing it on plain paper as in the rest of the series did not meet with Hearn's approval, and this book became the first of a five-volume set by Hearn printed on crepe paper. Illustrations were by the artist Suzuki Kason. (Note: The illustration of the byōbu screen (or rather, a tsuitate screen, on p. 4) is signed "Kason", allowing this artist to be identified.)

== Origin ==
This tale was known from Tohoku to Chugoku and Shikoku regions under the title Eneko to Nezumi (絵猫と鼠, "The Picture-Cats and the Rat"). Some commentators trace the tale to the 15th century legends around Sesshū.

It has been suggested that Lafcadio Hearn's version is a retelling, and has no original Japanese story which is an "exact counterpart". Thus "in his English edition, Lafcadio Hearn retold it with a thrilling ghostly touch. In the original story, the acolyte becomes the abbot of the temple after the incident, but in Hearn's version, he goes on to be a renowned artist". (Note: Quote from the Kyoto University of Foreign Studies pamphlet for the 2007 "Crepe-paper Book" exhibit.)

== Analyses ==
The legends surrounding the eminent inkbrush artist priest Sesshū as a young acolyte has been compared to this folktale, and it has been suggested the tale may derive from the legends around young Sesshū.

Hearn stipulated that he would not contribute a story unless it would be "prettily illustrated" in publication, and even though the choice of artist was not the author/translator's, Kason's drawing catered to the American readers' taste for the fantastical, as in the example of the illustration showing the dead giant rat-ghoul.

The tale is included as the second of 51 tales in the 1960 book, All Cats go to Heaven.
