= Hōmyō dōji =

Japanese fable

Hōmyō dōji (ほうみょう童子) is a Japanese folktale, a variant on an East Indian Buddhist legend. The story tells of a man whose child is chosen to become a sacrifice to a giant snake. A boy named Hōmyō, whose father has recently died, offers himself as a surrogate for the sacrifice. As he is preparing for death by reciting a Buddhist sutra, a Boddhisatva appears and saves him. Hōmyō is brought before the king, a staunch anti-Buddhist, who is converted by the story and abdicates his throne.

The Hōmyō dōji story was published as a three-volume e-hon at some point in the 18th century.
