= The Crab and the Monkey =

Japanese folktale

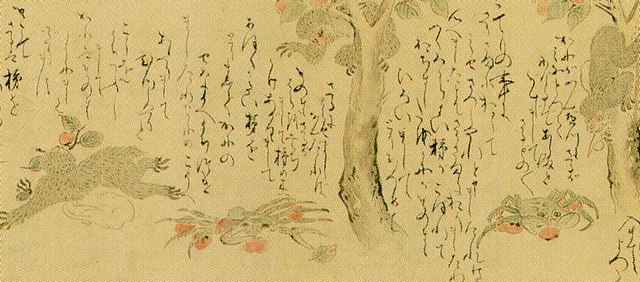
Saru Kani Gassen Emaki, a rare emakimono of this folktale in the Edo period

The Crab and the Monkey, also known as Monkey-Crab Battle (猿かに合戦, saru kani gassen) or The Quarrel of the Monkey and the Crab, is a Japanese folktale. In the story, a sly monkey kills a crab, and is later killed in revenge by the crab's offspring. Retributive justice is the main theme of the story.

Rev. David Thomson's translation, The Battle of the Monkey and the Crab, was published as the third volume of Hasegawa Takejirō's Japanese Fairy Tale Series in 1885. Andrew Lang included a somewhat bowdlerized version in The Crimson Fairy Book (1903) and Yei Theodora Ozaki included it in her Japanese Fairy Tales (1908).

== Synopsis ==
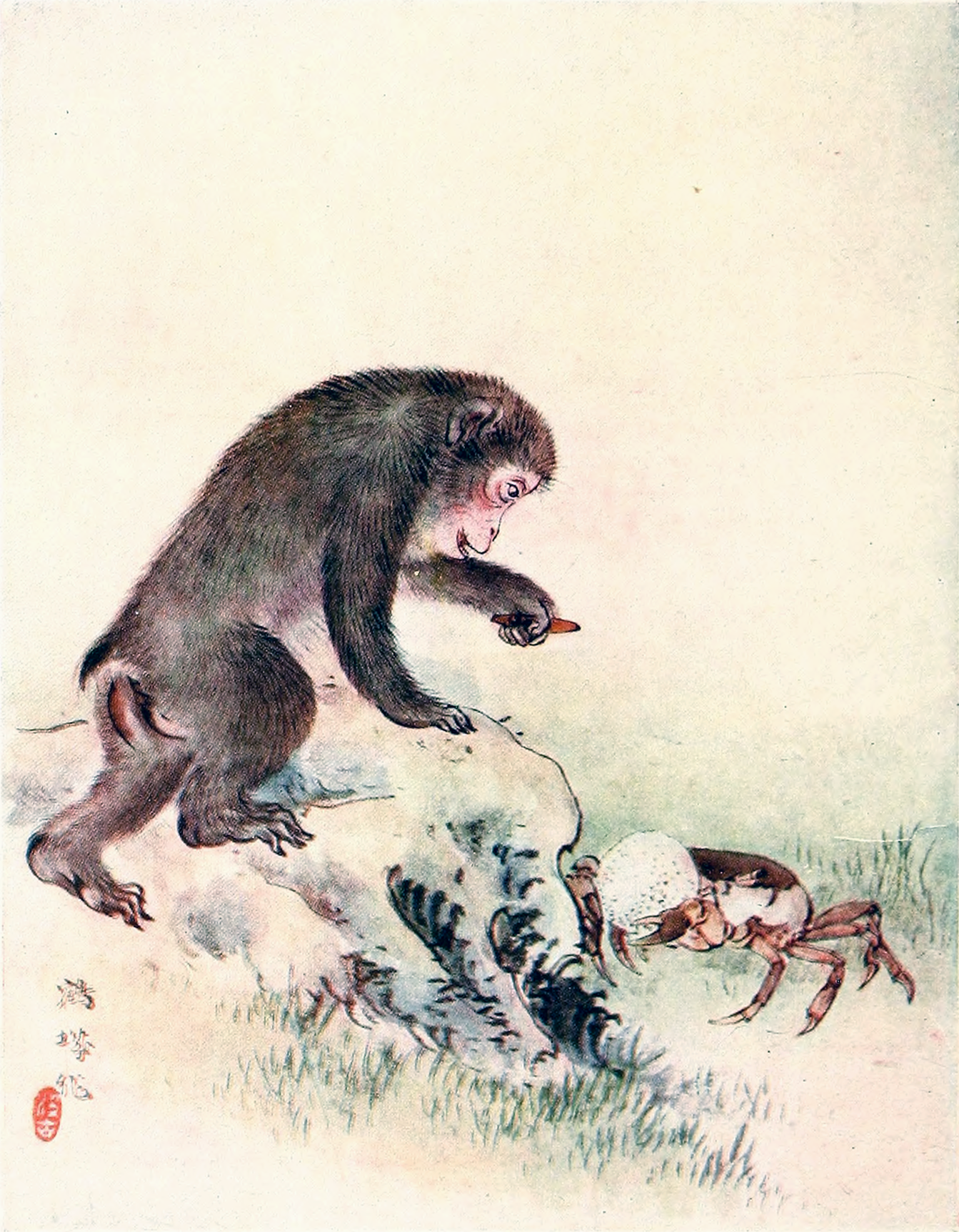
The monkey proposes the exchange of the persimmon seed for the crab's rice ball.

While out walking, a crab finds a rice ball. A sly monkey persuades the crab to trade the rice ball for a persimmon seed. The crab is at first upset, but when she plants and tends the seed a tree grows that supplies abundant fruit. The monkey agrees to climb the tree to pick the fruit for the crab, but gorges himself on the fruit rather than sharing it with the crab. When the crab protests, the monkey hurls hard, unripe fruit at her. The shock of being attacked causes the crab to end up giving birth just before she dies.

The crab's offspring seek revenge on the monkey. With the help of several allies — a chestnut, a cow dung, a bee, and an usu (large heavy mortar) — they go to the monkey's house. The chestnut hides himself on the monkey's hearth, the bee in the water pail, the cow dung on the floor, and the usu on the roof. When the monkey returns home, he tries to warm himself on the hearth, but the chestnut strikes the monkey so that he burns himself. When the monkey tries to cool himself from the burn at the water bucket, the bee stings him. He tries to run out of the house, but the cow dung makes him slip and the usu falls down from the roof, killing the monkey by crushing his heart, causing him to bleed out and die.

== Variants ==
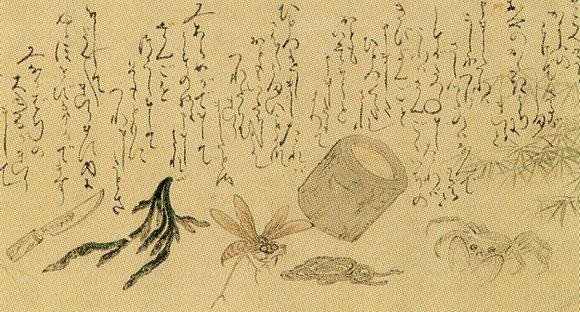
The crab's children seek revenge with the help of an usu, a snake, a bee, arame (kelp), and a kitchen knife.

The name of the story, the list of allies, and the details of the attacks vary in different parts of Japan. For example, in Kansai one of the allies is a quantity of oil. In a version of the story published in a Japanese textbook in 1887, an egg appears in place of the chestnut and a piece of kelp replaces the cow dung. The egg attacks the monkey by exploding and the kelp slips from under his foot.

In the version of the story published by Andrew Lang, the crab gathers the unripe fruit and is not killed, but the monkey leaves her for dead.

Modern versions of the story often tone down the violence such as changing characters' deaths to injuries. The title "The Crab and the Monkey" or "The Story of the Monkey and the Crab" similarly reduce the violence apparent in the older "Monkey-Crab Battle" name.

Twentieth-century Japanese novelist Ryunosuke Akutagawa wrote a short story based on the folktale in which, after avenging their mother's death by attacking the monkey, the crab children are arrested and face the death penalty.

In a completely different version of the story, when the monkey climbs the tree and takes all the persimmons the crab advises him to hang his basket of fruit from a branch. When the monkey hangs his basket on a thin branch, the branch breaks and the basket of fruit falls. The crab quickly carries the fruit off and crawls down a hole. The monkey decides to defecate on the crab, and sticks his buttocks down the hole. The crab quickly shaves the monkey's bottom, which is why to this day monkeys have hairless bottoms and hair grows on crabs' claws.

Similar stories involving a crab and a monkey, or a monkey and a toad, or other creatures seeking vengeance are found in China, Korea, and Mongolia, and among the Ainu.
