= Hasegawa Takejirō =

Japanese publisher

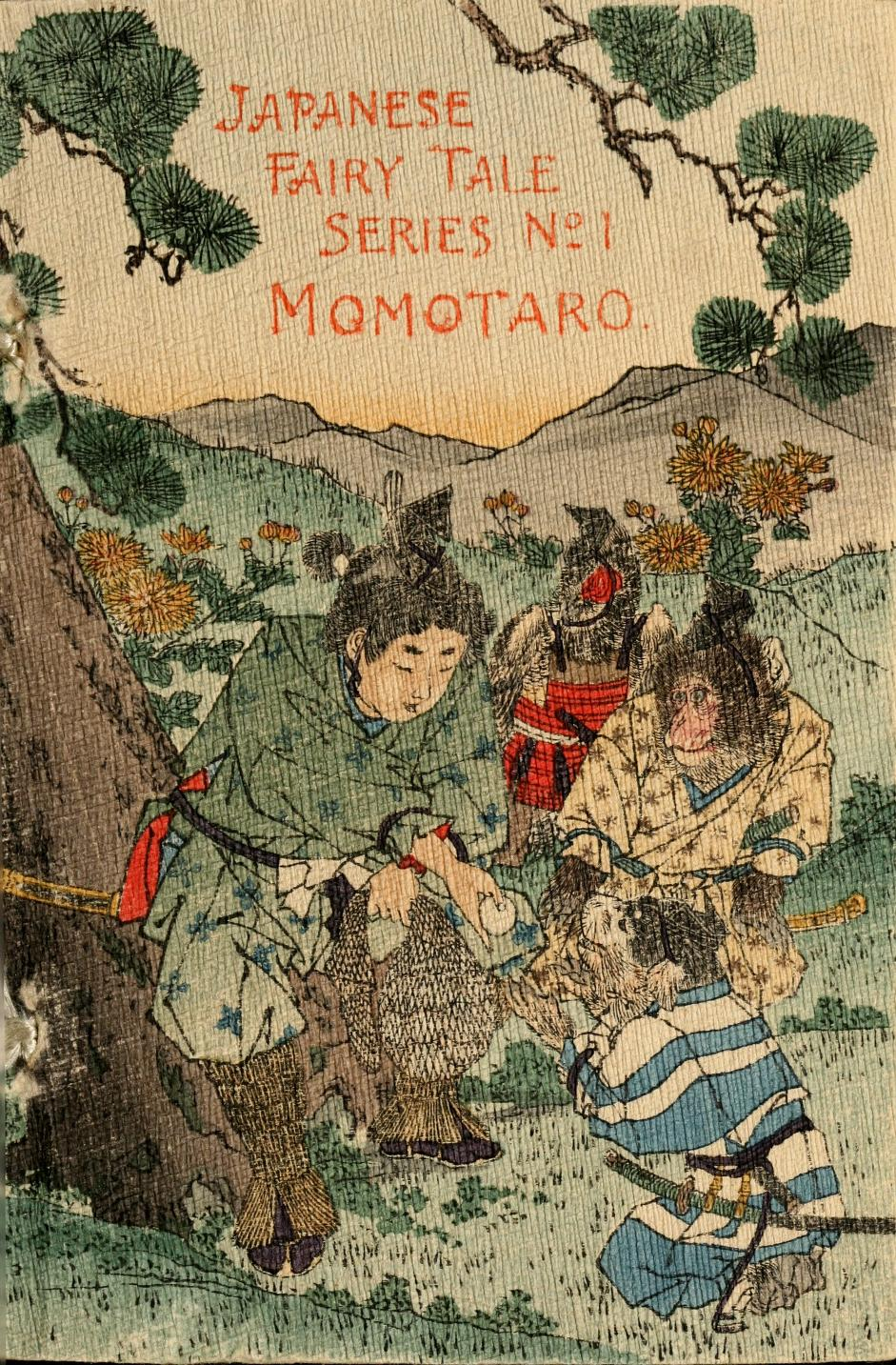
Cover of Momotaro (second edition, 1886)

Hasegawa Takejirō (長谷川武次郎; 1853–1938) was an innovative Japanese publisher specializing in books in European languages on Japanese subjects. He employed leading foreign residents as translators and noted Japanese artists as illustrators, and became a leading purveyor of export books and publications for foreign residents in Japan.

== Beginnings ==
Hasegawa's earliest known books were published under the "Kobunsha" imprint in the mid-1880s but around 1889 he began publishing under the names "T. Hasegawa" and "Hasegawa & Co." Early publications included a monochrome woodcut illustrated Hokusai collection and a two volume Writings of Buddha (Kobunsha, 1884).

Many of Hasegawa's early books were in the form of chirimen-bon (ちりめん本) or crêpe paper books.

== Japanese Fairy Tale Series ==
In 1885, Hasegawa published the first six volumes of his Japanese Fairy Tale Series, employing American Presbyterian missionary Rev. David Thomson as translator. As the series proved profitable, Hasegawa added other translators beginning with James Curtis Hepburn for the seventh volume, including Basil Hall Chamberlain, Lafcadio Hearn, and Chamberlain's friend Kate James, wife of his Imperial Japanese Naval Academy colleague, Thomas H. James. The books were illustrated by Kobayashi Eitaku until his death in 1890, and by various other artists afterwards.

By 1903, the series reached 28 volumes in two series. Most of the stories were based on well-known Japanese folk tales, but some of the later books, including several by Lafcadio Hearn, are thought to have been invented rather than translated, or perhaps combine elements of several folk tales. The books continued to be reprinted, sometimes with variant titles, for several decades.

Number	Title(s)	Japanese name	Translator	Publication
1	Little Peachling Momotaro	Momotaro	David Thomson	1885
2	Tongue-Cut Sparrow Tongue Cut Sparrow	Shita-kiri suzume	David Thomson	1885
3	Battle of the Monkey and the Crab Battle of the Monkey & Crab	Saru kani gassen	David Thomson	1885
4	The Old Man Who Made the Dead Trees Blossom Hanasaki Jiji	Hanasaki jiji	David Thomson	1885
5	Kachi-Kachi Mountain Kachi-Kachi Yama	Kachi-kachi Yama	David Thomson	1885
6	The Mouse's Wedding Nedzumi no Yome-Iri	Nezumi no Yomeiri	David Thomson	1885
7	The Old Man and the Devils The Old Man & the Devils	Kobutori	James Curtis Hepburn	1886
8	Urashima, The Fisher-Boy Urashima, The Fisher-Boy Urashima	Urashima Taro	Basil Hall Chamberlain	1886
9	The Serpent With Eight Heads Yamata No Orochi	Yamata no orochi	Basil Hall Chamberlain	1886
10	The Matsuyama Mirror Matsuyama Kagami	Matsuyama kagami	Mrs. T.H. (Kate) James	1886
11	The Hare of Inaba	Inaba no shirousagi	Mrs. T.H. (Kate) James	1886
12	The Cub's Triumph Kitsune no Tegara	Kitsune no tegara	Mrs. T.H. (Kate) James	1886
13	The Silly Jelly-Fish	Kurage honenashi	Basil Hall Chamberlain	1887
14	The Princes Fire-Flash and Fire-Fade	Tamanoi	Mrs. T.H. (Kate) James	1887
15	My Lord Bag-O'Rice	Tawara no Toda	Basil Hall Chamberlain	1887
16	The Wooden Bowl	Hachi kazuki	Mrs. T.H. (Kate) James	1887
16*	Wonderful Tea Kettle	Bunbuku chagama	Mrs. T.H. (Kate) James	1896
17	Schippeitaro	Shippeitaro	Mrs. T.H. (Kate) James	1888
18	The Ogre's Arm	Rashomon	Mrs. T.H. (Kate) James	1889
19	The Ogres of Oyeyama	Oeyama	Mrs. T.H. (Kate) James	?
20	The Enchanted Waterfall	Ko wa shimizu	Mrs. T.H. (Kate) James	?
21	Three Reflections	Ama saiban	Mrs. T.H. (Kate) James	1894
22	The Flowers of Remembrance and Forgetfulness		Mrs. T.H. (Kate) James	1894
23	The Boy Who Drew Cats	Eneko to nezumi	Lafcadio Hearn	1898
24	The Old Woman Who Lost Her Dumpling		Lafcadio Hearn	1902
25	Chin Chin Kobakama	Chiichii kobakama	Lafcadio Hearn	1903
2-1	The Goblin Spider		Lafcadio Hearn	1902?
2-2	The Wonderful Mallet		Mrs. T.H. (Kate) James	1899
2-3	The Broken Images		Mrs. T.H. (Kate) James	1903
-	Princess Splendor: The Woodcutter's Daughter Princess Splendor, Japanese Fairy Tale	Taketori monogatari	Edward Rothesay Miller	1889
-	The Fountain of Youth		Lafcadio Hearn	1922

The two series of fairy tale books were also packaged into various types of sets. In 1922 an additional Lafcadio Hearn title, The Fountain of Youth was added, and a five volume Hearn set was sold. Princess Splendor: The Woodcutter's Daughter, a translation of Taketori monogatari by American missionary Edward Rothesay Miller, was presumably excluded from the series because of its greater length. A three volume series of Aino Fairy Tales translated by Basil Hall Chamberlain, consisting of The Hunter in Fairy-Land, The Birds' Party, and The Man Who Lost His Wife, was also issued in 1887.

Many of the fairy tale books appeared in other European language translations, including French, German, Spanish, Portuguese, and Swedish.

== Other publications ==
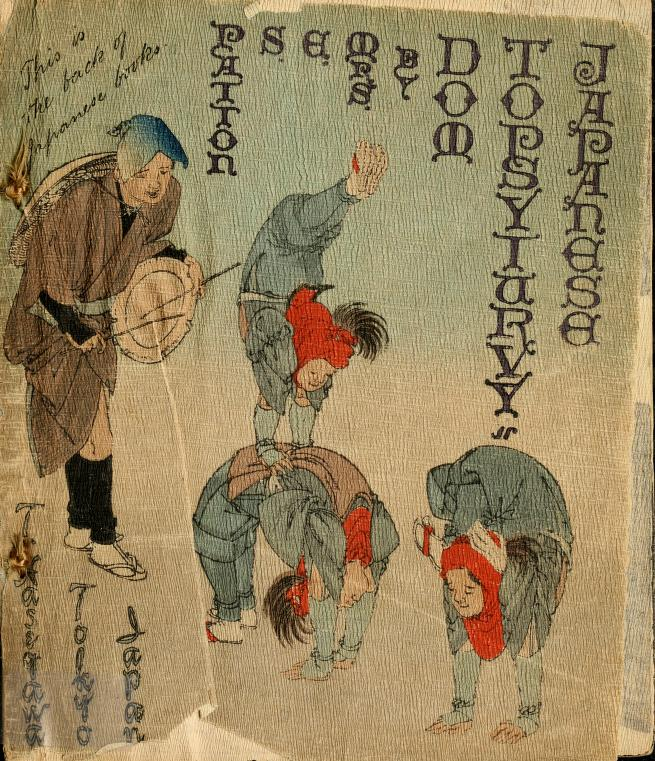
Japanese Topsyturvydom by Mrs. E.S. Patton (1896)

Besides the popular fairy tale books, Hasegawa produced other books for Japan's tourist trade and foreign community. Many, like his illustrated calendars with humorous verses, were of an ephemeral nature. There were also translations of Japanese poetry, including the three volume series, Sword and Blossom: Poems from Japan translated by Charlotte Peake and Kimura Shotaro (1907-1910), collections of prints by famous artists such as Hiroshige and Hokusai, and illustrated books on Japanese life and customs, such as Japanese Pictures of Japanese Life (1895), Japanese Topsyturvydom by Mrs. E.S. Patton (1896), and The Favorite Flowers of Japan, with text by Mary E. Unger and illustrations by Mishima Shoso (1901).
