= The Fountain of Youth (fairy tale) =

Japanese fairy tale

The Fountain of Youth is a Japanese fairy tale collected by Lafcadio Hearn in Japanese Fairy Tales.

== Synopsis ==
An old couple lived in the mountains. The man cut wood, and the woman wove, every day. One day, the man found a spring and drank from it. He became a young man. Delighted, he ran home. His wife said a young man needed a young wife, so she would go and drink, but they should not both be away, so he should wait. He did wait, but when she did not come back, he went after her. He found a baby by the spring; his wife had drunk too eagerly. Saddened, he carried her back, and realized that by the time the baby reached adulthood, he would become an old man again. Throughout history people are discovering magical pools and streams that will give second chances again.

== See also ==
- Shita-kiri Suzume
- The Myth of Ponce de León and the Fountain of Youth | HISTORY
