= Hanasaka Jiisan =

Japanese folk tale

Hanasaka Jiisan (花咲か爺さん), is a Japanese folk tale.

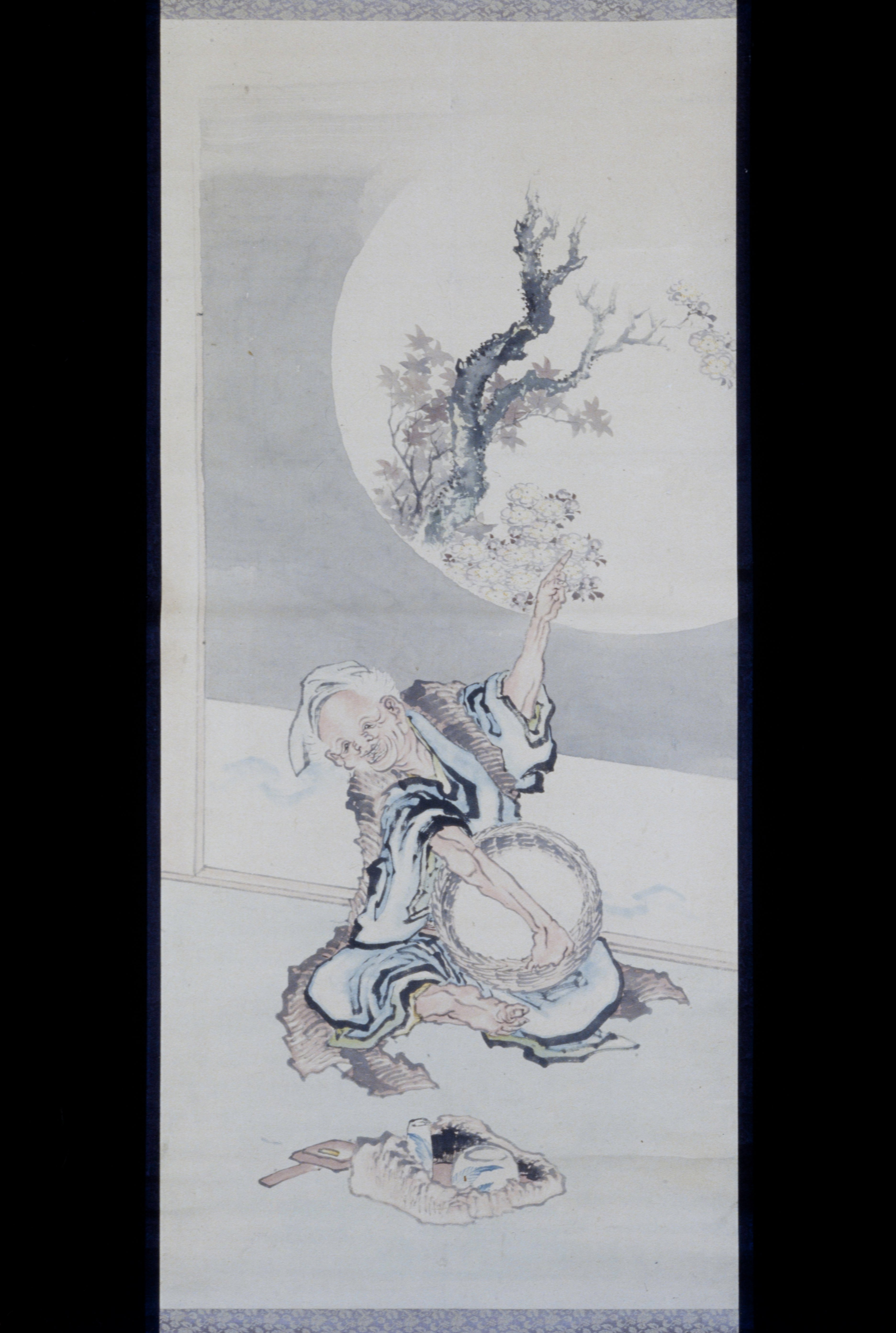
After Katsushika Hokusai - Hanasaka Jiji

Algernon Bertram Freeman-Mitford collected it in Tales of Old Japan (1871), as "The Story of the Old Man Who Made Withered Trees to Blossom". Rev. David Thomson translated it as "The Old Man Who Made the Dead Trees Blossom" for Hasegawa Takejirō's Japanese Fairy Tale Series (1885). This story is featured in the NCERT 7th Standard English Text “Honeycomb” as “The Ashes That Made Trees Bloom by William Elliot Griffis.”Andrew Lang included it as "The Envious Neighbor" in The Violet Fairy Book (1901), adapting it from a German text in Japanische Märchen compiled by David August Brauns (the original German title being Der neidische Nachbar).

== Synopsis ==
An old childless couple loved their dog. One day, it dug in the garden, and they found a box of gold coins there. A neighbor thought the dog must have the ability to find treasure, and managed to borrow the dog. When it dug in his garden, there were only bones, so he killed the dog in rage. He told the couple that the dog had just dropped dead. They grieved and buried it under the fig tree where they had found the treasure. One night, the dog's master dreamed that the dog told him to chop down the tree and make a mortar from it. He told his wife, who said they must do as the dog asked. When they did, the rice put into the mortar turned into gold. The neighbor borrowed it, but the rice turned to foul-smelling berries, and he and his wife smashed and burned the mortar.

That night, in a dream, the dog told his master to take the ashes and sprinkle them on certain cherry trees. When he did, the cherry trees came into bloom, and the daimyō (feudal landlord), passing by, marveled and gave him many gifts. The neighbor tried to do the same, but the ashes blew into the daimyō's eyes, so he threw him into prison; when he was let out, his village would not let him live there anymore, and he could not, with his wicked ways, find a new home.
