= Kasa Jizō =

Japanese folk tale

Kasa Jizō (笠地蔵) is a Japanese folk tale about an old couple whose generosity is rewarded by Jizō, the Japanese name for the bodhisattva Kṣitigarbha. The story is commonly handed down by parents to their children in order to instill moral values, as it is grounded in Buddhist thought.

An alternative title, Kasako Jizō can be found in Iwate and Fukushima Prefectures. Its origins are in the Tōhoku and Niigata regions, with the oldest dispensations coming from Hokuriku, as well as areas of Western Japan such as Hiroshima and Kumamoto Prefectures. Its precise origin, however, remains unknown.

== Summary ==
One day in the snowy country there lived an incredibly impoverished elderly couple. On New Year's Eve, the couple realized that they were unable to afford mochi (a staple form of rice eaten during the New Year). The old man decided to go into town to sell his home-made kasa (bamboo hats), but his endeavors proved unsuccessful. Due to the horrible weather conditions, the old man gave up the task and made his trek back home. In the blizzard, the old man came across a line of Jizō statues, to whom he decided to give his kasa as an offering, as well to keep their heads clear of snow. However, he only had enough kasa on hand to give to all but one statue. He gave the remaining statue his tenugui and went on his way. Upon returning home, he relayed the scenario to his wife, who praised him for his virtuous deed, without criticizing his inability to purchase any New Year mochi.

That evening, while the couple was asleep, there came a heavy thumping sound from outside the house. They opened the door to find a great pile of treasures, consisting of such goods as rice, vegetables, gold coins, and mochi. The old couple watched on as the Jizō statues marched off into the snowy distance. Having repaid the old man for his selflessness, the Jizo enabled the couple to celebrate the New Year.

== Analysis ==
While the tale has its visual basis in the bodhisattva Kṣitigarbha, the reciprocal character as expressed by the statues is reminiscent of the Shintō deities known as toshigami. These deities are generally believed to bring about good fortune for the New Year and exist in a variety of regional forms, such as the Namahage of Akita Prefecture and the Toshidon of Kagoshima Prefecture. A similar comparison can be made regarding the marebito. Furthermore, while the presence of multiple Jizō tends to amount to six (in reference to the Jizō of the Six Realms motif), variations within the story exist such as there being only one, three, seven, or as many as twelve statues.

== Variations ==
Some variations of the story are as follows:

- The old man gives his own kasa in place of a tenugui
- One Jizō statue returns the old man's gift rather than a group of statues
- In place of Jizō, the Seven Lucky Gods repay the old man
- In place of gifts, the old couple are escorted to the Western Pure Land

There is a version of this story in Niigata called Chijimi Jizō wherein the old man uses ojiyachijimi fabric instead of a kasa. In another version, the old man's wife creates spools of thread to be sold in town. In Western Japan, there is a variation wherein the old man carries a Jizō statue back to his house. His wife becomes angry and rice pours out of the statue's body. Greedy for more rice, the wife pounds the statue's belly, at which point the rice stops flowing.

== See also ==
- Japanese folktales
