= Koshindo =

Koshindo may refer to:

- The ancient name of Taejonggyo, a Korean religion

== See also (note spelling and pronunciation) ==
- Koshinto, meaning ancient Shinto
- A Japanese folk faith Kōshin, or a shrine related to it Kōshin-dō (庚申堂, kōshin-dō), e.g. The Yasaka Kōshin-dō, located in Kyoto, Japan
