= Yasaka Kōshin-dō =

Small Temple, Higashiyama 7th Century, Japan

Coordinates: 34°59′53.8″N 135°46′43.4″E

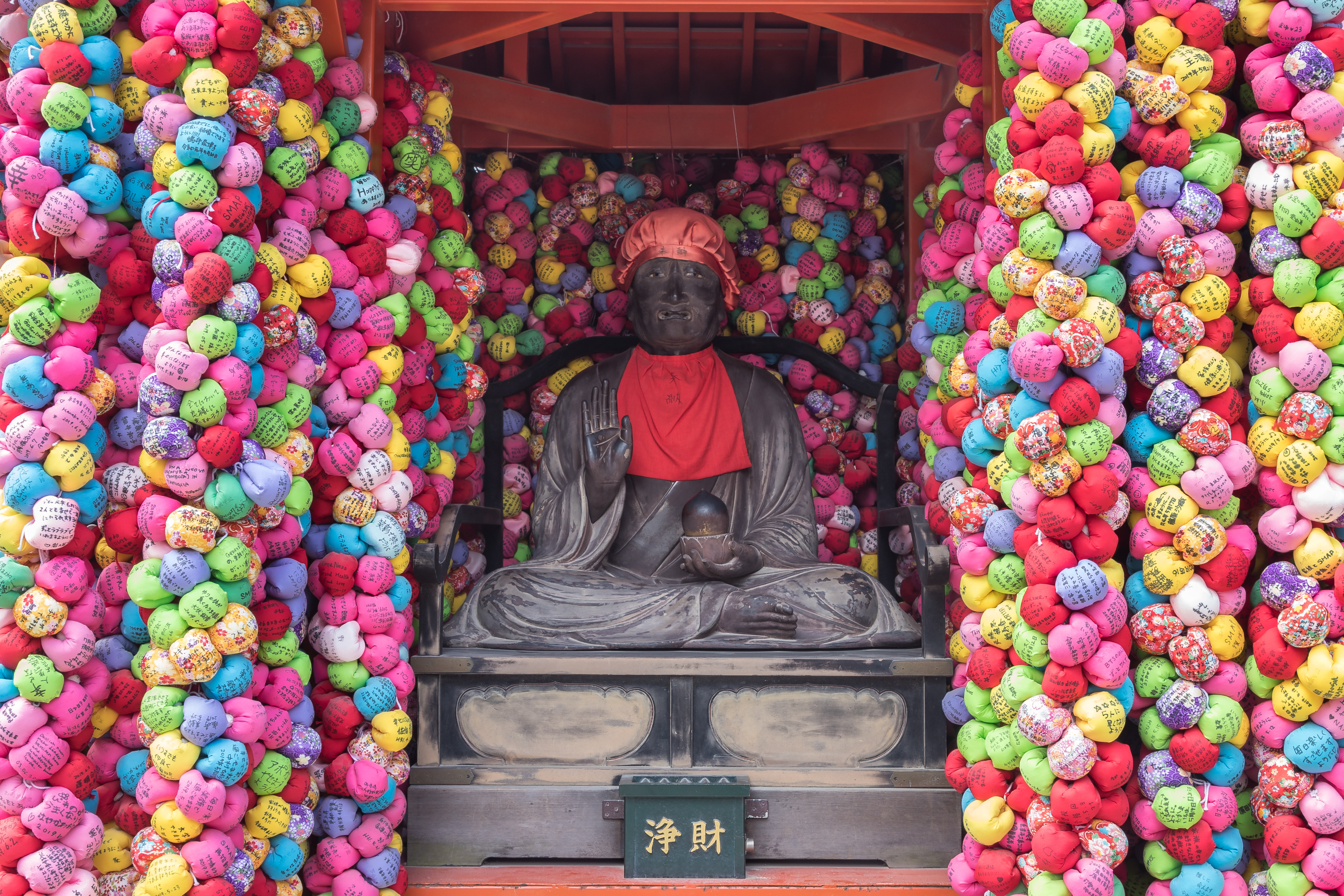
Multi-coloured kukurizaru in 2019

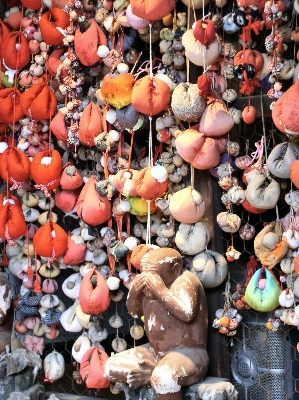
Kukurizaru in 2007

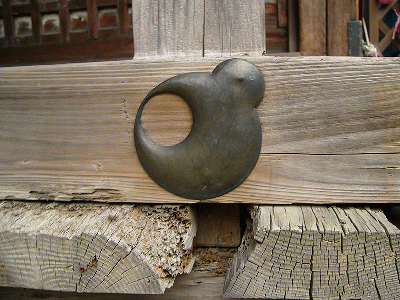
The Kōshin-dō symbol

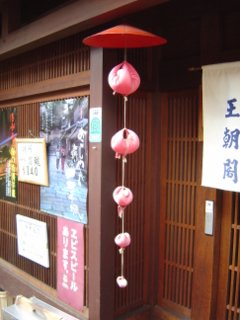
The Kukurizaru talismans

Yasaka Kōshin-dō (八坂庚申堂), or in its full name Daikoku-san Kongō-ji Kōshin-dō (大黒山金剛寺庚申堂) is a small temple located in Higashiyama, Kyoto, Japan. The temple is located near Kiyomizu-dera.

The temple is dedicated to Kōshin-san (庚申さん) a nickname of its main worship object Shōmen Kongō (青面金剛), a blue, guardian warrior and to the "three wise monkeys". They represent the Kōshin faith.
