= Mori Sosen =

Japanese artist (1747–1821)

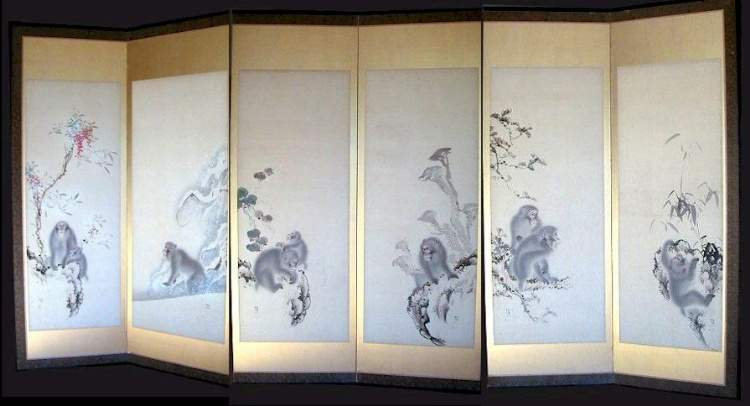
Folding screen

Mori Sosen (森 狙仙; 1747 – August 18, 1821) was a Japanese painter of the Shijō school during the Edo period.

Mori Sosen is famous for his many paintings depicting monkeys. He also painted other animals, such as deer, boars, and peafowl. Robert van Gulik called him "an undisputed master" of the painting of the Japanese macaque. When a gibbon was brought in Japan by the Dutch in 1809, creating somewhat of a sensation (gibbons had long been depicted by Japanese artists, based on Chinese paintings of the animal, but no one in Japan had seen a live gibbon for centuries), it was Mori who had created a graphic record of this event as well.

It is unknown whether he was born in Osaka, Nagasaki, or Nishinomiya, but he lived in Osaka for most of his life.

== Gallery ==
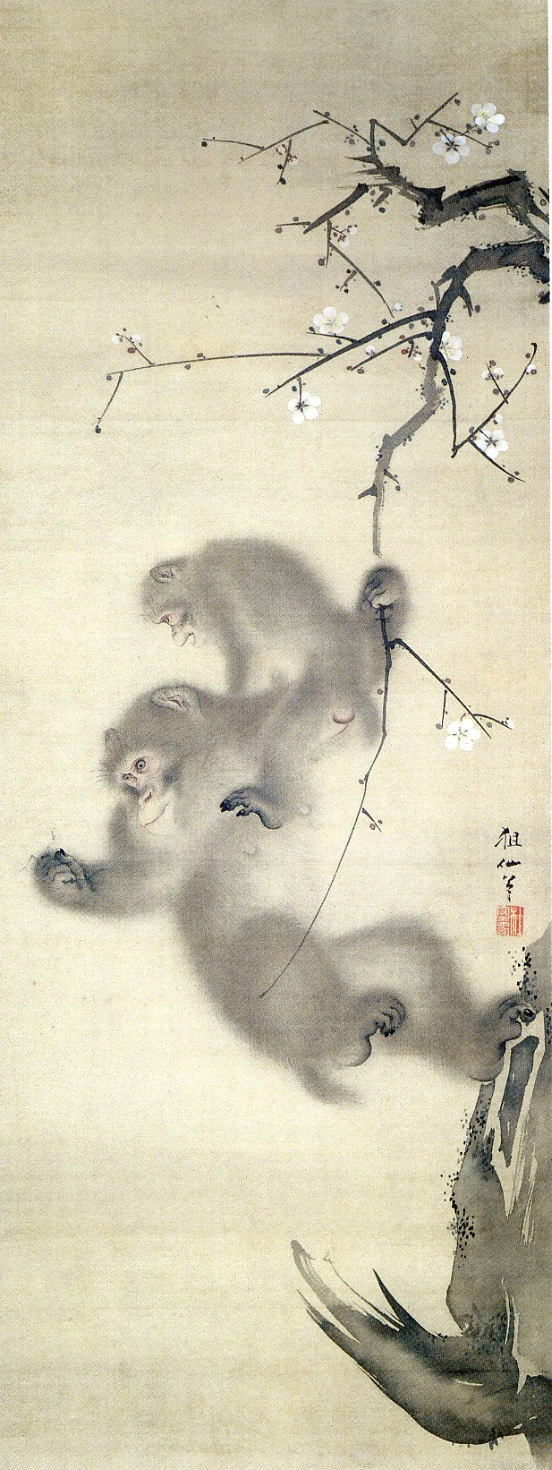
Monkeys in a plum tree

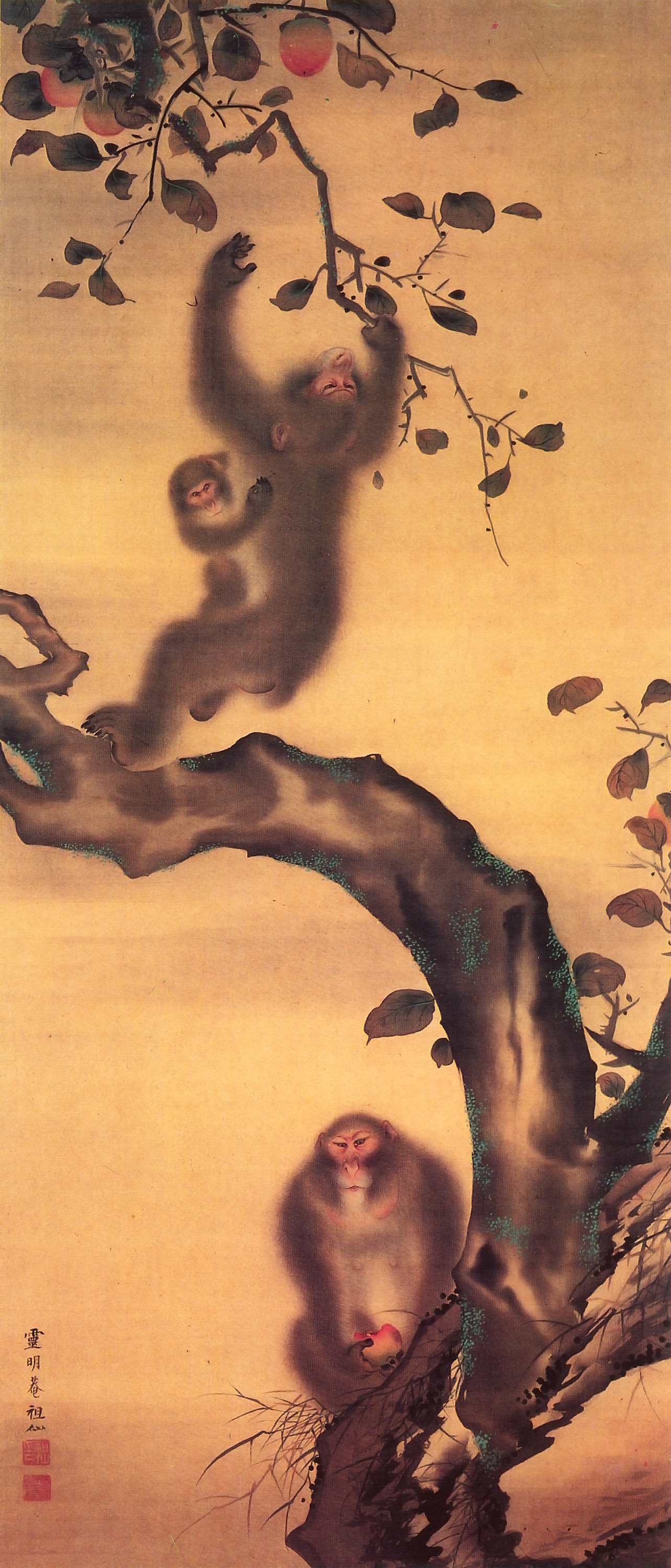
Apes in a persimmon-tree

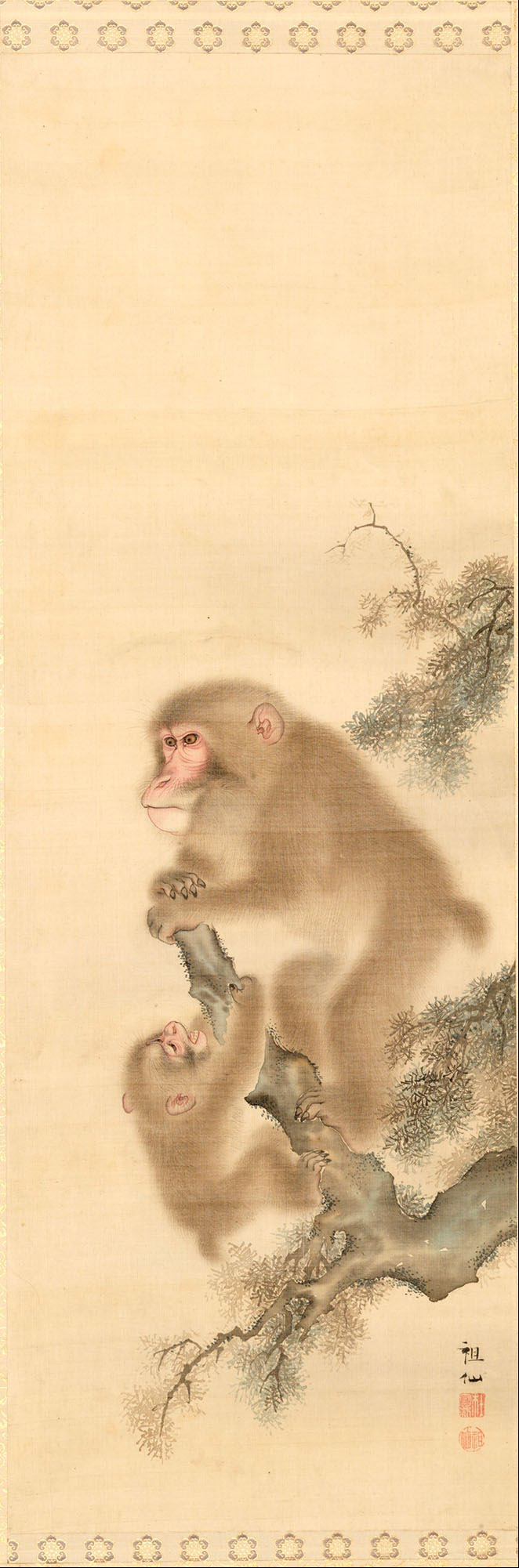
Monkeys

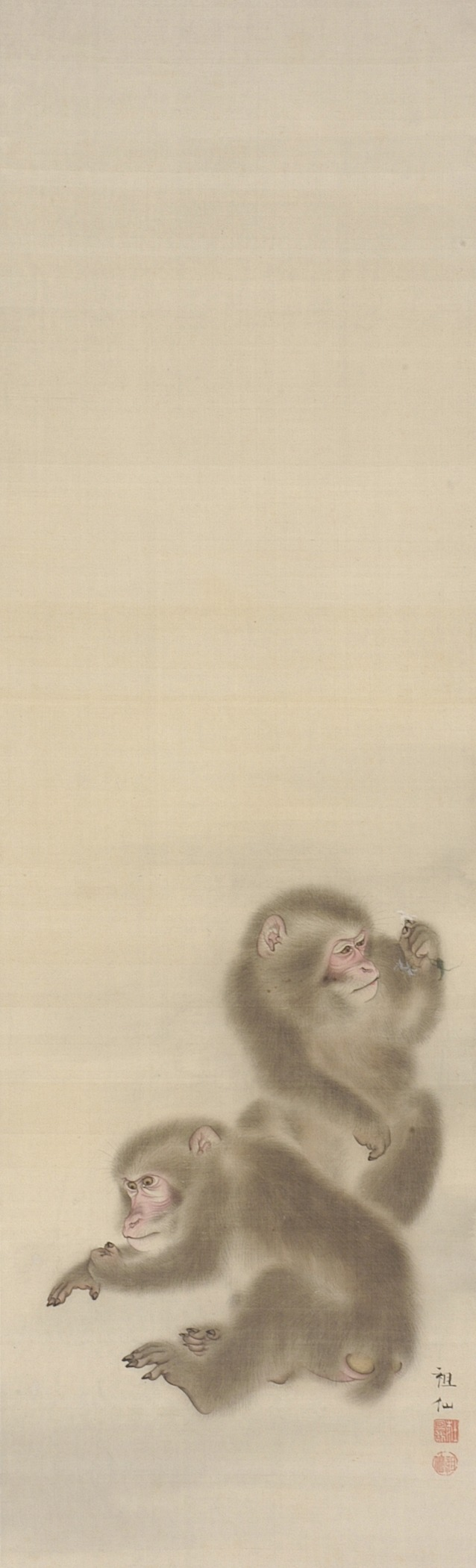
Two monkeys

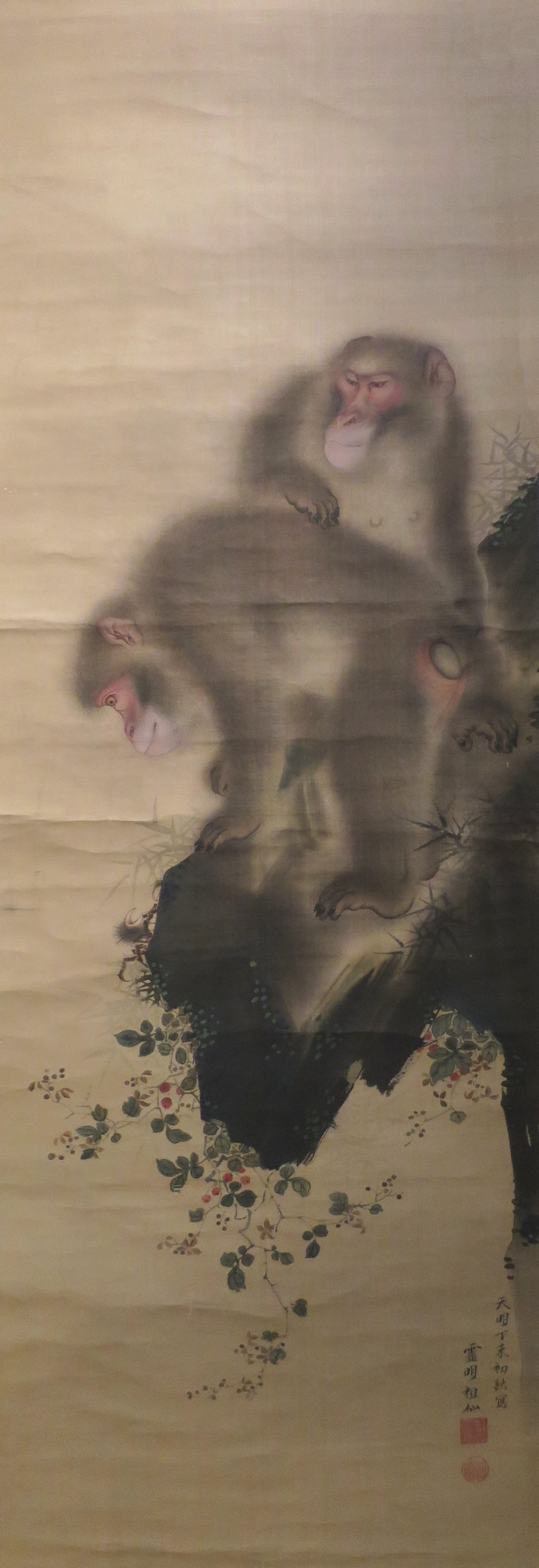
Monkeys playing with a crab

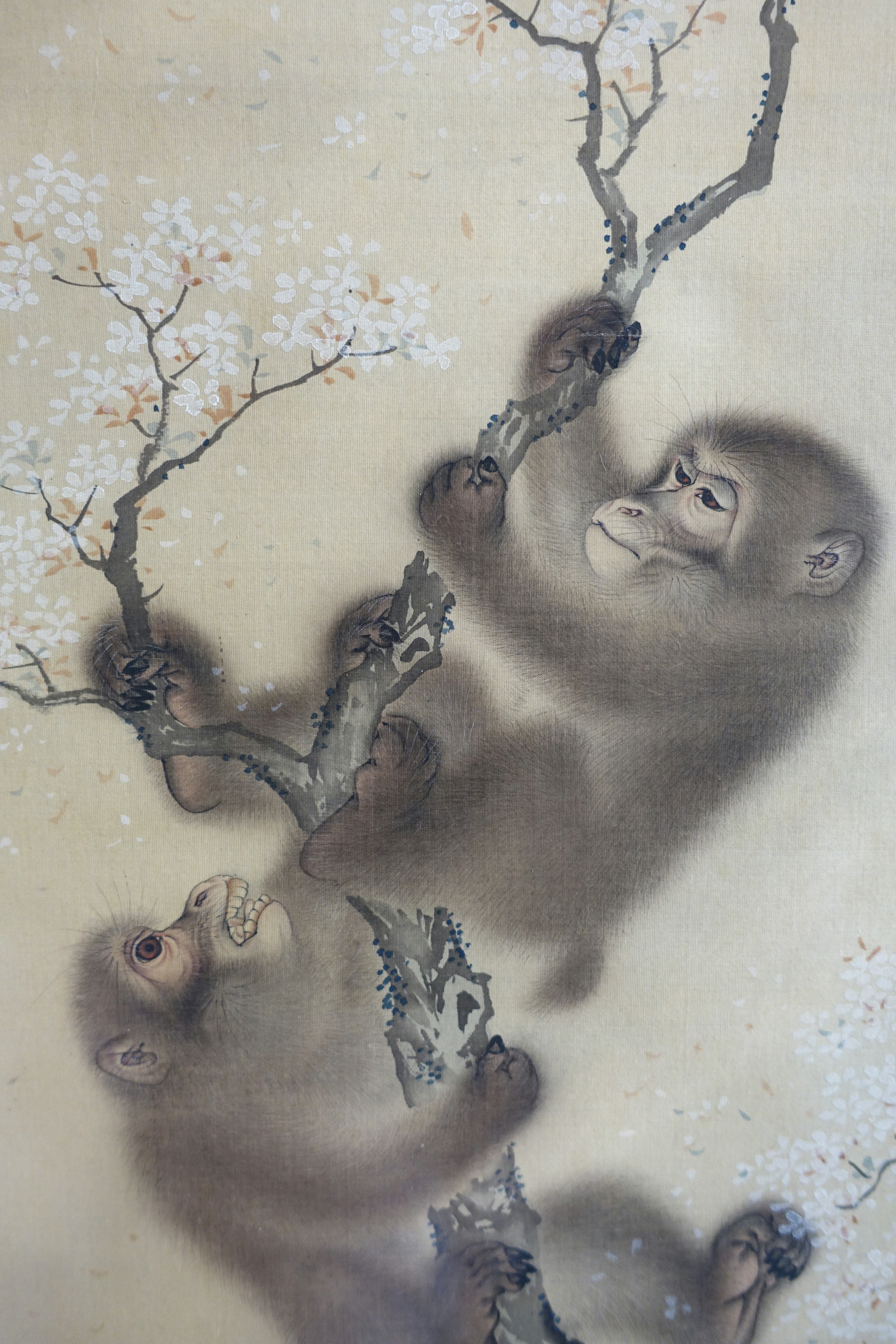
Monkeys in a blossoming cherry tree

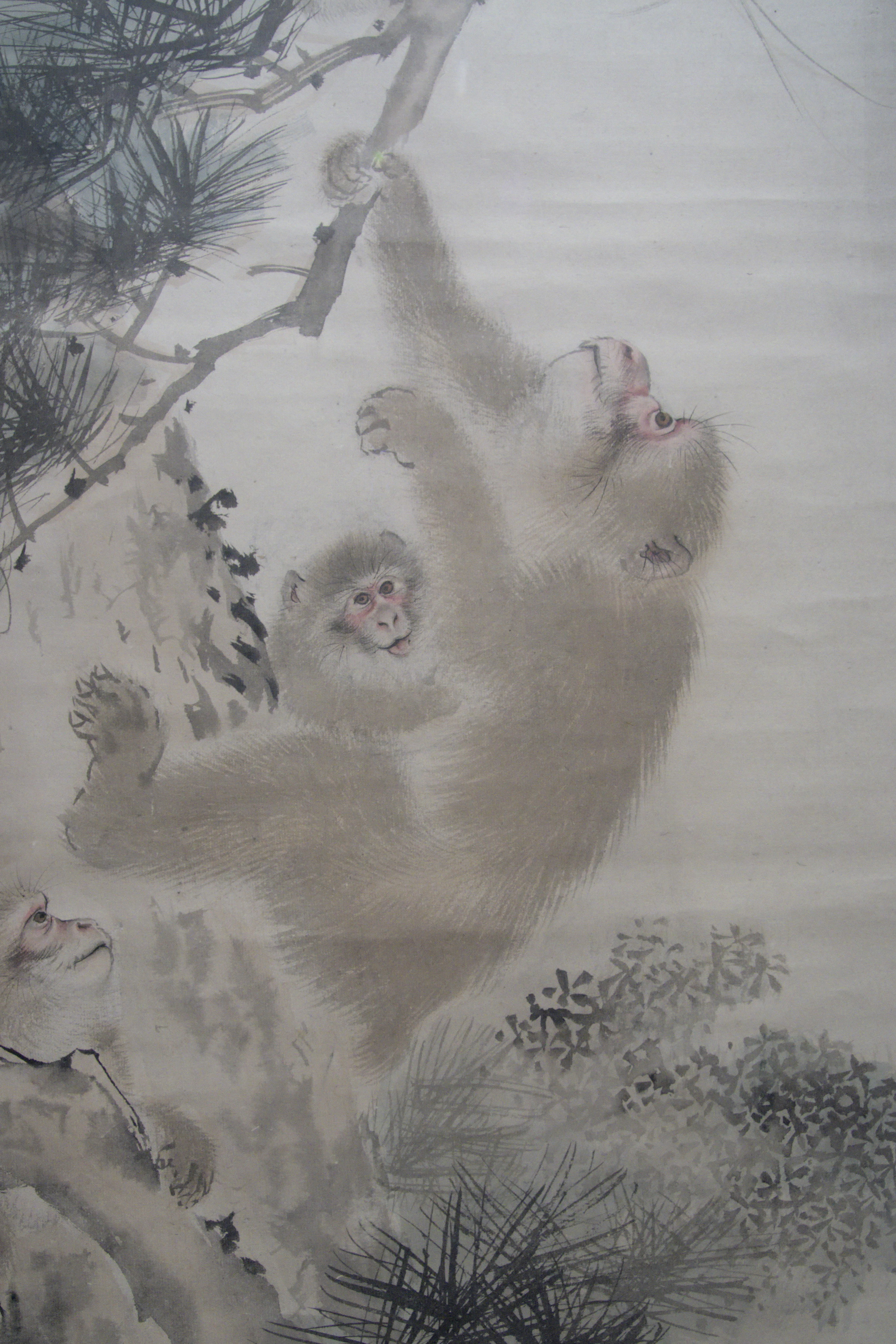
Monkeys in the pines in front of a waterfall

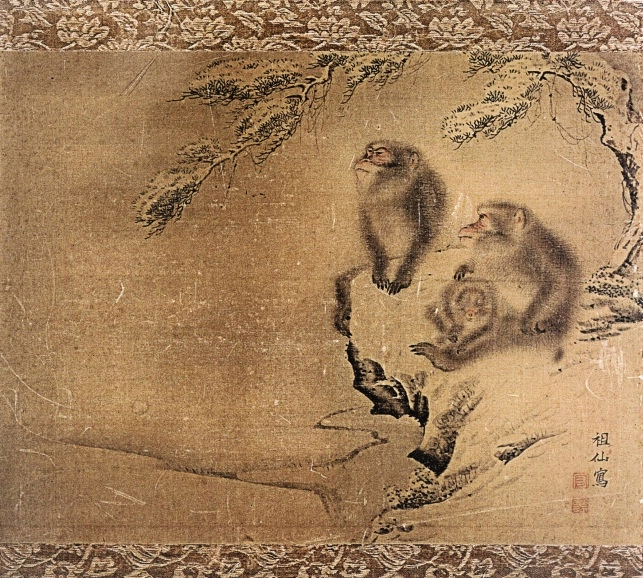
Monkeys in the snow

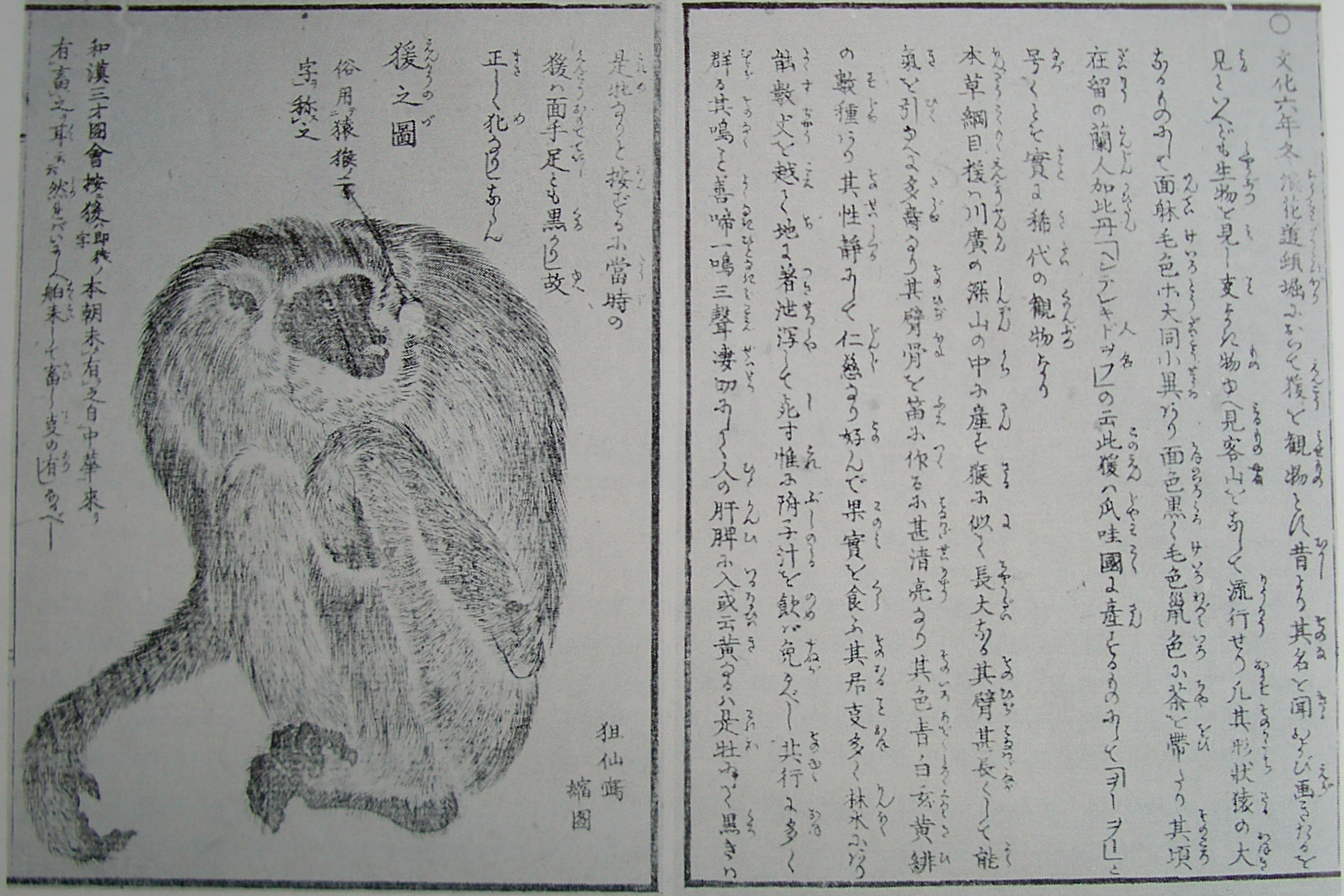
Graphic record of the first gibbon imported to Japan.

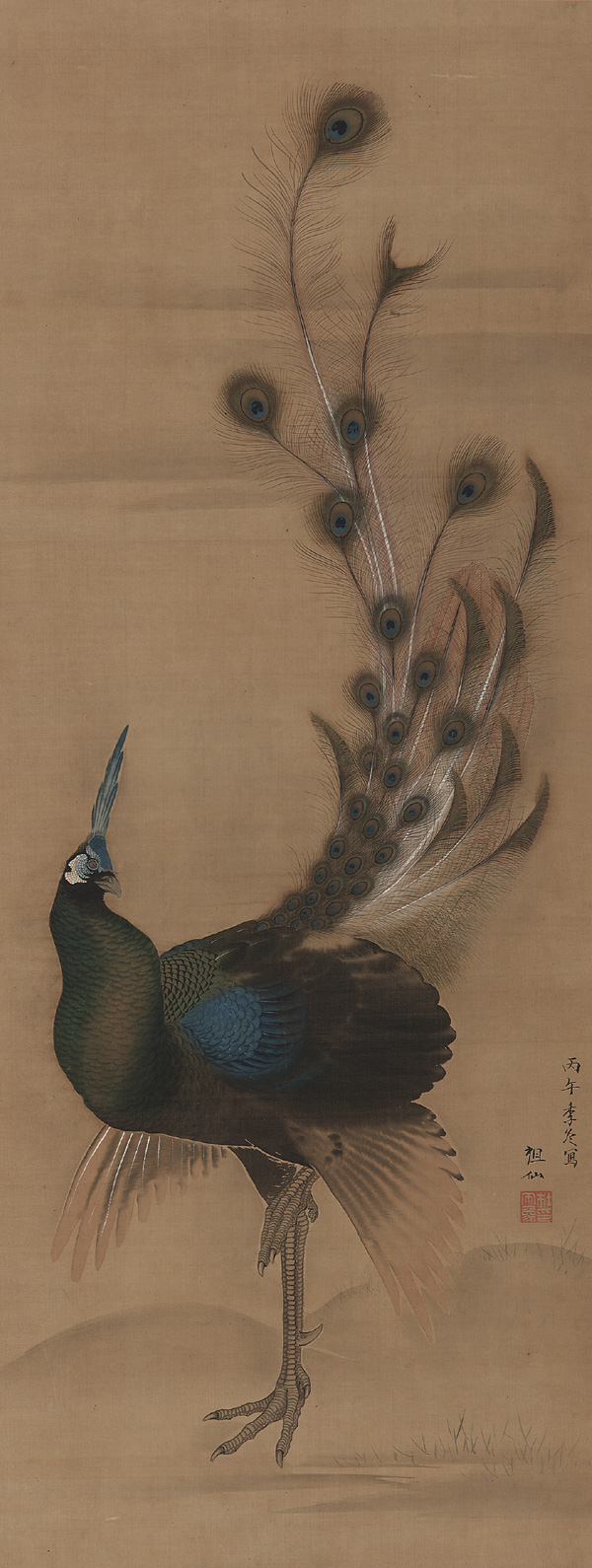
Peacock

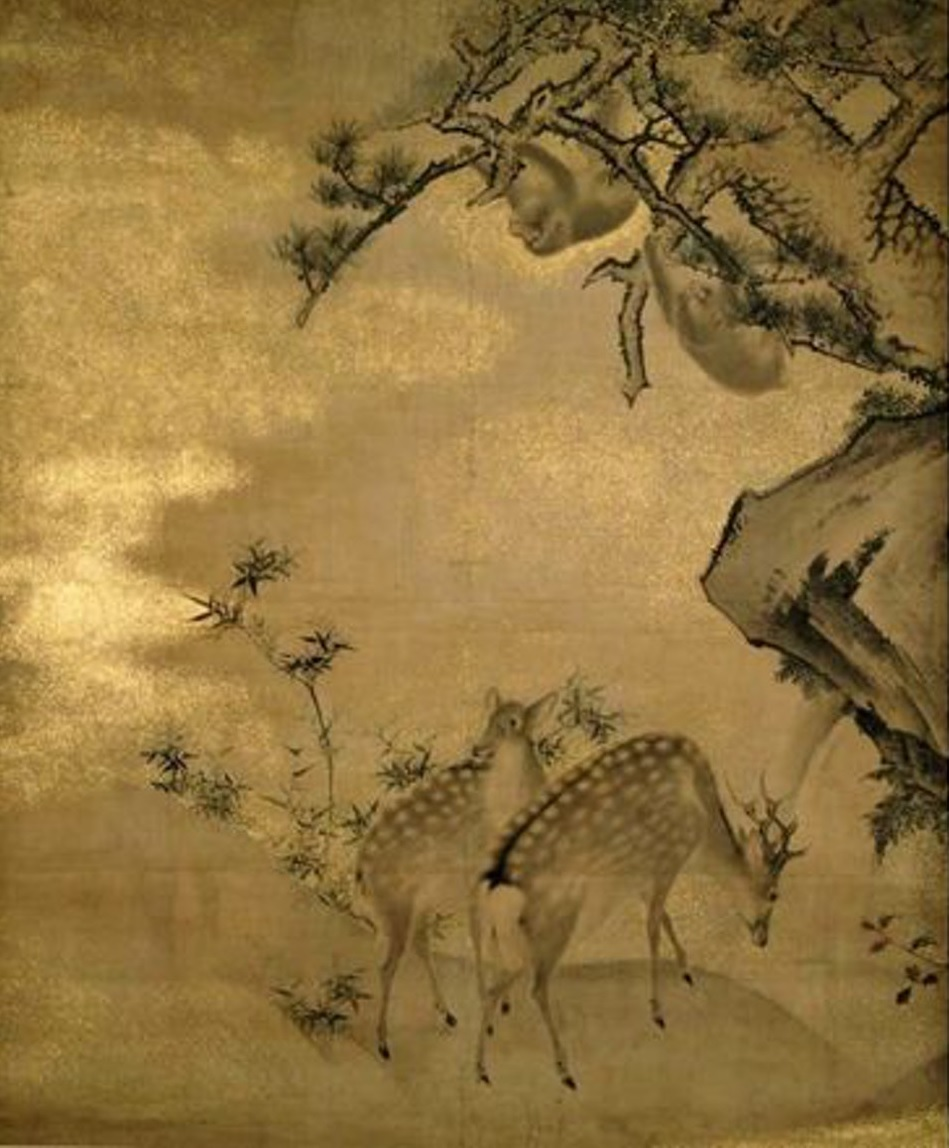
Painting of a couple of deer, with two monkeys in a tree.

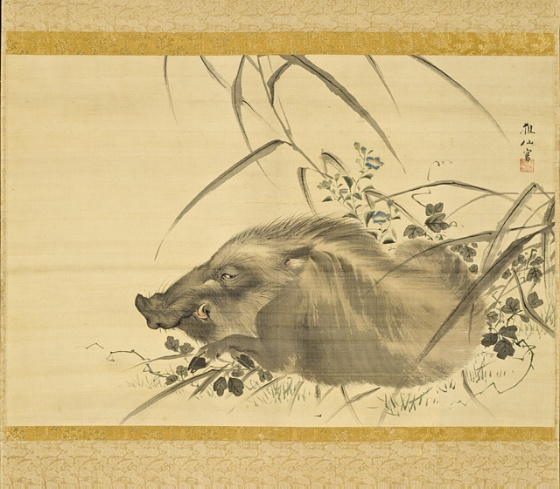
Wild boar amidst autumn flowers and grasses
