= Kōshin belief =

Folk religion

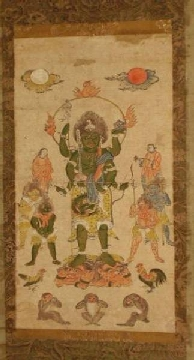
A Kōshin scroll

Kōshin (庚申) or Kōshin-shinkō (庚申信仰) is a folk belief in Japan with Taoist origins, influenced by Shinto, Buddhism and other local beliefs.

An event related to the belief is called Kōshin-kō (庚申講), held on the Kōshin days that occur every 60 days in accordance with the Chinese sexagenary cycle. On this day some believers stay awake to prevent Sanshi (三尸), entities believed to live inside the bodies of believers, from leaving during that night in order to report the deeds of believers to the god Tentei.

It is not known when this belief arrived in Japan, but it was widespread among the nobles of the imperial court by some time in the 9th century. The Japanese monk Ennin, visiting Tang China in 838, wrote that "This night no one sleeps. It is the same as New Year's Eve and the nights of Kōshin in our country." In the Muromachi period, Buddhist monks started to write about Kōshin and spread the belief to a wider public. Numerous monuments or pillars called Kōshin-tō (庚申塔) (or also Kōshin-zuka (庚申塚)) were erected all over the country, and the belief remained very popular during the Edo period. However, after the Meiji government issued the Shinto and Buddhism Separation Order in 1872, Kōshin and other folk beliefs were officially rejected as superstitions.

Belief in Kōshin survives, although it is far less popular than it once was. Many Kōshin-tō have been moved inside Buddhist temples or private homes, but many remain alongside roads and there are still some well-maintained Kōshin-dō (庚申堂) (Kōshin halls) either attached to Buddhist temples or standing alone.

== Deities and customs ==
The most ancient Kōshin custom is that of staying awake one special night every sixty days. This night is called Kōshin-Machi (庚申待 - Kōshin Waiting).

The main Kōshin belief is the concept that Three Corpses, or Sanshi (三尸), live in every human body. The Sanshi keep track of the deeds of the person they inhabit. On the night called Kōshin-Machi, the Sanshis leave the body and go to Tentei (天帝), the Heavenly God, to report the deeds of that person. Tentei then punishes bad people, making them ill, shortening their lifespans or, in extreme cases, ending their lives. Believers in Kōshin try to live without performing bad deeds, but those who believe that they have reason to fear try to stay awake during Kōshin nights, as the only way to prevent the Sanshi from reporting to Tentei.

In the Edo period, Kōshin-Machi became more popular among commoners, leading to a proliferation of festivities and cultic activities. Many of these practices centered on the worship of specific deities. These deities were visualized in hanging scrolls, icons, and stone carvings, many of which continue to dot the rural landscape of Japan today. One specially prominent god in the Kōshin cult was Shōmen-Kongō (Blue-Faced Vajra-Yakṣa), a fearsome deity with many arms. The first scriptures that established his connection with Kōshin were produced in the context of esoteric Buddhist rituals performed at the temple known as Onjōji or Miidera. Another temple crucial in the early development of this cult was Shitennō-ji. Shōmen-Kongō became Kōshin-san when people expected this deity to make the Sanshis themselves ill and prevent them from going to Tentei.

== See also ==
- Yasaka Kōshin-dō

== References and further reading ==
- Emiko Ohnuki-Tierney, The Monkey as Mirror: Symbolic Transformations in Japanese History and Ritual (Asian Studies/Anthropology), Princeton University Press, 1989, ISBN 978-0-691-02846-0
- Kubo, Noritada (窪 徳忠) Kōshin Shinkō no Kenkyū: Nitchū Shūkyō Bunka Kōshō-shi (庚申信仰の研究―日中宗教文化交渉史) (Research on Belief in Kōshin - A History of Cultural-Religious Exchange, Nihon Gakujutsu Shinkō-kai, 1961.
- Emiko Ohnuki-Tierney, Illness and Culture in Contemporary Japan: An Anthropological View, Cambridge University Press, 1984, ISBN 978-0-521-27786-0
- Lafcadio Hearn, Japan's Religions: Shinto and Buddhism, Kessinger Publishing Co, 2003, ISBN 978-0-7661-7657-7
- Ichiro Hori, Folk Religion in Japan: Continuity and Change, University of Chicago Press, 1974, ISBN 978-0-226-35334-0
- Livia Kohn, Daoism and Chinese Culture, Three Pines Press, 2005, ISBN 978-1-931483-00-1
- Richard Bowring, The Religious Traditions of Japan, Cambridge University Press, 2005, ISBN 978-0-521-85119-0
- Three-Monkeys site with related research and information
