= Eloise Gardener =

- Once Upon a Time episode
- Episode no.: Season 7 Episode 7
- Directed by: Alex Kalymnios
- Written by: David H. Goodman; Brigitte Hales

Guest appearances
- Adelaide Kane as Drizella/Ivy; Emma Booth as Witch/Gothel; Rose Reynolds as Alice/Tilly; Meegan Warner as Rapunzel; Christopher Gauthier as William Smee (Wish Realm)

Episode chronology
← Previous "Wake Up Call"	Next → "Pretty in Blue"
- Once Upon a Time season 7

"Eloise Gardener" is the seventh episode of the seventh season and the 140th episode overall of the American fantasy-drama series Once Upon a Time. Written by David H. Goodman & Brigitte Hales and directed by Alex Kalymnios, it premiered on ABC in the United States on November 17, 2017.

In the episode, Hook's encounter with Rapunzel and its ties to Alice is revealed in a flashback, while Rogers search for a missing woman comes into play in the present day, and Ivy's scheme to take down Victoria accelerates into disarray.

== Plot ==
=== Opening sequence ===
The Witch's secret garden and a magic stone is featured in the background.

=== In the Characters' Past ===
In the Wish Realm, shortly after Snow White and Prince Charming have stopped Regina from casting her curse, Regina approaches Hook to inform him of the turn of events and tells him that she's in need of magic if they are to have any hope of carrying out their planned missions. Hook agrees to venture off into another realm to obtain magic for her from a witch.

Upon reaching the top of the witch's tower, Hook finds a woman named Rapunzel, who claims to have been magically locked in the tower by the witch and instructs him to locate a golden flower that could help the both of them. While in the garden, Hook and Smee awaken a giant gnome but are able to find the flower. Hook sends Smee back to the crew, while he goes back to Rapunzel and offers his assistance. Rapunzel thanks him, but suddenly starts seducing him, and they have intercourse. The next morning, a baby appears in the tower as Rapunzel reveals herself to have been the witch Gothel in disguise. Gothel explains to Hook that the baby is a product of their night together and that she had planned it so that she could escape, as the tower's spell requires someone in her bloodline to be left behind in her place. Gothel jumps out of the tower and leaves Hook and the baby behind.

Hook returns to his crew and decides to hand over the Jolly Roger to Smee, as he tells Regina that he's calling off his mission against the Dark One to deal with a more important matter. He returns to the tower to raise his newborn daughter, whom he decides to name Alice, after his mother.

=== In Seattle ===
In Hyperion Heights, Rogers is more determined than ever to find out what happened to Eloise Gardener. Henry insists on helping him get to the bottom of the case and they also recruit the street-wise Tilly. However, Victoria has been made aware of Rogers' mission and tells Weaver to throw him off of the case. After some digging, Tilly reports back to Rogers and Henry and tells them that some fellow street kids had informed her that Eloise had died a while back. Rogers is devastated by the news but is still feeling as if something isn't quite right. In a talk with Weaver about the conclusion of the case, Rogers realizes that Weaver and Tilly had conspired to feed him false information. Weaver warns Rogers that the Eloise Gardener he seeks is not who he thinks she is. Despite this, Rogers heads over to Belfrey Towers to confront Victoria.

Around the same time, Victoria is about to carry out a different consequence to a continuously un-cooperative Gothel. However, Rogers arrives and finds the two women, mistakenly believing that Gothel is the missing girl and addresses her as Eloise, an identity she is all too willing to assume as he rescues her from Victoria. The police show up to arrest Victoria, who tells Drizella that she has yet to comprehend the true threat Gothel poses to the world. Tilly also shows up to the scene to apologize to Rogers for lying but he only tells her how disappointed he is in her. He drives away from the scene in an ambulance with Gothel, and Gothel glares at Tilly, recognizing her as the child she abandoned.

In between the events, Regina tries to put some distance between Henry and Jacinda, who are working together on the food truck. She offers Jacinda a job at the bar, and when Jacinda is about to take the next step with Henry, Regina suggests that getting involved with a man might not be the best move in the eyes of Child Protective Services. Jacinda ends up blowing off a date with Henry due to this advice. Henry shows up later that night to deliver the good news that Belfrey has been arrested, and Jacinda runs off to get Lucy, only to be greeted by Child Services, who takes Lucy away from Jacinda.

== Casting ==
- Mekia Cox was credited in this episode, but does not appear.

== Reception ==
=== Reviews ===
The episode received positive reviews from critics.

Paul Dailly of TV Fanatic gave it a 3.5 out of 5 stars.

Entertainment Weekly's Justin Kirkland gave it a B.
