= Once Upon a Time season 7 =

Once Upon a Time
- Season 7
- DVD cover
- Starring: Lana Parrilla; Colin O'Donoghue; Andrew J. West; Dania Ramirez; Gabrielle Anwar; Alison Fernandez; Robert Carlyle; Mekia Cox
- No. of episodes: 22

Release
- Original network: ABC
- Original release: October 6, 2017 – May 18, 2018

Season chronology
- ← Previous; Season 6

The seventh and final season of the American ABC fantasy-drama series Once Upon a Time was ordered on May 11, 2017. It premiered on October 6, 2017, and concluded on May 18, 2018, having aired on Fridays instead of Sundays in prior seasons. Lana Parrilla, Colin O'Donoghue, and Robert Carlyle return as principal cast members from the previous season, and are joined by new additions Andrew J. West, Alison Fernandez, Dania Ramirez, Gabrielle Anwar, and Mekia Cox. The storyline is softly rebooted with a main narrative led by an adult Henry Mills (West), set several years after the previous season's events.

Existing fictional characters introduced to the series during the season include Tiana, Mother Gothel, Eudora, Dr. Facilier, Prince Naveen, Madame Leota, and Captain Ahab. The season also introduced new iterations of various characters from previous seasons, including Cinderella, Lady Tremaine, Drizella, Anastasia, Rapunzel, Jack, Hansel, Gretel, and the Blind Witch, as well as Alice, another version of whom previously appeared in Once Upon a Time in Wonderland.

== Premise ==
Several years after the final battle, Henry Mills leaves Storybrooke in search of his own story, only to find himself in the New Enchanted Forest, where a conflict among its inhabitants culminates in the casting of a new curse that sends them to a Seattle neighborhood known as "Hyperion Heights", and back to the past, before Henry left Storybrooke. As Henry's daughter Lucy sets out to restore his belief, Mother Gothel seeks to reclaim her former home by using her Coven of the Eight, while Lady Tremaine, Drizella, Dr. Facilier, and Hansel pursue their own agendas. The eventual breaking of the curse leads to the arrival of the Wish Realm version of Rumplestiltskin, who seeks to destroy everyone’s happiness. His defeat leads Regina to cast a good variation of the Dark Curse, which merges all the realms into one: the United Realms.

== Cast and characters ==
=== Main ===
- Lana Parrilla as the Evil Queen / Regina Mills / Roni (Note: Also appears as the Wish Realm counterpart in "Eloise Gardener")
- Colin O'Donoghue as Captain Hook / Killian Jones / Rogers (Note: O'Donoghue portrays the Wish Realm version of the character for the entirety of the season, as well as the original counterpart in "A Pirate's Life" and "Leaving Storybrooke")
- Andrew J. West as Henry Mills
- Dania Ramirez as Cinderella / Jacinda Vidrio
- Gabrielle Anwar as Rapunzel / Lady Tremaine / Victoria Belfrey (Note: Credited until "Secret Garden")
- Alison Fernandez as Lucy Mills / Lucy Vidrio
- Robert Carlyle as Rumplestiltskin / Mr. Gold / Weaver (Note: Also appears as the Wish Realm counterpart in "Knightfall", "Is This Henry Mills?", "Homecoming", and "Leaving Storybrooke")
- Mekia Cox as Tiana / Sabine (Note: Credited as a recurring guest star from "Hyperion Heights" to "The Garden of Forking Paths" and later promoted to the main cast from "Greenbacks")

=== Recurring ===
- Jared S. Gilmore as young Henry Mills and Sir Henry (Wish Realm) (Note: Credited as a special guest star for "Leaving Storybrooke" and as a recurring guest star for the remaining episodes he appears in.)
- Adelaide Kane as Drizella / Ivy Belfrey
- Rose Reynolds as Alice / Tilly
- Bruce Blain as Samuel B. Ryce / Desk Sergeant
- Trevor Roberts as Remy
- Emma Booth as Mother Gothel / Mother Nature / Eloise Gardener
- Chris Gauthier as Smee (Wish Realm)
- Rebecca Mader as Zelena / the Wicked Witch of the West / Kelly West (Note: Credited as a special guest star for "Leaving Storybrooke" and as a recurring guest star for the remaining episodes she appears in.)
- Daniel Francis as Dr. Facilier / Mr. Baron Samdi
- Robin Givens as Eudora
- Meegan Warner as young Rapunzel / Lady Tremaine
- Tiera Skovbye as Robin Hood / Margot
- Nathan Parsons as Hansel / Jack / Nick Branson
- Yael Yurman as Anastasia
- Jeff Pierre as Prince Naveen / Drew
- Chilton Crane as the Blind Witch / Hilda Braeburn

=== Guest ===
- Jillian Fargey as the Fairy Godmother
- Liam Hall as the Prince
- Jennifer Morrison as Emma Swan (Note: Credited as a special guest star.)
- Emilie de Ravin as Belle (Note: Credited as a guest star for "Beauty" and as a special guest star for "Leaving Storybrooke".)
- Giles Matthey as Gideon
- Kevin Ryan as Robert
- Matty Finochio as Marcus Tremaine
- Cindy Luna as Cecelia
- Anna Cathcart as teenage Drizella
  - Lula Mae Melench as young Drizella
- Alejandra Perez as young Ella
- Sophia Reid-Gantzert as young Anastasia
- Sara Tomko as Tiger Lily
- Suzy Joachim as Madame Leota
- Nisreen Slim as the Hedge Witch / Dr. Andrea Sage
- Chad Rook as Captain Ahab
- Elle McKinnon as young Alice
- Charles Mesure as Blackbeard (Wish Realm)
- Kip Pardue as Chad
- Dan Payne as Ivo
- Seth Isaac Johnson as young Hansel
- Sara Canning as Gretel
  - Lily van der Griend as young Gretel
- Kyra Leroux as Yarrow
- Emily Tennant as Isla
- Naika Toussaint as Seraphina
- Gabrielle Miller as Mother Flora
- Beverley Elliott as Widow Lucas / Granny
- Robbie Kay as Malcolm / Peter Pan (Wish Realm)
- Victoria Smurfit as Cruella de Vil (Wish Realm)
- JoAnna Garcia Swisher as Ariel (Wish Realm)
- Timothy Webber as the Apprentice (Wish Realm)
- Ginnifer Goodwin as Snow White / Mary Margaret Blanchard
- Josh Dallas as Prince Charming / David Nolan
- Sean Maguire as Robin Hood
- Tony Amendola as Geppetto / Marco
- Lee Arenberg as Grumpy / Leroy
- Jack Davies as Pinocchio
- Faustino Di Bauda as Sleepy / Walter
- Gabe Khouth as Sneezy / Mr. Clark
- Keegan Connor Tracy as the Blue Fairy / Mother Superior
- Raphael Sbarge as Jiminy Cricket / Dr. Archie Hopper
- David Paul Grove as Doc

== Episodes ==
No. overall	No. in season	Title	Directed by	Written by	Original release date	US viewers (millions)
134	1	"Hyperion Heights"	Ralph Hemecker	Edward Kitsis & Adam Horowitz	October 6, 2017	3.26
In a flashback, an 18-year-old Henry says goodbye to Regina as he departs Storybrooke on a trip to new realms, in hopes of finding his own story. Many years later, Henry runs into Cinderella's carriage in the New Enchanted Forest and, after a string of events that almost get them captured at a ball, he offers her the chance at a new start back in Storybrooke, as he is due to return through a portal that evening. When Henry finds a glass slipper left for him at their meeting spot, he decides to stay behind. In present-day Seattle, an older Henry is reunited with his daughter Lucy, whom he does not remember because of a curse. In hopes of breaking it, Lucy leads him to her neighborhood of Hyperion Heights, home to many other cursed fairytale characters including Jacinda, Lucy's down-on-her-luck single mother who is in a contentious relationship with her powerful stepmother Victoria. Others include Roni (Regina Mills), a bar owner who is struggling with having to sell her establishment to Victoria, and Rogers (Wish Realm Hook), a cop who gets promoted to detective and is introduced to his new partner, Weaver (Rumplestiltskin).
135	2	"A Pirate's Life"	Tara Nicole Weyr	Jane Espenson & Jerome Schwartz	October 13, 2017	2.74
In a flashback to Storybrooke, Hook is training an 18-year-old Henry as Emma watches. She confesses to Hook that she worries that Henry is about to leave on his own. In order to comfort her, Hook shows her a bottle Henry can use to call on them if he gets into trouble. Many years later, as Henry is about to be captured by Lady Tremaine, he uses the bottle to call on Emma, Hook, and Regina for help, unwittingly calling in Wish Realm Hook as well. In the present, Victoria hires Rogers and Weaver to drive Henry out of the neighborhood. Rogers does not agree with Weaver's methods and helps Henry, instead. Rogers, Henry, and Roni end up forming an alliance against Victoria. Meanwhile, Jacinda has to find another way to be at Lucy's ballet recital after Victoria makes things difficult for her.
136	3	"The Garden of Forking Paths"	Ron Underwood	David H. Goodman & Brigitte Hales	October 20, 2017	2.49
In a flashback, Cinderella arrives at the spot in the forest where she is supposed to meet Henry, but does not find him there. She then meets Princess Tiana, who recruits her to be part of the resistance against Lady Tremaine. She leaves one of her glass slippers behind for Henry to find. A short while later, Henry, Regina, and Hook arrive at their campsite and join the efforts. Later, Cinderella sneaks into Tremaine's castle alone, where Tremaine reveals that she has kept her almost-deceased daughter Anastasia preserved since her "death" at age 14 and needs a pure heart to revive her. She tasks Cinderella with stealing Henry's, since he has the heart of the truest believer. In the present day, Jacinda tries to save Lucy's beloved community garden from Victoria, while Lucy takes a skeptical Henry on a trip under the garden lot in hopes of finding proof of everyone's fairytale pasts. Meanwhile, Henry, Roni, and Rogers find their first lead against Victoria. Rogers captures the man working with her, but is irritated to find Weaver setting the man free to use him as a future connection. It is then revealed that Victoria is not cursed and has been keeping a witch as her prisoner at the top of Belfrey Towers.
137	4	"Beauty"	Mick Garris	Dana Horgan & Leah Fong	October 27, 2017	2.44
In a flashback to Gideon's first birthday, Rumple and Belle decide to leave Storybrooke to travel the world. Years later, Rumple tells Belle that he wants to stop being the Dark One, so he can be mortal again and live out his life with her. Over the years, they search for ways to get rid of his Darkness. When Gideon is 18, Belle comes across a prophecy that leads them to the Edge of Realms, where they must wait for the sun's brightest set before they can be guided to the path Rumple must take to get rid of the Darkness. They build a home there as they wait for the event to occur. However, an aging Belle eventually admits that the "sun" of which the prophecy spoke was actually herself and that her death will mark the start of his journey. When Belle dies, Rumple sets off to search for a Guardian who will be able to take the Darkness from him, so that he can ultimately be reunited with Belle. In the present day, Tilly, who is actually Alice, begins to wake up from the curse after she stops taking pills given to her by Victoria and, after several attempts, manages to get Weaver to remember his true identity.
138	5	"Greenbacks"	Geofrey Hildrew	Christopher Hollier & Adam Karp	November 3, 2017	2.29
In flashbacks, Tiana seeks a prince to help save her kingdom and is guided by Dr. Facilier to a man named Robert. She soon realizes that Facilier had enlisted Robert to steal a magical ruby from her in exchange for reuniting him with his lover, who had been turned into a frog. In the present day, Sabine decides to run a pop-up beignet shop out of Mr. Cluck's with Jacinda's help. Victoria sends someone to burn the place down, which then causes friction between the two roommates. Rogers comes across a detainee at the police station who he thinks is connected to Eloise Gardener, the missing girl he's been trying to find. Meanwhile, Roni decides to investigate Ivy's interest in helping Henry. Ivy takes her to the top of the towers and Roni finds a photo of herself and a young Henry taken in Storybrooke. However, it is later revealed that Ivy hasn't been cursed either and has her own dealings with the witch, of which her mother is unaware.
139	6	"Wake Up Call"	Sharat Raju	Jerome Schwartz & Jane Espenson	November 10, 2017	2.37
In a flashback, Regina comes across Drizella, who is looking for magic to escape from her mother. When she reveals that she was actually born with magic, Regina begins to train her. However, after Regina runs into Rumple, who tells her that Lady Tremaine must have been aware of the magic lessons, the two women realize that Lady Tremaine was counting on using Drizella's heart to revive Anastasia. Drizella ends up blackening her own heart by killing the prince, making it unusable for revival, and vows to cast a curse like Regina's to make her mother suffer. In the present day, Roni struggles with what to believe about the mysterious photo, which is complicated by newly discovered information about "Regina Mills" into which Lucy encouraged her to look. Drizella gathers the ingredients for a plant that the witch then cultivates and, when she serves its essence to Roni, she wakes up and remembers her life as Regina. Drizella then reveals that she cast the curse and blackmails Regina into keeping Henry and Jacinda apart, reminding her of a special contingency that was put into the curse that would hurt her family if she didn't comply.
140	7	"Eloise Gardener"	Alex Kalymnios	David H. Goodman & Brigitte Hales	November 17, 2017	2.28
In a flashback in the Wish Realm, shortly after the Charmings stopped Regina from casting her curse, Hook agrees to grant her passage on the Jolly Roger in exchange for leading him to powerful magic guarded by a witch. When he arrives at the witch's tower, he finds Rapunzel instead. She instructs him to retrieve a golden flower from the witch's garden. When he returns with it to help her, they spend the night together. The next morning, it is revealed that Rapunzel is actually Gothel and their night together produced a baby, whom Gothel leaves behind so she can escape the tower. Hook gives the Jolly Roger to Smee and decides to stay with his daughter, who is unable to leave due to the tower's spell. He names her Alice after his own mother. In the present day, Rogers is on a mad hunt for Eloise with help from Henry and Tilly. Tilly later informs him that Eloise has died, but it turns out that the news was planted by Weaver to throw him off the case. When Rogers finds Gothel, he believes that she is Eloise and frees her from Victoria, who gets detained by police for kidnapping.
141	8	"Pretty in Blue"	Ralph Hemecker	Dana Horgan & Leah Fong	November 17, 2017	2.28
In flashbacks, Hook is reunited with Alice, who claims that they have been cured of their curse. However, when they try to embrace, Hook gets hurt and Alice runs away in fear. Henry and Cinderella chase her to Wonderland. Cinderella finds Alice, who tells her that she met Cinderella's mother before and that she was also afflicted with the Curse of the Poisoned Heart. Drizella appears in Wonderland to curse Henry, but Alice and Cinderella save him. Henry and Cinderella then share their first kiss. In the present day, Jacinda contacts Nick, a lawyer whom she has been cursed to believe is Lucy's father. He agrees to help her regain custody of Lucy, to Henry's dismay, and Lucy encourages Henry to fight for Jacinda. Drizella and Gothel plan to revive Anastasia but find her body is missing from her coffin. After Regina confronts Weaver, who refuses to confirm that he has woken up from the curse, she tells Henry she's heading to San Francisco to meet with someone who was pushed out of town by Victoria. He agrees to join her on the trip.
142	9	"One Little Tear"	Steve Pearlman	Christopher Hollier & Adam Karp	December 8, 2017	2.45
Victoria strikes a deal with Weaver in an attempt to free herself from jail and wake Anastasia. In flashbacks, Rapunzel steals from Mother Gothel's garden to save her family, and is trapped in a tower in exchange. After six years of captivity, Rapunzel escapes using her hair, but finds her husband Marcus has married Cecilia, gaining a stepdaughter, Ella. Gothel tempts Rapunzel with a Wonderland mushroom, which she uses to poison Cecilia's heart, leading to Cecilia running away. One day, Anastasia and Ella fall through thin ice but, to Rapunzel's disbelief, Marcus only manages to save Ella. Rapunzel seeks Gothel's help, who magically seals Anastasia's last breath with the price of keeping Anastasia in the tower. However, Rapunzel tricks Gothel, who becomes trapped in her own tower until someone in her bloodline takes her place. In the present, Victoria strangely gives full custody of Lucy to Jacinda, claiming to be a changed person. Victoria retrieves the Once Upon a Time book and shows Lucy her unfortunate life story as Rapunzel, convincing Lucy to give up her belief in happy endings. As Lucy sheds a tear, Victoria uses it to awaken Anastasia as Lucy falls unconscious.
143	10	"The Eighth Witch"	Ralph Hemecker	Jane Espenson & Jerome Schwartz	December 15, 2017	2.29
In a flashback, baby Lucy is born just as Drizella appears to deliver a prophecy about a curse. The heroes are able to turn Drizella to stone. Eight years later, everyone is celebrating Lucy's birthday when Gothel appears with her coven of witches, freeing Drizella. With the curse looming, Regina heads off to get help from Zelena. Later, when the heroes confront the witches, Gothel reveals that they have poisoned Henry and Regina is forced to cast Drizella's curse in order to save his life. In the present day, Regina locates a cursed Zelena in San Francisco, who now goes by Kelly. Regina is able to give Zelena her memories back and the two head back to Seattle, knowing that breaking the curse to help Lucy will hurt Henry. Rumple tests Anastasia to see if she is the Guardian. However, Gothel also wants Anastasia and severs her alliance with Drizella after the girl is brought to her, deeming Anastasia to be more useful in her coven. Gothel tells her that they need to find their fellow witches.
144	11	"Secret Garden"	Mick Garris	Edward Kitsis & Adam Horowitz	March 2, 2018	2.14
In a flashback, an 18-year-old Robin secretly dabbles in magic against her mother's wishes. After attempting a spell that leads her to Gothel, Robin disappears from Storybrooke and Zelena arrives in the New Enchanted Forest looking for her. Robin is excited to apprentice under Gothel, but soon finds out that she only wants her to be the sacrifice for a resurrection amulet to revive Madame Leota. In the present day, Regina and Zelena seek the amulet in hopes of using it to save Lucy, however, Tremaine acquires it first and hands it over to Gothel, not realizing that Gothel intends to use Drizella as the sacrifice. As the amulet's magic begins to drain Drizella's life, Tremaine decides to sacrifice herself to save her daughter and dies as Lucy begins to awaken. Elsewhere, a doctor who finds out about Lucy's true paternity is poisoned to death by a mysterious figure.
145	12	"A Taste of the Heights"	Nina Lopez-Corrado	David H. Goodman & Brigitte Hales	March 9, 2018	2.22
In a flashback to the day of Tiana's coronation, Facilier appears to warn her of a danger to her kingdom, which ends up sending her on a hunt for a giant alligator. She meets Prince Naveen at the wreckage site and, while the two don't get along, they agree to search for it together. When the alligator attacks them on a lake, Tiana is able to kill it, but Naveen is left gravely injured. When Facilier reappears to claim a necklace from inside of the beast, Tiana gets him to revive Naveen, but on a previously undisclosed condition that the prince is to be enslaved to him until further notice. In the present day, Sabine prepares for a food truck festival when an anonymous tip to the cops leaves her unable to participate. She accuses Drew, a former classmate-turned-food truck rival, of sabotage. However, it is revealed that Drew is under orders from Samdi, a mysterious investor, to get close to her for his own purposes. Regina figures out that Facilier isn't really cursed and it is revealed that they have a history tracing back to the Enchanted Forest. Meanwhile, Lucy discovers upsetting information about the current curse, while Rogers and Weaver discover that the neighborhood killer is going after witches in particular.
146	13	"Knightfall"	Steve Miner	Jerome Schwartz & Miguel Ian Raya	March 16, 2018	2.38
In flashbacks, after a young Alice has been receiving frightening visions of Gothel attacking her and Hook in the tower, Hook vows to help her escape and seeks help from the Rumplestiltskin in the Wish Realm. Rumple tells him to procure a magical fish hook from Captain Ahab. He wins it from Ahab over a die roll but, when Ahab comes back to taunt him about his former pirate status, Hook agrees to a pistol duel. When he returns to the tower, Hook and Alice find themselves branded and cursed by Gothel, who poisoned the bullet that hit him. In the present day, Rogers and Weaver interrogate Eloise about her cult, though she is only interested in playing mind games with Rogers. Tilly, who is experiencing a manic episode, desperately tries to convince the detectives to see Eloise for who she really is. When they deduce that Eloise was trying to mislead them about the case, they check up on Hilda in the hospital, only to find her dead, with Tilly holding a scalpel in the room.
147	14	"The Girl in the Tower"	Antonio Negret	Dana Horgan & Leah Fong	March 23, 2018	2.11
In a flashback, Alice makes a birthday wish to get out of the tower and, shortly after, a troll appears and helps her escape. Years later, Alice is caught spying on the resistance group by Robin, who had just recently arrived to the New Enchanted Forest. Robin intends to honor her father's legacy by hunting down Alice's troll, who has since been destroying villages, but Alice goes after her to protect it. In the present day, Rogers, Henry, and Tilly are looking for evidence of Tilly being elsewhere during the time of the baker's murder to clear her name. As she retraces her steps, Tilly grows frustrated when she finds that no one can remember seeing her at the places she visited. Meanwhile, Regina asks Facilier out on a date so that Lucy can break into his suite to look for clues as to what he seeks in Hyperion Heights.
148	15	"Sisterhood"	Ellen S. Pressman	Christopher Hollier & Adam Karp	March 30, 2018	2.03
In a flashback, Gothel recruits Drizella to compete for one of two spots in her coven. Drizella strikes a partnership with Gretel and they agree to help each other out on the course, but it turns out the real test was that one would have to kill the other to win. In the present day, Drizella is attacked by the neighborhood "Candy Killer". Facilier offers her a way to escape to her home realm, though it would be at the expense of Anastasia's life. Initially, Drizella lures Anastasia in under the guise of wanting to rekindle their sisterhood and brings her to Facilier to perform the ritual. When Anastasia unexpectedly awakens and is forced to choose between Drizella or Gothel, she ultimately chooses her sister. The two leave Hyperion Heights and return to the New Enchanted Forest to start anew. Meanwhile, Lucy organizes a boys' night out for Henry, Rogers, and Nick, which ends with the revelation that Nick is the Candy Killer.
149	16	"Breadcrumbs"	Ron Underwood	Jane Espenson & Jerome Schwartz	April 6, 2018	2.15
In a flashback, Henry expresses his desire to find his own story, as he feels unworthy of Ella. When he mentions to Hook that he wants to propose with a special ring like his grandparents', Hook suggests that they retrieve one from Davy Jones' locker and the two sneak aboard the Jolly Roger to overtake it from Blackbeard. However, it is revealed that it was all a set-up by Hook so that Henry could feel like he partook in an epic adventure. A little while later, Henry ends up proposing to Ella anyway. In the present day, Henry lands a job interview in New York, but before he can leave, Weaver finds his novel at the crime scene and insists that he help the police identify the Candy Killer, whom they conclude is a man who believes he is the "Hansel" of the story. When Henry gets a flat tire driving to the airport, Nick offers him a ride, which ends with Henry getting kidnapped by Nick, who confirms the former's suspicions of him being Hansel and the Candy Killer. Zelena finds herself to be the killer's next target.
150	17	"Chosen"	Lana Parrilla	Paul Karp & Brian Ridings	April 13, 2018	2.18
In a flashback, a Blind Witch, who is in possession of Hansel and Gretel, has settled in Oz, to Zelena's disdain. After Zelena refuses to help the kids, she is magically weakened by the witch and faints in the forest. She is taken in by a blind man named Ivo, who happens to be Hansel and Gretel's father. When Zelena decides to go back for the children, she finds that they have already escaped and told their father about their encounter with her. When the family refuses to give her a second chance, Zelena angrily burns Hansel. In the present day, Jack tells Henry everything about their fairytale past, but Henry still refuses to believe. Jack kidnaps Chad to lure in Zelena so he can get his revenge, though he is rendered unconscious by Zelena. Zelena ends up having to tell Chad her real name and hints at her wicked past, though he recommits his engagement to Zelena and the two decide to move back to San Francisco together. Meanwhile, Facilier uses Naveen, who is actually not cursed, to get magic for a voodoo doll that he uses to kill a detained Jack.
151	18	"The Guardian"	Geofrey Hildrew	David H. Goodman & Brigitte Hales	April 20, 2018	2.12
In the past, Mr. Gold, still dealing with the loss of Belle, is challenged by Facilier to rid himself of the Dagger by seeking out the Guardian. When Gold finds Alice and believes her to be the person he seeks, he tests out the theory on Facilier by pulling his heart out, but Rumple has a change of heart, withholding his transfer of power to Alice so she can be happy with Robin, not dealing with the burden he carries. In the present, Nick’s death has Weaver suspecting Samdi of stealing the dagger, but Samdi says he had no involvement with taking it. Weaver betrays Roni by using the magic needed to save Henry in order to track down the dagger, which leads to Tilly, whose first date with Margot is distracted by the voices from the dagger itself. Henry discovers that Nick was telling him the truth about the blood test results that confirmed him as Lucy’s father and shares the results with a stunned Jacinda.
152	19	"Flower Child"	Tessa Blake	Edward Kitsis & Adam Horowitz	April 27, 2018	1.98
In a flashback, young tree nymph Gothel yearns for interaction with humans. Though warned against it by her nymph family, she explores a house and meets a group of ladies who appear accepting of her magic and invite her to a ball. It turns out that the girls only sought to humiliate her, stealing her key to enter the nymphs' grove and destroy everything and everyone in it. Avenging the death of her kind, Gothel goes on a destructive rampage and turned her home realm into what is later known as the Land Without Magic. In the present day, Gothel tells Tilly that she is her mother and Tilly goes to Rogers with this information. The two of them go to Henry, who has already begun to seriously consider that the stories in his book are real. Lucy and Facilier successfully cure Henry of his pre-curse ailments, but when Henry and Jacinda kiss, the curse doesn't break. Meanwhile, Rogers and Tilly's stakeout on Eloise ends with Tilly being blackmailed into becoming the final member of Gothel's revived coven. The sisterhood then releases their magic back into the land.
153	20	"Is This Henry Mills?"	Ron Underwood	Dana Horgan & Leah Fong	May 4, 2018	1.98
In flashbacks to Henry's senior year of high school, Henry ponders over his next step and tells Regina that he wants to explore colleges outside of Storybrooke. He ends up being accepted to every college he applied to, but having to lie about his life experiences has him doubting about leaving town. In the present day, Regina and Lucy try to thwart Gothel's plot to wipe out mankind. After multiple failed attempts to wake Henry, Regina reveals that the curse took them back in time. When a disbelieving Henry decides to call a phone number listed on his adoption papers, a young Henry picks up on the other line. It is revealed that the curse took them back to the same time period shown in the flashbacks; it is currently Henry's graduation night. The adult Henry gives his younger self some advice, which gives him the push he needs to be okay with leaving home. When Henry finds Regina hurt by Gothel, he gives her true love's kiss, which breaks the curse over the entire neighborhood. Alice finds the strength to defeat Gothel, with her father and Robin by her side. Rumple pays a visit to Facilier's office and their standoff halts when his Wish Realm counterpart suddenly appears and kills Facilier.
154	21	"Homecoming"	Steve Pearlman	David H. Goodman	May 11, 2018	2.26
Celebrations over the breaking of the curse are cut short when Wish Realm Rumplestiltskin sends Jacinda and Lucy to the Wish Realm and attempts to blackmail Henry into obtaining the Dark One's dagger for him. Henry, Regina, Rumple, and Rogers travel to the Wish Realm to find Jacinda and Lucy. The group is split after crossing through, with Henry and Regina sent to the Dark Castle while Rumple and Rogers are sent to the Wish Realm's version of Rumple's old home. Henry obtains the Wish Realm's version of the Author's pen in the hopes of freeing them, but Wish Rumple reveals that he was after the pen and not the dagger. He then presents it to Wish Henry, who is willing to help him rewrite some stories after losing his mother and grandparents. He ends up erasing the Guardian's powers. Wish Rumple then sends Henry, Rumple, and Rogers into the snowglobe. Regina is left behind, as Wish Henry desires revenge after their last encounter. Meanwhile, Alice senses that her family is in danger, and Tiana helps her and Robin obtain a magic bean after regaining her confidence as queen of her people. Alice and Robin first make a pit stop to find help, driving through the portal into Storybrooke.
155	22	"Leaving Storybrooke"	Ralph Hemecker	Edward Kitsis & Adam Horowitz	May 18, 2018	2.27
Alice and Robin arrive in Storybrooke and enlist the help of the past version of Zelena. In the snowglobe, Rumple reveals to Rogers that his Wish Realm counterpart stripped him of his powers and immortality. Everyone is able to break free when Alice magically delivers Maui's fish hook. Meanwhile, Wish Henry has Regina captured and sets up a duel for them the next day. Wish Rumple then visits Wish Henry and reveals his plan to trap all other characters inside storybooks where they are destined for unhappy endings. When Henry comes to Regina's rescue, he's attacked by black knights, but Snow and David save them both. As Wish Henry and Regina comes face-to-face, the others begin to get dragged into the portals. Rogers grabs Alice to save her, leaving his heart in a dire state. Regina is able to reason with Wish Henry and he forfeits, closing the portals off. Rumple decides to sacrifice himself by removing his own heart and giving it to Rogers, destroying Wish Rumple and the Darkness in the process. He is then reunited with Belle in the afterlife. Regina decides to cast a new curse to unite the entire magical universe within Storybrooke's town limits. Some time later, the citizens elect Regina as the Good Queen of the United Realms.

== Production ==
=== Development ===
In January 2017, while the sixth season was still in production, ABC president Channing Dungey spoke of a possible "reset" of the series' narrative in the event that a seventh season is ordered. After much speculation, executive producers Adam Horowitz and Edward Kitsis later confirmed that certain characters would have their storylines wrapped up and that the back-end of the sixth season had been written with the narrative change in mind. Despite the major change, the showrunners have said that they do not view season seven as a complete reboot of the show. Horowitz said: "I hesitate to use the word 'reboot'. We're more thinking about it as a hybrid of a lot of things. We're paying homage to the original premise, but there are certain characters who are returning and some who are not. It's a combination of a lot of things, but what we're trying to do is go in a new direction but stay true to the spirit of what the show has always been."

In July 2017, the showrunners announced that the season would be set in the fictitious Seattle neighborhood of Hyperion Heights, which was created under a new curse. Residents of this neighborhood included displaced characters from the original and new versions of the Enchanted Forest, as well as regular people from the Land Without Magic. This differs from Storybrooke in the first six seasons, which was an isolated town that was blocked off from real-world Maine. The initial villain is Lady Tremaine, who assumes the role of an urban developer who seeks to "gentrify the neighborhood" and push out and separate fairytale residents. Meanwhile, Storybrooke and various Fairy Tale Land locations still appear in the flashbacks of the season as the story bounces back and forth between the characters' lives before and during the latest curse.

The main flashback setting of the seventh season is the New Enchanted Forest, which is a New Fairy Tale Land realm. Other locations featured in flashbacks are the Edge of Realms, the Wish Realm, the New Wonderland, Oz, and Storybrooke. In February 2018, ABC announced that the series would end after this season.

=== Casting ===
In May 2017, it was announced that Lana Parrilla, Colin O'Donoghue, and Robert Carlyle would be the only series regulars from season 6 to continue onto season 7. The character of Henry would also return, but as a man in his late 20s-early 30s portrayed by Andrew J. West. It was teased that the four would be portraying their original characters but with cursed identities, similar to the circumstances in season 1. In July, the first promo of the season revealed that Killian is now a Seattle police officer with the last name Rogers, who is living with an unexplained sense of loss. In August, it was revealed that Regina is now a bar owner named Roni, who is more dressed down and is "no longer in charge."

Former main cast member Jennifer Morrison has confirmed that she has agreed to return for at least one episode, first appearing in the second episode of the season. Morrison announced her last filming day for the episode on July 19, 2017. On July 22, it was confirmed that Emilie de Ravin would return for the fourth episode of the season.

In March 2017, Andrew J. West and Alison Fernandez were cast for unknown guest roles in the season 6 finale. During the episode, it was revealed that West was portraying an adult Henry Mills, while Fernandez portrayed his daughter, Lucy. After that episode's airing, they were confirmed as series regulars for season 7. West took over the role from Jared S. Gilmore, who has been confirmed to appear in at least the first two episodes of the season.

On July 6, 2017, it was announced that Dania Ramirez and Gabrielle Anwar would be two additional series regulars for season 7. Additionally, Adelaide Kane, Mekia Cox, and Rose Reynolds were cast in recurring roles for the season. On July 15, it was announced that Ramirez would be portraying Cinderella, albeit a different version from the one previously played by Jessy Schram for the first six seasons. On July 22 at San Diego Comic-Con, it was revealed that Anwar and Kane will be portraying Lady Tremaine and Drizella, respectively. Cox would be portraying Tiana from The Princess and the Frog, while Reynolds would be playing an alternate version of Alice, a character previously featured in the spin-off Once Upon a Time in Wonderland. In August 2017, Cox was promoted to series regular status.

On August 1, it was announced that Giles Matthey would return as an adult Gideon for the season's fourth episode. The episode, also featuring de Ravin, would be centered around Rumple. On that same day, it was also announced that Emma Booth was cast in a major recurring role as the Witch, whose more specific identity would be revealed later on during the season. On August 25, Kevin Ryan announced that he would be making an appearance as a new prince in the upcoming season. On August 30, it was announced that Robin Givens had been cast as Tiana's mother, Eudora.

On September 8, it was announced that Meegan Warner would be guest starring as an alternate version of Rapunzel, a character previously featured in the season 3 episode "The Tower". It was later revealed that the character would appear in a multi-episode arc. On September 20, it was announced that former regular Rebecca Mader would return for multiple episodes in the seventh season as Zelena, who would also have a cursed identity.

On October 2, it was announced that Dr. Facilier from The Princess and the Frog would make an appearance during the season, later revealed to be portrayed by Daniel Francis in the season's fifth episode. On October 3, it was announced that flashbacks of the ninth episode would feature a "tweenage" Anastasia, Lady Tremaine's other biological daughter.

On November 1, it was announced that Tiera Skovbye would be recurring as an older version of Robin, the daughter of Zelena and Robin Hood. On November 2, it was announced that Nathan Parsons had been cast in a recurring role as Nick, a lawyer and potential love interest for another character. On November 3, it was announced that the show was casting for the role of Naveen from The Princess and the Frog, who will be recurring in the second half of the season. It was later revealed that the role would be played by Jeff Pierre, who first appeared in the twelfth episode of the season. On November 16, actor Chad Rook announced that he had been cast in an unknown role, later revealed to be Captain Ahab in the thirteenth episode.

On January 23, 2018, it was announced that Kip Pardue had been cast as Chad, Zelena's fiancé from when she was cursed as Kelly. He made his appearance in the seventeenth episode of the season.

On March 16, it was announced that multiple former cast members were set to appear in one or both of the season's (and series') last two episodes. This includes former regulars Gilmore (who had also been confirmed to appear in the twentieth episode) and Sean Maguire, as well as formerly recurring stars JoAnna Garcia Swisher, Victoria Smurfit, Robbie Kay, Beverley Elliott, Lee Arenberg, Keegan Connor Tracy and Tony Amendola. On March 21, it was announced that Morrison and de Ravin would be back for a second time, along with Ginnifer Goodwin and Josh Dallas for the final episode of the series. In addition, Raphael Sbarge, David Paul Grove, and Faustino Di Bauda confirmed that they would also appear in the finale.

== Ratings ==
Viewership and ratings per episode of Once Upon a Time season 7
No.	Title	Air date	Rating/share (18–49)	Viewers (millions)	DVR (18–49)	DVR viewers (millions)	Total (18–49)	Total viewers (millions)
1	"Hyperion Heights"	October 6, 2017	0.7/3	3.26	0.7	1.72	1.4	4.98
2	"A Pirate's Life"	October 13, 2017	0.7/3	2.74	0.6	—N/a	1.3	—N/a
3	"The Garden of Forking Paths"	October 20, 2017	0.5/3	2.49	0.6	—N/a	1.1	—N/a
4	"Beauty"	October 27, 2017	0.5/2	2.44	0.5	—N/a	1.0	—N/a
5	"Greenbacks"	November 3, 2017	0.5/2	2.29	0.5	1.27	1.0	3.56
6	"Wake Up Call"	November 10, 2017	0.5/2	2.37	0.5	1.32	1.0	3.69
7	"Eloise Gardener"	November 17, 2017	0.5/2	2.28	0.5	1.30	1.0	3.58
8	"Pretty in Blue"	November 17, 2017	0.5/2	2.28	0.5	1.30	1.0	3.58
9	"One Little Tear"	December 8, 2017	0.5/2	2.45	0.4	—N/a	0.9	—N/a
10	"The Eighth Witch"	December 15, 2017	0.5/2	2.29	—N/a	—N/a	—N/a	—N/a
11	"Secret Garden"	March 2, 2018	0.4/2	2.14	0.5	—N/a	0.9	—N/a
12	"A Taste of the Heights"	March 9, 2018	0.5/2	2.22	0.4	—N/a	0.9	—N/a
13	"Knightfall"	March 16, 2018	0.5/2	2.38	0.4	—N/a	0.9	—N/a
14	"The Girl in the Tower"	March 23, 2018	0.4/2	2.11	0.5	—N/a	0.9	—N/a
15	"Sisterhood"	March 30, 2018	0.5/2	2.03	—N/a	—N/a	—N/a	—N/a
16	"Breadcrumbs"	April 6, 2018	0.5/2	2.15	0.4	—N/a	0.9	—N/a
17	"Chosen"	April 13, 2018	0.4/2	2.18	0.4	—N/a	0.8	—N/a
18	"The Guardian"	April 20, 2018	0.4/2	2.12	0.4	—N/a	0.8	—N/a
19	"Flower Child"	April 27, 2018	0.5/2	1.98	—N/a	—N/a	—N/a	—N/a
20	"Is This Henry Mills?"	May 4, 2018	0.4/2	1.98	—N/a	—N/a	—N/a	—N/a
21	"Homecoming"	May 11, 2018	0.5/3	2.26	—N/a	—N/a	—N/a	—N/a
22	"Leaving Storybrooke"	May 18, 2018	0.5/3	2.27	0.3	0.89	0.8	3.16
