= One Little Tear =

- Once Upon a Time episode
- Episode no.: Season 7 Episode 9
- Directed by: Steve Pearlman
- Written by: Christopher Hollier; Adam Karp

Guest appearances
- Meegan Warner as Young Rapunzel; Adelaide Kane as Drizella/Ivy; Emma Booth as Eloise Gardener/Gothel; Nathan Parsons as Jack/Nick Branson; Matty Finochio as Marcus; Cindy Luna as Cecelia; Yael Yurman as Teen Anastasia; Anna Cathcart as Teen Drizella; Lula Mae Melenchuk as Young Drizella; Alejandra Pérez as Teen Cinderella; Sophia Reid-Gantzert as Young Anastasia

Episode chronology
← Previous "Pretty in Blue"	Next → "The Eighth Witch"
- Once Upon a Time season 7

"One Little Tear" is the ninth episode of the seventh season and the 142nd episode overall of the American fantasy-drama series Once Upon a Time. Written by Christopher Hollier & Adam Karp and directed by Steve Pearlman, it premiered on ABC in the United States on December 8, 2017.

In the episode, the origins of Rapunzel and her connection to Anastasia is revealed, in a backstory that ties in Victoria's scheme to bait Lucy into bringing Anastasia back to life.

== Plot ==
=== Opening sequence ===
Flying lanterns are featured in the background.

=== In the Characters' Past ===
In the New Realm, Rapunzel (a young Lady Tremaine) tries to get radishes from Mother Gothel's garden to save her sick husband and feed their hungry children. Gothel agrees to give her the radishes in exchange for trapping Rapunzel in her tower. After 6 years of captivity, Rapunzel manages to cut off most of her hair and use it as a rope to climb out of the tower. She succeeds in doing so only to find her husband remarried to Cecilia and raising a stepdaughter, Ella.

Gothel reappears and tempts her into making Cecilia flee with a mushroom from New Wonderland. Rapunzel at first disagrees, only to become increasingly jealous of Cecilia's bond with her girls and ends up making her flee to New Wonderland. Her husband chases her, but eventually gives up and comes back to Rapunzel to make a perfect family.

One winter day, while playing outside, both Anastasia and Ella fall through thin ice. Marcus jumps in, however, he ended up only saving Ella and not Anastasia, since he claims he could only save one of them. A distraught Rapunzel brings her daughter to Gothel, who manages to magically preserve Anastasia's last breath at the price of keeping her in the tower, which explains why Anastasia has been in this comatose state. Unknown to Gothel, Rapunzel snatches the potion that sends people to the tower and uses it on Gothel, leaving Gothel trapped in the tower until someone in her bloodline takes her place, which in the future will be baby Alice. Rapunzel vows to her daughter that she will find a way to save her.

=== In Seattle ===
In the present day, Victoria is confronted by Ivy, who wants her mother to give up her plan to revive Anastasia, which falls on Victoria's deaf ears. Victoria later strikes a deal with Weaver to help him find the Guardian in an attempt to free herself from jail and wake Anastasia. During this confrontation, Victoria and Weaver acknowledge each other as Rapunzel and Rumpelstiltskin, respectively.

With Weaver releasing Victoria, a furious Rogers isn't happy about this, so he starts looking into a storage area that Weaver keeps hidden and discovers a treasure trove of information on everything about the residents, including Rogers. Later on with Sabine's help, Rogers discovers that Sabine had once been confronted by Weaver, and that he asked her to clutch a knife. She draws the knife to show Rogers, and it is revealed to be the Dark One's dagger. He catches up with Weaver to demand answers and Weaver tells Rogers that he was doing all this in order to find Belle. Rogers believes him and agreed to help Weaver.

After she is released, Victoria strangely gives full custody of Lucy to Jacinda, claiming to be "a changed person" after jail but used surveillance set up in the apartment to spy on Jacinda and Nick, who later came by to verify the custody papers as authentic, then gave each other a brief and accidental kiss. Victoria then goes on a mission with Weaver to find Henry's original “Once Upon a Time” storybook. They are knowingly tailgated by Ivy and Gothel.

At the hospital, Victoria shows Lucy her family's life story in the book. Using a deceiving ploy to end her beliefs, she convinces Lucy that happy endings aren't real, since Victoria didn't get hers. She also shows Lucy video footage of Jacinda and Nick kissing and tells her that Henry and Roni left town, but lies about Henry giving up on Lucy. All of this shatters Lucy's belief in happy endings, causing her to cry, then run home to Jacinda. Victoria then drops Lucy's tear on Anastasia. Anastasia wakes and is revived, while, at exactly the same time, Lucy collapses at home in Jacinda's arms.

Anastasia recognizes her mother, and they embrace, but are watched from afar by an upset and jealous Ivy and she walks away from her sister's hospital room in tears.

== Reception ==
=== Reviews ===
The episode received mostly positive reviews from critics, with much praise going towards the performances of Anwar and Warner. However, the Rapunzel storyline was criticized for being too weak and rushed.

Paul Dailly of TV Fanatic gave it a 4.2 out of 5 stars.

Entertainment Weekly's Justin Kirkland gave it a B−.
