= Homecoming (Once Upon a Time) =

- Once Upon a Time episode
- Episode no.: Season 7 Episode 21
- Directed by: Steve Pearlman
- Written by: David H. Goodman
- Original air date: May 11, 2018

Guest appearances
- Jared S. Gilmore as Sir Henry (Wish Realm); Robbie Kay as Peter Pan (Wish Realm); Rose Reynolds as Alice/Tilly; Tiera Skovbye as Robin/Margot; Jeff Pierre as Prince Naveen/Drew; Victoria Smurfit as Cruella De Vil (Wish Realm); JoAnna Garcia Swisher as Ariel (Wish Realm); Timothy Webber as the Apprentice (Wish Realm)

Episode chronology
← Previous "Is This Henry Mills?"	Next → "Leaving Storybrooke"
- Once Upon a Time season 7

"Homecoming" is the twenty-first and penultimate episode of the seventh season and the 154th episode overall of the American fantasy-drama series Once Upon a Time. Written by David H. Goodman, and directed by Steve Pearlman, it premiered on ABC in the United States on May 4, 2017.

In the episode, Henry is forced into a deal by the Wish Realm Rumplestiltskin, who is holding Henry's family prisoner, to retrieve the Dagger, but the plan also brings Regina, Hook, and a determined Weaver to the Wish Realm to find a way to stop Rumplestiltskin, not knowing that they are in for a surprise from the trickster. In the past, a younger Henry turns down the Wish Realm Rumplestiltskin's offer to help despite the latter's refusal to take no for an answer.

== Plot ==
=== Opening sequence ===
The "O" in the series' fonts creates a portal. The Seattle scenery is not featured.

=== Event chronology ===
- The past and present Wish Realm events occurs after the events of "Wish You Were Here" and "Tougher Than the Rest".
- The Seattle events occur after "Is This Henry Mills?"

=== In the characters' past ===
During the early days of his travels through the realms, Henry comes to the rescue of a damsel in distress, but another prince arrives to save the day. Despite being disappointed, Henry lets things go, content to keep trying to find his story. The Wish Realm Rumpelstiltskin appears ready to give him a deal, but Henry turns him down, vowing never to make any deals.

=== Present day ===
With the curse destroyed, everyone is celebrating a new beginning. When Henry brings up Facilier to Regina, he started to wonder about him. At another part of town, Hook and Alice have a conversation but from afar. When Regina showed up at Facilier's office, she finds Weaver tied up and released him and warned her about the Wish Realm Rumpelstiltskin.

Speaking of the Alternate Dark One, he surprised Henry at his apartment just as Henry, Ella, and Lucy were celebrating their reunion. When they blew out the candles on the cupcakes, Henry discovers Ella and Lucy gone. Rumpelstiltskin sent them away and is using them as bargaining chips by forcing Henry into attaining The Dagger, despite Henry's refusal to make deals. Henry later informed Regina, Hook, and Weaver about what happened. So the foursome, with the use of Hook's magic hook, create a portal that brings them to the Wish Realm.

=== In the Wish Realm ===
When Henry, Regina, Hook, and Weaver enter the Wish Realm, the portal splits the quartet up. Henry and Regina end up in Rumpelstiltskin's castle and run into his father Peter Pan, who is being held in a pillory and warns the two about Rumpelstiltskin. They also run into another prisoner, a Wish Realm version of Cruella De Vil. After dealing with her, the two find Ella and Lucy trapped in a snow globe and discover that The Dark Rumpelstiltskin is the only one who can release them but because Henry brought along others he fills the snow globe with real snow and increases the temperatures to freeze them.

In the forest, Weaver and Hook end up at the home of the original Rumpelstiltskin before he became a Dark One. Weaver believes it was there to torture his past. The two arrive at a cavernous location and encounter the Wish Realm Ariel, who is ready to bring them to the Castle.

When Weaver rejoins Henry and Regina at the castle, Weaver and Regina suggest that Henry stay and help save his family despite Henry being reluctant. Weaver then returns to the farm and confronts the alter ego, but this time he is ready by tricking him by giving him the Dagger. As the Wish Realm Rumpelstiltskin takes possession, he is frozen by squid ink and Weaver is about to kill him. Regina interrupts his attempt, allowing the Wish Realm Rumpelstiltskin to free himself of the ink, then reminds Weaver of the previous encounter with the Seer, who told him that Henry would be his undoing, as he wanted to use Henry for different reasons altogether.

Henry finds a quill and finds a way to use it, but knocks Hook out. He seeks out the Wish Realm Apprentice, who is now blind. He reminds Henry of the responsibility that came with being the Author, and the quill appears in his hand. When Henry returns to the castle, he uses the quill to suck the ink out of Cruella, but before he can write in the book, the Wish Realm Rumpelstiltskin takes the quill and book away from him and surprises Henry with a new ally: Sir Henry from the Wish Realm, who unlike his counterpart did make a deal with the Alternate Dark One. It appears that the Wish Realm Rumpelstiltskin wants Sir Henry to use the ink and the book to rewrite the story to give the Wish Realm Rumpelstiltskin the power he craves, and to keep the Guardian from taking possession of the Dagger. With the stroke of a pen, and despite pleas from the Adult Henry that what he is doing is making a serious mistake, Sir Henry alters the course in the book and made Adult Henry, Hook, and Weaver disappear, joining Ella and Lucy as prisoners inside the snow globe. Regina is spared because Sir Henry got something in exchange for the deal, which is to seek revenge on Regina for killing his grandparents during the previous encounter when Regina rescued Emma from the Wish Realm (still thinking "his mother" is being kept from him by Regina).

=== In Seattle ===
In between the events, Tiana is trying to adjust to being Sabine while remembering her previous life as a queen, but Naveen assures her that she still has a responsibility to do what is right for her people in this realm. At Roni's, Tilly begins to feel pain and senses something is wrong, and she tells Margot that they should help the others in the Wish Realm. They turn to Sabine for advice, who gathers the residents by the food truck to find something that will guide Margot and Tilly to the Wish Realm. After a little hesitation and Naveen getting their attention, a resident came forward and gives them a magic bean that he had harvested, which Tilly and Margot use to create a portal. Sabine decides to stay behind and guide the neighborhood's residents. As they entered the portal in the food truck, Margot tells Tilly that she knows where to find help, which is in Storybrooke.

== Production notes ==
Archival footage of previous episodes were used in the episode, which featured an uncredited Shannon Lucio as The Seer.

=== Deleted scenes ===
There is a scene by the statue of Queen Snow and King David, where Regina is robbed by Wish Grumpy, Wish Blue Fairy and Wish Granny who have fallen on tough times. It was cut for time, because it was the only scene that could be cut without disrupting the whole flow. However, the scene can still be seen in promotional pictures. This scene is included on the Blu-ray release of the seventh season.

== Reception ==
=== Reviews ===
TV Fanatic gave the episode a 4.0 out of 5 stars.

Entertainment Weekly's Justin Kirkland gave the episode no ratings.
