= Wake Up Call (Once Upon a Time) =

- Once Upon a Time episode
- Episode no.: Season 7 Episode 6
- Directed by: Sharat Raju
- Written by: Jerome Schwartz; Jane Espenson

Guest appearances
- *Adelaide Kane as Drizella * Tremaine/Ivy Belfrey; Emma Booth as Witch/Gothel; Rose Reynolds as Alice/Tilly; Julian Haig as Prince Gregor; Sandy Robson as Sam Ochotta

Episode chronology
← Previous "Greenbacks"	Next → "Eloise Gardener"
- Once Upon a Time season 7

"Wake Up Call" is the sixth episode of the seventh season and the 139th episode overall of the American fantasy-drama series Once Upon a Time. Written by Jerome Schwartz and Jane Espenson and directed by Sharat Raju, it premiered on ABC in the United States on November 10, 2017.

In the episode, Roni and Henry are suddenly discovering that they have a past as mother and son, while in the New Enchanted Forest's past Regina, feeling like a third wheel in Henry and Cinderella's sudden relationship, is lured into a scheme by a determined Drizella, which could have consequences in the present day.

== Plot ==
=== Opening sequence ===
A Tower is featured in the background.

=== In the Characters' Past ===
As Henry and Cinderella take off into the forest, the two are met by thieves who want the motorcycle, but suddenly Regina appears and ready to help, only to have Henry telling her that he and Cinderella are handling them fine. Later on, Regina takes a stroll in the woods when she sees a hooded figure attacked by sentient vines. She saves her, only to discover that the hooded figure is Drizella, who is on a mission to steal magic. Regina starts training Drizella but after a series of failures, Drizella's talents finally come through when she rescues Regina from a falling tower by smashing the concrete in mid-air using magic.

Rumpelstiltskin appears suddenly, and catches up with Regina, telling him of the wonderful life with Belle. He reminds Regina that, just as the Regina's mother Cora was practically omniscient, so too must be Lady Tremaine. Heeding those words, Regina eavesdrops on Tremaine through a magic mirror and discovers that she plans to take Drizella's heart and place it in Anastasia after failing to get Henry's heart, leading Regina to suspect that Drizella plans to kill her mother. Drizella wants Regina to help her but Regina refuses, not wanting her to embrace darkness. When Prince Gregor shows up ready to kill Tremaine, Regina appears and attempts to intervene. It turns out that it was a double-cross set up by Drizella, to lure Gregor into a trap. Drizella uses magic to impale Gregor with black vines, and as a result her heart turns dark, successfully making her heart unsuitable for Tremaine's plan. She tells Regina she will cast a dark curse just like Regina had, to cause her mother pain, only this time, the curse will be unbreakable.

Later on, Regina and Henry spend time together to bond and patch over differences, with Regina saying to him that being his mother will always be her primary role.

=== In Seattle ===
At Roni's, the photo of Henry and Regina becomes the subject of speculation. Lucy runs into the bar to see the photo, and as she looks at it, she identifies Roni as Regina, Henry's mother. She vows to find a way to prove it. Roni contacts Weaver to get information about the adoption in return for a favor. Weaver comes through and gives Roni papers containing information, and Roni, by writing on a bar napkin, discovers that the handwritten signature at the bottom matches her own handwriting.

However, Ivy and the witch already have been planning to use Roni by way of the photo, utilizing the lavender flowers from the garden to create a potion (earlier on, Victoria is learning that the flower is giving her headaches). Ivy later visits Roni to have a talk about the photo and the adoption, but as they are about to have a drink, Ivy slips the potion made by the witch into Roni's drink, and as Roni drinks, she "wakes up" and her real memories of being Regina are returned. Drizella informs Regina that it was her tutelage that gave her the ability to cast the new curse, and therefore it will be difficult to break because if Henry and Jacinda experience true love's kiss everyone will be in jeopardy, reminding her of a special contingency that was put into the curse that would hurt Henry if she didn't comply. Regina cries in her bar, then goes to meet Henry at the park. When she asks him what he remembers about his mother, he reveals that he was born in prison to an unknown mother and grew up in the system (as these are his cursed memories). She yearns to tell him who she really is, but refrains from doing so.

In between the events, Jacinda is upset with Henry about Instagram photos from Halloween night that were schemingly posted by Ivy. But after being encouraged by Roni to pursue Jacinda, Henry shows up at the food truck with a large radio and convince Jacinda to forgive him, and to ask her out on a date, and offered to help her start the engine on the vehicle.

Meanwhile, as Weaver checks out of the hospital, Rogers suspects Tilly and Weaver are holding something back after he talked to Tilly, who then told Rogers about Eloise, explaining in riddles that the information from the sketch book is somehow closer than he thought. However, someone else has already beaten Rogers to the punch; the suspect with the tattooed hand is found murdered at his home.

== Production ==
A scene between Drizella and Regina, where a flower was involved, was cut from the final episode.

== Casting ==
- Mekia Cox was credited in this episode, but does not appear.
- The flashbacks featured in the episode were from previous seasons' episodes.
- Julian Haig and Sandy Robson appears in major co-starring roles. Haig's appearance was announced via his Instagram on September 14, 2017, while Robson reprises his role from Greenbacks.

== Reception ==
=== Reviews ===
The episode received positive reviews from critics. Praise went to Sharat Raju's directing, the performances of Lana Parrilla and Adelaide Kane, and the plot with many reviewers saying that it was a worthwhile story.

Paul Dailly of TV Fanatic gave it a 4.5 out of 5 stars: "Wake Up Call" was an excellent episode of this ABC drama series. The storyline is not moving along at a brisk pace, and it's becoming clear that the reboot was worth it"

Entertainment Weekly's Justin Kirkland gave it a B−
