= Chosen (Once Upon a Time) =

- Once Upon a Time episode
- Episode no.: Season 7 Episode 17
- Directed by: Lana Parrilla
- Written by: Paul Karp; Brian Ridings
- Original air date: April 13, 2018

Guest appearances
- Nathan Parsons as Nick Branson; Rebecca Mader as Zelena/Kelly West; Daniel Francis as Mr. Samdi; Tiera Skovbye as Margot; Jeff Pierre as Drew; Kip Pardue as Chad; Chilton Crane as Hilda Braeburn/Blind Witch; Seth Isaac Johnson as Young Hansel; Lily van der Griend as Young Gretel; Dan Payne as Ivo

Episode chronology
← Previous "Breadcrumbs"	Next → "The Guardian"
- Once Upon a Time season 7

"Chosen" is the seventeenth episode of the seventh season and the 150th episode overall of the American fantasy-drama series Once Upon a Time. Written by Paul Karp and Brian Ridings, and directed by series regular Lana Parrilla (in her directorial debut), it premiered on ABC in the United States on April 13, 2018.

In the episode, Zelena is drawn into a trap by Nick as he uses a non-believable Henry as part of his plan to kill her, which also draws Samdi's attention as he continues to bait Sabine, while in the past Hansel and Gretel's encounter with Zelena is revealed.

== Plot ==
=== Opening sequence ===
A gingerbread house is featured in the background.

=== In the Characters' Past ===
In the Land of Oz before the original curse, Zelena comes across a gingerbread house and finds Hansel and Gretel, but the occupant and her archenemy the Gingerbread witch is ready to stop her as payback for trying to banish her from Oz because Zelena saw her as a threat. The Gingerbread Witch uses her power to defeat Zelena and weaken her adversary, leaving her to pass out in the forest. She is later awoken in a cabin by a blind woodcutter named Ivo, who wants to help her regain her health. When he told her about Hansel and Gretel, Zelena realized that Ivo was their father. Sensing that she has found a kind personality in Ivo, Zelena repays Ivo by saving his children and hopefully restore Ivo's eyesight.

When Zelena returns to save Hansel and Gretel, she succeed in defeating the Gingerbread Witch by taking her sight but Hansel and Gretel had already escaped. Unfortunately when she returned Ivo was ready and waiting, as Hansel and Gretel told their father about Zelena. Ivo asked her to leave but she suddenly went furious by throwing the ring containing the witch's sight into the fireplace. Hansel tries to fight against Zelena, who responded by using flames from the fireplace to give Hansel the scars on his arms. As Zelena disappears, Hansel's hatred towards witches begins.

=== In The Present Day ===
In Seattle, Zelena is trying to grapple with dealing with a situation about the Candy Killer, as well as how to deal with how to explain the truth to her fiancé Chad. This made Zelena more concerned as she confronted Weaver at the police station asking for help rather than asking Rogers. While Weaver couldn't do anything at this point, he did give Zelena her green necklace back as a reminder of how to defeat Hansel.

As for the now-awake Hansel, he is still holding Henry hostage and is doing everything to convince him that Regina and Zelena are his adoptive mother and aunt, and even showed him the test results that Lucy is Henry's daughter, despite Henry still in a cursed situation as he doesn't believe anything that "Nick" is telling him. Hansel wants Henry to help him kill Zelena but refused, and "Nick" isn't taking no for an answer by knocking Henry out and taking matters into his own hands.

Nick is also using Henry's phone to make it look like Henry is doing great while doing the job interview in New York City, and even Jacinda is believing this by reading the texts, but Rogers discovers that Henry's car was found abandoned and never caught his flight, so when he informed Jacinda about this he asked to see the texts and discovers that Nick had used his own words to describe Jacinda that gave it away. Rogers finds Henry and the two race to stop Hansel. Henry is later reunited with Jacinda and Lucy, telling them and Sabine he's staying in Seattle for them.

Later that evening, Zelena became startled by Regina, who wants to help her sister deal with Hansel but hours later Roni's receives a phone call from Chad. As Zelena answers the call, her excitement turns to shock as she discovers that Hansel is holding Chad hostage demanding a showdown. Zelena tells Regina that she'll handle it on her own. When she found Chad's location, Hansel explains to Chad the truth about Zelena, and a fight ensued with Zelena defeating Hansel by knocking him out instead of killing him. Chad finally learned the truth about Zelena after believing her to be Kelly. However, Chad isn't concerned about what or who Zelena is, just as long as he loves her for what she is. In the end, Zelena agreed to help Regina, but Regina wants Zelena to be with Chad for now. Zelena also said goodbye to Margot and promised to reveal everything soon, and then gives Margot her necklace to wear as her Maid of Honor at her and Chad's upcoming wedding.

In between the events, Drew is helping Sabine out with selling her beignets, but after she leaves to buy more supplies, Drew is visited by Samdi, as it is revealed that Drew is awake and remembers his life as Naveen and made him aware of his debt to him. Later that evening Naveen brings the beignet to Samdi and used magic from the ingredients on a voodoo doll. Hours later at the jail, Hansel received an unexpected visitor, as Samdi stopped by revealing that he was responsible for waking him up from the curse, but for a certain reason, which is to kill Mother Gothel. Seeing Hansel as competition and calling him a wild card, Samdi used the cursed voodoo doll to tell Hansel that he's "taking him out of the deck," then sticks a pin into the doll to give Hansel a heart attack, which kills him instantly.

== Reception ==
=== Reviews ===
The episode received positive reviews, mostly due to Parrilla's directorial debut and the improvement in the storylines.

TV Fanatic gave the episode a 4.2 out of 5 stars.

Entertainment Weekly's Justin Kirkland had no rating given for the episode.
