= Is This Henry Mills? =

- Once Upon a Time episode
- Note: Although this photo was included in the press kit issued by ABC for this episode, the scene depicted in this photo was cut.
- Episode no.: Season 7 Episode 20
- Directed by: Ron Underwood
- Written by: Dana Horgan; Leah Fong
- Original air date: May 4, 2018

Guest appearances
- Jared S. Gilmore as Young Henry; Emma Booth as Eloise Gardener; Rose Reynolds as Alice/Tilly; Daniel Francis as Facilier/Mr. Samdi; Tiera Skovbye as Robin/Margot; Jeff Pierre as Prince Naveen/Drew; Beverley Elliott as Granny; Bruce Blain as Desk Sergeant

Episode chronology
← Previous "Flower Child"	Next → "Homecoming"
- Once Upon a Time season 7

"Is This Henry Mills?" is the twentieth episode of the seventh season and the 153rd episode overall of the American fantasy-drama series Once Upon a Time. Written by Dana Horgan & Leah Fong, and directed by Ron Underwood, it premiered on ABC in the United States on May 4, 2018.

In the episode, Henry's future and that of the residents of Hyperion Heights rests on finding the spell that will change everything as Gothel prepares to unleash a new wrath on the Land Without Magic, while Facilier's plan to use Sabine and Weaver are sidetracked by unforeseen circumstances. In the past, Henry faces a tough decision as he prepares to graduate from high school.

== Plot ==
=== Opening sequence ===
Regina's car is featured in the forest.

=== Event chronology ===
- The Storybrooke events occur after “The Final Battle” and "A Pirate's Life" and before the opening scene of “Hyperion Heights” .
- The Seattle events occur after “Flower Child”.

=== In the characters' past (the present day) ===
In Storybrooke, Regina has Henry line up against a wall to measure his growth. As he leaves for school, Regina gives him her car. However, he isn't sure about colleges at this point. Later on, Regina surprises Henry with a bunch of brochures from universities for him to consider. Weeks later, Regina discovers that Henry was accepted to every university, but Henry continues to have doubts about his future and isn't sure about what he wants.

The flashback reveals a twist in the story: as Henry goes upstairs to try on his cap and gown, he gets a surprise phone call. When Henry answers it, it is the adult Henry on the other end. Adult Henry says he's a friend of young Henry's mother, and they have a brief conversation. Before ending the call, the adult Henry tells the young Henry where to find the box that was behind the dresser. When Henry does, it reveals a magic bean, which Henry will use on the day he leaves Storybrooke.

Later that night, Henry finally tells Regina that he is ready to make a choice but will tell her the following morning. The final moments have Henry writing his book called "Once Upon a Time" and narrates the opening tales about him and his family.

=== In the Present Day ===
A dark storm cloud circulates around Seattle, and Lucy tells Regina that Facilier saved Henry from the curse, but it failed to ignite True Love's Kiss between him and Jacinda. The two are startled by Gothel, who offers Regina a chance to join her Coven and save her family as she tells them that Henry has lost his powers in believing. Regina turns her down. Later on, Weaver makes amends with Regina by offering a special potion to help Regina save Henry. He tells Regina he's doing this because of Belle. But when she gives Henry the potion at his apartment, it doesn't work. Regina and Lucy decide to use another approach, by using the "Once Upon a Time" book, but that doesn't work either. At this point, Henry still doesn't believe and wants Regina and Lucy to stop this nonsense. After Lucy leaves, an upset Regina keeps trying to make Henry believe. When he asks where are the heroes in the book such as Snow, Charming, and Emma, Regina reveals that the curse Gothel created sent everyone back in time and that their past selves have yet to leave Storybrooke (thus revealing that the Storybrooke flashbacks and the Hyperion Heights action are actually occurring alongside each other). After they return to Henry's apartment, and after Lucy tells him she has given up on him, Henry discovers the adoption papers with a phone number. He calls the number and speaks to his younger self, which causes Henry's memories to come back. Lucy is excited that Henry's back, and they go to rescue Regina.

At the Coven, Rogers watches as one of the witches is transformed into a tree, while the power causes Tilly to fall into a trance. Rogers escapes. When he reaches the police station, Rogers confronts Weaver about Gothel and the witches, and Weaver tells him that everything he witnessed is true and that it will all make sense soon. The two then recruit Margot to help them. When they return, Margot tries to talk Tilly out of it but Tilly uses her magic to push her away, then shrinks Margot, Rogers, and Weaver down in size. They watch as the rest of the witches turn to trees.

Earlier that day at Jacinda's, Lucy and Jacinda are packing for Bainbridge Island when Sabine gives Lucy a backpack that Drew used. When Lucy shows the two a tarot card and tells them about Facilier, the ladies decide to pay a visit to Samdi's office. Arriving there, Facilier shows them a tied-up Drew, then sticks a pin in a doll that caused Sabine pain. The women comply by joining him in the closet.

That night at the garden, Regina tries to stop Gothel, but as Regina doesn't have magic, Gothel gets the upper hand. As Gothel prepares to destroy humanity, Henry and Lucy show up, and as Henry grabs Regina, he kissed her and breaks the Curse, saving humanity. The ending of the curse reunites Henry with Ella, Regina and Lucy, and Alice with a full-sized Weaver, Hook and Robin. The curse not only restores everyone and their magic, but it also gives Alice a chance to choose love over evil. She uses her magic to transform Gothel into a tree, and she places flowers around it.

The curse also wakes up Ella and Tiana, but Facilier escapes before they can stop him. Sabine/Tiana and Drew/Naveen are also reunited. With Weaver's powers restored, the former Mr. Gold attempts to retrieve his and Belle's album book, but it is not in his safe. He then visits Facilier's office and discovers it there. When Facilier walks in, Weaver attempts to use his magic to choke Facilier but stops short of killing him. But then, Facilier is killed in front of Weaver by the Wish Realm Rumpelstiltskin, who wants to become better acquainted with Weaver.

== Production notes ==
Archival footage of previous episodes were used in the episode, and featured an uncredited Jennifer Morrison.

== Reception ==
=== Reviews ===
The episode received critical acclaim. Critics praised the writing, music, and the performances of West, Parrilla, and Gilmore.

TV Fanatic gave the episode a 4.0 out of 5 stars.

Entertainment Weekly's Justin Kirkland gave the episode a A−.
