= List of Once Upon a Time episodes =

Once Upon a Time is an American fairy tale drama television series created by Edward Kitsis and Adam Horowitz, who also serve as executive producers alongside Steve Pearlman. The series begins by introducing a bail bondswoman, Emma Swan (Jennifer Morrison) and her son, Henry Mills (Jared S. Gilmore), who discover that a town named Storybrooke in Maine is a remnant of a parallel fantasy world that was cursed by Henry's adoptive mother, the Evil Queen / Regina Mills (Lana Parrilla), and that all the characters from the fairy tales have no memories of who they were, including Emma's parents, Snow White / Mary Margaret Blanchard (Ginnifer Goodwin) and Prince Charming / David Nolan (Josh Dallas), who sent her to the real world to save their world and break the curse.

During the course of the series, 155 episodes of Once Upon a Time aired over seven seasons, between October 23, 2011, and May 18, 2018.

== Series overview ==
Season	Episodes	Originally released		Viewers (millions)	Viewers rank	18–49 rating/share	18-49 rank
Season	Episodes	First released	Last released	Viewers (millions)	Viewers rank	18–49 rating/share	18-49 rank
1	22	October 23, 2011	May 13, 2012	11.71	28	4.1/10	18
2	22	September 30, 2012	May 12, 2013	10.24	35	3.6/9	18
3	22	September 29, 2013	May 11, 2014	9.38	35	4.2/8	12
4	22	September 28, 2014	May 10, 2015	8.98	50	3.2/7	17
5	23	September 27, 2015	May 15, 2016	6.32	69	2.2	34
6	22	September 25, 2016	May 14, 2017	4.39	105	1.5/5	70
7	22	October 6, 2017	May 18, 2018	3.41	120	0.9	115

== Episodes ==
=== Season 1 (2011–12) ===
No. overall	No. in season	Title	Directed by	Written by	Original release date	US viewers (millions)
1	1	"Pilot"	Mark Mylod	Edward Kitsis & Adam Horowitz	October 23, 2011	12.94
2	2	"The Thing You Love Most"	Greg Beeman	Edward Kitsis & Adam Horowitz	October 30, 2011	11.74
3	3	"Snow Falls"	Dean White	Liz Tigelaar	November 6, 2011	11.45
4	4	"The Price of Gold"	David Solomon	David H. Goodman	November 13, 2011	11.36
5	5	"That Still Small Voice"	Paul Edwards	Jane Espenson	November 27, 2011	10.69
6	6	"The Shepherd"	Victor Nelli	Andrew Chambliss & Ian Goldberg	December 4, 2011	9.66
7	7	"The Heart Is a Lonely Hunter"	David M. Barrett	Edward Kitsis & Adam Horowitz	December 11, 2011	8.92
8	8	"Desperate Souls"	Michael Waxman	Jane Espenson	January 8, 2012	10.35
9	9	"True North"	Dean White	David H. Goodman & Liz Tigelaar	January 15, 2012	9.83
10	10	"7:15 A.M."	Ralph Hemecker	Story by : Edward Kitsis & Adam Horowitz; Teleplay by : Daniel T. Thomsen	January 22, 2012	9.33
11	11	"Fruit of the Poisonous Tree"	Bryan Spicer	Ian Goldberg & Andrew Chambliss	January 29, 2012	10.91
12	12	"Skin Deep"	Milan Cheylov	Jane Espenson	February 12, 2012	8.65
13	13	"What Happened to Frederick"	Dean White	David H. Goodman	February 19, 2012	9.84
14	14	"Dreamy"	David Solomon	Edward Kitsis & Adam Horowitz	March 4, 2012	10.67
15	15	"Red-Handed"	Ron Underwood	Jane Espenson	March 11, 2012	9.29
16	16	"Heart of Darkness"	Dean White	Andrew Chambliss & Ian Goldberg	March 18, 2012	8.69
17	17	"Hat Trick"	Ralph Hemecker	Vladimir Cvetko & David H. Goodman	March 25, 2012	8.82
18	18	"The Stable Boy"	Dean White	Edward Kitsis & Adam Horowitz	April 1, 2012	8.36
19	19	"The Return"	Paul Edwards	Jane Espenson	April 22, 2012	9.08
20	20	"The Stranger"	Gwyneth Horder-Payton	Ian B. Goldberg & Andrew Chambliss	April 29, 2012	9.20
21	21	"An Apple Red as Blood"	Milan Cheylov	Jane Espenson & David H. Goodman	May 6, 2012	8.95
22	22	"A Land Without Magic"	Dean White	Edward Kitsis & Adam Horowitz	May 13, 2012	9.67

=== Season 2 (2012–13) ===
No. overall	No. in season	Title	Directed by	Written by	Original release date	US viewers (millions)
23	1	"Broken"	Ralph Hemecker	Edward Kitsis & Adam Horowitz	September 30, 2012	11.36
24	2	"We Are Both"	Dean White	Jane Espenson	October 7, 2012	9.84
25	3	"Lady of the Lake"	Milan Cheylov	Andrew Chambliss & Ian Goldberg	October 14, 2012	9.45
26	4	"The Crocodile"	David Solomon	David H. Goodman & Robert Hull	October 21, 2012	9.89
27	5	"The Doctor"	Paul Edwards	Edward Kitsis & Adam Horowitz	October 28, 2012	9.85
28	6	"Tallahassee"	David M. Barrett	Christine Boylan & Jane Espenson	November 4, 2012	10.15
29	7	"Child of the Moon"	Anthony Hemingway	Ian Goldberg & Andrew Chambliss	November 11, 2012	8.75
30	8	"Into the Deep"	Ron Underwood	Kalinda Vazquez & Daniel T. Thomsen	November 25, 2012	8.82
31	9	"Queen of Hearts"	Ralph Hemecker	Edward Kitsis & Adam Horowitz	December 2, 2012	9.10
32	10	"The Cricket Game"	Dean White	David H. Goodman & Robert Hull	January 6, 2013	9.10
33	11	"The Outsider"	David Solomon	Andrew Chambliss & Ian Goldberg	January 13, 2013	8.24
34	12	"In the Name of the Brother"	Milan Cheylov	Jane Espenson	January 20, 2013	7.68
35	13	"Tiny"	Guy Ferland	Christine Boylan & Kalinda Vazquez	February 10, 2013	7.08
36	14	"Manhattan"	Dean White	Edward Kitsis & Adam Horowitz	February 17, 2013	7.61
37	15	"The Queen Is Dead"	Gwyneth Horder-Payton	Daniel T. Thomsen & David H. Goodman	March 3, 2013	7.39
38	16	"The Miller's Daughter"	Ralph Hemecker	Jane Espenson	March 10, 2013	7.64
39	17	"Welcome to Storybrooke"	Dave Barrett	Ian Goldberg & Andrew Chambliss	March 17, 2013	7.45
40	18	"Selfless, Brave and True"	Ralph Hemecker	Robert Hull & Kalinda Vazquez	March 24, 2013	7.38
41	19	"Lacey"	Milan Cheylov	Edward Kitsis & Adam Horowitz	April 21, 2013	7.37
42	20	"The Evil Queen"	Gwyneth Horder-Payton	Jane Espenson & Christine Boylan	April 28, 2013	7.16
43	21	"Second Star to the Right"	Ralph Hemecker	Andrew Chambliss & Ian Goldberg	May 5, 2013	7.50
44	22	"And Straight On 'til Morning"	Dean White	Edward Kitsis & Adam Horowitz	May 12, 2013	7.33

=== Season 3 (2013–14) ===
No. overall	No. in season	Title	Directed by	Written by	Original release date	US viewers (millions)
45	1	"The Heart of the Truest Believer"	Ralph Hemecker	Edward Kitsis & Adam Horowitz	September 29, 2013	8.52
46	2	"Lost Girl"	Ron Underwood	Andrew Chambliss & Kalinda Vazquez	October 6, 2013	8.00
47	3	"Quite a Common Fairy"	Alex Zakrzewski	Jane Espenson	October 13, 2013	7.53
48	4	"Nasty Habits"	David Boyd	David H. Goodman & Robert Hull	October 20, 2013	7.05
49	5	"Good Form"	Jon Amiel	Christine Boylan & Daniel T. Thomsen	October 27, 2013	7.23
50	6	"Ariel"	Ciaran Donnelly	Edward Kitsis & Adam Horowitz	November 3, 2013	7.55
51	7	"Dark Hollow"	Guy Ferland	Kalinda Vazquez & Andrew Chambliss	November 10, 2013	6.71
52	8	"Think Lovely Thoughts"	David Solomon	David H. Goodman & Robert Hull	November 17, 2013	6.66
53	9	"Save Henry"	Andy Goddard	Christine Boylan & Daniel T. Thomsen	December 1, 2013	6.64
54	10	"The New Neverland"	Ron Underwood	Andrew Chambliss	December 8, 2013	6.94
55	11	"Going Home"	Ralph Hemecker	Edward Kitsis & Adam Horowitz	December 15, 2013	6.44
56	12	"New York City Serenade"	Billy Gierhart	Edward Kitsis & Adam Horowitz	March 9, 2014	7.66
57	13	"Witch Hunt"	Guy Ferland	Jane Espenson	March 16, 2014	7.75
58	14	"The Tower"	Ralph Hemecker	Robert Hull	March 23, 2014	6.91
59	15	"Quiet Minds"	Eagle Egilsson	Kalinda Vazquez	March 30, 2014	6.64
60	16	"It's Not Easy Being Green"	Mario Van Peebles	Andrew Chambliss	April 6, 2014	7.26
61	17	"The Jolly Roger"	Ernest Dickerson	David H. Goodman	April 13, 2014	6.50
62	18	"Bleeding Through"	Romeo Tirone	Jane Espenson & Daniel T. Thomsen	April 20, 2014	5.95
63	19	"A Curious Thing"	Ralph Hemecker	Edward Kitsis & Adam Horowitz	April 27, 2014	7.34
64	20	"Kansas"	Gwyneth Horder-Payton	Andrew Chambliss & Kalinda Vazquez	May 4, 2014	6.86
65	21	"Snow Drifts"	Ron Underwood	David H. Goodman & Robert Hull	May 11, 2014	6.80
66	22	"There's No Place Like Home"	Ralph Hemecker	Edward Kitsis & Adam Horowitz	May 11, 2014	6.80

=== Season 4 (2014–15) ===
No. overall	No. in season	Title	Directed by	Written by	Original release date	US viewers (millions)
67	1	"A Tale of Two Sisters"	Ralph Hemecker	Edward Kitsis & Adam Horowitz	September 28, 2014	10.20
68	2	"White Out"	Ron Underwood	Jane Espenson	October 5, 2014	9.24
69	3	"Rocky Road"	Morgan Beggs	David H. Goodman & Jerome Schwartz	October 12, 2014	7.92
70	4	"The Apprentice"	Ralph Hemecker	Andrew Chambliss & Dana Horgan	October 19, 2014	8.07
71	5	"Breaking Glass"	Alrick Riley	Kalinda Vazquez & Scott Nimerfro	October 26, 2014	6.87
72	6	"Family Business"	Mario Van Peebles	Kalinda Vazquez & Andrew Chambliss	November 2, 2014	7.54
73	7	"The Snow Queen"	Billy Gierhart	Edward Kitsis & Adam Horowitz	November 9, 2014	7.42
74	8	"Smash the Mirror"	Eagle Egilsson	David H. Goodman & Jerome Schwartz	November 16, 2014	6.80
74	8	"Smash the Mirror"	Ralph Hemecker	David H. Goodman & Jerome Schwartz	November 16, 2014	6.80
75	9	"Fall"	Mario Van Peebles	Jane Espenson	November 30, 2014	6.43
76	10	"Shattered Sight"	Gwyneth Horder-Payton	Scott Nimerfro & Tze Chun	December 7, 2014	6.20
77	11	"Heroes and Villains"	Ralph Hemecker	Edward Kitsis & Adam Horowitz	December 14, 2014	5.69
78	12	"Darkness on the Edge of Town"	Jon Amiel	Edward Kitsis & Adam Horowitz	March 1, 2015	6.66
79	13	"Unforgiven"	Adam Horowitz	Andrew Chambliss & Kalinda Vazquez	March 8, 2015	6.72
80	14	"Enter the Dragon"	Ralph Hemecker	David H. Goodman & Jerome Schwartz	March 15, 2015	5.88
81	15	"Poor Unfortunate Soul"	Steve Pearlman	Andrew Chambliss & Dana Horgan	March 22, 2015	5.79
82	16	"Best Laid Plans"	Ron Underwood	Kalinda Vazquez & Jane Espenson	March 29, 2015	5.48
83	17	"Heart of Gold"	Billy Gierhart	Tze Chun & Scott Nimerfro	April 12, 2015	5.17
84	18	"Sympathy for the De Vil"	Romeo Tirone	David H. Goodman & Jerome Schwartz	April 19, 2015	5.12
85	19	"Lily"	Ralph Hemecker	Andrew Chambliss & Dana Horgan	April 26, 2015	5.21
86	20	"Mother"	Ron Underwood	Jane Espenson	May 3, 2015	5.31
87	21	"Operation Mongoose"	Romeo Tirone	Edward Kitsis & Adam Horowitz	May 10, 2015	5.51
88	22	"Operation Mongoose"	Ralph Hemecker	Edward Kitsis & Adam Horowitz	May 10, 2015	5.51

=== Season 5 (2015–16) ===
No. overall	No. in season	Title	Directed by	Written by	Original release date	US viewers (millions)
89	1	"The Dark Swan"	Ron Underwood	Edward Kitsis & Adam Horowitz	September 27, 2015	5.93
90	2	"The Price"	Romeo Tirone	Andrew Chambliss & Dana Horgan	October 4, 2015	5.38
91	3	"Siege Perilous"	Ralph Hemecker	Jane Espenson	October 11, 2015	5.28
92	4	"The Broken Kingdom"	Alrick Riley	David H. Goodman & Jerome Schwartz	October 18, 2015	4.92
93	5	"Dreamcatcher"	Romeo Tirone	Edward Kitsis & Adam Horowitz	October 25, 2015	5.12
94	6	"The Bear and the Bow"	Ralph Hemecker	Andrew Chambliss & Tze Chun	November 1, 2015	4.83
95	7	"Nimue"	Romeo Tirone	Jane Espenson	November 8, 2015	4.88
96	8	"Birth"	Eagle Egilsson	David H. Goodman & Jerome Schwartz	November 15, 2015	4.85
97	9	"The Bear King"	Geofrey Hildrew	Andrew Chambliss	November 15, 2015	4.85
98	10	"Broken Heart"	Romeo Tirone	Dana Horgan & Tze Chun	November 29, 2015	4.38
99	11	"Swan Song"	Gwyneth Horder-Payton	Edward Kitsis & Adam Horowitz	December 6, 2015	4.56
100	12	"Souls of the Departed"	Ralph Hemecker	Edward Kitsis & Adam Horowitz	March 6, 2016	4.01
101	13	"Labor of Love"	Billy Gierhart	Andrew Chambliss & Dana Horgan	March 13, 2016	4.31
102	14	"Devil's Due"	Alrick Riley	Jane Espenson	March 20, 2016	3.54
103	15	"The Brothers Jones"	Eagle Egilsson	Jerome Schwartz & David H. Goodman	March 27, 2016	3.51
104	16	"Our Decay"	Steve Pearlman	Tze Chun & Dana Horgan	April 3, 2016	3.78
105	17	"Her Handsome Hero"	Romeo Tirone	Jerome Schwartz	April 10, 2016	3.75
106	18	"Ruby Slippers"	Eriq La Salle	Andrew Chambliss & Bill Wolkoff	April 17, 2016	3.76
107	19	"Sisters"	Romeo Tirone	David H. Goodman & Brigitte Hales	April 24, 2016	3.85
108	20	"Firebird"	Ron Underwood	Jane Espenson	May 1, 2016	3.77
109	21	"Last Rites"	Craig Powell	Jerome Schwartz	May 8, 2016	3.75
110	22	"Only You"	Romeo Tirone	David H. Goodman & Andrew Chambliss	May 15, 2016	4.07
111	23	"An Untold Story"	Dean White	Edward Kitsis & Adam Horowitz	May 15, 2016	4.07

=== Season 6 (2016–17) ===
No. overall	No. in season	Title	Directed by	Written by	Original release date	US viewers (millions)
112	1	"The Savior"	Eagle Egilsson	Edward Kitsis & Adam Horowitz	September 25, 2016	3.99
113	2	"A Bitter Draught"	Ron Underwood	Andrew Chambliss & Dana Horgan	October 2, 2016	3.72
114	3	"The Other Shoe"	Steve Pearlman	Jane Espenson & Jerome Schwartz	October 9, 2016	4.11
115	4	"Strange Case"	Alrick Riley	David H. Goodman & Nelson Soler	October 16, 2016	3.53
116	5	"Street Rats"	Norman Buckley	Edward Kitsis & Adam Horowitz	October 23, 2016	3.40
117	6	"Dark Waters"	Robert Duncan	Andrew Chambliss & Brigitte Hales	October 30, 2016	3.06
118	7	"Heartless"	Ralph Hemecker	Jane Espenson	November 6, 2016	3.56
119	8	"I'll Be Your Mirror"	Jennifer Lynch	Jerome Schwartz & Leah Fong	November 13, 2016	3.40
120	9	"Changelings"	Mairzee Almas	David H. Goodman & Brian Ridings	November 27, 2016	3.28
121	10	"Wish You Were Here"	Ron Underwood	Edward Kitsis & Adam Horowitz	December 4, 2016	3.27
122	11	"Tougher Than the Rest"	Billy Gierhart	Edward Kitsis & Adam Horowitz	March 5, 2017	3.03
123	12	"Murder Most Foul"	Morgan Beggs	Jerome Schwartz & Jane Espenson	March 12, 2017	3.06
124	13	"Ill-Boding Patterns"	Ron Underwood	Andrew Chambliss & Dana Horgan	March 19, 2017	2.71
125	14	"Page 23"	Kate Woods	David H. Goodman & Brigitte Hales	March 26, 2017	2.85
126	15	"A Wondrous Place"	Steve Pearlman	Jane Espenson & Jerome Schwartz	April 2, 2017	2.80
127	16	"Mother's Little Helper"	Billy Gierhart	Story by : Edward Kitsis & Adam Horowitz; Teleplay by : Paul Karp	April 9, 2017	2.60
128	17	"Awake"	Sharat Raju	Andrew Chambliss & Leah Fong	April 16, 2017	2.51
129	18	"Where Bluebirds Fly"	Michael Schultz	David H. Goodman & Brigitte Hales	April 23, 2017	2.69
130	19	"The Black Fairy"	Alrick Riley	Jerome Schwartz & Dana Horgan	April 30, 2017	3.05
131	20	"The Song in Your Heart"	Ron Underwood	David H. Goodman & Andrew Chambliss	May 7, 2017	2.87
132	21	"The Final Battle"	Steve Pearlman	Edward Kitsis & Adam Horowitz	May 14, 2017	2.95
133	22	"The Final Battle"	Ralph Hemecker	Edward Kitsis & Adam Horowitz	May 14, 2017	2.95

=== Season 7 (2017–18) ===
No. overall	No. in season	Title	Directed by	Written by	Original release date	US viewers (millions)
134	1	"Hyperion Heights"	Ralph Hemecker	Edward Kitsis & Adam Horowitz	October 6, 2017	3.26
135	2	"A Pirate's Life"	Tara Nicole Weyr	Jane Espenson & Jerome Schwartz	October 13, 2017	2.74
136	3	"The Garden of Forking Paths"	Ron Underwood	David H. Goodman & Brigitte Hales	October 20, 2017	2.49
137	4	"Beauty"	Mick Garris	Dana Horgan & Leah Fong	October 27, 2017	2.44
138	5	"Greenbacks"	Geofrey Hildrew	Christopher Hollier & Adam Karp	November 3, 2017	2.29
139	6	"Wake Up Call"	Sharat Raju	Jerome Schwartz & Jane Espenson	November 10, 2017	2.37
140	7	"Eloise Gardener"	Alex Kalymnios	David H. Goodman & Brigitte Hales	November 17, 2017	2.28
141	8	"Pretty in Blue"	Ralph Hemecker	Dana Horgan & Leah Fong	November 17, 2017	2.28
142	9	"One Little Tear"	Steve Pearlman	Christopher Hollier & Adam Karp	December 8, 2017	2.45
143	10	"The Eighth Witch"	Ralph Hemecker	Jane Espenson & Jerome Schwartz	December 15, 2017	2.29
144	11	"Secret Garden"	Mick Garris	Edward Kitsis & Adam Horowitz	March 2, 2018	2.14
145	12	"A Taste of the Heights"	Nina Lopez-Corrado	David H. Goodman & Brigitte Hales	March 9, 2018	2.22
146	13	"Knightfall"	Steve Miner	Jerome Schwartz & Miguel Ian Raya	March 16, 2018	2.38
147	14	"The Girl in the Tower"	Antonio Negret	Dana Horgan & Leah Fong	March 23, 2018	2.11
148	15	"Sisterhood"	Ellen S. Pressman	Christopher Hollier & Adam Karp	March 30, 2018	2.03
149	16	"Breadcrumbs"	Ron Underwood	Jane Espenson & Jerome Schwartz	April 6, 2018	2.15
150	17	"Chosen"	Lana Parrilla	Paul Karp & Brian Ridings	April 13, 2018	2.18
151	18	"The Guardian"	Geofrey Hildrew	David H. Goodman & Brigitte Hales	April 20, 2018	2.12
152	19	"Flower Child"	Tessa Blake	Edward Kitsis & Adam Horowitz	April 27, 2018	1.98
153	20	"Is This Henry Mills?"	Ron Underwood	Dana Horgan & Leah Fong	May 4, 2018	1.98
154	21	"Homecoming"	Steve Pearlman	David H. Goodman	May 11, 2018	2.26
155	22	"Leaving Storybrooke"	Ralph Hemecker	Edward Kitsis & Adam Horowitz	May 18, 2018	2.27

== Specials ==
No.	Title	Narrator	Aired between	Original release date	US viewers (millions)
1	"Magic Is Coming"	Giancarlo Esposito	"A Land Without Magic" "Broken"	September 30, 2012	6.04
2	"The Price of Magic"	Alan Dale	"Selfless, Brave and True" "Lacey"	April 14, 2013	5.17
3	"Journey to Neverland"	Alfred Molina	"And Straight On 'til Morning" "The Heart of the Truest Believer"	September 29, 2013	5.07
4	"Wicked Is Coming"	Dan Stevens	"Going Home" "New York City Serenade"	March 9, 2014	4.44
5	"Storybrooke Has Frozen Over"	John Rhys-Davies	"There's No Place Like Home" "A Tale of Two Sisters"	September 28, 2014	5.50
6	"Secrets of Storybrooke"	Jennifer Morrison	"Heroes and Villains" "Darkness on the Edge of Town"	March 1, 2015	4.45
7	"Dark Swan Rises: A Once Upon a Time Fan Celebration"	Howard Parker	"Operation Mongoose, Part 2" "The Dark Swan"	September 27, 2015	3.20
8	"Evil Reigns Once More"	Howard Parker	"An Untold Story" "The Savior"	September 25, 2016	2.86
9	"The Final Battle Begins"	Howard Parker	"The Song in Your Heart" "The Final Battle"	May 14, 2017	2.82

== Home media releases ==
Season	Episodes	DVD and Blu-ray release date		
Season	Episodes	Region 1	Region 2	Region 4
1	22	August 28, 2012	October 31, 2012	October 17, 2012
2	22	August 13, 2013	November 18, 2013	October 16, 2013
3	22	August 19, 2014	March 14, 2016	November 12, 2014
4	22	August 18, 2015	May 9, 2016	August 17, 2016
5	23	August 16, 2016	October 17, 2016	December 7, 2016
6	22	August 15, 2017	October 16, 2017	November 8, 2017
7	22	August 28, 2018	October 8, 2018	July 11, 2018

== Ratings ==
Once Upon a Time : U.S. viewers per episode (millions)

Season	Episode number																							Average
Season	1	2	3	4	5	6	7	8	9	10	11	12	13	14	15	16	17	18	19	20	21	22	23	Average
1	12.94	11.74	11.45	11.36	10.69	9.66	8.92	10.35	9.83	9.33	10.91	8.65	9.84	10.67	9.29	8.69	8.82	8.36	9.08	9.20	8.95	9.67	–	9.93
2	11.36	9.84	9.45	9.89	9.85	10.15	8.75	8.82	9.10	9.10	8.24	7.68	7.08	7.61	7.39	7.64	7.45	7.38	7.37	7.16	7.50	7.33	–	8.46
3	8.52	8.00	7.53	7.05	7.23	7.55	6.71	6.66	6.64	6.94	6.44	7.66	7.75	6.91	6.64	7.26	6.50	5.95	7.34	6.86	6.80	6.80	–	7.08
4	10.20	9.24	7.92	8.07	6.87	7.54	7.42	6.80	6.43	6.20	5.69	6.66	6.72	5.88	5.79	5.48	5.17	5.12	5.21	5.31	5.51	5.51	–	6.58
5	5.93	5.38	5.28	4.92	5.12	4.83	4.88	4.85	4.85	4.38	4.56	4.01	4.31	3.54	3.51	3.78	3.75	3.76	3.85	3.77	3.75	4.07	4.07	4.40
6	3.99	3.72	4.11	3.53	3.40	3.06	3.56	3.40	3.28	3.27	3.03	3.06	2.71	2.85	2.80	2.60	2.51	2.69	3.05	2.87	2.95	2.95	–	3.15
7	3.26	2.74	2.49	2.44	2.29	2.37	2.28	2.28	2.45	2.29	2.14	2.22	2.38	2.11	2.03	2.15	2.18	2.12	1.98	1.98	2.26	2.27	–	2.31

Audience measurement performed by Nielsen Media Research
