= The Garden of Forking Paths (Once Upon a Time) =

- Once Upon a Time episode
- Episode no.: Season 7 Episode 3
- Directed by: Ron Underwood
- Written by: David H. Goodman; Brigitte Hales

Guest appearances
- Emma Booth as Witch; Mekia Cox as Tiana/Sabine; Simon Arblaster as Michael Griffiths; Richard Newman as Jeremiah

Episode chronology
| ← Previous "A Pirate's Life" | Next → "Beauty" |
- Once Upon a Time season 7

"The Garden of Forking Paths" is the third episode of the seventh season and the 136th episode overall of the American fantasy-drama series Once Upon a Time. Written by David H. Goodman and Brigitte Hales and directed by Ron Underwood, it premiered on ABC in the United States on October 20, 2017.

In the episode, Cinderella befriends Tiana and an offer by Lady Tremaine to lure Henry into a trap is detailed, while Victoria's plot to destroy a community garden that Jacinda is trying to stop and Lucy believes that a secret reason for it that draws Henry into the mystery is displayed in the present day, along with another secret about Victoria that she has kept hidden.

== Plot ==
=== Opening sequence ===
An excavator is featured in the background.

=== In the characters' past ===
At the location of the portal where she was supposed to meet Henry, Cinderella encounters Lady Tremaine's guards. However, the guards were attacked by Cinderella and at the last minute are ambushed by Princess Tiana, who happens to be the leader of a resistance group. As the two forged an alliance upon meeting each other, Tiana tells Cinderella that the prince killing her father was planned by Tremaine. As Cinderella agreed to join Tiana, she also left behind her glass slipper for Henry to find. The following day, Tiana informed Cinderella that Tremaine has moved something that they can't identify to her manor, but Cinderella knows what it is but says that she doesn't. Soon they're joined by Henry, Hook, and Regina, who Tiana believes the latter can prove valuable in their fight against Tremaine.

That night, Cinderella made a secret return to the manor to confront Tremaine over why she murdered her father, but Tremaine explained that it was Cinderella's fault as she revealed a coffin that she had moved earlier, which contained the preserved body of Tremaine's daughter Anastasia. Tremaine offered a deal to spare Cinderella and the resistance on the condition that she steal Henry's heart because Anastasia needs a heart full of belief in order to be revived. This puts Cinderella in a dilemma, so she uses another idea. The previous day, Tiana introduced Cinderella to a resistance member who is ready to devote himself to the cause, but when Regina sees what Cinderella was planning to do, she stopped her, telling Cinderella that doing so would be a major mistake. The next day, Regina catches Cinderella trying to run away, then gets to open up about her relationship with Tremaine. Cinderella tells Regina that her father's death is tied to Anastasia's and her own involvement led to Tremaine's hatred for her. Regina suggested to Cinderella that the only way to fight back is to use forgiveness, and Cinderella agreed to stay with the resistance, just in time to warn them about Tremaine's plot, and eventually put the plans on hold for now.

=== In Seattle ===
At the community garden, Jacinda is still upset over being separated from Lucy as she shared letters between the two with Sabine about protecting the garden. However, Victoria shows up at the garden and is ready to replace the lot with a new building and refuses to listen, even if it is for Lucy's sake. After stopping by Roni's, Roni tells Jacinda the only way to stop Victoria's plan is to launch a petition that would lead to an injunction in order to prove that the garden is viable to the community. The petition campaign gathers enough signatures for Jacinda to get the injunction, but Victoria shows up with an offer to give up the petition in favor of giving her a condominium for her and Lucy. Unfortunately, when Lucy sees this, she turns on Jacinda for giving in to Victoria's scheme. Hours later and after getting advice from Roni, Jacinda decides to fight back against Victoria by gathering the residents to sign the petition, which impresses Henry and Lucy.

Lucy suspects that Victoria is trying to destroy the garden because she might be hiding something. When an excavator hits an object that they cannot break, Lucy believes that there's something at the bottom of the site and jumps into the hole and Henry follows. As Lucy continues to ask Henry about where his family was buried, she comes across a piece she believes was from Cinderella's glass slipper, and she gives it to Henry as proof that Jacinda was Cinderella and starts to somehow believe her. However, later that night Henry goes to a cemetery and finds the headstones of his late wife and child.

Meanwhile, Roni informs Henry and Rogers about a customer who came into the bar for drinks and tells them that he is the building inspector, leading Rogers to suspect that he might be being bribed by Victoria. Rogers decides to keep an eye on the official to see if his hunch is right, but Weaver becomes suspicious after Rogers lied to him and followed him. As expected, the official meets with Victoria and Rogers confront him, only to have the inspector turn the tables by bribing Rogers with Victoria's money, and Rogers arrests the official. Later on at the station, Rogers sees Weaver release the inspector due to Rogers arresting him without launching an investigation, but tells Rogers that they might use the inspector as an informant to get more information on Victoria and will contact Weaver at the first opportunity, which doesn't sit well with Rogers.

Finally, the construction workers deliver a coffin to Victoria, and she opens it, revealing the still preserved body of Anastasia, as it turns out that Victoria was never cursed, thus revealing that she was Tremaine all along. She then visits a secret location in Belfrey Tower to see a woman who she had chained up. Tremaine wants the woman to come up with a spell to strip Lucy of her belief in order to revive Anastasia, but the woman refuses and warns Tremaine/Victoria that by doing so will not only destroy Lucy, but will have to deal with the woman herself, as there would be consequences.

== Production ==
Three scenes from the episode were cut after they were filmed, that of the interactivity between Rogers and Sabine sitting on a bench, and another between Roni and Lucy at the garden, and one last scene where Sabine uses a dating app, where you swipe if it is a frog or a prince and goes to a date with an unnamed man.

== Casting ==
- This episode was to have featured Adelaide Kane, but her scenes were cut.
- This episode also introduced Emma Booth's character, the Witch.
- It was also the last episode to credit Mekia Cox as a guest star, as she will be billed as a main cast member, starting with Greenbacks.
- Simon Arblaster (Michael Griffiths) and Richard Newman (Jeremiah) also appeared in major co-starring roles.

== Reception ==
=== Reviews ===
The episode received mixed to positive reviews. Paul Dailly of TV Fanatic gave it a 3.8 out of 5 stars, stating that it was an improvement from the previous episode but had some weak spots, stating that “The Garden of Forking Paths" was another solid installment of the series. Despite some issues, the new world is starting to take shape, and it's making things more exciting. ” Entertainment Weekly's Justin Kirkland gave it a B, seeing the improvement in the storyline. Nick Hogan of TVOvermind gave the episode a 2.5 out of 5 stars rating, stating “Overall, this was a fine episode. It just didn't have anything memorable or remarkable about it. I expect that the details revealed in it will be important soon, though, so at least read a recap if you are cutting back on your watching efforts.”
