= The Guardian (Once Upon a Time) =

- Once Upon a Time episode
- Episode no.: Season 7 Episode 18
- Directed by: Geofrey Hildrew
- Written by: David H. Goodman; Brigitte Hales
- Original air date: April 20, 2018

Guest appearances
- Rose Reynolds as Alice/Tilly; Nathan Parsons as Nick Branson; Daniel Francis as Facilier/Mr. Samdi; Tiera Skovbye as Robin Hood/Margot; Jeff Pierre as Drew

Episode chronology
← Previous "Chosen"	Next → "Flower Child"
- Once Upon a Time season 7

"The Guardian" is the eighteenth episode of the seventh season and the 151st episode overall of the American fantasy-drama series Once Upon a Time. Written by David H. Goodman & Brigitte Hales, and directed by Geofrey Hildrew, it premiered on ABC in the United States on April 20, 2018.

In the episode, Weaver takes matters into his own hands when his dagger is stolen, while Margot and Tilly go on their first date, and Henry is conflicted over the truth that he could be Lucy's father. In the past, Rumplestiltskin encounters Alice in their first meeting as he tries to rid himself of the Darkness.

== Plot ==
=== Opening sequence ===
Flowers from Belle's shrine adorn the series' fonts. The Seattle scenery is not featured.

=== In the Characters' Past ===
It has been an eternity for Rumplestiltskin since Belle's passing while enduring his life in the new Enchanted Forest realm. As he deals with the loss of his wife, Facilier shows up and offers a chance to communicate with Belle by having Rumplestiltskin give up his dagger in exchange. Knowing Rumple, he doesn't want to make a deal involving the dagger and it leads to a battle that Rumplestiltskin wins. Facilier however does tell Rumplestiltskin that Belle wants him to find the Guardian, a person who is ready to take possession of the dagger and lead Rumplestiltskin out of the darkness, but if he fails the dagger will become the sole possession of Facilier.

Later on in the Forest, Rumplestiltskin watched Alice and Robin while staying hidden, but (Wish) Hook catches him and warns him to stay away, despite claiming that Alice might be the Guardian he was looking for. Hours later and with the Darkness ready to consume him, Rumplestiltskin got the opportunity to see Alice and tells her that he has a way to break the curse put on her father's heart and that Facilier has the magic they need, but he won't give it up without a fight. Alice says she'll do whatever it takes to reunite with her father, but is horrified when she learns what it will take.

When Facilier arrives, Rumplestiltskin tests out Alice's proof of being the Guardian by having her rip Facilier's heart out, but despite being desperate to save Hook, she refused to crush it and runs off. However, Rumplestiltskin did tell Alice that she was indeed the Guardian that will take possession of the dagger. As they start the transfer, Rumplestiltskin hears Belle's voice coming from the dagger. Realizing that this would become a burden on Alice, Rumplestiltskin holds off on giving up the dagger until he found the perfect way to rid himself of the darkness, and wants Alice to be happy with Robin so she won't have to deal with the burden of the dagger.

Later on, Alice convinced Hook that Rumplestiltskin was a changed person, a decision that would change the outcome in which the Wish Realm Hook and the Enchanted Forest Rumplestiltskin became friends.

=== In The Present Day ===
At the police station, Weaver and Rogers are about to question Nick about the murders, only to discover him dead. Weaver realizes that Samdi is responsible for Hansel's death, and he leaves Rogers to lock down the building to stop Samdi, only to discover that it's too late as Weaver finds the dagger missing and believes it is in Samdi's possession. Later on, Weaver visits Regina for help and tells her why he wants the dagger back, and to acquire some of the magic she's using to save Henry, but Regina turns him down. However, she agreed to confront Samdi about the dagger. When Regina went to visit Samdi, he admitted to killing Hansel but it wasn't him who took the dagger. Weaver doesn't buy Samdi's claim when he later confronted him and is ready to shoot Samdi, who reminded Weaver that he can't kill him without risking a permanent separation from Belle. Knowing the implications, Weaver is determined to find the dagger, no matter the cost.

Margot meets up with Tilly (during the time she began hearing the “buzzing” coming from the dagger she was unaware of), and the two plan for their first date together. The women visit a book shop, where Margot shows Tilly travel books on places she has seen upon learning about Tilly's desire to travel one day, only to be interrupted by the dagger's voices again and the date abruptly ends. Later on at Roni's, Tilly catches up with Margot to apologize for ending the date, but Margot isn't worried about this, saying she understands and still wants to be there regardless.

Weaver later resorted to desperate measures by stealing the magic ingredients from Regina without her knowing in order to create a tracker spell, which eventually leads him to Tilly. The voices Tilly was hearing were coming from the dagger itself, in her backpack, thus revealing her to Weaver as the Guardian, but at the same time he believes that she didn't take the weapon. After the dagger is back in his possession, Regina visits Weaver and discovers the identity of the Guardian. She then confronts him on stealing the magic from her, thus ending any chance of her saving Henry. Feeling betrayed, Regina tells Weaver it's over between the two. In between the events, Henry is still confused over why Nick tried to kill him and as he explains what happened to Jacinda, he is more concerned about the test results that Nick showed him. He later asks Rogers (who was checking surveillance to see who last visited Hansel but Samdi had it altered) to return to the apartment to find the evidence. Rogers also notices another surveillance camera of Drew near the police station, thus giving Rogers suspicions about him. As the two return to the apartment, Henry finds the paperwork, but then he and Rogers hear sounds and chase down the intruder, who they discover is Drew. It turns out that Drew was trying to find a way to protect himself from Samdi, and tells the two that Samdi was responsible for Nick's death, but Drew was afraid to go to authorities in fear of how powerful Samdi is, and Drew hints at how Nick actually died. When they see the autopsy results, they discover Nick died from a stab, but from within instead of outside the body, Rogers begins to suspect something isn't right in this town, as Drew alluded earlier.

Henry later shares the results of the blood test with Jacinda after having it confirmed at the hospital. The discovery has Henry and Jacinda realizing that Lucy was telling the truth, about everything, all along.

== Casting Notes ==
Both Allison Fernandez and Mekia Cox are credited but don't appear in the episode. Although uncredited, archive sound of Emilie de Ravin is used.

== Reception ==
=== Reviews ===
The episode received mixed to positive reviews, with the storylines fleshing out a lot more than in the previous outings.

TV Fanatic gave the episode a 3.3 out of 5 stars.

Entertainment Weekly's Justin Kirkland gave the episode a B.
