= A Taste of the Heights =

- Once Upon a Time episode
- Episode no.: Season 7 Episode 12
- Directed by: Nina Lopez-Corrado
- Written by: David H. Goodman; Brigitte Hales

Guest appearances
- Rebecca Mader as Zelena/Kelly; Daniel Francis as Dr. Facilier/Mr. Samdi; Robin Givens as Eudora; Jeff Pierre as Naveen/Drew; Chilton Crane as Hilda Braeburn/Blind Witch

Episode chronology
| ← Previous "Secret Garden" | Next → "Knightfall" |
- Once Upon a Time season 7

"A Taste of the Heights" is the twelfth episode of the seventh season and the 145th episode overall of the American fantasy-drama series Once Upon a Time. Written by David H. Goodman and Brigitte Hales and directed by Nina Lopez-Corrado, it premiered on ABC in the United States on March 9, 2018.

In the episode, Regina and Zelena become suspicious of another character hiding his ruse as being cursed while at the same time uses a friend of Sabine's to win her with loyalty, Henry's romance with Jacinda is about to be sidetracked after Lucy discovers a passage in the storybook, and Rogers and Weaver discovers a new twist that is tied to the doctor's death. In the past, Tiana is warned by Facilier about a threat that leads her to Naveen once again helping her in this quest.

== Plot ==
=== Opening sequence ===
The “Rollin’ Bayou” is featured in the background.

=== In the Characters' Past ===
During the coronation of Tiana from princess to queen, Facilier shows up with a set of tarot cards to warn her of impending danger. Skeptical about his claims, Tiana decided to find out anyway with help from Cinderella and Hook. They soon stumble upon a major wreckage that was caused by a giant alligator, and discovers Prince Naveen there, as he is also hunting down the creature. A reluctant Tiana allowed Naveen to lead them as he can track the footprints of the alligator, and it leads them to a narrow bog, and Tiana and Naveen take the risk by crossing the lake in hopes of capturing the creature. Tiana, who had suspected that Naveen was doing this as sport, learned from the Prince its out of seeking revenge for killing his brother.

As they reached the middle of the lake, the gator went after Naveen and snatched him, but Tiana suddenly remembered seeing a spear that Naveen had that was similar to the one Facilier had and she used it to kill the creature but Naveen is now badly injured. When they returned to land, they are greeted by Facilier, who healed Naveen but at a price, which was to have the gator killed in order to retrieve a necklace. Tiana agreed to the favor but after he healed Naveen, Facilier used his magic to send him away until Naveen can repay him back.

Days later after the coronation, Tiana asks her friends to help guard the kingdom as she prepares to meet her people. However, Regina hangs back and confronts Facilier, who had been hiding behind some curtains. It turns out that the necklace Facilier was trying to retrieve belonged to Regina/The Evil Queen, and she was hoping that he returned it to her as part of a deal that was made between the two, who embrace and kiss passionately.

=== In The Present Day ===
Henry has now taken on a new role as a podcaster, and as he uses the podcast to point out Victoria's suspiciously shady deals in the wake of her death, he also talks about Jacinda, of which he hopes to win her affections.

At the food truck, Sabine is ready to sell her beignets when a former classmate from cooking school named Drew (Prince Naveen in this cursed realm) shows up with his food truck offering Cajun food. As the two complimented each other on their specialties, an officer showed up to shut Sabine's truck down over a delayed permit and she suspected Drew of doing this, but Drew, being noble about his upbringing and his decision to reject his family's path, helps Sabine find her permit. Unfortunately, it turns out that Drew is aligned with a mysterious character named Samdi, who is Dr. Facilier.

The presence of Samdi is getting the attention of Regina and Zelena as well, but they know that he isn’t cursed either because when he showed up with an offer to pay for the bar, the sisters pretended to act as if they were cursed to see if he knew if they were, and their hunch was right (he got their cursed names wrong). Samdi later offers Regina a chance to enjoy an evening with him, and after contemplation, she agrees.

Meanwhile, as Henry and Jacinda become more of a couple, Lucy's chance of becoming a family is dashed: a new page appears to her from the “Once Upon a Time” book and discovers a passage that reveals the fate of the curse, that if Henry and Jacinda kissed, he’ll die upon the breaking of the curse, so she stopped the two from kissing by literally coming in between them, claiming she just had a nightmare.

Around the same time, Weaver and Rogers began investigating the recent death of the doctor from the hospital, and it leads them to a blind baker who has ties to the doctor because she also ties to the Coven of Eight. The officers suspect that something isn’t right, so when they break in to the shop they find her unconscious by an oven as if someone was trying to kill her with carbon monoxide in order to cover their tracks. Upon examination of a similar symbol that both the doctor and the baker had tattooed, Rogers, Regina and Weaver concluded that the witches are the killer's target.

== Reception ==
The episode received mixed reviews from critics.

Entertainment Weekly's Justin Kirkland gave it a B−.
