= Breadcrumbs (Once Upon a Time) =

- Once Upon a Time episode
- Episode no.: Season 7 Episode 16
- Directed by: Ron Underwood
- Written by: Jane Espenson; Jerome Schwartz
- Original air date: April 6, 2018

Guest appearances
- Nathan Parsons as Nick Branson; Christopher Gauthier as Smee (Wish Realm); Rebecca Mader as Kelly West; Charles Mesure as Black Beard (Wish Realm); Rose Reynolds as Tilly; Tiera Skovbye as Margot

Episode chronology
← Previous "Sisterhood"	Next → "Chosen"
- Once Upon a Time season 7

"Breadcrumbs" is the sixteenth episode of the seventh season and the 149th episode overall of the American fantasy-drama series Once Upon a Time. Written by Jane Espenson & Jerome Schwartz, and directed by Ron Underwood, it premiered on ABC in the United States on April 6, 2018.

In the episode, Henry is offered a new job in New York City, but his feelings for Jacinda and Lucy, his book showing up at the scene of the Candy Killer's murders, and Nick's plans to use him, could make that difficult for Henry to leave. In Henry's past, he and Hook go on a quest to create his own story.

== Plot ==
=== Opening sequence ===
A Wish Realm version of the Jolly Roger sailing during a storm is featured in the background.

=== In the characters' past ===
In the New Enchanted Forest realm, Henry, Ella, Hook go on a quest to slay a dragon that has been harassing nearby villages, but when they enter the dragon's cave, they learn it fled weeks ago. This situation now has Henry expressing his disappointment with Hook, as he came to the new realm searching for his story because he refused to believe he was just a character in someone else's tale as he feels unworthy of Ella.

When he mentions to Hook that he wants to propose with a special ring like the one of his grandparents, Hook suggests that they retrieve one from Davy Jones' locker. Using a tracking map as a guide, the two sneak aboard the Jolly Roger to overtake it from Blackbeard in order to acquire the treasure. Unfortunately afterwards they're suddenly surprised by Blackbeard, who takes back the ship and plans to kill Henry and Hook, only to have them fight back and succeeded in overtaking Blackbeard and his crew.

However, it is revealed that it was all a set-up by Hook so that Henry could feel like he partook in an epic adventure, which suddenly becomes a real one when a storm arises. As they move closer to the storm, Henry realized that this was caused by magic because of the treasure they took from the locker, so they threw the treasure back into the ocean and Hook steers it away thus calming the storm. As they returned to land, Henry tells Hook that he may not have a story of his own but he does have a heart to give to and won't need a story for it.

Later on, Henry ends up proposing to Ella at a nearby lake and express his feelings to her that he wants to start a new chapter with her. She says yes, overjoyed at his prospect for a new adventure together.

=== In the present day ===
In Seattle, Henry lands a job interview in New York to become a podcaster. He stopped by Roni's to see if Regina was there but wasn't, but he did run into Nick, who was disappointed (but is aware) that Ivy left Seattle and promised to find another client. Henry told Jacinda about the job but that means he would have to move to New York, and apparently Jacinda supported this decision. But Lucy and Sabine both believed otherwise and suggested to Jacinda to reconsider.

At the same time, Weaver, who is relieved that Ivy and Anastasia returned to their realm, finds Henry's "Once Upon a Time" book at the crime scene and insists that Henry help the police identify the Candy Killer, whom they conclude is a man who believes he is the "Hansel" of the story "Hansel and Gretel". Henry agreed, noting that the killer is seeking vengeance for his sister's death and he's acting out on that theory after Henry spotted a series of corrections in the book, indicating that more characters that fit the descriptions in Hyperion Heights could become intended victims. Henry also told Rogers and Weaver that the killer can detect if the victims have a scar because he might be scarred from the traumatic experiences. Like Lucy and Sabine, Weaver also thinks Henry should reconsider leaving, since he liked how his favorite character (referring to the younger Henry) is depicted in the book.

When Henry gets a flat tire driving to the airport, he discovers a piece of a glass slipper on the tire, giving him a sign that he might consider staying. Nick suddenly stops by and offers Henry a ride, and he asked Nick if he could stop by to see Jacinda, only to have Henry discover burn scars on Nick, who then drugs and kidnaps him, confirming Henry's suspicions of him being Hansel/The Candy Killer. As Lucy convinced Jacinda to take Henry's call, Nick, who took the phone and declined the message, refused to listen to a drugged up Henry as he prepares to send out more heart shaped candy boxes and vows to keep on killing his intended victims.

Meanwhile, Lucy and Zelena are working on an antidote to reverse Henry's curse when Margot overheard the conversation about why her mother wanted her to return but Zelena wasn't ready to tell her yet. Around the same time, Rogers helps Tilly get a job working with Sabine at the food truck. As Margot and Tilly meet up again at the food truck the women strike up a conversation and find they have a lot in common. Both Sabine and Rogers feel enthusiastically impressed with Tilly finding a job and a new person to relate to. As Margot returned to Roni's, she forgave Zelena but felt that it was due to not seeing her fiancée in a while, so when Margot innocently shows Zelena a box of heart shaped chocolates found outside, Zelena is horrified to find that she is next on Hansel's "Candy Killer" murder spree.

== Casting notes ==
Lana Parrilla is credited, but does not appear in the episode.

== Reception ==
=== Reviews ===
The episode received positive reviews, mostly due to the storylines finally giving more in depth details to Henry and to the Tilly/Margot relationship.

TV Fanatic gave the episode a 4.2 out of 5 stars.

Entertainment Weekly's Justin Kirkland gave the episode a B+.
