= Pretty in Blue =

- Once Upon a Time episode
- Episode no.: Season 7 Episode 8
- Directed by: Ralph Hemecker
- Written by: Dana Horgan; Leah Fong

Guest appearances
- Adelaide Kane as Drizella/Ivy Belfrey; Emma Booth as Eloise Gardener; Rose Reynolds as Alice/Tilly; Nathan Parsons as Jack/Nick Branson

Episode chronology
← Previous "Eloise Gardener"	Next → "One Little Tear"
- Once Upon a Time season 7

"Pretty in Blue" is the eighth episode of the seventh season and the 141st episode overall of the American fantasy-drama series Once Upon a Time. Written by Dana Horgan & Leah Fong and directed by Ralph Hemecker, it premiered on ABC in the United States on November 17, 2017.

In the episode, Cinderella learns about what happened to her mother after she and Henry chased Alice in New Wonderland in the past, while in the present day Henry finds himself dealing with a lawyer who is helping Jacinda regain custody of Lucy, Regina tries to convince Weaver that he is Rumpelstiltskin and Ivy and Gothel seeks out Anastasia's coffin while Victoria is behind bars.

== Plot ==
=== Opening sequence ===
New Wonderland's mushrooms is featured in the background.

=== In the Characters' Past ===
In the past, Regina tells Hook about the crumbled tower that she had come across while training Drizella in magic. He is distraught but is then suddenly reunited with his daughter, Alice, who has found him in the New Enchanted Forest. He warns her to not touch him due to their curse, however, Alice claims that she had found a sorceress who cured them. They move to embrace but it only throws Hook backwards as they realize their curse hasn't actually been broken. Alice runs away in fear and Henry and Ella chase her through a portal to New Wonderland.

When Henry and Ella arrive in New Wonderland, Ella reveals that her choice to come to the realm was a personal one and that she intends to find out what happened to her mother, Cecilia, who had left her and her father behind many years ago. Ella points to what happened to her parents as the reason why she doesn't believe in true love. When they come across a single shrinking potion, Ella takes it and leaves Henry to enter the Infinite Maze, the place her mother had run into. When Ella eventually finds Alice, she notices that the other half of her mother's necklace is on a table at Alice's tea party. Alice then reveals that she had met Cecilia before and that the woman had died after a battle in which Alice was the only survivor. She also tells Ella that Cecilia had been inflicted with the same Curse of the Poisoned Heart that forced her to leave her loved ones for their own safety.

Meanwhile, Drizella is also in New Wonderland, scouring it for magical items. It is revealed that she was the one who had tricked Alice into believing her curse was broken. Drizella comes across Henry, who she intends to also give the Curse of the Poisoned Heart to but Ella and Alice are able to save him just in time. Drizella is sent away through a magic mirror. With the knowledge that her mother didn't run away because she stopped loving Ella's father, Ella decides to open herself up to a relationship with Henry and the two share their first kiss.

Henry and Ella make their way back to Hook and Regina without Alice, who has chosen to stay away for the time being. Alice had given Ella the knight chess piece to give to Hook, as she no longer needed a reminder that they'd be together once again. Later, a man wanders into their camp and is revealed to be Jack, a friend of Henry's whom he had met during his early years of traveling the realms. Henry introduces him to Ella.

=== In Seattle ===
In the present day, Jacinda is trying to regain custody of Lucy after Victoria was taken to jail for the kidnapping of Eloise Gardener. She contacts Nick, a lawyer whom she has been cursed to believe is Lucy's biological father. He agrees to help her and they end up going out to dinner. Sabine warns Jacinda against exploring feelings for Nick again, which Jacinda isn't sure she does or doesn't have. Henry is disappointed by the turn of events, while Lucy explains that the situation is simply playing out like the David, Mary Margaret, and Kathryn Nolan love triangle from the first curse. She insists that he is her real father and encourages him to fight for Jacinda. Henry tries impressing her by doing some more work on her food truck but when Jacinda brings Nick by, he wonders if he should stop pursuing her.

Meanwhile, Regina is warning Drizella to stay away from Henry but with Victoria in jail, she and Gothel already have other plans. Drizella now wants to revive Anastasia for her own purposes. Gothel is now out and about in Hyperion Heights as Eloise Gardener. Drizella is able to locate Anastasia's coffin at Victoria's lakehouse and brings it back to Gothel, however, when they open up the coffin, they find that her body is missing, suggesting that Victoria had taken extra precautions to hide it.

Now that Roni has regained her memories as Regina, she confronts Weaver to find out if he also has his memories but he refuses to confirm to her that he has woken up from the curse. Realizing that he'll be of no help, she later tells Henry that she's heading down to San Francisco to find someone who had been pushed out of town by Victoria. Henry, who has been heavily drinking to get over Jacinda, agrees to accompany her on the trip. Jacinda drops by the bar later to look for Henry but is informed by Remy, the temporary barkeep, that Regina and Henry had already left town. Despite Jacinda having signed away her rights to Lucy many years ago, Nick is able to come through with the legal help and Jacinda and Lucy are reunited. Lucy is then formally introduced to Nick.

== Casting ==
- Gabrielle Anwar was credited in this episode, but does not appear.

== Notes ==
- The version of Wonderland featured in this episode is different from the one shown in the first six seasons of the series and the spin-off. It is a new iteration, much like the New Enchanted Forest.

== Reception ==
=== Reviews ===
The episode received positive reviews from critics.

Paul Dailly of TV Fanatic gave it a 3.5 out of 5 stars.

Entertainment Weekly's Justin Kirkland gave it a B.
