= Sisterhood (Once Upon a Time) =

- Once Upon a Time episode
- Episode no.: Season 7 Episode 15
- Directed by: Ellen S. Pressmen
- Written by: Christopher Hollier; Adam Karp
- Original air date: March 30, 2018

Guest appearances
- Emma Booth as Eloise Gardener/Gothel; Daniel Francis as Dr. Facilier/Mr. Samdi; Adelaide Kane as Drizella/Ivy Belfrey; Nathan Parsons as Nick Branson; Sara Canning as Gretel; Yael Yurman as Anastasia; Anna Cathcart as Tween Drizella

Episode chronology
← Previous "The Girl in the Tower"	Next → "Breadcrumbs"
- Once Upon a Time season 7

"Sisterhood" is the fifteenth episode of the seventh season and the 148th episode overall of the American fantasy-drama series Once Upon a Time. Written by Christopher Hollier & Adam Karp, and directed by Ellen S. Pressman, it premiered on ABC in the United States on March 30, 2018.

In the episode, Ivy must find a way to help Anastasia as the mysterious killer continues to hunt down more victims, while Henry tries to get over his feelings towards Jacinda during a night out with Rogers and Nick. In the past, Drizella is tempted by Gothel to joining The Coven of Eight, but has to face a test after she pairs up with another prospect, Gretel. The killer is finally revealed.

== Plot ==
=== Opening sequence ===
Flynn's Barcade Bar is featured in the background.

=== In the Characters' Past ===
In a flashback in the new realm, a young Drizella is playing hide-and-seek with Anastasia, but when Drizella gets lost, Anastasia lights a lantern that leads Drizella to her. Anastasia then says that as long as they're together, they can always find their way home.

Years later, and with Anastasia now lying in a comatose state, Drizella admitted to planning on casting the new dark curse in order to make her mother suffer. Regina soon joined Drizella to offer help but turned her down, just in time to reveal Regina as Gothel in disguise and tempting her with an offer to join a group of women known as the Coven of Eight. As Drizella accepted the offer, Gothel only had two spots left while going through a recruiting process. Gothel says she's hidden two golden flowers somewhere in the forest and whoever brings her the flowers will prove themselves worthy of joining the Coven. Gothel tells Drizella that she has to do the task alone, but she instead partners up with another recruit named Gretel.

As the two women bond over having to deal with the loss of a sibling, with Gretel revealing how her brother Hansel had changed after the events of dealing with a witch but has never been the same since and has taken on a new identity. Both Drizella and Gretel comes across a fork in the road, the two agreed to separate then meet up. During this separation, Gothel appears to Drizella to reveal that the test was actually an elimination that determines eligibility into the sisterhood. Gothel wants Drizella to kill Gretel with a sai or tekpi-type weapon but Drizella decided against it because of Gothel's true intentions. When Gretel returns, Drizella suggest that they form their own sisterhood in order to get what they wanted, but soon that idea is scratched when Gretel reveals the same weapon that Drizella had. It turns out Gothel had set them both up with orders to kill one another. The women soon fight each other but as Gretel was about to kill her Drizella sends her weapon towards Gretel and she kills her instead. Gothel appears to Drizella, telling her that she has been accepted into the Coven of Eight, thus marking the events leading up to the Dark Curse.

=== In The Present Day ===
As Ivy continues her search for Anastasia, she is enticed by Gothel to once again join her Coven, but Ivy turns down Gothel's offers as she wants her sister's powers and she will not sacrifice herself in order to do so. Gothel then hands her a heart shaped box of chocolates which were outside in the lobby (implying that she is the next target), warning her of a serial killer that are after women who have ties to the Coven, but Ivy doesn't believe Gothel's story, that is, until later on that night when the masked Candy Killer goes after Ivy but she escaped his attempts. Ivy then approached Regina for help afterwards. Regina is still upset over what Ivy did to her and Henry but agreed to help. As Regina consulted Weaver on this situation, Ivy is approached by Samdi, who knows about what and why the Candy Killer is after her. Samdi tells Ivy the only way to save both her and Anastasia is using a magic bean that can create a portal, using reinforcement by Anastasia's powers.

Later that evening, Ivy and Anastasia finally meet up, with Ivy ready to forgive Anastasia and promised to help each other get home to their realm with a magic bean. But instead of pulling the bean out of her pocket, she pulled out poppy dust, betraying Anastasia and putting her to sleep. When Ivy takes Anastasia back to Samdi, their attempt to exorcise her powers is interrupted by Gothel, who wakes her up and compels her to kill Ivy. However, Ivy pleads with Anastasia, saying that if she does kill her she would end up giving in to Gothel's control, but Anastasia refuses to kill her sister, much to the dismay of Gothel, who escapes angrily. When Regina and Weaver arrived to see the damage done in the place, they're relieved to see Ivy and Anastasia embraced each other as sisters again. Ivy also apologized to Regina for what she did to Henry and her, with Regina saying she understands. As Ivy and Anastasia say goodbye to Regina and Weaver, Anastasia uses her magic to create the portal, and they go back to their realm.

Back at the bar, Regina confronted Samdi over what happened, but Samdi assures Regina that he was doing this to save Henry by extracting Anastasia's magic into a bottle so Henry will live once his curse is broken but at the same time warns Regina about Weaver's intentions. And as Samdi leaves the bar, Weaver is waiting for him, saying that he's keeping the dagger in his possession, despite Samdi's cautionary message about Weaver's desire to be with Belle.

In between the events, Lucy and Regina come up with a way to perk up Henry while at the same time must keep him and Jacinda from kissing each other, so Regina suggests that Henry get together with Rogers and Nick for a night out (since Hook and Jack were his best friends in the past life). Thanks to Regina texting Rogers and Nick, the guys are able to track Henry to Flynn's Barcade, a local bar that Henry frequents. The two suddenly decided to stick around and help Henry out with his romantic feelings towards Jacinda, giving Nick an idea by making a bet that Henry can move on from Jacinda, by asking out the first woman who walks into the bar, who, as fate would have it, was Jacinda herself. After the two talk for a while, Jacinda challenge Henry to a game in which he had a coin that if he tossed it into a glass then he would believe in the fairytales that Lucy had told him. When he threw the coin, a bartender takes up the glass and it misses. However, Jacinda doesn't stay long as she has to meet up with Sabine later; surprisingly enough when Jacinda threw a coin into a glass back at home, she succeeded. Hours later after the bar closes, Henry, Rogers, and Nick say their goodbyes, with Nick wishing Rogers good luck on the case. Unbeknownst to Henry and Rogers, after they left Nick alone to fix a flat tire, Nick opens up his car trunk which revealed the heart-shaped boxes, envelopes, objects, and the mask, revealing him to be the Candy Killer who has been targeting the coven witches.

== Casting notes ==
Mekia Cox is credited but doesn't appear in the episode. This episode also marked Adelaide Kane's final appearance.

== Reception ==
=== Reviews ===
The episode received positive reviews, notably towards the scenes involving Anastasia and Ivy.

TV Fanatic gave the episode a 4.2 out of 5 stars.

Entertainment Weekly's Justin Kirkland gave the episode a B.
