= The Girl in the Tower =

- Once Upon a Time episode
- Episode no.: Season 7 Episode 14
- Directed by: Antonio Negret
- Written by: Dana Horgan; Leah Fong
- Original air date: March 23, 2018

Guest appearances
- Daniel Francis as Dr. Facilier/Mr. Samdi; Adelaide Kane as Drizella/Ivy Belfrey; Rebecca Mader as Zelena/Kelly; Rose Reynolds as Alice/Tilly; Tiera Skovbye as Robin Hood/Margot

Episode chronology
← Previous "Knightfall"	Next → "Sisterhood"
- Once Upon a Time season 7

"The Girl in the Tower" is the fourteenth episode of the seventh season and the 147th episode overall of the American fantasy-drama series Once Upon a Time. Written by Dana Horgan and Leah Fongand directed by Antonio Negret, it premiered on ABC in the United States on March 23, 2018.

In the episode, Rogers helps Tilly when she is accused of murder, Ivy hopes to make amends with Anastasia, and Regina enlists Lucy’s help to find out the truth about Samdi. In the past, Alice encounters a new soulmate.

== Plot ==
=== Opening sequence ===
The troll’s statue is featured in the background.

=== In the Characters' Past ===
==== Early years ====
In the new realm during a flashback, Alice makes a birthday wish to get out of the tower and shortly after, a troll suddenly appears and helps her escape the prison, hopefully to search for her father.

==== Several Years Later ====
Alice, who is still seeking out her father, is caught spying on the resistance group by Robin, who had just recently arrived to the New Enchanted Forest. Robin intends to honor her father's legacy by hunting down the troll, who has since been destroying villages, but Alice goes after her to protect it, calling it a "friend" since it had rescued her.

When they finally confront the troll, Robin is ready to kill it but Alice steps in to save him, infuriating the villagers. However, in a surprise twist, Robin ends up shielding Alice from the villagers, and uses magic to summon Emma's Yellow Bug, which transports them to the Tower, where Alice admits that she wanted to go back but now wants to experience freedom. Suddenly, the troll appears and begins destroying the Tower. Robin theorizes that Alice, by means of her wish, unintentionally created the troll to free herself. Alice then confronted the troll, calmed him, and forgave him before he, clutching the car, is turned into stone (the same stone statue that she, as Tilly, hangs out on in Hyperion Heights). Afterwards, Robin makes Alice make another wish on a birthday candle, and they bid the tower goodbye, beginning a journey together.

=== In The Present Day ===
Days after the death of the baker at the hospital, Rogers tracks Tilly down, just in time to keep the officers from finding her, and are later joined by Henry as they start looking for signs of evidence of Tilly being elsewhere during the time of the murder to clear her name. At first, while taking refuge at Henry’s apartment and hopefully find a clue, she retraces her steps after she sees a sticker on her shoe sole. Tilly grows frustrated when she finds that no one can remember seeing her at the places she had visited.

As Tilly is becoming more convinced that she might be a murderer after she discovers the snipped hair locks in her backpack, she runs away from Henry's home. She visits her troll statue, saying goodbye to it, as she plans to run away. She almost gets hit by an SUV when she is rescued by a woman named Margot (Robin in this cursed realm), and she thanks her, which Margot responds to by convincing her not to run away. Tilly also notices that Margot is reading “Alice in Wonderland,” which Margot tells her is a favorite of hers. When Rogers tells Tilly that she’ll have to turn herself in, Tilly discovers a surveillance camera hidden inside the troll's eye that can provide an alibi for her. When Tilly returns to her place, Rogers stopped by to ask her about staying at his place, and she accepts.

Meanwhile, Regina and Lucy put their plans to free Henry of his curse in motion but Regina wants to leave some of the details to herself and not share it with Zelena yet. Regina asks Samdi out on a date as a cover, so that Lucy can break into his suite to look for clues as to what he seeks in Hyperion Heights. However Zelena suddenly finds out and becomes concerned for Lucy’s safety, prompting Regina to text Lucy to leave immediately before Samdi returns. Moments later, Lucy escapes upon seeing the text but Samdi catches on when he finds Lucy’s hat.

Lucy does manage to photograph a Tarot card layout that she shows to Regina, and when Samdi visits the bar to let her know about what she did, Regina demands an answer from him about the cards, and he details a future that will determine a new love in her life, but at the same time she will have to let him seek out his quest, which is acquiring the Dark One's Dagger that Weaver currently has in his possession, a move that doesn’t sit well with Regina. Later, Regina comes clean to Zelena about this situation, as Zelena’s daughter Robin (Margot) returns to her, with Zelena remarking to Regina that it truly is hard to interact with your child under cursed circumstances.

== Casting notes ==
Mekia Cox and Robert Carlyle are credited but don't appear in the episode.

== Reception ==
=== Reviews ===
The episode received positive reviews.

TV Fanatic gave the episode a 3.8 out of 5 stars.

Entertainment Weekly's Justin Kirkland gave the episode a B−.
