= Flower Child (Once Upon a Time) =

- Once Upon a Time episode
- Episode no.: Season 7 Episode 19
- Directed by: Tessa Blake
- Written by: Edward Kitsis; Adam Horowitz
- Original air date: April 27, 2018

Guest appearances
- Emma Booth as Eloise Gardener/Gothel; Rose Reynolds as Alice/Tilly; Daniel Francis as Facilier/Mr. Samdi; Tiera Skovbye as Robin/Margot; Jeff Pierre as Drew; Gabrielle Miller as Flora; Emily Tennant as Isla; Naika Toussaint as Seraphina; Bruce Blain as Desk Sergeant; Kyra Leroux as Yarrow

Episode chronology
| ← Previous "The Guardian" | Next → "Is This Henry Mills?" |
- Once Upon a Time season 7

"Flower Child" is the nineteenth episode of the seventh season and the 152nd episode overall of the American fantasy-drama series Once Upon a Time. Written by Edward Kitsis & Adam Horowitz and directed by Tessa Blake, it premiered on ABC in the United States on April 27, 2018.

In the episode, Gothel is ready to revive the Coven and wants Tilly to be part of the plan, and Lucy turns to another solution to save Henry, who is now dealing with the reaction from Jacinda about the tests. In the past, Gothel's origins of how she formed The Coven is revealed.

== Plot ==
=== Opening sequence ===
A carriage is featured in the forest.

=== In the Characters' Past ===
Many Years Ago, a young Gothel becomes intrigued by seeing a group of women trying out dresses that they plan to wear to an upcoming ball. After they leave, Gothel sneaks in and touches the dresses and causes a small rose to magically bloom, only to be caught by the women after they return. It appears that they're intrigued by Gothel, so they ask her to teach them magic by inviting her to the party. When Gothel arrives to a garden-like location, she unlocks a special door that enters a world in which it is revealed that Gothel is actually a wood nymph and isn't human. Unfortunately, her mother is not happy about Gothel being involved with humans and wants to groom her to become her successor. She hopes that Gothel can embrace her destiny.

At the party, Gothel arrives, ready to interact with her newfound friends and show them magic. But it turns out that it was all a setup to embarrass Gothel, as they wanted to disgrace her in front of the humans by calling her an abomination. It also turns out that the humans had used this party to destroy and kill the nymphs, and when Gothel returned to the garden she finds her mother clinging to life. Her mother implores Gothel not to seek revenge on the humans and embrace her destiny by restoring their world. Gothel doesn't take her mother's words to heart and begins a mission to destroy the humans. Gothel returns to the party and begins destroying everything she touches with deadly plants and kills the person who befriended her. However, one of the friends decides she wants to join Gothel as she also kept a secret that she too has magic powers but kept it hidden in fear that she would be killed. Gothel then rids the land of humans before returning to her destroyed home with her friend.

The ending of the flashback reveals a twist in the story: the flashback of Gothel took place in the Land Without Magic, thousands of years ago. Gothel confesses to her friend that despite their realm being magical, the death of the tree nymphs by the humans has turned their realm into the first ever land without magic. Using a magic bean, Gothel and her friend decide to leave for another realm to find others like them, to prepare for their return to the Land Without Magic to rid the land of humans once again after the would-be civilization begins.

=== In The Present Day ===
At the police station, Eloise/Gothel is paying a visit, but she's more interested in recruiting the desk clerk, and she uses her magic to bring him into her plan to wake up The Coven. While this occurs, Rogers interrogates Drew about Samdi about how Nick died, only to have Drew continue to warn Rogers about how powerful Samdi is. Gothel then later stalks Tilly, but Gothel assures her that she needs to be told the truth about her, and Gothel reveals to Tilly that she is her mother. Tilly doesn't buy that claim, but Gothel reminds her that it will make sense very soon. Tilly later tells Rogers about the encounter.

At Jacinda's apartment, Henry is convinced the paternity test indicating that he is Lucy's father is genuine. But Jacinda isn't so sure and can't process the facts. Henry is starting to believe that Lucy is telling the truth and it might be tied to the book. Lucy pays a visit to Facilier/Samdi and tells him about the fallout that occurred between Regina and Weaver after he took the magic needed to save Henry (Regina hasn't answered Samdi's messages). Samdi believes that he can come up with a way to save Henry. Samdi suggests that Lucy find an item that can be used, and he warns her that Gothel is preparing for a war and Henry needs to be saved.

When Rogers and Tilly visit Henry's apartment, Henry lets them in and he shows them a display of residents that match the description of the book. They come to the conclusion that Gothel might be planning on something bigger beyond reviving the Coven. Moments later, Rogers gets a tip about Gothel's whereabouts, and he and Tilly trace it to a theater. Unfortunately, it is a trap set by Gothel, who is ready to reveal everything about Tilly and Rogers' true relationship by telling them that they're actually daughter and father by taking a drop of blood from not only Rogers and Tilly, but from Margot. Gothel threatens all three if Tilly refuses. With Rogers held hostage, Gothel compels Tilly to join her Coven, as she has magic, and Tilly gives in, as she sees this as a way to save Rogers. The Coven begins their revival of evil.

After uncovering a box of items from the apartment while attempting to convince Jacinda that she's Cinderella by rummaging through the souvenirs, Lucy finds the glass slipper and brings it to Samdi, who then uses it to create a spell that saves Henry, allowing him to live. However, when Henry returns to see Jacinda, he tells her that the stories could be real, and he and Jacinda finally kiss. But as Lucy walked inside, she is disappointed that nothing happened with the spell.

== Casting Notes ==
Lana Parrilla, Robert Carlyle and Mekia Cox are credited but don't appear in the episode.

== Reception ==
=== Reviews ===
The episode received mixed to positive reviews.

TV Fanatic gave the episode a 3.3 out of 5 stars.
