= Secret Garden (Once Upon a Time) =

- Once Upon a Time episode
- Episode no.: Season 7 Episode 11
- Directed by: Mick Garris
- Written by: Edward Kitsis; Adam Horowitz

Guest appearances
- Emma Booth as Eloise Gardener/Gothel; Adelaide Kane as Drizella/Ivy Belfrey; Rebecca Mader as Zelena/Kelly West; Nathan Parsons as Jack/Nick Branson; Tiera Skovbye as Robin Hood; Yael Yurman as Anastasia; Ayzee as Witch Friend; Suzy Joachim as Madame Leota; Willy Lavendel as Nurse; Nisreen Slim as Doctor Andrea Sage

Episode chronology
| ← Previous "The Eighth Witch" | Next → "A Taste of the Heights" |
- Once Upon a Time season 7

"Secret Garden" is the eleventh episode of the seventh season and the 144th episode overall of the American fantasy-drama series Once Upon a Time. Written by Edward Kitsis & Adam Horowitz and directed by Mick Garris, it premiered on ABC in the United States on March 2, 2018.

In the episode, Regina and Zelena have to find a way to save both Henry and Lucy, but the answer lies with Eloise when Anastasia learns the truth and could lead to consequences for Victoria and Ivy, and a new threat emerges. Back in the past, Zelena must find a way to keep Robin from becoming obsessed with magic.

== Plot ==
=== Opening sequence ===
Madame Leota is seen in the mirrored "O" of the series logo font.

=== In the Characters' Past ===
In Storybrooke, Robin is learning to practice spells, much to the dismay of Zelena, who is more upset with Regina because she gave her a book of spells. After Zelena takes away Robin's phone, Robin drops a potion and is transported to Gothel's home. Meanwhile, at Tiana's palace in the New Realm, Regina comforts Hook over Alice when Zelena arrives to confront Regina about Robin. Regina believes it has to do with Gothel. As Zelena wants to make it personal, Hook wants to help and she reluctantly agrees. When they arrived to Gothel's home, Zelena and Hook stumble upon a seance conducted by Madame Leota, and finds Robin there, but defied Zelena and Hook and forced the two to leave.

Afterwards, Hook tells Zelena that she can save Robin by using the power of love instead of magic. But later on at Gothel's home, Robin is placed in the middle of a circle to be sacrificed so Leota can live, and when Zelena sees this she pushed Robin away and Zelena finds herself making the sacrifice. However, Robin uses her bow and arrow to save Zelena by aiming it at the amulet and shoots it out of Gothel's hand. The actions helped free Zelena and Robin from Gothel's spell and they began to bond as mother and daughter again. Robin then decides to give her magic left in the amulet to Zelena and to train on using a bow.

=== In The Present Day ===
With Lucy still in a coma and the dire situation that could result in Henry dying in order to save Lucy, Regina and Zelena decided to fight back for both of them as sisters and come up with a solution. Around the same time, Anastasia gets a chance to talk to Victoria in the pit and suddenly learned the truth about why her mother resurrected her, and the reaction isn't a good one for Anastasia. Back at the hospital, Eloise/Gothel surprised Zelena and offered her a deal to help Henry and Lucy, which is re-acquire the resurrection amulet, and although she agreed to bring it back to Gothel, Zelena had other plans for the item. As she informed Regina about this, she believes that the amulet is tied to the bar that Victoria tried to buy up previously.

Rogers meets up with Weaver to learn more about Eloise, but while he has suspicions about Victoria, Rogers believes Eloise to be innocent. At the same at the hospital, a doctor is looking for a donor to run tests in order to find a match for Lucy, and Henry volunteers. Back at Gothel's lair, Ivy and Victoria find a way to escape as Victoria snagged a pulley and the two escaped. While that was taking place, Rogers visits Eloise, who tries to charm him but is unaware that Anastasia is hiding in the closet. However, when Rogers returned to see Weaver and tells him that Eloise is hiding something, Weaver is convinced that it's tied to a cult.

Later on at Roni's, the sisters, despite no longer having any magic because of the new curse, believe that they have something better. As Regina points to a stained glass sign with their cursed names on it, she offered to put the sign back up as a way to bond, but Zelena smashed the sign because that's where she hid the amulet. This gives the sisters the chance to save Lucy but Victoria shows up with a gun pointed directly at Regina and is forced to give up the amulet. When Victoria turns over the amulet to Gothel in order to save Lucy, Gothel turned to Anastasia, who then used her magic to make it useful. Unfortunately, the amulet also revealed the person who has to be sacrificed in order to make it happen, and Ivy is the chosen victim. As Gothel prepares to take Ivy's life, even as she blames her mother for how she treated her, Victoria suddenly sacrificed herself by pushing Ivy out and she sacrifices herself. Victoria's action also saved Lucy as she emerges from her coma. As Rogers and Weaver arrives they see Ivy with her deceased mother.

With Lucy back to normal and Henry and Jacinda together again, it appears that the doctor who ran the test and discovered the truth that Henry is Lucy's birth father is poisoned before she could tell him by a mysterious person who also takes the papers so Henry will never find out, and then takes a lock of hair from the doctor.

== Production ==
The episode marked the final appearance of series regular Gabrielle Anwar.

== Reception ==
=== Reviews ===
The episode received positive reviews from critics, although they thought that the chemistry was a little soft.

Paul Dailly of TV Fanatic gave it a 3.8 out of 5 stars.

Entertainment Weekly's Justin Kirkland gave it a B+.
