= Knightfall (Once Upon a Time) =

- Once Upon a Time episode
- Episode no.: Season 7 Episode 13
- Directed by: Steve Miner
- Written by: Jerome Schwartz; Miguel Ian Raya
- Original air date: March 16, 2018

Guest appearances
- Emma Booth as Eloise Gardener/Gothel; Christopher Gauthier as Smee (Wish Realm); Adelaide Kane as Ivy Belfrey; Rose Reynolds as Tilly; Chad Rook as Captain Ahab; Chilton Crane as Hilda Braeburn/Blind Witch

Episode chronology
← Previous "A Taste of the Heights"	Next → "The Girl in the Tower"
- Once Upon a Time season 7

"Knightfall" is the thirteenth episode of the seventh season and the 146th episode overall of the American fantasy-drama series Once Upon a Time. Written by Jerome Schwartz and Miguel Ian Raya and directed by Steve Miner, it premiered on ABC in the United States on March 16, 2018.

In the episode, Hook seeks out a device that will help free Alice from the Tower in the past, while in the present day Tilly becomes concerned about Rogers when Eloise agrees to be interrogated, Lucy turns to help so she can save Henry and Ivy decides to bury the hatchet with Jacinda as she looks to find Anastasia.

== Plot ==
=== Opening sequence ===
The head belonging to Ivy's doll is featured inside the "O" mirrored fonts.

=== In the Characters' Past ===
In the new realm, Alice is experiencing a nightmare that Gothel will come for her, but as she wakes up, Hook is there to comfort her, promising to end the nightmares once and for all. The two then take a pair of Chess pieces, a white knight for Alice and a black rook for Hook. Later on, he seeks out the still jailed Rumpelstiltskin for help and the two agree to a deal. Rumple informs Hook of a device that will help save his daughter, but it's already in the possession of another seafarer.

Hook arrived to confront Ahab, the current possessor of Maui's fish hook. However, Ahab starts taunting Hook, and rather than fighting, Hook and Ahab decided on a dice game with the winner getting the Jolly Roger and keeping the fish hook. Surprisingly enough, Hook wins the throw. But Ahab isn't convinced that Hook has returned to his swashbuckling ways, and as he follows Hook back to Rumple's cell the tensions between the two reach the point of taunting Hook for abandoning Alice. This leads to a gun duel between Hook and Ahab, and Hook again emerges as the winner, then runs off to return to Alice.

Unfortunately, the nightmare of Alice being taken away by Gothel comes true, as Hook returns to use the fish hook to free Alice, only to have Gothel appear and taunt Hook before banishing him for good from the Tower and acquiring the fish hook, leaving Alice screaming and crying out for her father, who is now left a weakened man.

These events are what led to Hook becoming the old, beer-bellied, depressed drunkard that was first encountered in the wish realm.

=== In The Present Day ===
Tilly starts to have strange reactions to Gothel's presence that has made her nervous, but Rogers and Weaver ignore her subliminal cry for help, as they try to focus on the case at hand involving the killings of the witches. Eloise suddenly shows up at the station and agrees to being interrogated, but only by Rogers, and Weaver allows it. The interrogation between Rogers and Gothel is turned into a mind game as Eloise uses Rogers' psyche to gauge his past, but to no avail. Outside the room, Tilly becomes concerned for Rogers as she watches by means of the surveillance camera screen, especially after he leaves the room for a second and Eloise looks directly at the camera in order to scare and taunt Tilly. Tilly again expresses her anxiety to Weaver, who blows her off yet again, claiming that Rogers is handling things.

Back in the room, Eloise tells Rogers that the killer is grappling with pain to fill a void, then offers a clue, in which the victims had a heart shaped box, and gives Rogers a cryptic message to follow his heart in order to capture the killer. When Rogers and Weaver arrive to the hospital upon learning of a delivery of heart-shaped boxes to the intended victims (including one that died years earlier), the two learn that the blind baker has been killed, and they find Tilly in the hospital room, freaking out while holding a bloody scalpel. She shouts at them, very frightened and disoriented, before escaping out a window. Rogers and Weaver come across the witches' symbol back in the warehouse but with two sectors crossed out, indicative of the two deaths. Weaver tells Rogers that he doesn't think the killer is Tilly.

When asked why she stopped Henry from kissing Jacinda, Lucy claims it is because she is jealous of Henry and looking for more time with her mother. Henry explains to Regina about what happened one morning, (Regina having just left Facilier's house) and Regina offers solace. Later on, Ivy visits Henry at his apartment, but as expected, he isn't interested in Ivy but suggests that she should find comfort with her family. Ivy somehow takes that advice and pays a surprise visit to Jacinda's by returning everything Victoria took from her as a way to bury the hatchet. Jacinda and Ivy make up and Jacinda returns to Ivy a doll that she had kept. This gives Ivy an idea, so when she returns to see Henry, she asks him to help find Anastasia as she believes that he can do this and he agrees.

Later that evening, Lucy goes to speak to Regina at her bar and shows her the page about Henry dying. When she shows the page to Regina, Regina reveals to Lucy that she is awake, and the two agreed to help find a way save Henry. The two come up a new code name for their mission, called "Operation Hyacinth."

== Casting notes ==
Mekia Cox is credited but doesn't appear in the episode.

== Reception ==
=== Reviews ===
The episode received positive reviews from critics with most of the praise going towards O'Donoghue's performance.

Buddy TV noted that it was time to give Colin O'Donoghue time to shine in this episode: "It was a convoluted road bringing him into the fold, but since his introduction, Wish Hook has been one of the highlights of Once Upon a Time season 7. Yet as fun as the character has been, he hasn't had many episodes focused purely on him, although that could be because his cursed persona is duller than Prince Charming after an all-nighter of smoldering. In this episode, "Knightfall", Once Upon a Time tries to correct things by giving an episode focused completely on Hook in both realms. It's a bumpy road, certainly in the Rogers half, but because Colin O'Donoghue is leading it, there is the usual Hook charm at play that makes up a lot of slack."

Entertainment Weekly's Justin Kirkland had no grade for this episode.
