= Meegan Warner =

Australian actress (born 1991)

- Born: August 5, 1991 (age 34); Sydney, New South Wales, Australia
- Education: Screenwise
- Occupation: Actress

Meegan Warner (born August 5, 1991) is an Australian actress. She is known for her portrayal of Mary Woodhull in the AMC series Turn: Washington's Spies and as young Lady Rapunzel Tremaine in Once Upon a Time.

== Filmography ==
=== Television ===
Year	Title	Role	Notes
2014-2017	Turn: Washington's Spies	Mary Woodhull	Main role
2017	Once Upon a Time	Lady Rapunzel Tremaine (young)	Recurring; 2 episodes
