= Wish You Were Here (Once Upon a Time) =

- Once Upon a Time episode
- Episode no.: Season 6 Episode 10
- Directed by: Ron Underwood
- Written by: Edward Kitsis & Adam Horowitz
- Production code: 610
- Original air date: December 4, 2016

Guest appearances
- Deniz Akdeniz as Aladdin; Lee Arenberg as Leroy/Grumpy; Karen David as Jasmine; Beverley Elliott as Granny; Geoff Gustafson as Stealthy; Sean Maguire as Robin of Locksley; Giles Matthey as Morpheus/Gideon; Keegan Connor Tracy as Mother Superior

Episode chronology
| ← Previous "Changelings" | Next → "Tougher Than the Rest" |
- Once Upon a Time season 6

"Wish You Were Here" is the tenth episode of the sixth season of the American fantasy drama series Once Upon a Time, which aired on December 4, 2016. In this episode, when the Evil Queen uses Aladdin to make Emma's secret wish that she wasn't the Savior a reality, Regina tries to save her, while Gold and Belle learn about the dangers awaiting Gideon.

== Plot ==
=== Opening sequence ===
A statue of Queen Snow White and King David is featured in the forest.

=== Event chronology ===
The Wish Realm events take place in a realm in which the Dark Curse never happened, and before the events of "Tougher Than the Rest", "Homecoming", and "Leaving Storybrooke". The Storybrooke events take place after "Changelings".

=== In Storybrooke ===
As Regina takes Emma and Hook to her vault, the three come across the Evil Queen kneeling in front of Robin Hood's grave, infuriating Regina. The Evil Queen taunts Regina, claiming that "love is weakness", before taunting Emma over her sleeping parents, drawing a "Sleeping Beauty" analogy. Emma is infuriated, draws out the sword from her visions, and cuts into the Evil Queen's cheek, but as Regina checks to see if she had the same cut, they learn that it only affected her other half. Learning that the sword can kill the Evil Queen for good, Emma attempts to run her through, but The Evil Queen teleports away, and comes across Gold, who places a gold tracking cuff on her arm, vowing to pick up where Emma left off, in the event that she doesn't kill her. Moments later, Emma, now discovering that the sword can be used on a serum (The Evil Queen), is joined by Hook and David. When they hear Jasmine screaming at Granny's, they find her bound to a chair, which they discovered was a trap by The Evil Queen, who forced Emma to put down her sword or she'll kill Jasmine. The Evil Queen then summons Aladdin from the lamp and uses her first wish, granting Emma her secret wish to no longer be the savior, which she made to Aladdin previously, and Aladdin makes Emma disappear. Later on, Regina tracks down the Evil Queen in the Mayor's office, with Aladdin serving drinks to her. Knowing that she and The Evil Queen are the same person, Regina asks Aladdin to send her to the same place as Emma, and he grants her wish.

David, now furious with the Evil Queen, tricks her into fighting, however he steals the lamp partway through the fight, and becomes Aladdin's new master. Now under David's command, David taunts Regina by calling her a snake, and wishes that “the Evil Queen gets exactly what she deserves,” but nothing happens, and the Evil Queen presumes that she has already received what she deserves, The Savior gone and Snow under a Sleeping Curse, all to make David's life miserable. Hook, Henry and Jasmine appear to apprehend the Evil Queen, however she gets away. David then gives the lamp back to Jasmine, so she and Aladdin may wish themselves to Agrabah, and they so do. That night, The Evil Queen, now happy that she got her "revenge," suddenly noticed a flash of light appearing inside Granny's, and the hooded figure from Emma's vision appears. When she attempts to confront the person, he transforms the Evil Queen into a snake, thus giving her "exactly what she deserves." Leroy carries the cage to the loft by telling David and Hook the caged cobra "is actually Evil Queen" placed there by a guy in the cloak. David asks him who was the guy under the hood.

Meanwhile, after failing to track his son, Gold seeks out Belle and tells her that with no way or means of finding Gideon, their son isn't safe. In order to prove his good intentions, he removes Belle's tracking bracelet, as she calls the Convent, and realizes that all is not well. As they arrive at the convent, a seriously ill Mother Superior tells them that the Black Fairy kidnapped Gideon, and left her in that state. At Mr. Gold's shop, Gold reveals to Belle that it was the Evil Queen who accelerated her pregnancy, as the pair decide to work together in order to save their son. Gold then explains to Belle that his mother lives in another realm, filled with darkness, where time runs differently, and "anything is possible". The hooded figure then enters Mr Gold's shop, revealing himself to be none other than a grown up Gideon.

=== In the Wish Realm ===
In an alternate version of the Enchanted Forest in which the Dark Curse never happened, Emma is living the life of a princess as she is celebrating her birthday with the kingdom, including her parents and Henry, and her memory has been altered so that she does not remember her life in the Land Without Magic and she is now meek and unwilling to fight back. Emma soon finds the sword destined to kill her, and she asks Wish Realm Snow and Wish Realm David about it, when Wish Realm Henry stumbles upon the scene and takes the sword, in preparation for his knighthood. Regina soon arrives, and discovers that she is still regarded as evil, after the Dwarves flee from her. Regina then comes across a statue of Snow White and Prince Charming, which marks the location where they defeated the Evil Queen in this Realm. Regina soon discovers Emma, and tries to tell her about the real Storybrooke, but Wish Realm Snow and Wish Realm David, alerted by the dwarves to her presence, begin to threaten Regina, and refuse to listen to her. Regina teleports to her now dilapidated castle, and then comes across a prison cell that is holding Wish Realm Rumplestiltskin, who still calls her his “greatest student and failure," as in this realm, Regina failed to cast the Dark Curse. However, Wish Realm Rumple offers Regina a deal in exchange for his freedom, telling Regina that Emma's destiny as the Savior can be awakened if Regina scares Emma into assuming the role of the Savior. As he is freed, he tells Regina to meet him at the lake the next day, where he will give her a Magic Bean so she can return to Storybrooke. Regina soon dresses up as the Evil Queen in order to unleash the Savior within Emma.

At the ceremony of Wish Realm Henry's ascension to knighthood, Regina shows up, reminiscent of her threat at Snow and Charming's wedding in the Enchanted Forest before the first curse, and kidnaps Wish Realm Snow and Wish Realm David in order to force Emma to save them. Emma shows up at Regina's castle, but instead of fighting Regina, she offers Regina the key to her kingdom, much to her dismay, and begins to break down in tears. Regina, in hoping to unleash the real Emma, crushes Wish Realm Snow and Wish Realm David's hearts, making Emma sob even harder. Suddenly, Wish Realm Henry appears, ready to kill Regina. Regina refuses to attack him, and almost lets herself die by his hand. Emma suddenly freezes Wish Realm Henry with a sword in mid-air, and she remembers her true life, catalyzed by Regina's refusal to kill Henry and him having been about to kill her and in doing so become everything Emma never wanted him to be: a murderer. The women then meet up with Wish Realm Rumple and he gives them the magic bean, as they open a portal back to Storybrooke. Before they can leave, they are held at arrow-point by Wish Realm Robin Hood, meaning to rob them, and Regina is transfixed by his presence, leaving the portal to close and both Emma and Regina trapped.

== Cultural references ==
- Emma hums "Someday My Prince Will Come" from Snow White and the Seven Dwarfs. The scene where Emma is picking flowers is also likely a reference to this film.
- Emma wishes on a candle shaped like a blue star, an allusion to the scene in Pinocchio, in which Geppetto wishes on a blue star and his wish is granted by the Blue Fairy. It is also a reference to the pilot episode.
- The Evil Queen references Sleeping Beauty by referring to the victims of her curse as "Sleeping Beauty" or "Sleeping Daddy."

== Production notes ==
- Rebecca Mader is credited but not featured in this episode.
- Sean Maguire appears in this episode, but is not credited.

== Reception ==
=== Ratings ===
The episode is among the lowest rated episodes of the series, placing a 0.9/3 rating among 18-49s with 3.25 million viewers tuning in.

=== Reviews ===
- Christine Laskodi of TV Fantic gave the episode a mild review: 3.5 out of 5.0
- Entertainment Weekly gave the episode an A.
- Other reviews were more critical, criticizing the fanfiction-like nature of the episode, the predictability of the plot twists, and the repetition of familiar tropes.
