= Dark Waters (Once Upon a Time) =

- Once Upon a Time episode
- Killian "Hook" Jones (right) played by Colin O'Donoghue
- Episode no.: Season 6 Episode 6
- Directed by: Robert Duncan
- Written by: Andrew Chambliss & Bridgette Hales
- Production code: 606
- Original air date: October 30, 2016

Guest appearances
- Deniz Akdeniz as Aladdin; Karen David as Shirin/Princess Jasmine; Nick Eversman as First Mate/Liam Jones II; Faran Tahir as Captain Nemo

Episode chronology
← Previous "Street Rats"	Next → "Heartless"
- Once Upon a Time season 6

"Dark Waters" is the sixth episode of the sixth season of the American fantasy drama series Once Upon a Time, which aired on October 30, 2016.

In this episode, Hook's past encounter with Captain Nemo is revealed, as the Evil Queen drives a wedge into Henry and Hook while she and Zelena attempt to stop Snow and David from finding Archie, and Emma suddenly learns the fate to Jasmine's kingdom from Aladdin.

== Plot ==
=== Opening sequence ===
A giant squid, called a Kraken, is featured in the forest.

=== Event chronology ===
The Enchanted Forest events take place at the time of the first Dark Curse, after Emma decided to stay in Storybrooke in "Pilot" (which is when time started moving again in the Enchanted Forest, according to "Broken") and before the curse is broken in "A Land Without Magic". The Storybrooke events take place after "Street Rats".

=== In the Characters' Past ===
The first scene is during the period of the first Dark Curse after Emma settled in Storybrooke, when time started moving again. Hook is yelling at his crew on the Jolly Roger when he is soon confronted by an unknown man who snuck aboard the vessel. But just as Hook is about to kill the unwanted guest, a Submarine appears, and the mysterious man pushes Hook into the ocean, jumping in after him. Hook then wakes up aboard the Nautilus and meets the stowaway, revealed to be Captain Nemo, who wants Hook to help out with a mission and shows him an enchanted spear blade to make a point. Nemo is aware of Hook's vengeance as he also once wanted revenge, but once he achieved it, he realized its meaninglessness and tries to persuade Hook to find something more important than vengeance, like a family. Inside the caverns, Hook and Nemo search the area and makes friends with a crewman who tells Hook that he also once wanted revenge on the person who killed his family until Nemo adopted him and taught him to accept a new family. Out of nowhere a giant squid attacks Hook upon reaching the location and Nemo uses the spear on the squid, allowing the crewman to save Hook.

As Nemo opens the treasure chest, he reveals a key to the gateway of the "Mysterious Island," where they can each start a new life that is devoid of loss. During their conversation, Hook recognizes a blade on Nemo’s desk, causing him to inquire about the crewman, and discovered that it belonged to his half-brother Liam, who is revealed to be the person that accompanied Hook and Nemo. As Hook decides to leave so he won't have to face Liam for killing their father, Nemo tries to stop him, but Liam discovers the truth and tries to stab Hook, his desire for vengeance returning. However, Nemo takes the hit and Hook escapes off the ship, as Liam is mortified. Nemo is able to survive, but only by going to the Mysterious Island, where his life is paused.

=== In Storybrooke ===
In the present day, Regina stands outside of Zelena’s house calling out the Evil Queen, and gets her and Zelena's attention, unaware that it was a ploy to free Archie (still in his cricket form), and succeeds. When Zelena and the Evil Queen hear Robin crying, they are given a warning from Regina, Snow, and David, and disappear.

At Granny's, Aladdin, who no longer sees himself as The Savior, is being convinced by Jasmine to help save Agrabah. When he leaves, she calls Emma for help. Emma kidnaps Aladdin after finding him trying to steal a car, bringing him to the city line to show him the crack in the sign left when she crashed her car there while trying to leave. She tells him that like him, she has run from her duty as the Savior many times, but always came back to it because it was right, prompting Aladdin to open up to Emma about what happened in Agrabah. Emma encourages Aladdin to own his responsibilities. When they return, Aladdin apologizes to Jasmine, who tells him the kingdom disappeared after he left.

While Emma takes Aladdin away, Henry, who was at home with Killian, goes outside to take out the trash, and the Evil Queen appears to tell Henry that Killian has kept the Fates’ Shears inside a box instead of burying them as he told Emma. When Killian leaves the house to look for Henry, he realizes that Henry knows the truth. He then heads to the docks to stop Henry from throwing the Shears into the ocean. As Henry becomes furious with Killian over why he lied to Emma, out of nowhere crewmen from the Nautilus take Hook and Henry hostage and bring them to the submarine. On board as prisoners, Killian opens up to Henry about how he killed his father, after he abandoned him and Liam, and later learning his father remarried and also had a new son, which Killian tells Henry it was too much for him to handle. As the two find a way to escape, they can find only one suit for escape, so Killian insists Henry use it to alert Emma. After Henry escapes, Killian is suddenly confronted by his half-brother Liam, who explains that Hyde took Nemo to the Mysterious Island which is revealed to be the Land of Untold Stories. Henry, realizing that Killian is family and that he must help, returns to distract Liam, allowing Killian to knock his brother unconscious.

While on patrol, David finds a man who has been gravely injured. He rushes him to the hospital where Snow is waiting for him. As the man is rushed into emergency surgery, Snow and David realize that he must be the latest arrival. Snow helps Belle in the waiting room get ready for her first ultrasound without Gold, who caught on to the Evil Queen's deception involving the Shears (of Destiny, as Gold called it), which he wanted to acquire to change the destiny of his unborn child, but she lies saying they're gone. Later on, Killian visits Liam at the hospital where he explains that he is no longer the man Liam knew. Liam and Killian reconcile. Just as Liam laments that Nemo didn't get to witness their reconciliation, the mystery patient is wheeled in. It's Captain Nemo. Killian explains that after he was found, he was successfully treated. Nemo and Liam share an emotional reunion. Killian comes clean to Emma about the Shears and that he and Henry disposed of them for good and she forgives him. Belle later drops a picture of the ultrasound at the door of the Pawn Shop as The Evil Queen visits and seduces Gold, but doesn't walk in. The Evil Queen then shows Gold the Shears she just retrieved from the ocean after having told Henry earlier that she didn't want them, and proposes a plan with Gold's help, which is to take Snow's heart.

== Cultural references ==
The Land of Untold Stories is revealed to be the Mysterious Island from the book as the same name.

The Nautilus is based on the submarine from Twenty Thousand Leagues Under the Seas.

Captain Nemo based on the protagonist from Jules Verne's 1870 novel Twenty Thousand Leagues Under the Seas.

Hook refers to the giant squid that attacks him as a kraken. The kraken is a legendary sea monster of giant size that is said to dwell off the coasts of Norway and Greenland.

== Production ==
- Although he was supposed to be featured in the episode, Raphael Sbarge did not appear.

== Reception ==
=== Ratings ===
The episode posted its lowest numbers so far in the series, as it placed a 0.9/3 rating among 18-49s with 3.04 million viewers tuning in. The drop was due to the competition from both the 2016 World Series on FOX (the night's top rated program) and Sunday Night Football on NBC.

=== Reviews ===
- Christine Laskodi of TV Fantic gave the episode a mild review: 3.5 out of 5.0
- Entertainment Weekly gave the episode a B−.
