= Changelings (Once Upon a Time) =

- Once Upon a Time episode
- Episode no.: Season 6 Episode 9
- Directed by: Mairzee Almas
- Written by: David H. Goodman & Brian Ridings
- Production code: 609
- Original air date: November 27, 2016

Guest appearances
- Deniz Akdeniz as Aladdin; Karen David as Jasmine; Beverley Elliott as Granny; Giles Matthey as Morpheus/Gideon; Jaime Murray as Black Fairy; Keegan Connor Tracy as Blue Fairy/Mother Superior

Episode chronology
| ← Previous "I'll Be Your Mirror" | Next → "Wish You Were Here" |
- Once Upon a Time season 6

"Changelings" is the ninth episode of the sixth season of the American fantasy drama series Once Upon a Time, which aired on November 27, 2016. In this episode, Belle's pregnancy is sped up, and Aladdin becomes a genie. In flashbacks, Rumpelstiltskin confronts his mother, the Black Fairy, for abandoning him.

== Plot ==
=== Opening sequence ===
A swing set from the Dream World is featured in the forest.

=== In the characters' past ===
At Rumplestiltskin's castle, Belle is stunned to see Rumplestiltskin bring a child back with him, but as she asks questions, he makes her stop before he leaves again. While reading "Her Handsome Hero" Belle calms the baby down as she plots to track down the parents. Belle enters his secret room and deciphers a scroll with an incantation, but Rumple finds her, locks Belle in the room and disappears with the baby. She is then rescued by The Blue Fairy, who enlists Belle to save the child before he can use it as a way to seek revenge on The Black Fairy, who, like Rumple, is known to take children.

That night in the forest, with the incantation, Rumple summons the Black Fairy and throws squid ink on her to paralyze her. When she warns him that the squid ink won't hold her for long, he tells her that his ability to kill her with his Dagger would compel her to stay. He questions her about abandoning babies, and why she abandoned her own child, and she suddenly realizes that the baby he is referring to was Rumplestiltskin himself, as it turns out that he is her son. Though shocked, she recovers and tells him that she abandoned him because "sometimes, you have to choose power over love." Moments later, Belle shows up to rescue the baby, and the Black Fairy overcomes the effects of the squid ink, and leaves Rumplestiltskin guessing about why she really abandoned him. Afterwards, Belle returns the baby to its parents, as Rumplestiltskin watches, observing the happiness of a family that he never had.

=== In Storybrooke ===
In the present day at an undisclosed location, Gold chases down and captures a nun, and the Evil Queen has shown up to witness what he planned to do to her, as she is aware of his hatred towards fairies. As Gold reminds the Evil Queen that she is supposed to kill Zelena on his behalf, he proceeds to toss magical dust on the fairy, causing her to age immediately, which he wants to serve as a message to the fairies. This has Belle more worried after seeing the aged nun and knowing that he'll use everything to take their child away. While doing research on how to stop Gold, Belle comes across a "Manual on Defeating the Dark One" book and as she opens it; a red string appears on the floor that matches the page on the book. She follows it to her son, who tells her the answer was in front of her. She suddenly wakes up on top of the book, realizing that she was dreaming while searching for the answer.

In the meantime, Jasmine tells Snow that she is nervous about the lamp, assuming that a genie's magic could help her find Agrabah, but fears what the genie will want in return. She decides to summon the genie anyway, but when she rubs the lamp, all that comes out are two cuffs, implying that the genie was freed. Aladdin then puts the cuffs on, turning himself into a genie instead. Around the same time, the Evil Queen confronts Zelena and is ready to kill her, but she is stopped by Regina, who squeezes her own heart. Since both are connected, whatever happens to one also affects the other. During Regina's confrontation with the Evil Queen, in an effort to save Zelena, Regina tells the Evil Queen that Gold is using her. Since Regina cannot kill the Evil Queen because she would also die, she allows the Evil Queen to get away. Despite saving Zelena's life, Regina continues to blame her for Robin's death and tells Zelena she cannot forgive her.

The book that Belle slept on captures the attention of Hook as the book is written in Squid ink, and suggests that he and Emma take care of the situation. When they arrive to the Pawn Shop, Hook provokes Gold's anger to allow Emma to use the ink on him. As they are searching the shop, Emma sees the sword from her visions and has a vision upon touching the sword, resulting in her hands shaking again. When Hook & Emma check on Gold, they realize he escaped the squid ink. Gold, ready to confront Belle with the aging dust, tells her that he thinks their son may be the only person who could ever love him and is willing to do anything to steal their child from her. However, Gold starts having second thoughts after Belle tells him that he might also lose her forever.

At Granny's, Belle, Emma, and Hook have a conversation. As Emma tells Hook that a new vision involving her death has appeared, Belle drops her mug on the ground, revealing that the tea she was drinking had a potion that causes her pregnancy to accelerate and she goes into labor. As Emma and the fairies help Belle deliver, she finds herself again in the dream world talking to her son, who gives his mother a message, “you know what you must do." As Belle successfully delivers the baby, she asks Mother Superior to make a request to be his fairy godmother and to take him far away from Storybrooke, where he will be safe from Gold. Belle then names her son Gideon, in honor of her favorite book hero before Mother Superior sends the child away. The nuns/fairies & Emma had placed a protection on the nunnery to prevent Gold from entering until the baby was delivered. Thus Gold enters after the Blue Fairy/Mother Superior has already taken his son. Belle refuses to tell Gold their son's name, but he vows to find him regardless.

When Gold returns to his shop, the Evil Queen is waiting and tells him that she is responsible for placing the spell in Belle's tea that resulted in her pregnancy to accelerate. The Evil Queen tells Gold that he just “made an enemy” of her, but he counters that she is merely a pawn in his game and vows to get even, but not before she leaves with a message about the way "Fairies make great mothers" (now that she knows that The Black Fairy is Gold's mother), then he throws everything to the ground. Finally, after Hook tells her that Regina reversed the aging spell on the nun, Emma tells Hook that she feels stronger than ever, ready to confront her vision, returned to the shop, where she finds the sword that will kill her in her vision and takes it.

== Cultural references ==
- The episode's name "Changelings" refers to the myth of fairies abducting children and replacing them with "changelings" or "faerie-babies."
- A changeling is a creature found in folklore and folk religion. A changeling was believed to be a black fairy that had been left in place of a human child stolen by the fairies.
- A Celtic cross is seen in Belle's Dream World.

== Production notes ==
Josh Dallas is credited but not featured in this episode.

== Reception ==
=== Ratings ===
The episode saw an improvement from the previous outing, placing a 1.0/3 rating among 18-49s with 3.28 million viewers tuning in.

=== Reviews ===
- Christine Laskodi of TV Fantic gave the episode a mild review: 3.5 out of 5.0
- Entertainment Weekly gave the episode a B.
