= Tougher Than the Rest (Once Upon a Time) =

- Once Upon a Time episode
- Episode no.: Season 6 Episode 11
- Directed by: Billy Gierhart
- Written by: Edward Kitsis & Adam Horowitz
- Production code: 611
- Original air date: March 5, 2017

Guest appearances
- Eion Bailey as August Booth/Pinocchio; Sean Maguire as Robin of Locksley; Giles Matthey as Morpheus/Gideon; Wil Traval as Sheriff of Nottingham; Mckenna Grace as Young Emma Swan

Episode chronology
← Previous "Wish You Were Here"	Next → "Murder Most Foul"
- Once Upon a Time season 6

"Tougher Than the Rest" is the eleventh episode of the sixth season of the American fantasy drama series Once Upon a Time, which aired on March 5, 2017. In this episode, Emma must find a way to escape the Wish realm as she tries to convince Regina that Robin Hood is part of the universe, while David takes matters into his own hands when Gideon arrives, thus making matters disturbing for Gold and Belle.

== Plot ==
=== Opening sequence ===
A enchanted tree from the Wish realm is featured in the forest.

=== Event chronology ===
The Land Without Magic flashbacks take place during winter 1990, one year after the flashback of "The Dark Swan", and a few years before "Snow Drifts". The Dark Realm flashbacks take place many years after the Black Fairy kidnapped Gideon in "Wish You Were Here". The Wish Realm and Storybrooke events take place after "Wish You Were Here." The events during the Wish Realm in this episode would result in the events that would later take place in "Homecoming."

=== In the Characters' Past ===
In winter 1990 Minnesota, a young Emma has run away from a group home and is living on the streets of Minneapolis. While she is tearing pages out of a fairy tale book to keep her warm, a teenage boy approaches her and stops Emma from tearing the pages. He then shows her a story from the book - The Golden Age Compendium of Children's Fairy Tales - "The Ugly Duckling", to tell her that out of the bad things that she sees around her that great things will come her way. Emma agrees to return to the group home, and tells the woman who took her in that her last name was Swan.

=== In the Wish Realm ===
After they miss the opportunity to escape back to Storybrooke, Emma and Regina are forced to hand over their items to Robin, whom Regina believes is real although Emma says otherwise. When they hear horses coming, Robin escapes but Emma and Regina are now hiding from Prince Henry, who believes Regina is still the Evil Queen. Afterwards, Emma comes across Pinocchio, and after explaining that they're from another realm, they come up with a plan to build a magical portal called "magical wardrobe" so they can return home. Regina, on the other hand, decides to find out about the Wish realm Robin, and she tracks him down to his tavern. While there, she asks Robin if he would’ve been better off if she had never pursued him, only to have their conversation be interrupted by the Sheriff of Nottingham, who places them in jail. Regina discovers that Marian in this realm has died and Robin is unhappy; in this realm, Robin is a wanted thief as he keeps everything he steals instead of giving it to the poor. Suddenly the Wish realm Rumplestiltskin arrives and frees them, but instead of Rumplestiltskin returning the favor for freeing her after she did the same for him, Regina finds herself in Rumplestiltskin's custody, because in this realm she had Belle killed. Regina tells Robin that where she comes from the real Robin was murdered. Robin agrees to help Regina escape and they do.

Meanwhile, Emma and Pinocchio start working on the ingredients needed to create the portal, when they come across a Wish realm version of Hook, except this one is an alcoholic and wants to start fights. As Emma uses her magic to send him back to his ship, Hook accidentally breaks one of Pinocchio’s magical tools. Pinocchio gives Emma a present, which turns out to be a wooden figure of a swan, similar to the one Emma saw in “The Ugly Duckling" in the flashback, and she learns that he is the teenager who convinced her to return to the group home in the real realm. Pinocchio wanted Emma to know that because of him inspiring her, Emma has inspired him now to embrace the magic within. After Pinocchio finishes the portal, Emma and Regina are ready, with the latter bringing Robin with her. As Robin gives Regina a feather similar to the one the real Robin was about to give her before he died, Regina believes that the real Robin's spirit still lives on in this Robin. The threesome enter the portal and return to Storybrooke.

=== In Storybrooke ===
At the Pawn Shop, Gideon explains to Belle and Gold about how he was raised by the Black Fairy, but he resisted turning evil on his own will, although he still plans to kill Emma, because her powers as a Savior are the only way to kill his grandmother, and he wants to defeat her. Hours later in the woods, Gold meets with Gideon to offer his help, but Gideon refuses upon being provoked by Gold to attack him. At the loft, David, who by now is frustrated and even has Hook worried while looking for their unwanted visitor earlier, explains to Snow (via cellphone as she is still under the shared sleeping curse) that until the threat is over he won't wake her up. Belle shows up at the loft to tell David about Gideon being the one who'll kill Emma, and she is hoping they can come up with a plan to stop it.

As Emma returns to Storybrooke, the vision is about to be played out, and as expected is suddenly approached by Gideon; the two start their sword fight. Gideon eventually manages to knock Emma's sword from her grasp and into the air, catching it, before teleporting his original sword away. Emma’s family and friends arrive to stop them, but Gideon freezes them, so they can't interfere. Emma gains the upper hand when she regains confidence in herself, gaining control of her shaking hand, and releasing a burst of light magic that sends Gideon into the air, shattering the sword. Emma grabs a fragment of the sword's blade while Gideon is still stunned, and she places the sword at his throat, only to have Gideon (at the request of Gold not to kill him) end the battle by disappearing, until they meet again. Hours later, Emma meets up with August to ask him about their past encounter in Minnesota and discovers that he was keeping tabs on her to keep her safe; both work on a plan that could change Emma's destiny with August adding a new chapter to the storybook. Meanwhile, Gold tells Belle that he doesn't want Gideon killing Emma, or darkening his soul, and the two agree to help their son, who, in the wake of his defeated battle with Emma, takes out his frustrations by destroying the face of the clock tower.

== Production ==
Rebecca Mader is credited but does not appear in this episode. Jaime Murray and Rose McIver appeared in flashback clips but are not credited in this episode.

=== Title ===
The episode is named after the Bruce Springsteen song of the same name from the rock star's 1987 album Tunnel of Love, of whom Adam Horowitz is a fan.

== Reception ==
=== Ratings ===
The midseason return posted a 0.9 among 18-49s with 3.02 million viewers tuning in, slightly down from the previous episode.

=== Reviews ===
- Christine Laskodi of TV Fantic gave the episode a good review: 4.7 out of 5.0
- Entertainment Weekly gave the episode a B+.
