= I'll Be Your Mirror (Once Upon a Time) =

- Once Upon a Time episode
- Episode no.: Season 6 Episode 8
- Directed by: Jennifer Lynch
- Written by: Jerome Schwartz & Leah Fong
- Production code: 608
- Original air date: November 13, 2016

Guest appearances
- Deniz Akdeniz as Aladdin; Karen David as Princess Jasmine; Beverley Elliott as Granny; Tzi Ma as the Dragon; Olivia Steele Falconer as Violet

Episode chronology
← Previous "Heartless"	Next → "Changelings"
- Once Upon a Time season 6

"I'll Be Your Mirror" is the eighth episode of the sixth season of the American fantasy drama series Once Upon a Time, which aired on November 13, 2016.

In this episode, the Evil Queen traps Emma and Regina in another world while she uses a plot to manipulate Henry as he prepares to ask Violet out for a date, Snow and David try to deal with the curse placed on them, and Belle and Zelena enlists Aladdin and Jasmine to help retrieve an item from Gold.

== Plot ==
=== Opening sequence ===
The forest is filled with mirrors, with the "O" mirror: The World Behind the Mirror showing off the blue mist.

=== Event chronology ===
The World Behind the Mirror events take place after Sidney Glass is freed from the Mirror by Ingrid in "Breaking Glass". The Storybrooke events take place after "Heartless".

=== In Storybrooke ===
In the present day, Snow and David deal with living without each other as long as their hearts are cursed, leaving one in sleep and the other awake. Snow is aware that The Evil Queen is watching, leading to Snow smashing a mirror. Unfortunately at this point there is nothing that even Emma, Henry, or Regina can do, but they believe that The Dragon might be their answer to stopping The Evil Queen. With no luck finding The Dragon, Regina comes up with a solution, which is using a mirror to trap her other half. At the beach, Henry, acting as bait, confronts The Evil Queen and tells her that he won't forget what she did to his grandparents. After they send him away, Emma and Regina appear ready to send The Evil Queen to another world through the Mirror, but The Evil Queen, who shares the same mind as Regina, has the real mirror and sends Regina and Emma to the other side, then breaks the mirror to keep the women trapped inside.

Meanwhile, Belle enlists Zelena's help to break into Gold's Pawn Shop so she can escape Storybrooke. Zelena isn't interested in helping her but Belle says they both know what it's like to care about people who let them down. Realizing that Zelena needs the Sorcerer's wand, Belle and Zelena go talk Aladdin and Jasmine into helping them. Although Jasmine says it's not Aladdin's business to be involved, Zelena says it's his fault because, thanks to Aladdin, Gold has now acquired the Fates shears. At the same time Gold catches on to The Evil Queen masquerading as Regina, and refused her advances. The Evil Queen then asks Gold for an item called the hammer of Hephaestus, which gives magic to those without it, explaining that she wants it for Henry. As he gives the hammer to the Evil Queen, Gold asks what she has to offer him, only to point out they're on the same team, as he pushes her away. The disappearance of Emma has Hook suspicious. When he investigates and finds Emma's phone on the beach, he is attacked by The Evil Queen.

At Granny's, Henry sits alone at a table, waiting for Violet, then looks in the mirror to see his appearance. As both Emma and Regina see Henry, they almost get his attention until they see The Evil Queen (pretending to be Regina) show up. Henry tells the fake Regina that he doesn't think he's good enough for Violet, but she tells Henry he's a prince and should act like one. After Henry glances at her carefully, Violet shows up and Henry walks over and hands her the flower that "Regina" gave him. He then tells Violet that he knows "Regina" is really The Evil Queen after she "lectures" about his posture, which he knows is The Evil Queen's recurring theme. Using a ruse to help Henry search for Emma and Regina, Violet makes an excuse about needing to change and they leave. Henry arrives at the vault to contact the mirror when The Evil Queen shows up, knowing that he is aware of her plan. The Evil Queen then tempts Henry to become part of her future, but when he refuses, The Evil Queen takes out the Dragon's heart and uses it to turn the Dragon into a dragon in front of Emma and Regina to kill them. The Evil Queen then tempts Henry to kill The Dragon with the Hammer but he defies her and uses the Hammer to smash the mirror and free Emma and Regina from the World Behind the Mirror. After they're released, The Evil Queen is stunned by Henry standing up for himself, but as she initiates a spell to use on them, Hook stops her, but she vows her revenge. Later that night, Henry and Violet finally have their dance as Emma and Regina watch.

In between the events, Aladdin breaks into Gold's shop looking for the wand. He finds Gold at the spinning wheel spinning gold, and is quick to hide from him, allowing Aladdin to find the wand, and later on, show Jasmine the lamp, where he hopes to find out who took the Genie's place. Unfortunately for Belle and Zelena, they aren't as lucky; Gold takes back the wand from Zelena, then uses the gold bracelet he spun at the shop to place on Belle so he can track her, However, Gold forgets he can't hurt Zelena because their hearts are connected. Later on back at the shop, both Gold and The Evil Queen, upset over their latest defeats, agree to team up to seek vengeance, and as they have more tepid kissing, Gold asks The Evil Queen to help him kill the one thing that stands in his way: Zelena.

=== In The World Behind The Mirror ===
Inside the trapped universe, Emma looks for Regina and discovers that she can see Storybrooke through the mirror but nobody can hear them. Regina comes to and believes that the person who can reach them is Henry. However, The Evil Queen has taken Regina's place in Storybrooke, by fooling Henry to let him think that The Evil Queen was banished. Emma and Regina begin to look for Henry through the mirrors, and then locate him after Emma remembers Henry will be at Granny's to meet Violet. As both Emma and Regina see Henry, they almost get his attention until they see The Evil Queen (pretending to be Regina) show up, Regina is worried and says Henry doesn't stand a chance against her. Suddenly, the women are shocked to see The Dragon inside with them as a prisoner as well. He tells Regina that she was never supposed to let the Evil Queen out, and that caused his imprisonment, and he tells Regina she needs balance. He tells her that he has also made mistakes, such as losing his daughter. He says he has found a back door out of the mirror world. En route, the Dragon leads the women to the place where Sidney lived as the Magic Mirror, and tells them he was putting together a way to repair the portal, and that he can't break Emma's parents' curse. As they work on the portal, Henry arrives to the vault to contact the mirror when The Evil Queen shows up, now that he is aware of her plan. The Evil Queen then tempts Henry to become part of her future, but when he refuses, the Evil Queen takes out the Dragon's heart and uses it to turn the Dragon into a dragon in front of Emma and Regina to kill them. The Evil Queen then tempts Henry to kill The Dragon with the Hammer but he defies her and uses the Hammer to smash the mirror instead, freeing Emma and Regina from the World Behind the Mirror.

== Cultural references ==
- The cymbal banging monkey toy Aladdin discovers in Gold's shop refers to Abu from the 1992 Disney film Aladdin, who was transformed into one by Jafar.
- Aladdin's description of his genie's having been freed and is now gone was a reference to Robin Williams, who portrayed the Genie in the 1992 film.
- The hammer of Hephaestus is derived from Greek mythology.

== Reception ==
=== Ratings ===
The episode saw a decrease from the previous outing, posting a 0.9/3 among 18-49s, with 3.37 million viewers tuning in.

=== Reviews ===
- Christine Laskodi of TV Fantic gave the episode a mild review: 3.75 out of 5.0
- Entertainment Weekly gave the episode a B−.
