= Street Rats (Once Upon a Time) =

- Once Upon a Time episode
- Episode no.: Season 6 Episode 5
- Directed by: Norman Buckley
- Written by: Edward Kitsis; Adam Horowitz
- Production code: 605
- Original air date: October 23, 2016

Guest appearances
- Deniz Akdeniz as Aladdin; Karen David as Shirin / Jasmine; Oded Fehr as Jafar; Raphael Sbarge as Archie Hopper

Episode chronology
← Previous "Strange Case"	Next → "Dark Waters"
- Once Upon a Time season 6

"Street Rats" is the fifth episode of the sixth season of the American fantasy drama series Once Upon a Time, which aired on October 23, 2016.

In this episode, Jasmine recruits Aladdin to help save her kingdom from Jafar's grip, while in Storybrooke Zelena is pampered by the Evil Queen, who is plotting to trick Hook and The Charmings, forcing Emma to come clean as they discover the truth about Jasmine and her search for Aladdin.

== Plot ==
=== Opening sequence ===
The hourglass is featured in the forest.

=== Event chronology ===
The Agrabah events take place after "The Serpent" and before "The Savior". The Storybrooke events take place after "Strange Case".

=== In the Characters' Past ===
"Many years ago" in the capital of Agrabah, Jafar is lecturing the common people about theft, and proves to them that it will not be tolerated, by turning the ones he suspects of thievery into street rats. At the same time, Aladdin, who has managed to outsmart Jafar so far but is reluctant to fight against him, is recruited by Jasmine to help steal a powerful and magical weapon in the world called "the Diamond in the Rough". While en route to the Cave of Wonders, which is where the weapon is located based on the books Jasmine has with her, both Jasmine and Aladdin are bickering over the claims until they reach the location, where upon their arrival, Aladdin yells "open sesame", and opens the cave. As the two enter, they discover the gem balancing on a sword. Taking no chances as they believe the item to be cursed, Aladdin replaces the gem's weight with another object, when a crumbling column falls on them. Suddenly, Aladdin conjures magic to save them both, and Jasmine soon discovers that Aladdin was the Diamond in the Rough all along.

Later on, after Jasmine gives Aladdin a gift, which is a scarab that represents heroism, Jafar appears to show Aladdin his future by using the red bird, revealed to be the "Oracle" to show Aladdin that he will face an untimely death, and there is one way to alter his destiny, with a pair of golden shears that once belonged to the Fates and go back to living a normal life as a rich man. However, it turns out that Jafar has deceived Aladdin. When Jasmine returns to seek help from her father, he is already under Jafar's command, as Jafar arrives and places Jasmine in his hourglass prison. Aladdin saves the day by flying into the castle on a magic carpet, and begins his new destiny as The Savior. However, when Aladdin later asks Jasmine to run away with him and help him fight Jafar, she turns him down, saying she wants to defend her kingdom.

=== In Storybrooke ===
In the present day, Emma and Archie follow the red bird that leads to the Oracle, but they're too late and they find her dead body, and when they see Shirin escape they catch her. She is taken to the Sheriff's station, where during an interrogation Shirin reveals herself to be Jasmine. Emma, Snow, and David immediately believe in her innocence, until Jasmine shocks them when she refers to Aladdin as "the Savior". When Archie gets back to his office, the Evil Queen is waiting, ready to take advantage of The Oracle's death to manipulate Emma. When Archie refuses to help her, she ties up Archie and transforms into a lookalike Archie, sending the real one to Zelena's house. The "Fake" Archie (Evil Queen in disguise) then chats with Emma, who believes there is hope for her yet. As The Evil Queen continues her role as Archie, she confronts Emma in front of her family and implores her to tell them about her secret visions, before "he" leaves and turns back into the Evil Queen. Emma's family are angry with her for not telling the truth to them.

While the family started wondering where the real Archie went, he was at Zelena's, watching the baby while she and The Evil Queen went to the spa and catch up on the bonding with the Evil Queen convincing Zelena that she can embrace her wickedness without losing her daughter, as she admits to having lied to Henry about caring for him as a son. When they return home, Zelena turns Archie into a cricket once again, putting him in a cage that hangs above her baby's crib.

Later on, Regina makes a potion that links the magic of two Saviors, and once Emma drinks it, she will be able to track Aladdin. They follow his traces to a cemetery crypt, where Jasmine is devastated to find the scarab, believing Aladdin had died and Emma worried about her fate. When Emma and Henry have a conversation about what the future holds for them, Aladdin appears out of hiding, admitting that he used the scarab to throw them off, but heard them talk so he changed his mind. Aladdin explains that he ended up using the shears that ultimately doomed Agrabah. He gives the shears to Emma, letting her choose if she wants to use them someday. Emma and Henry then convince Aladdin to go back to Jasmine, but the reunion is cut short when Jasmine explains that she needs his help to defend Agrabah again, only to have Aladdin try to explain his reason why he might not. As for the fate shears, Emma gives them to Hook, who plans to bury them "20,000 Leagues under the sea." Unfortunately, after Emma kissed him as she is about to order dinner, Hook lied to her as he kept the fate shears inside his jacket.

== Cultural references ==
- The Fates are derived from the Moirai from Greek mythology. They also bear a similarity to the Norns from Norse mythology.

== Production ==
- Both Robert Carlyle and Emilie de Ravin are credited in this episode, but do not appear.
- The Sultan (Cedric de Souza) shown in the episode is not the same Sultan featured in Once Upon a Time in Wonderland. Both Sultans are rulers of different cities within Agrabah.

== Reception ==
=== Ratings ===
The episode saw a decrease from the previous outing, posting a 1.0/3 among 18-49s with 3.35 million viewers tuning in.

=== Reviews ===
- Christine Laskodi of TV Fantic gave the episode a mild review: 3.5 out of 5.0
- Justin Kirkland of Entertainment Weekly gave the episode a positive review.
