= A Bitter Draught =

- Once Upon a Time episode
- Episode no.: Season 6 Episode 2
- Directed by: Ron Underwood
- Written by: Andrew Chambliss & Dana Horgan
- Production code: 602
- Original air date: October 2, 2016

Guest appearances
- Lee Arenberg as Grumpy; Beverly Elliot as Granny; Craig Horner as Edmond Danteś/Count of Monte Cristo; Raphael Sbarge as Archie Hopper

Episode chronology
← Previous "The Savior"	Next → "The Other Shoe"
- Once Upon a Time season 6

"A Bitter Draught" is the second episode of the sixth season of the American fantasy drama series Once Upon a Time, which aired on October 2, 2016.

In this episode, when a mysterious person surfaces in Storybrooke to seek vengeance, Regina, David and Snow band together to stop him, Emma turns to Archie to find out why she continues to have visions of her future, The Evil Queen attempts to win Zelena over, and Hook agrees to help Belle protect her and unborn child from Gold. Flashbacks show The Count of Monte Cristo being hired by the Queen to kill Snow and Charming.

== Plot ==
=== Opening sequence ===
The Dark Palace is shown in the forest.

=== Event chronology ===
- The 19th Century France events takes place a few years after Edmond's imprisonment.
- The Enchanted Forest events take place during "The Cricket Game", after the Evil Queen's cancelled execution and before Snow White and Prince Charming's wedding day in "Pilot".
- The Storybrooke events take place after "The Savior".

=== In the Characters' Past ===
In 19th Century France, Edmond Dantès, also known as the Count of Monte Cristo, is hosting a ceremony at his palace. He then walks over to the person who locked him up ten years earlier, the Baron, and he kills him for revenge. Everyone flees except for the Evil Queen, who offers the Count a list of every person who has ever wronged him or his fiancée, for the sake of revenge, and in return she asks for help with revenge of her own. Later on the Enchanted Forest, Snow and David come across a ramsacked village with Snow White's handmaiden Charlotte and Grumpy. Here they encounter Edmond, who is pretending to be a lone survivor. He is in reality working with the Evil Queen, who wants him to poison Snow and David. Unfortunately, Rumplestiltskin shows up and warns The Queen that he placed a protection spell on the Charmings, but the Queen also placed a protection spell on Edmond so he won't be killed by Rumplestiltskin.

At the Charmings' palace, Edmond reluctantly goes through with the plan, but soon feels guilty when Snow’s handmaiden Charlotte joins them, prompting Edmond to back out of the plan to poison them. Later on, Rumplestiltskin appears to talk to Edmond, who admits that Charlotte reminds him of his fiancée, and decides to poison her, as Rumple cannot kill Edmond. However, the poison does not kill Charlotte immediately. Rumple convinces Edmond to take Charlotte with him and go to a different realm called the Land of Untold Stories, and promises him that as long as he and Charlotte stay there, the poison will not kill her. Edmond accepts the offer and leaves.

=== In Storybrooke ===
That night at the vault, The Evil Queen and Zelena entered the place despite the protection spell placed on it. Hoping that it will make Regina suffer, The Evil Queen tells Zelena that "She can never escape who she really is.” She then takes a box that will be useful in her plans. Later on the following night, The Evil Queen congratulated Zelena on not letting Regina know about her arrival in Storybrooke despite Zelena's mixed feelings.

Speaking of Regina, she visits Granny's the following day and helps the residents welcome the newcomers, when suddenly a person who is revealed to be Edmond shows up to give Henry a letter to hand to Snow and David. When Regina recognized who they were taking about, she tells Snow and David that she hired him to finish the job of killing them back in the Enchanted Forest. When they visit his room, they discovered an arsenal of weapons ready to use. At the wreckage in the forest, Regina confronted Edmond to call it off but he refuses, then pulls his sword to strike at Regina, only to have Regina use magic to stop it and he disappeared. At the same time Emma attempted to get Snow and David out of Storybrooke only to discover that someone placed a barrier on the city limits. When Regina discovers this, she asked Zelena about it but tells her sister she had nothing to do with it.

When Regina and Henry return to the wreckage, they encountered Charlotte's body and discovered that she was poisoned. The two are then confronted by the Evil Queen, who also weakened Regina's powers and revealed that she is controlling Edmond by using his heart to kill the Charmings. At the docks, Edmond shows up to fight Snow and David, and knocked them out after he tells them that the Evil Queen was alive. Just as he about finish them, Regina stops him and challenges Edmond to a sword fight. Regina is still weakened and Henry's phone is blocked by a spell after he gets the upper hand, when Regina throws the sword at Edmond and kills him. Suddenly The Evil Queen arrived to warn everyone that they all have untold stories and it's about to be played out and Regina will be the undoing, as she used Regina's psyche to kill Edmond. Later that night, everyone gathers at Granny's to come with a strategy to stop the threat.

Emma is taking some time out to see Archie about the visions she has been seeing and her tremors from her hand. Emma asked Archie about whether she should tell her family about this but is fretting to point of walking out of his therapy session. When she returned later on, she told Archie about the Evil Queen but then added that her visions are starting to suggest that the only family member who didn't show up in her vision was Regina and is not sure why.

With Belle returning to Storybrooke, she asks for a safe place to stay and get away from Gold, so she takes refuge on Hook's ship. Gold on the other hand, is confronted by the Evil Queen, who agrees not to harm Belle or the unborn baby in order to get what she wants, but tells Gold that Belle might not return to him by using a flirtatious gesture on him. Gold then gives a coin to The Evil Queen, who has something in mind for it. At the diner that night, David sees a note on the stool and opens to find the coin. He then walks out to find the Evil Queen ready to talk to him, saying that coin belonged to his late father, only to add that his father's death wasn't an accident.

== Reception ==
=== Ratings ===
The episode saw a slight decrease from the previous outing, with a 1.1/4 rating among 18-49s and 3.67 million viewers tuning in.

=== Reviews ===
Justin Kirkland of Entertainment Weekly gave the episode a positive review.
