= Strange Case =

- Once Upon a Time episode
- Episode no.: Season 6 Episode 4
- Directed by: Alrick Riley
- Written by: David H. Goodman and Nelson Soler
- Production code: 604
- Original air date: October 16, 2016

Guest appearances
- Lee Arenberg as Grumpy/Leroy; Jonny Coyne as Dr. Lydgate; Karen David as Jasmine/Shirin; Hank Harris as The Groundsman/Dr. Jekyll; Sam Witwer as The Warden/Mr. Hyde; Elizabeth Blackmore as Mary; Olivia Steele Falconer as Violet

Episode chronology
← Previous "The Other Shoe"	Next → "Street Rats"
- Once Upon a Time season 6

"Strange Case" is the fourth episode of the sixth season of the American fantasy drama series Once Upon a Time, which aired on October 16, 2016.

In this episode, the origins of Jekyll and Hyde with its ties to Rumplestiltskin are revealed, as Gold seeks vengeance to stop Hyde from threatening Belle, while Snow welcomes a new assistant who came from the Land of Untold Stories, who has an agenda of her own to deal with.

== Plot ==
=== Opening sequence ===
The Elizabeth Tower (known more commonly by the name of the bell it houses, Big Ben) is featured in the forest.

=== Event chronology ===
The Victorian England events take place at an unspecified time, years before Alice is released from the Bethlem Asylum in "Down the Rabbit Hole", this story also takes place after Belle becomes Rumplestiltskin's maid in "Skin Deep" and before Regina tells him Belle has committed suicide in the same episode. The Storybrooke events take place after "The Other Shoe".

=== In the Characters' Past ===
In Victorian England, Dr. Jekyll is joined by his friend Mary Lydgate, whose father, Dr. Lydgate, is a member of a prestigious science academy, as he hopes to convince him to back his project that he created, a serum that separates personalities, only to be rejected. The experiment would later attract the attention of Rumplestiltskin, who suddenly appears and helps Jekyll perfect the serum, and when Jekyll drinks it, he transforms into Hyde for the first time. That night at a party, Hyde, with the help of Rumplestiltskin, confronts Mary’s father and threatens to expose the truth about him sleeping with his lab assistant if he doesn’t grant Jekyll his membership into the academy. In the morning, Jekyll wakes up and remembers nothing but finds himself to be an academy member.

Later on, Rumplestiltskin influences Jekyll to become Hyde again, this time to win over Mary, revealing that Jekyll has strong feelings for her, but she admits that she isn’t interested in the same way and wants a man who wants to embrace passion without getting rid of it, and the two kiss. The following morning, Jekyll and Mary are waking up in bed together and are shocked by the outcome, as Jekyll tries to convince her that he is Hyde, but Mary is upset that Jekyll tricked her and tries to run away, prompting an angry Jekyll to push Mary out of the window and to her death. Realizing what he has done, Jekyll drinks the last of the serum and escapes as Hyde.

=== In Storybrooke ===
At the Pawn shop, Gold is looking in the mirror and sees his hair as he prepares to cut it, giving him a more crew cut appearance. He is soon visited by the Evil Queen and Hyde, who demanded a necklace. As Gold choked Hyde, he learned that he cannot be killed by The Evil Queen, although she tells Gold that their deal to protect Belle and the baby is still in effect. When news leaks of Hyde escaping the hospital, this suddenly disrupts the normally for David and Snow, as well as for Emma and Hook, who is ready to move in with her. When Regina and Jekyll shows off the necklace, they soon discover that the serum will be vital in defeating The Evil Queen and Hyde. With Hook having moved out of the Jolly Roger, he gave Belle a magical seashell to use as an emergency, but Gold later stopped by to ask Belle to offer her protection. After Belle refused, Gold placed a protection spell on the ship in order to prevent Belle from leaving and keep Hyde from entering. Later on, Regina asks Gold for help, only to discover the Evil Queen and Hyde have already destroyed the lab but Jekyll managed to save a tiny bit of the serum which Regina wants to use on the Evil Queen. Gold to steals Jekyll’s heart to convince Regina to hand over the serum which he then pours the serum onto his dagger which will be useful in killing Hyde. As Gold leaves, he tosses Jekyll’s heart back to Regina, who then sends him to the Jolly Roger to stay with Belle.

In the woods, David and Emma find Hyde, and this time he is ready as he overpowers them almost immediately, only to have Gold come out of nowhere and stabs him in the heart with the serum-covered dagger, but that fails as well, as Hyde tells Gold that he switched serums with Jekyll earlier, then takes the Dark One’s dagger and uses it to control Gold to take him to Belle. When the two appeared in front of the Jolly Roger, Hyde says that there is one final twist. It turns out that Jekyll is actually the ruthless one, as his aggressive behavior starts to worry Belle as she attempts to use the seashell to contact Hook but Jekyll breaks it, and her attempt to escape is prevented by the protection spell, and all Gold and Hyde can do is look on. Hook arrived just in time to save Belle by not only killing Jekyll, but also killing Hyde. Realizing that the same thing can happen because Jekyll and Hyde are still the same person, and therefore likewise with her and the Evil Queen, Regina ask Emma to "do what is necessary" to keep from returning to evil, while an angry Belle confronts Gold about his deal with Hyde. He reveals that, back when she was a slave in his castle, he was worried about the feelings he had for her. Gold sought out Jekyll to see if his serum could rid people of "weakness," but when his experiment failed, he angrily banished Hyde to the Land of Untold Stories. Belle is still distrustful with Gold, but he insists she will need him to protect their child, claiming that “necessity” will make her love him once again.

Back at Storybrooke Elementary School, Snow resumes her role as teacher, and introduces her new assistant Shirin to the class. Realizing that the students are struggling, Shirin suggests that Snow embrace her past to inspire them. Taking a cue from Isaac Newton, Snow uses her experience as an archer and the students are in awe, winning her confidence with them. At the end of the school day, Shirin later meets up with the Oracle, where they are coordinating plans to search for Aladdin, as Shirin is revealed to be Princess Jasmine.

== Production ==
- Rebecca Mader, who was credited in this episode, was not featured.
- The episode features Jonny Coyne as Dr. Lydgate, reprising the role he originated in Once Upon a Time in Wonderland, thus establishing Jekyll and Hyde's "Victorian England" as the same "realm of story" that was featured on that show.
- The reason why Gold cuts his hair is because, during the break between the fifth and sixth seasons, Robert Carlyle had filmed Trainspotting 2 which required his hair to be shortened (Carlyle having worn a wig for the season's previous episodes).

== Reception ==
=== Ratings ===
The episode saw a drop from the previous outing, posting a 1.1/4 rating among 18-49s with 3.48 million tuning in.

=== Reviews ===
- Justin Kirkland of Entertainment Weekly gave the episode a B+.
- The AV Club gave out pointers on the episode, giving positive points on Jekyll and Hyde's backstory and twist, but were mixed on the premise and scenes.
- Christine Laskodi of TV Fantic gave the episode a good review: 4.0 out of 5.0
