= I'll Be Your Mirror (disambiguation) =

"I'll Be Your Mirror" is a song by The Velvet Underground

I'll Be Your Mirror may also refer to:

- I'll Be Your Mirror - A series of live music events from the organisation behind All Tomorrow's Parties.
- I'll Be Your Mirror, a book of selected Andy Warhol interviews.
- "I'll Be Your Mirror" (Once Upon a Time), an episode of the sixth season of Once Upon a Time
- I'll Be Your Mirror: A Tribute to The Velvet Underground & Nico, 2021 compilation album
