= Heartless (Once Upon a Time) =

- Once Upon a Time episode
- Episode no.: Season 6 Episode 7
- Directed by: Ralph Hemecker
- Written by: Jane Espenson
- Production code: 607
- Original air date: November 6, 2016

Guest appearances
- Keegan Connor Tracy as Mother Superior/Blue Fairy; Paul Johansson as Woodcutter/Gabriel; Gabrielle Rose as Ruth

Episode chronology
| ← Previous "Dark Waters" | Next → "I'll Be Your Mirror" |
- Once Upon a Time season 6

"Heartless" is the seventh episode of the sixth season of the American fantasy drama series Once Upon a Time, which aired on November 6, 2016.

In this episode, the Evil Queen blackmails Snow and David into giving her their shared heart, while flashbacks show that Snow White and David encountered each other before they met and fell in love.

== Plot ==
=== Opening sequence ===
Charming's sheepdog Wilby walks through the forest.

=== Event chronology ===
The Enchanted Forest events take place after "The Heart Is a Lonely Hunter" and "White Out" and before "Red Handed" and "The Shepherd". The Storybrooke events take place after "Dark Waters".

=== In the Characters' Past ===
In the Enchanted Forest before the first curse, Snow White, hunted by the Evil Queen but not yet a bandit, sells her last heirloom to a nobleman for a pittance, only for him to betray her to the Woodcutter, a bounty hunter whom she fights off with help from the Blue Fairy. Having saved enough money to buy passage on a ship, Snow plans to head for the port city of Longborn. At the same time, Ruth sends David to Longborn to sell their farm, as they lack the resources to maintain it. Disguised as a peddler, the Woodcutter drugs David in order to use his sheep dog, Wilby, to track and capture Snow. When David comes to, Wilby leads him to the Woodcutter's wagon; Snow, locked inside, advises David to run. He instead tries to break the lock with a rock, but is interrupted by the Woodcutter's return. They fight, and the Woodcutter bashes a hole in the wagon, enabling Snow to hold back the Woodcutter's arm so David can kill him. Snow tells David that it would be safest for him to never see her face, so he hands the key through the hole. David's faith in Snow's resourcefulness convinces her that she can live by her wits and stay in her own kingdom; hearing that David is in need of money, she gives him her savings as a reward. As their hands touch, a magical spark of true love gives birth to a sapling at David's feet.

=== In Storybrooke ===
In the present day, Snow is waking up in the middle of the night, and finds herself in the middle of the woods when The Evil Queen emerges from behind a tree, reminding her of how lucky she has been, only to remind Snow that she still desires her heart, and with David having the other half, the Evil Queen tells Snow that she'll acquire it too for a “little bit more.” She gives Snow a mysterious potion and disappears, Snow then shows Regina the potion, and identifies it as water from the River of Lost Souls. Regina believes the Evil Queen obtained it from Gold as a part of a plan to destroy the whole town. Mother Superior believes that a magical sapling could be powerful enough to entrap the Evil Queen, and Regina hatches a plan by sending a note to Zelena demanding that she meets her other half at Gold's Pawn Shop.

Earlier, the Evil Queen promised Zelena that there was nothing going on between her and Gold, but when Zelena stops by the Pawn Shop, she catches the Evil Queen and Gold snogging, just as Regina planned. Around the same time, Mother Superior enacts a spell that should help Snow, David, and Regina get to the sapling. It leads them to a trapdoor in the ground, and they hop right in. As Snow and David find the sapling, they both touch it and the history of their love flashbacks right before their eyes, only to have The Evil Queen appear to steal the sapling, snaps it in half, and vows to destroy Storybrooke if they don't surrender their hearts. At the vault, Hook calms Emma down when her hands start to tremor & uses Henry's storybook to make Emma feel better and to remind her that her parents’ love can overcome any obstacle. They "always found each other." As she grows worried about her parents' fate and (possibly her visions); and how Emma inherited the strength of that love. “You can overcome these visions. You can overcome anything,” he assures her: "Remember who you are, the product of true love” — at which moment her hand stabilized.

Later on at the cemetery, the Evil Queen gathers the town to tell them her plan to kill them all if Snow and David don't appear in the next few minutes. Just as Emma is ready to fight, the couple arrives and asks Regina to lift her protection spell from them, allowing The Evil Queen to rip out their hearts and hold them in her hands. She declares that killing them would be too easy and that she wants them to feel the pain of her loneliness. She thrusts their hearts back in, and Snow quickly passes out. The Evil Queen calls it a sleeping curse with “a little twist,” and she makes Snow's body disappear and taunts David to go find her. He doesn't find her at the loft, so he quickly heads towards the woods, evoking the first time the couple were in this situation. David finds Snow asleep in the same fallen tree coffin as the first time. Snow is awoken by true love's kiss, but David immediately passes out and falls to the ground. Regina deciphers that The Evil Queen has placed a sleeping curse on their shared heart, meaning the couple now share the curse, meaning that one will always be asleep while the other is awake, thus never allowing them to be together.

Finally, after Zelena told Belle at the cemetery about the Evil Queen and Gold having a kiss, Belle visits Gold at the Pawn Shop. Although she isn't concerned about him being involved with the Evil Queen, she is furious over the fact that Gold would acquire the Fates' Shears with The Evil Queen's involvement. Belle warns Gold that she forbids him to change their unborn child for his own selfish reasons. After she leaves, Gold becomes furious with Zelena.

== Reception ==
=== Ratings ===
The episode posted a 1.1/3 rating among 18-49s with 3.56 million viewers tuning in, up from the previous episode.

=== Reviews ===
- Christine Laskodi of TV Fantic gave the episode a mild review: 3.5 out of 5.0
- Entertainment Weekly gave the episode a A−.
