= The Other Shoe =

- Once Upon a Time episode
- Episode no.: Season 6 Episode 3
- Directed by: Steve Pearlman
- Written by: Jane Espenson & Jerome Schwartz
- Production code: 603
- Original air date: October 9, 2016

Guest appearances
- David Anders as Dr. Victor Frankenstein/Dr. Whale; Lee Arenberg as Grumpy/Leroy; Hank Harris as The Groundsman/Dr. Jekyll; Beverly Elliot as Widow Lucas / Granny; Raphael Sbarge as Jiminy Cricket / Dr. Archie Hopper; Jessy Schram as Cinderella / Ashley Boyd; Sam Witwer as The Warden / Mr. Hyde; Lisa Banes as Lady Tremaine; Max Lloyd-Jones as Jacob; Mekenna Melvin as Clorinda; Tim Phillipps as Prince Thomas / Sean Herman

Episode chronology
← Previous "A Bitter Draught"	Next → "Strange Case"
- Once Upon a Time season 6

"The Other Shoe" is the third episode of the sixth season of the American fantasy drama series Once Upon a Time, which aired on October 9, 2016.

In this episode, Cinderella's actions in the Enchanted Forest involving her stepfamily suddenly play out in Storybrooke, as Emma, Henry, and Hook must stop Ashley from going after her stepsister after she blames herself for ruining her happy ending; meanwhile, Regina discovers that Hyde has made a deal with the Evil Queen, Gold helps David find out the truth about his father's death by delivering a message to Belle. Snow helps Jekyll with a plan to destroy the Evil Queen.

== Plot ==
=== Opening sequence ===
Gus the field mouse running inside the glass "O" hamster wheel of "Once Upon a Time".

=== Event chronology ===
The Enchanted Forest events before the ball take place before Cinderella signs Rumplestiltskin's contract in "The Price of Gold". In contrast, the rest of the events take place between this scene and Cinderella and Thomas's wedding from that same episode. The Storybrooke events take place after "A Bitter Draught".

=== In the Characters' Past ===
In the Enchanted Forest, Ella is being forced to clean by her stepmother, Lady Tremaine. The family receives an invitation to go to a ball from Jacob, the Prince's footman. When Ella, wanting to go to the ball, shows them her mother's gown, her stepsister Clorinda throws it into the fire. It leaves laughing at her, earning Ella the name "Cinderella". Ella then sees a key drop out of the pocket of the gown. She discovers that it belonged to her mother and leads to a magical door to the Land of Untold Stories.

During the night at the ball, Ella and Gus (who was turned into a human and later goes to eat cheese) arrive and meet Snow for the first time, then encounter Prince Thomas, and the two dance together. After he excuses himself, Ella sees him talking to her stepsister, Clorinda. Lady Tremaine tells Ella that he was making fun of her. She runs off, leaving her glass slipper.

Later that night, Gus shows Ella the key in the box in her closet, which opens up the portal to the Land of Untold Stories, but Clorinda stops her because she wants to marry Jacob and wants Ella to marry Prince Thomas. Clorinda wants to get away from her mother as soon as possible. When Lady Tremaine returns home, she confronts Ella and demands answers as to where Clorinda went. She then notices the glass slipper and uses it as bait to make Ella tell the truth. Ella gives in, but Lady Tremaine drops the glass slipper and it shatters into pieces.

She locks Ella inside the palace. When Thomas and Snow arrive, Gus alerts them and they rescue Ella. Prince Thomas asks Ella to marry him after she apologizes, but afterwards goes to warn Clorinda, who is about to leave for the Land of Untold Stories with Jacob. When Lady Tremaine shows up to stab Jacob, she injures Clorinda and then opens the portal to take her daughter with her.

=== In Storybrooke ===
At the mental hospital, Regina, Snow and David pays a visit to see Hyde with Regina's favorite dish as a bribe, but discovered the Evil Queen had beaten her to the punch; Hyde now has luxurious furniture in his cell, and tells them the only way he'll talk is if they remove the cuffs. Regina is upset that Zelena is keeping her other half away from her after she noticed a baby rattle that Cora gave Regina.

Over at Granny's, Emma, Henry, and Hook are joined by Ashley and her daughter, Alexandra, who is happy to help out with assimilating the new children into Storybrooke. After Emma stopped by to see Archie involving her visions, she runs into Sean, who tells Emma that Ashley took off with a rifle. Emma believes she's going after her step-family. With help from Henry and Hook, they start looking for Ashley by using her shoe to locate her. When they catch up with Ashley, Emma, Henry and Hook learn that Ashley wants to find Clorinda. Emma's hand starts shaking just as Ashley gets away, but soon the Evil Queen shows up and takes advantage of the situation by sending Emma, Hook, and Henry "off the chessboard".

Thanks to Henry's quick thinking, he looks at the book to find out how to bring them to Clorinda. When Ashley arrived to the stable, she finds an injured Clorinda who was faking it as bait, when Lady Tremaine points the shotgun at her. Clorinda then threatens to shoot Ashley but stops and she learns that Jacob is alive and that they are in his farm. As they are reunited, Lady Tremaine threatens to shoot them but Ashley protects them but is stabbed with Lady Tremaine's poisoned cane. Emma, Henry and Hook arrive and stop Lady Tremaine from doing any more damage. With encouragement from Henry, Emma uses her magic to heal Ashley. Later on, Emma asks Hook to move in with her, and he agrees. As part of her punishment for stabbing Ashley, Tremaine is jailed and forced to do clean up detail under Leroy's supervision.

David is still concerned over how his father died, and as he gives Snow encouragement to teach again, he visits Gold and makes a deal with him. David visits Belle and tells her about the deal and then gives Belle the gift. At the same time, Snow comes up with a plan to help Jekyll, and later shows Regina a lab located in Whale's garage to prepare the plans to stop the Evil Queen. Later that night, Snow tells David not to seek revenge on what happened to his father as he reads a note over a candle. The note reveals that David's father was murdered in a cart accident. Belle listened to the tape from Gold. Back at the mental hospital, The Evil Queen visits Hyde again, and uses her magic to free him from the cuffs and they walk out of the cell together, linking arms.

== Cultural references ==
- Cinderella is a European fairytale.
  - Cinderella's stepsisters Clorinda and Tisbe are from La Cenerentola, an opera adapting the story of Cinderella.
  - The stepmother's name, Lady Tremaine, is taken from Disney's Cinderella.

== Production ==
- Ted Whittal portrayed the King (Cinderella's father-in-law) in the season 1 episode "The Price of Gold"; he was supposed to be in this episode, but his appearance was cut for an unknown reason.
- Spin-off series Once Upon a Time in Wonderland had previously implied that one of Cinderella's stepsisters was Anastasia, whose mother was portrayed in one scene by Sarah-Jane Redmond; after her stepsister achieved her happy ending, Anastasia escaped her bitter mother by fleeing with her lover to Wonderland. This would appear to have been ignored in creating this episode.

== Reception ==
=== Ratings ===
- The episode saw a ratings increase from the previous episode, posting a 1.3/4 among 18-49s with 4.56 million viewers tuning in.

=== Reviews ===
- Justin Kirkland of Entertainment Weekly gave the episode a B+.
- Christine Laskodi of TV Fantic gave the episode a positive review: 4.5 out of 5.0
