= Steve Pearlman =

TV producer

- Born: United States
- Occupations: Television producer, director
- Years active: 2005–present

Steve Pearlman is a Canadian television producer and director.

He is well known for his work on the ABC series V and Once Upon a Time.

== Career ==
Pearlman began his career on the 2005 drama Related, as an executive producer. He would go on to serve in the same capacity on Dr. Vegas, Reunion, the TV movie The World According to Barnes, V and Dead of Summer.

=== Once Upon a Time ===
After the cancellation of V, Pearlman was hired as executive producer on the first season of ABC's Once Upon a Time. After remaining on the show for four years, Pearlman helmed his first episode of broadcast television, with the episode "Poor Unfortunate Soul". He returned during the fifth season to direct the sixteenth episode, "Our Decay". He directed the third episode of the sixth season, "The Other Shoe"; which told an extended tale of Cinderella.
