= Once Upon a Time season 6 =

Once Upon a Time
- Season 6
- DVD cover
- Starring: Ginnifer Goodwin; Jennifer Morrison; Lana Parrilla; Josh Dallas; Emilie de Ravin; Colin O'Donoghue; Jared S. Gilmore; Rebecca Mader; Robert Carlyle
- No. of episodes: 22

Release
- Original network: ABC
- Original release: September 25, 2016 – May 14, 2017

Season chronology
- ← Previous; Season 5 Next → Season 7

The sixth season of the American ABC fantasy-drama series Once Upon a Time was ordered on March 3, 2016. It premiered on September 25, 2016, and concluded on May 14, 2017. Returning as principal cast members are Ginnifer Goodwin, Jennifer Morrison, Lana Parrilla, Josh Dallas, Emilie de Ravin, Colin O'Donoghue, Jared S. Gilmore, Rebecca Mader, and Robert Carlyle. This season marks the final appearance of Goodwin, Morrison, Dallas, De Ravin, Gilmore, and Mader as regulars, with the following seventh and final season being a soft reboot.

Existing fictional characters introduced to the series during the season include Aladdin, Jasmine, the Count of Monte Cristo, Captain Nemo, Lady Tremaine, Beowulf, Tiger Lily, and the Tin Man. The season also reintroduced Jafar and Dr. Arthur Lydgate, both of whom previously appeared in Once Upon a Time in Wonderland.

== Premise ==
The residents of Storybrooke are faced with threats from the Evil Queen and Mr. Hyde, both with different agendas following the arrival of refugees from the Land of Untold Stories. It leads to events testing Emma's savior abilities that result in the arrival of the Black Fairy, thus beginning the final battle that is prophesied before the casting of the original Dark Curse. As dark and light collide, a new and darker curse is unleashed, leading to the fall of all the realms. The final battle is fought and won, leading to the heroes earning their happy beginnings. In the future, a new adventure begins for an adult Henry and his daughter Lucy.

== Cast and characters ==
=== Main ===
- Ginnifer Goodwin as Snow White / Mary Margaret Blanchard (Note: Also appears as the Wish Realm counterpart in "Wish You Were Here" and/or "Tougher Than the Rest")
- Jennifer Morrison as Emma Swan
- Lana Parrilla as Evil Queen / Regina Mills (Note: Also appears as the Serum counterpart in episodes 1–10, 13–14, and 21–22)
- Josh Dallas as Prince Charming / David Nolan
- Emilie de Ravin as Belle French
- Colin O'Donoghue as Captain Hook / Killian Jones
- Jared S. Gilmore as Henry Mills
- Rebecca Mader as Wicked Witch of the West / Zelena
- Robert Carlyle as Rumplestiltskin / Mr. Gold

=== Recurring ===
- Beverley Elliott as Widow Lucas / Granny
- Raphael Sbarge as Jiminy Cricket / Dr. Archie Hopper
- Lee Arenberg as Dreamy / Grumpy / Leroy
- David Paul Grove as Doc
- Gabe Khouth as Sneezy / Mr. Clark
- Faustino Di Bauda as Sleepy / Walter
- Mig Macario as Bashful
- Geoff Gustafson as Stealthy (Wish Realm)
- Tony Amendola as Mister Geppetto / Marco
- Keegan Connor Tracy as the Blue Fairy / Mother Superior
- Eion Bailey as Pinocchio / August Booth
- David Anders as Victor Frankenstein / Dr. Whale
- Jessy Schram as Cinderella / Ashley Boyd
- Tim Phillipps as Prince Thomas / Sean Herman
- Gabrielle Rose as Ruth
- Alan Dale as King George / Albert Spencer
- Jaime Murray as Fiona / the Black Fairy
- Giles Matthey as Gideon / Morpheus
- Sean Maguire as Robin of Locksley (Wish Realm)
- Tony Perez as Prince Henry
- Rose McIver as Tinker Bell
- JoAnna Garcia as Ariel
- Gil McKinney as Prince Eric
- Giancarlo Esposito as Magic Mirror / Sidney Glass
- Chris Gauthier as Mr. Smee
- Hank Harris as Dr. Henry Jekyll
- Sam Witwer as Mr. Hyde
- Deniz Akdeniz as Aladdin
- Karen David as Jasmine
- Olivia Steele Falconer as Violet
- Tzi Ma as the Dragon
- Patrick Fischler as Isaac Heller
- Sara Tomko as Tiger Lily
- Wil Traval as the Sheriff of Nottingham / Keith

=== Guest ===
- Oded Fehr as Jafar
- Tarun Keram as Emir
- Jordyn Ashley Olson as the Oracle
- Craig Horner as Edmond Dantès / Count of Monte Cristo
- Andrea Brooks as Charlotte
- Andrew Kavadas as Baron Danglars
- Lisa Banes as Lady Tremaine
- Mekenna Melvin as Clorinda Tremaine
- Goldie Hoffman as Tisbe Tremaine
- Max Lloyd-Jones as Jacob
- Jarod Joseph as Gus
- Jonny Coyne as Dr. Arthur Lydgate
- Elizabeth Blackmore as Mary Lydgate
- Reilly Jacob as Tom Sawyer
- Cedric De Souza as the Sultan
- Kate Dion-Richard as Goldilocks
- Faran Tahir as Captain Nemo
- Nick Eversman as First Mate Liam Jones II
- Paul Johansson as Gabriel / the Woodcutter
- Nick Hunnings as Jack
- Tammy Gillis as Jill
- Mckenna Grace as young Emma
- Rustin Gresiuk as teen August / Pinocchio
  - Jack Davies as young Pinocchio
- David Cubitt as Robert
- Tara Wilson as young Ruth
- Luke Roessler as young David and James
- Brandon Spink as young Baelfire
- Torstein Bjørklund as Beowulf
- Zahf Paroo as Prince Achmed
- Charles Mesure as Blackbeard
- Anton Starkman as young Gideon
- Grayson Gabriel as Roderick
  - Mason McKenzie as young Roderick
- Isabella Blake-Thomas as young Zelena
- Alex Désert as Stanum / Tin Man
  - Austin Obiajunwa as young Stanum
- Stephen Lord as Malcolm
- Andrew J. West as adult Henry Mills
- Alison Fernandez as Lucy

== Episodes ==
No. overall	No. in season	Title	Directed by	Written by	Original release date	US viewers (millions)
112	1	"The Savior"	Eagle Egilsson	Edward Kitsis & Adam Horowitz	September 25, 2016	3.99
In the past, Aladdin, a "Savior", is taunted by Jafar over the inevitable downfall of all Saviors. In Storybrooke, refugees arrive from the Land of Untold Stories. Emma experiences tremors and visions; an arrested Hyde helps her receive an oracle's vision of a hooded figure killing her. Guided by Morpheus, Gold enters Belle's dreams to lift the sleeping curse; he tries to renew their love, but she rejects him. "Morpheus" reveals he is really their unborn son, and desired this outcome. Belle wakes and leaves Gold. Henry convinces Regina that Hades may have lied about Robin Hood's soul having been destroyed. Zelena moves in with Regina but, after learning her sister blames her for Robin Hood's death, moves out and is approached by the Evil Queen.
113	2	"A Bitter Draught"	Ron Underwood	Andrew Chambliss & Dana Horgan	October 2, 2016	3.72
In the past in the Enchanted Forest, the Evil Queen offers to aid the revenge plot of Edmond Dantes, the Count of Monte Cristo, if he kills Snow and David. When he falls in love with Snow's handmaiden, he reneges and flees with her to the Land of Untold Stories to save her from poison. In Storybrooke, the Evil Queen recruits Zelena and uses Edmond's heart to set him against Snow and David; Regina kills Edmond to save the others, and realizes she retains the capacity for darkness. The Evil Queen declares that the undesirable "untold stories" will be played out. She gives David evidence that his father's death was not accidental. Belle lives on Hook's ship; in a deal with Gold, the Evil Queen will not harm her or the baby. Emma tells Archie about her visions and notes that Regina isn't present in them and could be the hooded figure.
114	3	"The Other Shoe"	Steve Pearlman	Jane Espenson & Jerome Schwartz	October 9, 2016	4.11
In the past in the Enchanted Forest, Cinderella meets Prince Thomas at the ball, but flees when she believes he loves her stepsister Clorinda; Clorinda actually plans to elope with Thomas' footman, Jacob, but her mother, Lady Tremaine, abducts her to the Land of Untold Stories after forcing Cinderella to betray Clorinda's location. In Storybrooke, Ashley hopes to reconcile with Clorinda. Aided by the Evil Queen, Tremaine lures Ashley into a trap for her and Jacob. Ashley protects Jacob; Clorinda reunites with him and forgives Cinderella, while Tremaine is arrested. Emma struggles to control her magic. Whale helps Jekyll recreate his serum, while the Evil Queen and Hyde form an alliance and she releases him. Snow White wants normality, but David secretly investigates his father's death; Gold provides information in exchange for David delivering a message to Belle.
115	4	"Strange Case"	Alrick Riley	David H. Goodman & Nelson Soler	October 16, 2016	3.53
In the past in Victorian England, Jekyll petitions the Academy of Science for membership but Dr. Lydgate rejects him. Rumplestiltskin arrives and magically perfects Jekyll's serum; Jekyll transforms into Hyde, who blackmails Lydgate for Jekyll's membership. Mary is Lydgate's daughter and Jekyll's unrequited love; she and Hyde fall in love. Jekyll accidentally fatally defenestrates Mary; he frames Hyde. In Storybrooke, Gold imprisons Belle on the ship to protect her from Hyde; but it is Jekyll who tries to kill Belle in revenge for Rumplestiltskin's role in Mary's death. Hook saves Belle by killing Jekyll, and Hyde dies of identical wounds; Regina asks Emma to kill her if necessary to stop the Evil Queen. Gold warns Belle that their child will need his protection. Mary Margaret resumes teaching, and her assistant Shirin inspires her to draw on her life as Snow. Shirin is secretly Princess Jasmine, working with the Oracle to search for Aladdin.
116	5	"Street Rats"	Norman Buckley	Edward Kitsis & Adam Horowitz	October 23, 2016	3.40
In the past in Agrabah, Aladdin seeks a magical weapon for Jasmine, to save the kingdom from Jafar; he is the weapon and a Savior. Jafar tempts Aladdin with magical shears that can sever him from his fate as the Savior and from his resulting death. Aladdin rejects Jafar and saves Jasmine. In Storybrooke, the Oracle is murdered. Emma helps Jasmine, hoping Aladdin's survival ensures her own. Having faked his death, Aladdin reveals himself to Emma and confesses that he doomed Agrabah by using the shears, which he gives to her; she asks Hook to dispose of them, but he secretly keeps them. The Evil Queen impersonates Archie to learn of Emma's visions, and convinces Zelena to turn Archie back into a cricket.
117	6	"Dark Waters"	Robert Duncan	Andrew Chambliss & Brigitte Hales	October 30, 2016	3.06
During the first Dark Curse, Captain Nemo abducts Hook and invites him to join the crew "family" of his submarine, Nautilus, in their quest for the "Mysterious Island", which is the Land of Untold Stories. Hook discovers the first mate is his half-brother, Liam, and decides to leave to avoid confrontation; but Liam attacks him, instead mortally wounding Nemo, who steps in. In the present, Archie is freed. Henry confronts Hook over lying about the shears, and Liam imprisons them on Nautilus. Hook opens up and Henry accepts him as family; they save each other and dispose of the shears. Modern medicine saves Nemo; he, Liam, and Hook make amends. Emma and Aladdin discuss being a Savior. Jasmine reveals that Agrabah vanished. Snow supports Belle at her ultrasound. The Evil Queen seduces Gold and offers the retrieved shears in exchange for help taking Snow's heart.
118	7	"Heartless"	Ralph Hemecker	Jane Espenson	November 6, 2016	3.56
In the past, fugitive Snow and shepherd David separately travel to Longbourn; she to flee the kingdom and he to sell his struggling farm. Without ever seeing each other's faces, David saves Snow from a bounty hunter and she repays him with money to save the farm, deciding not to flee. Their hands touch and a magical sapling is created. In the present, the Evil Queen threatens to destroy Storybrooke with River of Lost Souls water unless Snow and David hand over their hearts. They learn the sapling could stop the Queen, who destroys it just after they find it. But it has shown them their previous meeting, and they conclude that their love can endure anything; they surrender themselves. The Queen casts a sleeping curse on their hearts; because they share Snow's heart, the curse affects them both; each can wake the other but immediately succumbs to the curse, so they can never be awake together. Regina uses Gold's relationship with the Queen to separate the latter from Zelena, who earns Gold's enmity by exposing his schemes to Belle.
119	8	"I'll Be Your Mirror"	Jennifer Lynch	Jerome Schwartz & Leah Fong	November 13, 2016	3.40
Regina and Emma try to magically trap the Evil Queen in the World Behind the Mirror, but she traps them there, where the Dragon is already imprisoned. Henry prepares for a date with Violet; the Queen impersonates Regina and tries to manipulate him but he recognizes her. Emma and Regina discover Sidney was building a mirror portal out of the world and try and finish it, but the Evil Queen forces the Dragon to attack Emma and Regina, using his heart, and tries to make Henry kill the Dragon with the Hammer of Hephaestus; he instead uses it to free his mothers. Mary Margaret and David adjust to living in shifts. Belle asks Zelena to help her escape Storybrooke via magical portal, and they form an alliance with Aladdin and Jasmine. Aladdin steals the Genie's lamp and the Sorcerer's wand from Gold's shop, but Gold takes the wand back from Zelena and puts a magical tracking device on Belle. He asks the Queen to kill Zelena, as the connection between his and Zelena's hearts protects her from him.
120	9	"Changelings"	Mairzee Almas	David H. Goodman & Brian Ridings	November 27, 2016	3.28
In the Enchanted Forest, while served by Belle, Rumplestiltskin abducts a baby to use as bait for the Black Fairy, the mother who abandoned him; she escapes without answering his questions. In the present, Belle receives advice from her unborn child while Gold becomes increasingly unhinged. Resenting Gold's order to attack Zelena, the Evil Queen accelerates Belle's pregnancy; Mother Superior delivers Belle's son, Gideon, and sends him into hiding; Gold vows to find him. As the Genie has been freed, Aladdin takes his place. Zelena and Regina continue to feud. Emma obtains the sword from her vision.
121	10	"Wish You Were Here"	Ron Underwood	Edward Kitsis & Adam Horowitz	December 4, 2016	3.27
Emma discovers the sword can kill the Evil Queen without hurting Regina. The Queen steals the lamp and wishes Emma to an alternate reality where she was never the Savior; Regina follows her. David and his allies take the lamp from the Queen, who is turned into a serpent by the hooded figure, revealed to be an adult Gideon, who had been taken by the Black Fairy. Jasmine wishes herself and Aladdin to Agrabah. In the "Wish Realm", Emma lives as a princess until Regina restores her memory. Regina frees Wish Rumplestiltskin in exchange for a magic bean, but the portal to Storybrooke closes while Regina is distracted by the appearance of Wish Robin Hood.
122	11	"Tougher Than the Rest"	Billy Gierhart	Edward Kitsis & Adam Horowitz	March 5, 2017	3.03
In 1990 Minnesota, a young Emma is told by a teenager that she has the power to change her fate. In present day, after missing their way out of the Wish Realm, Emma and Regina find another escape option in Wish August, who agrees to help make a new portal. After Regina tracks down Wish Robin, they're caught by the Wish Realm's Sheriff of Nottingham and later by Wish Rumple. Robin believes Regina when she tells him about their being in an alternate reality. Emma discovers that August was the teenager she met back in Minnesota and inspires his Wish counterpart to complete the portal. Emma and Regina, with Wish Robin in tow, return to Storybrooke, where Gideon explains to Gold and Belle his intention to kill Emma so that he can gain her powers and kill the Black Fairy, a move that has David furious and Belle concerned. Emma and Gideon meets and duels, with Emma surviving. Gold and Belle decide to work together for the good of their son.
123	12	"Murder Most Foul"	Morgan Beggs	Jerome Schwartz & Jane Espenson	March 12, 2017	3.06
The events of how Robert, the father of David and James, was murdered are detailed in a flashback, in which Robert learns what happened to James after he ran away from King George. With help from Rumple, he tracks him to Pleasure Island, but their reunion is cut short by King George, who orders Robert's execution. His death affects David in the present day after he sees visions of Robert and asks Hook to help him, despite his being reformed. When Hook becomes concerned that David is taking this investigation too far by going after Albert, he intervenes and brings David back to sanity. Hook is also worried about whether David will give him his blessing to marry Emma, but David does. Meanwhile, Regina tries to get the Wish Realm Robin assimilated into Storybrooke, but soon questions why he agreed to follow her, as it turns out that he had something else planned after he steals a chest from the vault. The truth as to who really murdered Robert is revealed when August gives Hook missing pages he took from Henry's book. When Hook sees an illustration of David's dad, he recognizes him and recalls murdering him during a robbery in the Enchanted Forest so that there was no witness to his crime.
124	13	"Ill-Boding Patterns"	Ron Underwood	Andrew Chambliss & Dana Horgan	March 19, 2017	2.71
During the First Ogres War, Beowulf leads a fearsome charge on the battlefield in the Enchanted Forest of old. After every last soldier had been slain, Beowulf surrenders to death just as Rumplestiltskin intervenes, killing all the ogres. Hailed as a hero in the village, Beowulf is irked by Rumple's new title. He creates a ruse to lead Rumple to his demise. Fearing he would not be able to follow through on protecting the villagers without Dark Magic, Rumple bestows his dagger upon Baelfire as an insurance policy. Following a turbulent exchange and threat to frame Rumplestiltskin as a murderer, Beowulf retreats. Feeling the pressure of his threat, Bae commands his father to kill him. Rumple later doses Bae with a memory potion to erase the ordeal from his mind and restore his innocence. In Storybrooke, Gold recognizes a familiar pattern in Gideon, who makes strides in his quest to kill Emma at the cost of the Blue Fairy's vitality. Hook worries about the repercussions of telling Emma his secret, after Emma unknowingly forces a proposal after happening upon Hook's engagement ring. Wish Robin attempts to flee the town before being stopped by Regina. The Evil Queen escapes her reptilian confinement and indoctrinates Robin.
125	14	"Page 23"	Kate Woods	David H. Goodman & Brigitte Hales	March 26, 2017	2.85
In a flashback, the Evil Queen searches for a spell that will help her kill Snow White, but her father Henry has love in mind for his daughter and leads her on a quest to Cupid's Arrow. However, the Evil Queen rebrands the arrow to follow hatred and discovers that the person she despises the most is herself. In Storybrooke, The Evil Queen and Regina face off in a final confrontation. Just when Regina wins the upper hand, she remembers the Evil Queen's self-loathing and evenly splits the light and the darkness in their hearts, allowing the Evil Queen to redeem herself. Emma discovers Hook's secret and calls off the engagement, leaving Hook to board the Nautilus with Captain Nemo. Hook later changes his mind following a conversation with Snow, but before he can return, Gideon hijacks the vessel and sends it out of Storybrooke.
126	15	"A Wondrous Place"	Steve Pearlman	Jane Espenson & Jerome Schwartz	April 2, 2017	2.80
Regina suggests a girls' night out with Emma and Snow. While at the bar, she confides in the mixologist and sheds a tear. Meanwhile, the Nautilus is transported to the Enchanted Forest, where Aladdin and Jasmine board; they have yet to locate Agrabah. After Hook and Jasmine confide in one another, the vessel is irrevocably damaged and Jasmine uses a genie wish to relocate the group to the island Jafar is at. They discover a cabana belonging to Ariel and Prince Eric, with the former having collected a genie lamp that houses Jafar. (Note: In which he was trapped during the Once Upon a Time in Wonderland episode "And They Lived...") Jasmine is able to sway Jafar into divulging where Agrabah is before defeating him with magic dust. Through true love's kiss, Aladdin and Jasmine, along with Hook and Ariel, are transported to the restored city, and Aladdin's genie curse is broken. Ariel supplies Hook with a means to reach Emma. Emma receives the message and Gideon, no longer masquerading as the mixologist, threatens that he will use her tears to keep Hook from returning to Storybrooke unless she helps him kill the Black Fairy. Flashbacks to Ariel and Jasmine's first meeting show the princess falter under Jafar's trickery and leading to Agrabah's vanishing.
127	16	"Mother's Little Helper"	Billy Gierhart	Story by : Edward Kitsis & Adam Horowitz; Teleplay by : Paul Karp	April 9, 2017	2.60
In Storybrooke, Gold reveals to Emma and Snow that the Black Fairy is his mother, and that the Dark Curse Regina had cast was created by the Black Fairy. Emma agrees to help Gideon kill the Black Fairy, but is double-crossed by Gideon and left to die at the hands of a giant spider before Gold saves her. Gideon opens a portal, allowing the Black Fairy to slip through into Storybrooke. Meanwhile, in the Enchanted Forest, Hook wagers the Jolly Roger for a magic bean in a game of cards with Blackbeard. As Blackbeard and Hook go through the portal, it malfunctions thanks to Gideon and the duo ends up in Neverland, on the run from the remnants of Peter Pan's Lost Boys. Henry experiences a disorienting shift in his Author powers, so he and Regina seek help from the previous Author, Isaac Heller. Isaac reveals to Regina and Henry that they are nearing the end of the story in which the savior must fight the Final Battle. Flashbacks reveal the abuses the Black Fairy inflicted on Gideon, and that the Black Fairy is controlling Gideon to kill Emma via his heart.
128	17	"Awake"	Sharat Raju	Andrew Chambliss & Leah Fong	April 16, 2017	2.51
Regina works to wake Snow and Charming from the Sleeping Curse, while Hook, still in Neverland, meets up with Tiger Lily, who gives him a piece of an ancient fairy wand to aid Emma in defeating the Black Fairy. Gold confronts the Black Fairy over her controlling Gideon with his heart. A pixie flower allows Emma to open a doorway to Neverland and rescue Hook, who then proposes again. The townsfolk gather around Emma's sleeping parents and each take small amounts of the Sleeping Curse unto themselves, diluting it and waking Snow and David up. In 1993, a pixie flower awakens Snow and Charming from their cursed selves, but an awakened Rumplestiltskin tells them they must make a difficult decision to ensure that Emma fulfills her destiny as the Savior.
129	18	"Where Bluebirds Fly"	Michael Schultz	David H. Goodman & Brigitte Hales	April 23, 2017	2.69
In Oz of the past, Zelena's childhood friend Stanum asks for her help in finding the Crimson Heart, a magical artifact that would be able to restore his human form after having been cursed by the Wicked Witch of the North to slowly turn into tin. Zelena's refusal to give up her magic leads to her betraying Stanum, as she keeps the Heart and leaves him to turn into the Tin Man. In the present, the Black Fairy tempts Zelena with an offer to join her, only to have Zelena oppose her instead. Regina is brought into the chaos trying to stop her sister and they find the Black Fairy and Gideon in the crystal mines, with the Black Fairy tricking Zelena into utilizing her unstable magic. Realizing that there is nothing left for her in Oz, Zelena decides to acquire the Crimson Heart from there and use it to destroy her magic, undoing the mess she made in the mines. Emma then uses her magic and one of the crystals to bring Mother Superior out of her coma.
130	19	"The Black Fairy"	Alrick Riley	Jerome Schwartz & Dana Horgan	April 30, 2017	3.05
The origin of Rumplestiltskin's true destiny is revealed, as his mother Fiona learns from the Blue Fairy and Tiger Lily that he was destined to become the Savior. When Fiona fears for her son and chooses power over protecting Rumple, it results in her becoming the Black Fairy, and the Blue Fairy banishing her to the Dark Realm. In the present, as everyone looks for the missing wand, Gold brings Gideon and Emma into the Dream World to search for Gideon's heart, where the events of the flashbacks unfold. Gold then confronts Fiona, but she reveals the real reason behind why he was abandoned. Gold later retrieves Gideon's heart and tells everyone that the Black Fairy is dead, paving the way for Emma and Hook's wedding. However, Gold and Fiona make a deal that will see the Final Battle go forward, with Emma being the Savior that will fight in it. Meanwhile, Regina helps Zelena adjust to life without her powers.
131	20	"The Song in Your Heart"	Ron Underwood	David H. Goodman & Andrew Chambliss	May 7, 2017	2.87
In the past, Snow makes a wish that grants the entire Enchanted Forest the ability to use the gift of song as a strength, which also spreads to Oz. When Regina becomes affected by the wish, she finds a way to end it before the first curse takes place, but the Blue Fairy, who granted Snow the wish, tells Snow and David that the wish will be part of Emma's destiny. In Emma's past, her chance to make use of her talent is held back by being told she'll be alone. This would come back to haunt Emma in the present day, as Fiona use that weakness to take Emma's heart before unleashing a new curse on her wedding day, with help from Gold by freezing her family. Henry discovers a page in his book that reveals the song in Emma's heart will make her stronger, stopping Fiona from killing Emma. Emma and Hook marry before Fiona's curse erupts from the clock tower and spreads throughout Storybrooke.
132	21	"The Final Battle"	Steve Pearlman	Edward Kitsis & Adam Horowitz	May 14, 2017	2.95
133	22	"The Final Battle"	Ralph Hemecker	Edward Kitsis & Adam Horowitz	May 14, 2017	2.95
Fiona's curse alters Storybrooke, institutionalizing Emma and leaving only Henry and Gold awake, while sending Emma's other allies to their home realms. The Final Battle is over Emma's belief; if she stops believing in the realms of story, they will be consumed by Fiona's curse and cease to exist, while Fiona would gain unchecked powers and be able to break the Laws of Magic at will. In the Enchanted Forest, the banished characters gather at Regina's castle; David and Hook obtain a magic bean and the Evil Queen sacrifices herself, holding off the curse's storm to delay the group's destruction. Fiona convinces Emma to destroy the book, but Henry handdraws one that restores her belief in time to save everyone in the castle. Gold kills Fiona, who had hidden Belle and turned her into a coward; this breaks the curse and brings most of the group in the castle back to Storybrooke. Gideon is still under orders to kill Emma, prompting Gold to search for Gideon's heart, but a prior spell by Fiona prevents Gold from aborting the order. Emma lays down her sword, allowing Gideon to impale her; this releases Emma's light magic and Henry later kisses her awake. With both Gold and Emma having chosen good, Gideon is returned to infancy, and the realms are restored along with those who perished in the crisis. Many years later, an adult Henry vanishes while defending his daughter Lucy from an unidentified entity. In Seattle in the future, Lucy finds Henry, who no longer remembers her.

== Production ==
=== Development ===
Executive producers Adam Horowitz and Edward Kitsis announced that they were ending the half-season arc structure that was seen in seasons three through five, with Horowitz saying, "We’re also planning a 22-episode story as opposed to breaking it up into two halves this year. It has been really exciting and fun." Kitsis added: "We are changing around what we’re doing this year and going back to that season 1 mentality of small town stories and smaller arcs." This season would focus on Storybrooke as the main setting, but would also show new realms and an exploration of the Savior's mythology. Kitsis and Horowitz hired directors from their Freeform series Dead of Summer, Ron Underwood, Norman Buckley and Mairzee Almas, alongside Michael Schultz, to helm several episodes of the season. Jennifer Lynch directed the eighth episode of the season, "I'll Be Your Mirror".

In January 2017, ABC president Channing Dungey had been the first to suggest that the current narrative of the show would end with season six, regardless of whether or not there is a season seven. Shortly after this news, Jennifer Morrison revealed that the contracts for the original main cast members were expiring in April, expressing uncertainty about the future of the show and her participation in it beyond the current season. Robert Carlyle also expressed that he'd have to make a decision about his future on the show by the end of that month. In March 2017, several sources had reported that four of the current main cast members in particular - Morrison, Carlyle, Lana Parrilla, and Colin O'Donoghue - were in negotiations to renew their contracts for a potential seventh season. In April 2017, Horowitz and Kitsis confirmed that a group of characters will indeed have their stories wrapped up by the end of the season in acknowledging the potential cast changes, saying: "We planned this finale from the beginning of the year, so whoever stays and whoever goes... all those questions have already been dealt with. The audience does not have to fear [anything feeling] incomplete." On May 8, Morrison confirmed that she had declined an offer to remain on the show and that the sixth season would be her last, signaling the end of Emma Swan's time on the show as the main protagonist. On May 11, Rebecca Mader announced that she would also be leaving the show at the end of the season, citing creative decisions beyond her control. On May 12, season six was announced to be the last for four additional main actors: Ginnifer Goodwin, Josh Dallas, Jared Gilmore, and Emilie de Ravin. The season finale revealed that Henry Mills would remain a series protagonist, with the setting shifting to a later time period in which he is portrayed as an adult by Andrew J. West.

==== Musical episode ====
In January 2017, TVLine reported that the series would feature a musical episode later in the season. Creators Kitsis and Horowitz had spoken about the desire to do a musical installment previously, but didn't "even know where to begin." Kitsis and Horowitz confirmed the report in February. They had also since confirmed that the episode would feature seven original songs, including solos by Jennifer Morrison and Rebecca Mader, as well as a "sing-off" musical number featuring the Evil Queen and the Charmings. Composers Alan Zachary and Michael Weiner were brought in to write the original numbers featured, with arrangements provided by the series' long-time composer Mark Isham. Ron Underwood was hired to direct the episode. Kitsis and Hororwitz spoke about the nature of the episode saying, "It actually is a huge part of the mythology of the show and there are some big things that happen in the episode, frankly, it's been one of the challenges of doing the musical because we never wanted to do something where it was just like a to-the-side, one-off thing, and then get back to the main story. We want to see it part of the main story, which meant we had to really plan out this season with some great detail."

=== Casting ===
Horowitz: There certainly are nods to the film that we all love so much, that we're peppering in throughout. We're, right now, focusing on [Aladdin, Jasmine, and Jafar]. Kitsis: Obviously, I don't think we would touch the genie. I would like to see a monkey but I can't promise anything. I think, whereas some stories, like Frozen, we were very faithful to Frozen, I think you will see Aladdin will have its own Once twist.

— Executive producers Kitsis and Horowitz on Once's interpretation of Aladdin.

Emilie de Ravin told fans that she would be returning for the sixth season. It was also announced later that Hank Harris and Sam Witwer signed deals to guest star as two new recurring characters for the season, later revealed to be Dr. Jekyll and Mr. Hyde respectively. On March 29, 2016, Lana Parrilla confirmed that she would be returning for the season. Robert Carlyle was confirmed to be returning for the season as Rumplestiltskin along with Rebecca Mader as Zelena and Jared Gilmore as Henry Mills.

It was announced that Giles Matthey was cast as Morpheus, who was slated to appear in the first episode of the season. On July 20, it was announced that Craig Horner would be portraying the Count of Monte Cristo, who was introduced in the second episode of the season. At the 2016 San Diego Comic-Con, it was revealed that the season would see the introduction of Aladdin, played by Deniz Akdeniz, and his story would feature the return of Jafar, now portrayed by Oded Fehr. The character had previously been featured on Once Upon a Time in Wonderland, portrayed by Naveen Andrews, who was unavailable to reprise the role due to his commitment to Netflix's Sense8. It was also announced that Galavant's Karen David was cast as Princess Jasmine. David made her debut in the fourth episode of the season.

In early July, it was announced that Raphael Sbarge would be returning as Jiminy Cricket / Dr. Archie Hopper for the season, having last appearanced in the season 4 episode "Rocky Road". On July 20, it was announced that Jessy Schram would be reprising her role as Cinderella in the third episode of the season. The episode explored a connection that her character has to someone from the Land of Untold Stories, as well as the start of her friendship with Snow White. That same episode also introduced Cinderella's stepmother and stepsisters. David Anders returned for an episode as Victor Frankenstein, connecting the character with Jekyll and Hyde. On August 15, it was announced that Jonny Coyne would be reprising his role as Dr. Lydgate from Once Upon a Time in Wonderland, in the fourth episode of the season. On August 26, it was announced that Faran Tahir was cast as Captain Nemo, and would have ties to Captain Hook. On September 22, it was announced that Tzi Ma would be reprising his role as the Dragon in the season. Gabrielle Rose would also be returning as David's mother, Ruth, who appeared via flashback in episode 7. On September 27, it was announced that Sean Maguire would be returning as Robin Hood. The former main character, who died near the end of season 5, would not be resurrected, but would appear in a multi-episode arc in a different capacity.

For the second half of the season, Wil Traval returned for multiple episodes, starting in episode 11, as the Sheriff of Nottingham. On October 31, it was announced that Mckenna Grace would be returning as a younger version of Emma. On December 11, Robert Carlyle revealed that Brandon Spink would be portraying a young Baelfire in episode 13. On January 6, 2017, it was announced that JoAnna Garcia would be returning as Ariel. The storyline involves a team-up between Ariel, Jasmine, and Hook. On January 7, Horowitz confirmed that Gil McKinney would also be returning as Prince Eric. Two days later, it was announced that Rose McIver would also be coming back as Tinker Bell. On January 20, it was revealed that Sara Tomko was cast as Tiger Lily. The recurring character appears in at least two episodes starting in episode 17. On January 23, Horowitz announced that Patrick Fischler would return as Isaac Heller at some point in the second half of the season, having last appeared in the fourth season finale "Operation Mongoose". On March 14, it was announced that episode 18 would introduce the Tin Man, played by Alex Désert, and the Cowardly Lion from the Wizard of Oz tale.

On February 16, TVLine released casting call descriptions for two characters who appear in the season 6 finale, with potential to continue into season 7 if the show is to be renewed. One is a man in his late 20s-early 30s who "was once optimistic and hopeful but now is a friendless, cynical recluse" but "still possesses a dormant, deep-seated spark of hope that waits for the right person to reignite it." The other is a 10-year-old girl who "comes from a broken home" but "those struggles have only made her stronger — something which will come in handy when darkness threatens everything she holds dear." On March 8, it was announced that Andrew J. West had been cast in the unidentified male role, later revealed in the finale as an adult Henry Mills. On March 9, it was announced that Alison Fernandez had been cast in the unidentified female role, also later revealed in the finale to be Henry's daughter Lucy.

On May 8, 2017, Jennifer Morrison announced that she had declined an offer to remain on the show through season 7 and would not be returning as a series regular in the event the series was renewed by ABC. However, Morrison noted that she had signed a contract to appear in at least one episode in season 7.

On May 12, 2017, showrunners Horowitz and Kitsis confirmed that five more cast members, in addition to Morrison, would not be returning to the show as regulars for a seventh season: Ginnifer Goodwin, Josh Dallas, Jared Gilmore, Emilie de Ravin, and Rebecca Mader. In their personal goodbyes to fans, both de Ravin and Mader cited the show's decision to move forward in a new creative direction as the reason for their departures. Gilmore expressed similar sentiments. Meanwhile, Goodwin and Dallas had informed the showrunners a year prior that they intended to leave the show at the end of the sixth season.

== Ratings ==
Viewership and ratings per episode of Once Upon a Time season 6
No.	Title	Air date	Rating/share (18–49)	Viewers (millions)	DVR (18–49)	DVR viewers (millions)	Total (18–49)	Total viewers (millions)
1	"The Savior"	September 25, 2016	1.3/4	3.99	—N/a	—N/a	—N/a	—N/a
2	"A Bitter Draught"	October 2, 2016	1.1/4	3.72	0.7	—N/a	1.8	—N/a
3	"The Other Shoe"	October 9, 2016	1.2/4	4.11	0.7	—N/a	1.9	—N/a
4	"Strange Case"	October 16, 2016	1.1/4	3.53	—N/a	—N/a	—N/a	—N/a
5	"Street Rats"	October 23, 2016	1.0/3	3.40	0.7	—N/a	1.7	—N/a
6	"Dark Waters"	October 30, 2016	0.9/3	3.06	0.7	1.57	1.6	4.63
7	"Heartless"	November 6, 2016	1.1/3	3.56	0.6	—N/a	1.7	5.2
8	"I'll Be Your Mirror"	November 13, 2016	0.9/3	3.40	0.7	—N/a	1.6	—N/a
9	"Changelings"	November 27, 2016	1.0/3	3.28	0.6	1.46	1.6	4.74
10	"Wish You Were Here"	December 4, 2016	0.9/3	3.27	0.6	—N/a	1.5	—N/a
11	"Tougher Than the Rest"	March 5, 2017	0.9/3	3.03	—N/a	—N/a	—N/a	—N/a
12	"Murder Most Foul"	March 12, 2017	0.9/3	3.06	—N/a	—N/a	—N/a	—N/a
13	"Ill-Boding Patterns"	March 19, 2017	0.8/3	2.71	0.5	1.25	1.3	3.96
14	"Page 23"	March 26, 2017	0.9/3	2.85	—N/a	—N/a	—N/a	—N/a
15	"A Wondrous Place"	April 2, 2017	0.8/3	2.80	—N/a	—N/a	—N/a	—N/a
16	"Mother's Little Helper"	April 9, 2017	0.7/3	2.60	0.5	—N/a	1.2	—N/a
17	"Awake"	April 16, 2017	0.7/3	2.51	0.6	1.19	1.3	3.70
18	"Where Bluebirds Fly"	April 23, 2017	0.8/3	2.69	0.5	—N/a	1.3	—N/a
19	"The Black Fairy"	April 30, 2017	0.9/4	3.05	—N/a	—N/a	—N/a	—N/a
20	"The Song in Your Heart"	May 7, 2017	0.8/3	2.87	—N/a	—N/a	—N/a	—N/a
21–22	"The Final Battle"	May 14, 2017	0.9/4	2.95	—N/a	—N/a	—N/a	—N/a
