= Deniz Akdeniz =

Turkish Australian actor (born 1990)

- Born: 16 May 1990 (age 36); Melbourne, Victoria, Australia
- Education: TAFTA; NIDA; St Martins Youth Theatre; Melbourne Acting Studio
- Occupation: Actor
- Years active: 2005–present

Deniz Akdeniz (born 16 May 1990) is an Australian actor. He starred in the Australian remake of As the Bell Rings, from 2007 to 2009. In 2010, Akdeniz gained wider recognition for his leading role in Stuart Beattie's feature film adaptation of the novel Tomorrow, When the War Began. He then starred in the fantasy horror I, Frankenstein and drama film The Water Diviner (both 2014), before portraying Aladdin in the ABC fantasy series Once Upon a Time (2016–2017).

Akdeniz has since appeared in various film and television projects, including the television series The Flight Attendant (2020–2022) and High Potential (2024–present), and the 2023 independent films You Hurt My Feelings and Dumb Money.

== Early life ==
Akdeniz is of Turkish descent. His parents hail from Izmir, Turkey and when the family emigrated to Australia, they enrolled his older brother in drama classes to help him integrate socially. Akdeniz followed his brother's lead and began performing at the age of eight. He developed his performance skills at The Australian Film and Television Academy (TAFTA), NIDA, St Martins Youth Theatre, and with Bruce Alexander at Melbourne Acting Studio. He made his professional debut in a 2007 production of Angels with Dirty Faces. He was discovered while he was with the Victorian Youth Theatre.

Prior to acting, Akdeniz trained and competed professionally in mixed martial arts. He is a Victorian jiujitsu champion.

== Career ==
Akdeniz's first role was in the Australian film Puppy in 2005. He followed this with a role as Raff on the Disney television series As the Bell Rings from 2007 to 2009.

He was nominated for Best Actor at the 2010 Inside Film Awards for his role as Homer in the film Tomorrow, When the War Began.

In 2014 Akdeniz appeared in I, Frankenstein, and The Water Diviner.

He played a recurring role as Aladdin in season six of the ABC television series Once Upon a Time from 2016 to 2017, and as Robb Wellens on season three of Siren in 2020.

Beginning in 2022 Akdeniz played Max in seasons 1 and 2 of the HBO Max comedic thriller The Flight Attendant.

He appeared in 2022 Australian–American co-production Interceptor, and in 2023 films You Hurt My Feelings and Dumb Money.

He currently plays Lev 'Oz' Ozdil on television series High Potential.

== Personal life ==
Akdeniz married his long term partner, American actress Riley Dandy, in 2024.

He is now based in Los Angeles.

== Filmography ==
=== Film ===
Year	Title	Role	Notes
2005	Puppy	Omar	Feature film
2010	Tomorrow, When the War Began	Homer Yannos	
2013	April Rain	Tariq	
2014	I, Frankenstein	Barachel	
2014	The Water Diviner	Imam	
2020	Sightless	Nurse Omar	
2020	The High Note	Spencer Cliff	
2023	You Hurt My Feelings	Vince	
2023	Dumb Money	Briggsy	

=== Television ===
Year	Title	Role	Notes
2007–2009	As the Bell Rings	Raff	Main cast, 27 episodes
2007	Pass the Plate	Himself	Short series, episode: "Banana"
2008	Disney Channel Games	Himself (Team Inferno)	Short series, 5 episodes
2013	Kristin's Christmas Past	Maverick	TV movie
2014	Graceland	Wayne 'Bates' Zelanski	3 episodes
2015	Perception	Jesse Branson	Episode: "Romeo"
2015	Jessie	Marco	Episode: "Rossed at Sea, Part 2"
2016	Code Black	Manny Petrosian	Episode: "The Fifth Stage"
2016–2017	Once Upon a Time	Aladdin	Recurring role, 7 episodes
2017	Jane the Virgin	Alex	
2017	Agents of S.H.I.E.L.D.	Virgil	Episode: "Orientation: Part 1"
2019	S.W.A.T.	Micah	Episode: "Micah"
2019	For All Mankind	Paul Santoro	Episode: "Red Moon"
2020	Siren	Robb Wellens	Recurring role
2020–2022	The Flight Attendant	Max Park	Recurring role (season 1); Main role (season 2)
2022	The Cleaning Lady	Tarik Bersamian	2 episodes
2022–2023	The Rookie: Feds	Mark Atlas	5 episodes
2024–2025	Ghosts	Chris	4 episodes: "The Polterguest", "Isaac's Wedding", "The Bachelorette Party" & "St Hetty's Day"
2024–current	High Potential	Lev 'Oz' Ozdil	Main role

=== Theatre ===
Year	Title	Role	Notes
2007	Angels with Dirty Faces		Fairfax Studio, Melbourne with 9Minds

=== Video games ===
Year	Title	Role	Notes
2016	Call of Duty: Infinite Warfare	PO1 Dan "Wolf" Lyall	Campaign Mission: "Rising Threat"
2016	Battlefield 1	Matteo Cocchiola	Model

== Awards and nominations ==
Year	Work	Award	Category	Result
2010	Tomorrow When the War Began	Inside Film Awards	Best Actor	Nominated
