= Pilot (Once Upon a Time) =

- Once Upon a Time episode
- Prince Charming watches over Snow White
- Episode no.: Season 1 Episode 1
- Directed by: Mark Mylod
- Written by: Edward Kitsis; Adam Horowitz
- Original air date: October 23, 2011

Guest appearances
- Tony Amendola as Geppetto / Marco; Lee Arenberg as Grumpy/Leroy; Peter Bryant as Jailer; Warren Christie as Ryan Marlow; Beverley Elliott as Granny/Widow Lucas; Meghan Ory as Red Riding Hood/Ruby; Keegan Connor Tracy as Blue Fairy

Episode chronology
← Previous —	Next → "The Thing You Love Most"
- Once Upon a Time season 1

"Pilot" is the series premiere of the American fairy tale/drama television series Once Upon a Time. It introduces each of the main characters in the fictional seaside town of Storybrooke, Maine, as well as establishes the basic premise of the series, which details the beginnings of a curse placed upon the Enchanted Forest and the start of a destiny for its only savior, a present-day woman who can break the curse.

The pilot episode was written by the show's creators, Edward Kitsis and Adam Horowitz, and directed by Mark Mylod. Kitsis and Horowitz sought to write new perspectives of familiar characters, and featured the themes of hope, family and motherhood. The episode sets the template for the rest of the series, as it jumps between the characters' cursed selves in Storybrooke and their original lives in the Enchanted Forest. Every actor first approached for the series accepted after being sent a script; this included Ginnifer Goodwin as Snow White and Jennifer Morrison as Emma Swan.

ABC allowed viewers in the United States to see the episode on the IMDb's website several days before it aired. It premiered in the United States on ABC on October 23, 2011. In Canada, CTV broadcast the episode an hour ahead of ABC's debut, airing it at 7 pm in most regions. The episode received mostly positive reviews and was watched by 12.93 million viewers, scoring a 4.0 rating/11% share in the 18-49 demographic, ranking first in its timeslot. It was ABC's most watched pilot since the pilot episode of Ugly Betty.

== Title card ==
The title card is a slideshow of the following text against a black background, in sequence: "Once Upon A Time / There was an enchanted forest filled with all the classic characters we know. / Or think we know. / One day they found themselves trapped in a place where all their happy endings were stolen. / Our World. / This is how it happened."

== Plot ==
=== In the characters' past ===
Prince Charming (Joshua Dallas) rides to the rescue of Snow White (Ginnifer Goodwin), who is comatose after eating a poisoned apple that was given to her by the Evil Queen (Lana Parrilla). Doc informs Charming that he is too late, but Charming kisses Snow regardless, breaking the curse. On the wedding day of Snow White and Prince Charming, the Evil Queen arrives and delivers an ominous threat about a powerful curse she intends to release upon them. Some time later, a pregnant Snow White is worried about the curse and visits Rumpelstiltskin (Robert Carlyle) in prison, who issues a prophecy that the Queen's curse will take them all someplace terrible where there will be no happy endings. He also reveals that Snow White's unborn daughter Emma will return when she is 28 years old to rescue them, thus beginning a crucial battle with the Queen. Following the Blue Fairy's (Keegan Connor Tracy) advice, Geppetto (Tony Amendola) and Pinocchio (Jakob Davies) fashion a wardrobe from a magical tree which will allow one person to escape the Queen's curse. On the day Snow White gives birth to her daughter, the Queen's curse strikes. Prince Charming places their daughter in the magic wardrobe, but is mortally wounded battling the Queen's henchmen. The Queen stands triumphantly over Snow White and Prince Charming's body, as the Curse takes them "somewhere horrible."

=== In the Present Day ===
==== In Boston ====
In present-day Boston, Emma Swan (Jennifer Morrison) lives a lonely existence working as a bail bondsman and bounty hunter. On her 28th birthday, she is approached by a ten-year-old boy, Henry (Jared S. Gilmore), who identifies himself as her son, whom she had given up for adoption as a teenager. Not wanting a relationship with him, Emma agrees to drive him back to his home in Storybrooke, Maine. Along the way, Henry shows her his large book of fairytales, correctly insisting that all of the stories in it are real. Henry also tries to convince Emma that she is the product of true love and she needs to break a curse the Evil Queen has cast over many fairy tale characters, including her family.

==== In Storybrooke ====
When they arrive in Storybrooke, Henry informs her that everyone in town is in reality a fairy tale character, exiled by the curse and with no memory of their real identities. This includes his therapist Archie Hopper (Raphael Sbarge), who is really Jiminy Cricket, and his teacher Mary Margaret Blanchard (Goodwin), who is really Snow White. Henry claims that time is frozen in Storybrooke and the people are unable to leave, but that the curse will be broken by Emma. A skeptical Emma returns Henry to his adopted mother, the town Mayor, Regina (Parrilla), who is really the Evil Queen. Emma attempts to leave but after having drunk apple cider given to her by the Mayor and nearly hitting a wolf she has a car accident where she is knocked out. While unconscious, she is arrested and taken to Storybrooke Jail for supposedly drunk driving. When Henry runs away again, Emma makes a deal with the Mayor and Sheriff Graham (Jamie Dornan): if they release her, she will find him. After exhausting all possibilities she speaks with Mary Margaret, who tells Emma to "Check his castle." After finding Henry at a wooden jungle gym (which bears a resemblance to Prince Charming's castle), they talk and Emma decides to stay in Storybrooke temporarily, especially after Regina warns her to leave town. This leads Emma to be suspicious of the mayor's motives.

Shortly after her conversation with Emma, Mary Margaret volunteers at Storybrooke Hospital, placing flowers at the bedside of patients. She stops in the ICU where a John Doe (Dallas) is sleeping in a coma. Mary Margaret is unaware of who he is. Meanwhile, at the Mayor's home, Regina takes the book from Henry's room and goes downstairs to look at her mirror, with an expression that seems to acknowledge she is aware of her fairy tale existence.

As Emma arrives at Granny's Bed & Breakfast, she is given a key to her room by the elderly proprietor (Beverley Elliot) and her estranged granddaughter Ruby (Meghan Ory), who are actually the Grandmother and Little Red Riding Hood respectively. They are followed by a man who came to collect money: Mr. Gold (Carlyle), who helped build and owns the entire town, and is actually Rumpelstiltskin. When Emma mentions her name, Mr. Gold pauses as if he knew something about her. Emma's decision to stay in Storybrooke causes the hands of the town clock, previously frozen at 8:15, to begin moving again, indicating that the Dark Curse is beginning to weaken, as Henry watches from his room, smiling.

== Production ==
=== Pre-production ===
On February 1, 2011, ABC ordered six new pilots for their 2011–2012 television schedule, which included Once Upon a Time. The premiere episode was co-written by series co-creators Edward Kitsis and Adam Horowitz, and was directed by Mark Mylod. Mylod, a veteran of the Showtime drama Shameless, signed on to direct in mid-February 2011. The network picked up Once Upon a Time and six other drama series on May 13, 2011.

=== Writing ===
The idea is to take these characters that we all know collectively and try to find things about them that we haven't explored before. Sometimes it's a story point, sometimes it's a thematic connection, sometimes it's a dilemma they face in both worlds that is similar. We are not generally retelling the exact same story as the fairy tale world.

— Executive producer Adam Horowitz

Eight years previous to the Once Upon a Time pilot (the two had just completed their work on Felicity, in 2002), Kitsis and Horowitz became inspired to write fairytales out of a love of "mystery and excitement of exploring lots of different worlds." They presented the premise to networks, but were refused because of its fantastical nature. The two learned from their time on Lost to look at the story in a different way, that "character has to trump mythology"; they expanded, "as people, you've got to see what the void in their heart or in their lives is to care about them... For us, this was as much about the character journeys and seeing what was ripped from them in coming to Storybrooke – going at it that way as opposed to making it the 'break-the-curse show.'" Despite the comparisons and similarities to Lost, the writers intend them to be very different shows. To them, Lost concerned itself with redemption, while Once Upon a Time is about "hope". Lost co-creator Damon Lindelof aided in the development of the series as a consultant, but had no official credit for the pilot.

To differentiate the storytelling from what the audience already knew, the writing staff decided to begin the pilot with the end of the typical Snow White fairytale. Themes concerning family and motherhood were emphasized, in contrast to the focus on fatherhood in Lost. Kitsis and Horowitz sought to write strong female characters, rather than the classic damsel in distress. Horowitz stated their desire to approach each character the same way, asking themselves, "How do we make these icons real, make them relatable?"

The pilot is meant to be the "template of the series". Kitsis confirmed that every week will contain flashbacks between both worlds, as they "love the idea of going back and forth and informing what the character is missing in their life." The writers' desire to present a "mash up" of many small characters can be seen in a scene of the pilot, in which there is a war council featuring Geppetto, Pinocchio, and Grumpy. Horowitz elaborated, "One of the fun things for us coming up with these stories is thinking of ways these different characters can interact in ways they never have before."

=== Casting ===
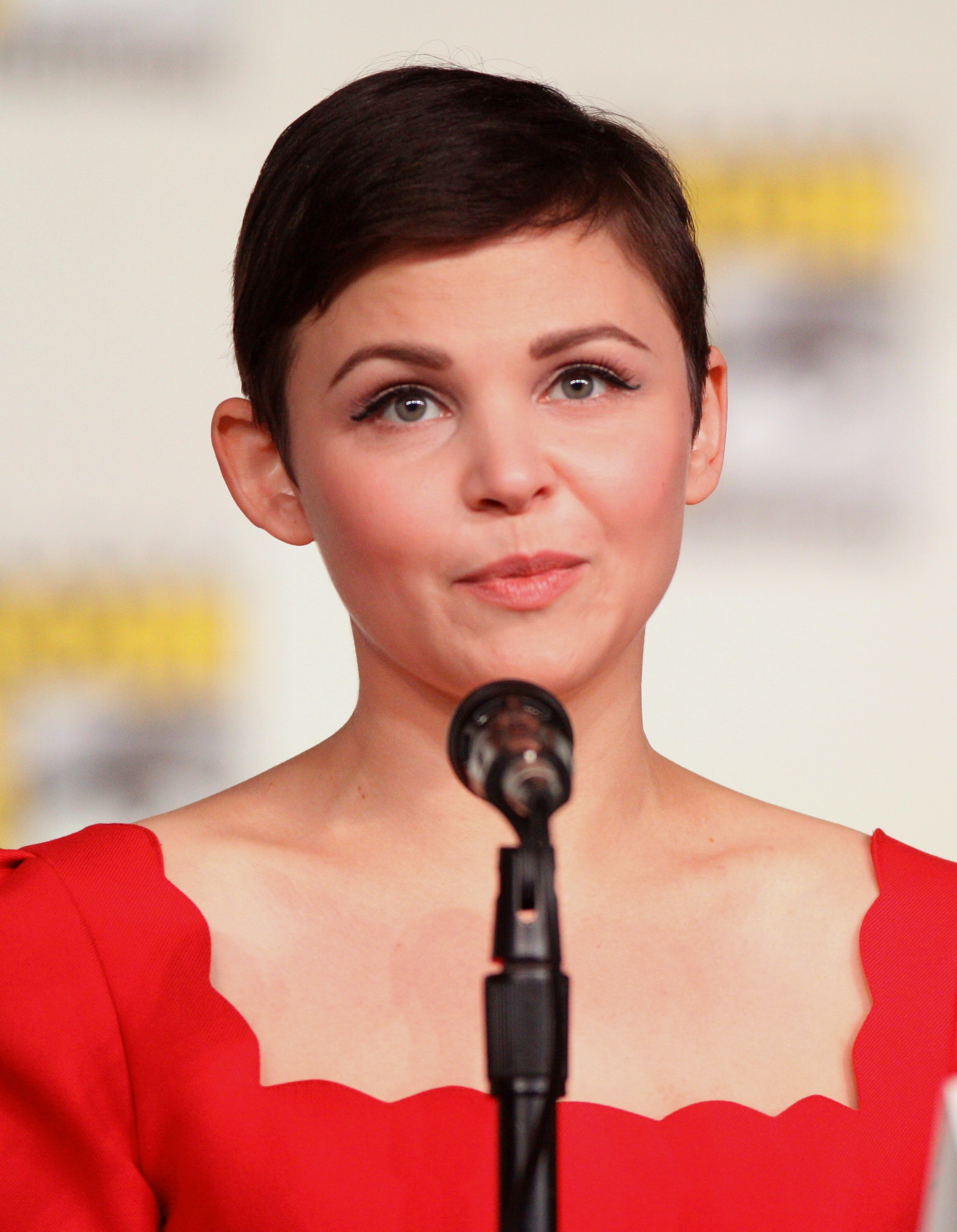
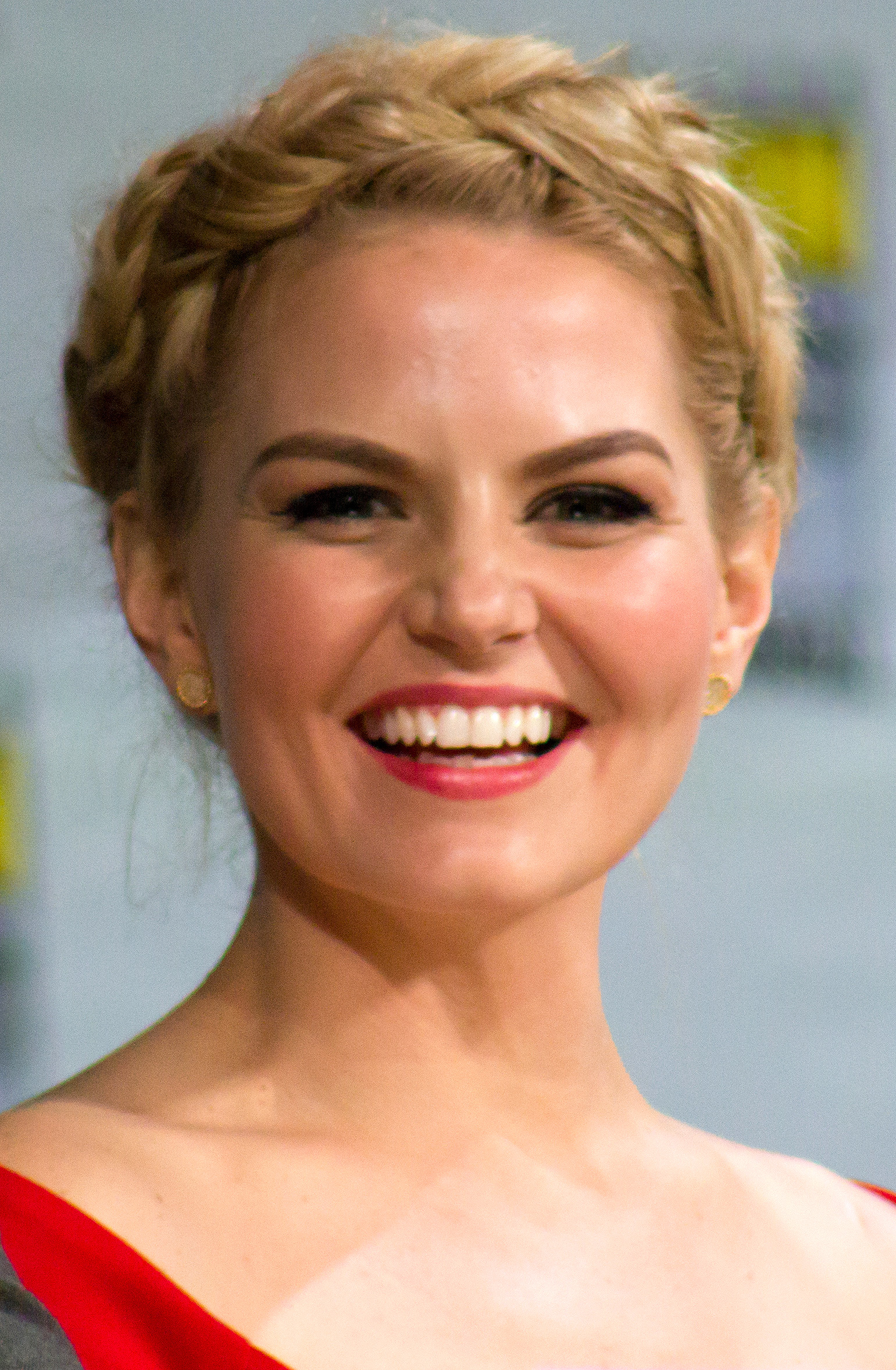
Ginnifer Goodwin (left) and Jennifer Morrison play mother and daughter Snow White and Emma Swan. The two actresses were often mistaken for each other early in their careers.

Horowitz stated that everyone they initially wanted cast in the series accepted their offered role after being sent a script. Ginnifer Goodwin was cast as Snow White, who appreciated that she would be playing a strong character that was fleshed out for the audience. The actress had just completed her work on the series Big Love, and was looking for a new project; she turned to television after film scripts failed to interest her. Having said previously in interviews that she would love to play Snow White, Goodwin called her acceptance of the role "a no-brainer." Both Kitsis and Horowitz are self-described big fans of Big Love, and wrote the part of Snow White with Goodwin in mind.

Joshua Dallas, who plays Prince Charming, was pleased the writers took "some dramatic license" with his character, believing the prince had become more real. He explained, "Prince Charming just happens to be a name. He's still a man with the same emotions as any other man. He's a Prince, but he's a Prince of the people. He gets his hands dirty. He's got a kingdom to run. He has a family to protect. He has an epic, epic love for Snow White. He's like everybody else. He's human." Jennifer Morrison was hired for the part of Emma Swan. The actress explained her character as someone who "help[s] this kid who seems like he's a little bit emotionally dysfunctional," but noted that Emma does not yet believe there is a fairytale universe. Ten-year-old Jared Gilmore, known for his work on Mad Men, took the role of her son, Henry.

The role of the Evil Queen/Regina went to Lana Parrilla. She explained the character, "There's always two stories being told when playing Regina. There's the threat of her knowing she's an evil queen and then there's just the pure simple fact that the biological mother has stepped into her world and the threat of losing her son is just enormous. That's a fear that I think any adopted mother would have. I think that's going to really help the audience relate to Regina in some level." The role of Rumpelstiltskin was given to Robert Carlyle; it was written with Carlyle in mind, though the writers initially thought he would never accept the part. Horowitz recalled Carlyle's prison sequence, which was the actor's first day on the set as "mind-blowing... You could see Ginny actually jump, the first time he did that character. It was fantastic!" The writers offered the part of the Blue Fairy to recording artist Lady Gaga, but never heard back from her management staff.

=== Visual effects ===
Executive producer Steve Pearlman referred to Once Upon a Time as "an effects-heavy show," but in ways that are not meant to be obvious to viewers. Zoic Studios provided the visual effects seen in the pilot, building virtual sets for the fairy tale sequences and using F/X for action scenes. Production and visual effects staff collaborated under a difficult schedule and limited budget. The studio has used the technology Zoic's Environmental Unification System (Z.E.U.S.) for real time camera tracking, allowing for creative flexibility among the cast and crew, who work on a green screen stage. Andrew Orloff, Zoic's Executive Creative Director, commented "Once Upon A Time is an amazing creative opportunity for Zoic. The highly detailed environments and imaginative characters of the series' fairy tale world have challenged us to expand and fine-tune both our Z.E.U.S. and animation pipelines for television."

Zoic Studios digitally reproduced the war room and ballroom castle interiors based on concept designs created by Art Director Mark Worthington. For the wedding scene, Zoic staff extended columns, added stained glass windows, and completed the wedding party with additions of digital guests. The effect of the Evil Queen disappearing from Charming's flying sword cost ABC a reported $12,000. Kitsis has commented that because the network has been very supportive, they are not worried about losing the "fantastical feel" of the series' flashback sequences. He explained, "We can't show this pilot and then have a cheap show after it, so it's our goal to maintain this level of production values throughout." Zoic visual effects will continue to be used for future episodes.

=== Marketing ===
On October 14, 2011 – nine days before the national broadcast date – Kitsis and Horowitz presented an early screening of the pilot episode at a New York Comic Con panel and answered questions from fans. Later, viewers were able to stream the entire pilot episode from the IMDb in advance of its broadcast.

The pilot episode aired in October rather than September, which was a month after new fall season shows normally premiered. Pearlman was pleased with the later broadcast date, believing that "it creates a second wave of anticipation for an audience, too. I work in the business and I couldn't even tell you the names of a third of the new shows this season because we were bombarded with all the messaging."

The episode was included in Reawakened: A Once Upon a Time Tale – a novelization of the first season – which was published by Hyperion Books in 2013.

=== Cultural references ===
The pilot contained a number of popular culture references noted by viewers and television critics. There were several references to Lost, another series scripted by episode writers Kitsis and Horowitz. The street address of Regina's home is 108, the town clock is stuck at 8:15 (the same number as the doomed airline flight in the aforementioned series), there is a Geronimo Jackson bumper sticker on Emma's car, the smoke monster engulfing the Enchanted Forest, and Emma's eye-opening after she wakes up. Kitsis noted of the references, "[Lost co-creator] Damon [Lindelof] has been a godfather to us. His name is not on the show, but he is in the DNA of it." Horowitz also stated their intention to continue making Lost references in the future.

Snow White and Prince Charming use a powerfully magical wardrobe to transport their new-born baby to a different universe (our own "real world"). In The Lion, the Witch and the Wardrobe, the first volume of C. S. Lewis's Narnia series, a similarly powerful magical wardrobe transports the main characters between the real world and the magical universe of Narnia.

Another cultural reference appeared in a scene when Emma hears Leroy (who is actually Grumpy) whistling Whistle While You Work (the song used in the 1937 film version of Snow White and the Seven Dwarfs), indicating its acknowledged ties to Disney, whose subsidiary ABC Studios also happens to be the production company behind Once Upon a Time, since Disney has allowed them access to their fairy tale characters and properties for use in the series. "They've given us license," Kitsis said. "I could be wrong, but I think this is the first time anyone's shown Snow White with a sword, or pregnant." Other Disney references include the blue star candle Emma wishes on, nodding to the scene in the 1940 film version of Pinocchio where Pinocchio wishes on a blue star and his wish is granted by the Blue Fairy (both of whom also make a brief appearance alongside Jiminy Cricket in this episode).

The Black Keys' song "Howlin' for You" is featured in Emma's introduction scene.

== Reception ==
=== Ratings ===
Premiering out of its 8:00 pm timeslot after America's Funniest Videos, the pilot was viewed by an estimated 12.93 million viewers and received a 4.0 rating/11% share among adults between the ages of 18 and 49. As a result, It was the season's highest rated drama debut among adults 18-49 and ABC's biggest debut in five years. It competed against The World Series Pre-Game on FOX, Football Night In America on NBC and The Amazing Race on CBS. It also competed against some of Sunday Night Football. Including DVR ratings, the episode totaled 15.48 million viewers and a 5.2 18-49 rating.

In Canada, CTV debuted the series an hour ahead of ABC's debut, airing it at 7 pm in all regions except in Saskatchewan and Winnipeg, where it debuted at 10 pm. The pilot was watched by 1.764 million viewers, placing 14th for the week. In the UK, the pilot aired on Channel 5 on a 9 pm slot and pulled in 2.36 million viewers, the highest throughout the week of April 9, 2012 for the channel.

=== Reviews ===
"Pilot" received mostly positive reviews from television critics.

In a review from Zap2it, Rick Porter gave the pilot praise for bringing together the central theme, saying "No other new show this fall is attempting to tell a bigger story, and we're hoping the rough patches smooth out and it fulfills the potential that's there in its very strong cast and premise." It also cited Jennifer Morrison and Jared Gilmore's performances when they appear in scenes together: "As such it falls to Morrison to move the story along in this world, and fortunately for the audience she's able to pull it off. She gives a confident, grounded performance that helps keep the show from feeling too fantastical, and her rapport with Gilmore is a big plus too." He also notes the writers and producers have put together a great premise and expects they'll have more as the series progresses: "Given the cast and the people involved behind the scenes... we're more optimistic than not that Once Upon a Time will find its way. But if it doesn't, at least it will go down swinging."

The New York Times writer Mike Hale compared Once Upon a Time with the similarly premised series Grimm, believing that the former has a "richer premise and more interesting characters." Hale in particular praised Goodwin and Morrison's performances, but concluded, "Watching the pilot again, though, it became harder to ignore the soap opera underpinnings and the twee sentimentality." IGN's Amy Ratcliffe gave the episode an 8.0/10 rating, praising the casting, acting, and writing. While acknowledging there were "a few cheesy" moments, she expressed hope that the series would remain focused on its story rather than on too many special effects.

TV Fanatic's Christine Orlando gave the episode 4.4 out of 5 stars, calling it "a beautiful, stunning, magical journey" and saying that she was "hooked from the opening scene." She complimented the whole cast, but especially Robert Carlyle, saying that he made "a perfectly creepy Rumpelstiltskin." She praised the character of Henry, saying, "He's spunky, intelligent and has just the right amount of persistence, and faith in fantasy to make you want to believe." She concluded by simply stating that it was "very, very good."

== Cast ==
=== Starring ===
- Ginnifer Goodwin as Snow White/Mary Margaret Blanchard
- Jennifer Morrison as Emma Swan
- Lana Parrilla as Evil Queen
- Josh Dallas as Prince Charming/Unconscious Man
- Jared S. Gilmore as Henry Mills
- Raphael Sbarge as Jiminy Cricket (voice)/Archie Hopper
- Jamie Dornan as Sheriff
- Robert Carlyle as Rumplestiltskin/Mr. Gold

=== Guest Starring ===
- Tony Amendola as Geppetto/Marco
- Lee Arenberg as Grumpy/Leroy
- Peter Bryant as Jailer
- Warren Christie as Ryan Marlow
- Beverley Elliot as Granny/Widow Lucas
- Meghan Ory as Red Riding Hood/Ruby
- Keegan Connor Tracy as Blue Fairy

=== Co-Starring ===
- James Bamford as Black Knight
- Michael Coleman as Happy
- Keith Dallas as Cabbie
- Jakob Davies as Pinocchio
- Faustino di Bauda as Sleepy
- Darla Fay as Old Woman
- David-Paul Grove as Doc
- Jeffrey Kaiser as Dopey
- Gabe Khouth as Sneezy
- Mig Macario as Bashful
- Tom Pickett as Bishop

=== Uncredited ===
- Cinder as Pongo
- Tasha as Emma
