= Karen David =

Canadian actress, singer-songwriter (born 1979)

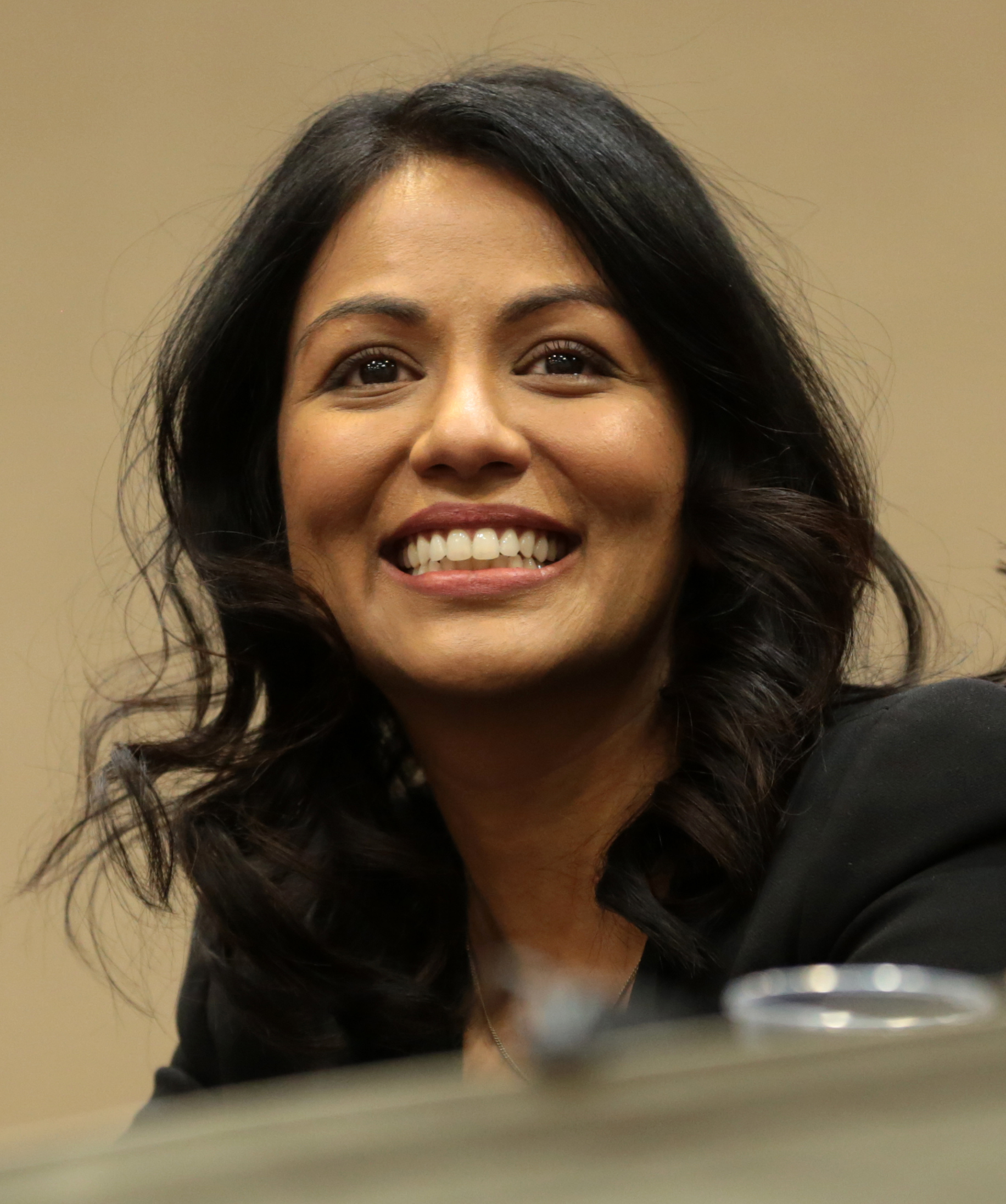
- David in 2017

Background information
- Born: 15 April 1979 (age 47); Shillong, Meghalaya, India
- Genre: Pop
- Occupations: Actress, singer, songwriter
- Instrument: Vocals
- Years active: 1999–present
- Label: AWAL

Karen Shenaz David (born 15 April 1979) is a Canadian and British actress, singer, and songwriter, best known for portraying Princess Isabella Maria Lucia Elizabetta of Valencia in ABC's fairytale-themed musical-comedy television series Galavant, as well as the Head of Spanish, Cesca Montoya, in the BBC One school-based drama series Waterloo Road, and Layla in the American action film The Scorpion King 2: Rise of a Warrior. She starred as Angela in the ITV television series Cold Feet, and played Princess Jasmine/Shirin in the sixth season of Once Upon a Time.

She had a recurring role on The CW's Legacies as Emma, a guidance counselor and witch, and played regular character Grace Mukherjee in Fear the Walking Dead.

She has had a recurring role as former MI6 agent Rose Dinshaw on NBC's The Irrational.

== Early life ==
David was born in Shillong, Meghalaya, India, to a family of "Khasi and a sliver of Jewish heritage". Her mother is of Khasi-Indian descent, while her father is Indian-Jewish. She was raised in Canada and then at age 17, David moved to Britain to study at the Guildford School of Acting. She then moved back to Canada for a time in the late 1990s, studying radio and television arts at Ryerson University in Toronto.

== Career ==
=== Acting ===
Upon finishing drama school, David joined the original cast of the West End musical Mamma Mia!. She made her professional acting debut as part of the ensemble and as understudy of Ali and Lisa. A. R. Rahman, who had been invited to see the show by the director Shekhar Kapur, asked David to assist him and Don Black in the development of the material for the Bollywood-themed musical Bombay Dreams. She performed songs on the show's US and Canada tour, and continued collaborating with Rahman at his Panchathan Record Inn and AM Studios in Chennai, India.

She appeared in the music clip "Higher & Higher" (2000) and in two short television videos, Dancers: The Trailer (2002), playing the role of Jenny, and The Paper Round (2002), playing the role of a policewoman. She then landed a role in the musical Bollywood Queen (2003), as a member of the R&B band at the story's center. Through 2004 and 2005, she played Scarlet in MTV's Top Buzzer.

David played Lyla, a main character in the London-based film Take 3 Girls (2006). Other work during this time includes Steven Seagal's Flight of Fury (2007) as Barnes' Operational Soldier Flanders, The Colour of Magic (2008) as Liessa, the Dragonlady, and The Legend of Dick and Dom (2009) as Fairy Frampton. David appeared as the female lead, Layla, in The Scorpion King 2: Rise of a Warrior (2008), filmed in Cape Town, South Africa.

In September 2010, David played the Spanish teacher, Francesca "Cesca" Montoya, in series six of BBC One's drama, Waterloo Road. While Waterloo Road was still airing, David landed the role of legend hunter Alexia Alderton in Pixelface, a CBBC children's comedy series about six video game characters and what they do when they are not inside their games. The second series aired on 3 January 2012.

David appeared on American television with a guest role on the Fox series Touch in 2012, playing Kayla Graham. On the episode she performed the song "Three Little Birds", which was then released as a soundtrack single with Wendy & Lisa by 20th Century Fox TV Records on 28 February 2012.

In February 2013, David appeared in the two-part episode "Target" of the ABC TV series Castle, in the USA. David played Sara El-Masri, daughter of Egyptian tycoon, Anwar El-Masri. Whilst filming these episodes, David and a stuntman were injured when the door to the moving van they were in failed to close properly. David was placed in a neck brace, while the stuntman sustained serious head injuries.

David has reappeared on US televisions, as "Princess Isabella Maria Lucia Elizabetta of Valencia", in the ABC television series Galavant, which premiered on 4 January 2015, for a four-week extravaganza.

In 2019, David joined the cast of Fear the Walking Dead as Grace Mukherjee and stayed with the series until the start of the final season.

=== Music ===
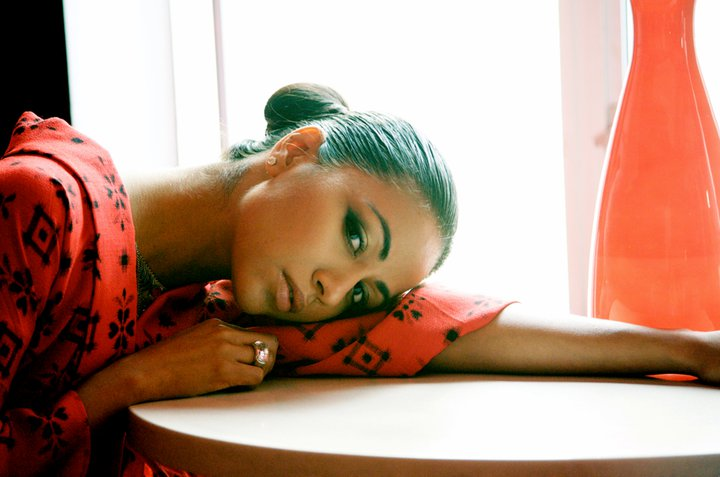

David released her first single, "It's Me (You're Talking To)", in 2003, when she was signed to BMG Music. This single was a top 10 airplay hit in Germany, Austria and Switzerland.

She collaborated with A. R. Rahman on the main theme song for the film Provoked in 2006. After working alongside Rahman to produce the soundtrack for this movie, she found herself back with him in his Chennai studio, in 2007, to write and record the song, "Alive". The following year she released her first EP, The Live Sessions EP. In 2009 she released her next EP, Magic Carpet Ride.

In May 2010, David released the single "Hypnotize", alongside three mixes and a Hypnotize Desi Mix EP. The following year she released the album The Girl in the Pink Glasses. 20th Century Fox TV Records released "Three Little Birds", as sung by Kayla Graham (David), on Touch, on 28 February 2012.

In 2013, David released her final personal recording to-date, the EP Dust to Stars, on which she collaborated with songwriter-producers Stefan Skarbek, Carl Ryden, Boots Ottestad, Adam Argyle and Martin Brammer. Since then, she has been a member of the 2015 and 2016 cast soundtracks for Galavant.

== Charity work ==
David is active in Designers Against Aids and the SOS Children's Villages Foundation.

She produced a T-shirt to raise money for ActionAid's PoverTee Day, which was auctioned off on 18 June 2010. In December 2010, David released a charity Christmas EP, My Christmas List, to raise money for the housing and homelessness charity Shelter.

Alongside others, David painted a self-portrait to help raise funds for Face Britain, a project of The Prince's Trust Foundation.

== Personal life ==
In 2013, she married Swedish songwriter and music producer Carl Ryden, at La Venta Inn in Palos Verdes Peninsula, California.

== Filmography ==
Film
Year	Title	Role
2003	Bollywood Queen	Neeta
2005	Batman Begins	Courthouse Reporter No. 1
2006	Take 3 Girls	Lyla
2006	Provoked	Asha
2007	Flight of Fury	Barnes's Operational Soldier Flanders
2008	The Scorpion King 2: Rise of a Warrior	Layla
2008	The Colour of Magic	Liessa
2009	Couples Retreat	Spa Attendant
2012	Red Lights	Dana
2014	Jack Ryan: Shadow Recruit	Penn
2015	Amar, Akbar & Tony	Meera
2016	The Tiger Hunter	Ruby Iqbal
2022	Land of Gold	Asha
2022	When Christmas Was Young	Melody Douglass
2024	Isabel's Garden	Maya

Television
Year	Title	Role	Notes
2003	Holby City	Eve Hotton	1 episode
2004	Top Buzzer	Scarlet	1 episode
2009	The Legend of Dick and Dom	Fairy Frampton	1 episode
2010–2011	Waterloo Road	Francesca "Cesca" Montoya	Main cast; 20 episodes (series 6)
2011	Strike Back: Project Dawn	Barmaid	2 episodes
2011–2012	Pixelface	Alexia	Main cast; 26 episodes
2012	Touch	Kayla Graham	1 episode
2013	Castle	Sara El-Masri	2 episodes
2015–2016	Galavant	Princess Isabella	Main cast
2016–2017	Once Upon a Time	Princess Jasmine	Recurring role; 9 episodes
2016	Cold Feet	Angela Zubayr	
2018	Criminal Minds	Special Agent Mary Meadows	2 episodes
2018–2022	Barry	Sharon Lucado	4 episodes
2018–2021	Legacies	Emma Tig	Recurring role (seasons 1–2); Guest role (seasons 3–4)
2018	Timeless	Young Denise Christopher	Episode: "The Day Reagan Was Shot"
2019–2023	Fear the Walking Dead	Grace Mukherjee	Main cast (seasons 5–8); 28 episodes
2019–2020	The Rookie	Detective Rita Calderon	2 episodes
2020–2022	Mira, Royal Detective	Shilpa, Ashima and Rubi (voice)	Recurring roles
2023–2025	The Irrational	Rose Dinshaw	11 episodes
2025	We Were Liars	Maya	Episode: When Lies Give You Lemons
2026	Tracker	Dr. Evie Martell	Episode: Do No Harm

TV/Video shorts
Year	Title	Role	Notes
2002	Dancers: The Trailer	Jenny	
2002	The Paper Round	Police Woman	

Video games
Year	Title	Role	Notes
2016	Dead Rising 4	Vicky "Vick" Chu	Voice role
2016	Mirror's Edge Catalyst	Isabel Kruger	Voice role
2024	Call of Duty: Black Ops 6	Sevati Dumas	Voice role and performance capture
2025	Ghost of Yōtei	Huci The Shaman	

Other
Year	Title	Role	Notes
2003	The Making of Bollywood Queen (video documentary)	Herself	
2005	Eureka (commercial)	Police Woman	
2008	The Making of The Scorpion King 2: The Rise of a Warrior (video documentary short)	Herself	

== Music videos ==
=== Music videos ===
Date	Song title
2000	Higher and Higher on YouTube
2003	It's Me (You're Talking To)
Jun 2007	Alive
Jun 2009	Magic Carpet Ride on YouTube
Apr 2010	Hypnotize on YouTube
Jun 2011	Superheroes on YouTube
July 2013	Daydreamer on YouTube
Aug 2013	Dust to Stars on YouTube

=== Remixes/radio edits ===
Year	Song title
Jul 2009	Magic Carpet Ride : Radio edit on YouTube
Jul 2009	Magic Carpet Ride : Flavasia Desi Mix on YouTube
Sep 2010	Hypnotize : The Definitive Radio Mix on YouTube
Sep 2010	Hypnotize : The Almighty Mix on YouTube
