= Sympathy for the De Vil =

- Once Upon a Time episode
- Episode no.: Season 4 Episode 18
- Directed by: Romeo Tirone
- Written by: David H. Goodman & Jerome Schwartz
- Production code: 418
- Original air date: April 19, 2015

Guest appearances
- Kristin Bauer van Straten as Maleficent; Victoria Smurfit as Cruella de Vil/Cruella Feinberg; Patrick Fischler as the Author/Isaac Heller; Anna Galvin as Madeline (Cruella's mother); Milli Wilkinson as Young Cruella

Episode chronology
← Previous "Heart of Gold"	Next → "Lily"
- Once Upon a Time season 4

"Sympathy for the De Vil" is the eighteenth episode of the fourth season of the American fantasy drama series Once Upon a Time, which aired on April 19, 2015.

In this episode, a young Cruella de Vil is tortured by her mother's evil use of her Dalmatians, resulting in her eventual confinement to her attic until a strange visitor tells her she should stand up to her mother. In Storybrooke, Regina's plan to save Robin are put on hold when Henry is taken by Cruella, teaming her up with Emma Swan to save their son.

== Title card ==
Dalmatian puppies running through the forest.

== Plot ==
=== Event chronology ===
- The 1920s England events takes place a few years after Isaac became the Author in "Operation Mongoose".
- The Storybrooke events takes place after "Heart of Gold".

=== In the Characters' Past ===
In 1920s England, a young Cruella De Vil is being mistreated by her mother Madeline as she instructs her Dalmatians to chase her daughter, and is locked in the attic in the same setting that resembles the novel Flowers in the Attic.

Fast forward to several years later, and that a reporter, who is revealed to be the Author but is using an alias by the name of Isaac, is paying a visit to the home pretending to seek out a story after having seen Cruella from the attic, only to have Madeline warning him to stay away. Isaac returns and helps Cruella escape from the attic. He then takes Cruella out for a date that includes dinner and dancing. Cruella reveals to Isaac that the reason she was kept in the attic was that she witnessed her mother kill her father and her succeeding husbands; Isaac then reveals to Cruella that he was more than just a reporter and has the ability to use his pen and ink to create magical stories. Isaac proposes that they run away together, and uses his quill and ink to give Cruella her persuasion powers to control animals.

However, for Isaac, his future with Cruella would later take a unique twist that will put his future in danger. When Madeline pays a visit to see him, she tells him that Cruella had lied to him about what actually happened to her husbands: Cruella was a disturbed child psychopath who killed them, not Madeline, who was trying to prevent her from killing others by locking her away. When Madeline returns home, Cruella was ready for her, and eventually kills her mother by controlling her Dalmatians and commanding them to attack her. Afterwards, Isaac realized his quill was missing, so he pays a visit to see Cruella and is stunned that she used him as a means to an end, and Cruella used the skin from her mother's dogs as fur for her signature coat. The confrontation lead the two to fight over the ink, which is then spilled on Cruella, transforming her into the infamous black & white infused-hair character. As Cruella is about to kill him, Issac uses his powers as the Author to make it so that Cruella can never kill anyone ever again by writing it down on a piece of paper. As he leaves, Cruella tells him she's not done.

=== In Storybrooke ===
As Cruella races off into the forest, she is stopped in her tracks by Maleficent, who now knows that she was the one who knew where Lily went after they were sucked into the portal back in the Enchanted Forest. As Maleficent transforms into a dragon, Cruella uses her breath to exhale green smoke and puts her frenemy to sleep, then comes up with a plan to go after the Author. Meanwhile, Emma Swan is still arguing with Mary Margaret and David when Regina informs them about Zelena, prompting her to see Belle, who in turn interrupts Gold's plan to make the Author write stories, which in turn prompts Gold to come to the well to see her, and he reveals that his heart is darkening and he will die, only to discover that Belle is being controlled by Regina, who is using Belle's heart to make sure that Gold does not contact Zelena as Regina schemes to go to New York to confront her half-sister.

Cruella then pays a visit to Isaac to make up for lost time and to offer him a deal, as Gold does not know that they knew each other as Isaac catches on to her deception. And since Isaac knows that Cruella has no power to kill anyone, Cruella, who tells Isaac that there are other ways to "skin an author," finds a way to make it happen by kidnapping Henry by using a controlled Pongo, which she uses to force both Emma and Regina to do her bidding by making the mothers kill Isaac or else Cruella will kill Henry. As Gold returns to the cabin, he tells Isaac that he knew about his past with Cruella and informs Isaac about the kidnapping, which Gold knows will lead to Emma's darkness. Isaac then hands Gold a note he kept from the club.

At the apartment, Emma, Regina, Hook, Mary Margaret and David discuss their plan of action but even this has Emma concerned. Regina, Emma and Hook search the woods just in time for Henry to escape from Cruella (while she is playing Angry Birds), but as the three split up and only Regina and Hook are tricked by seashells planted by Gold, it's Emma who finds Henry, but Cruella is threatening to throw Henry off of the cliff, then tempts Emma's patience to see if she will do it, reminding her that heroes never kill. At the same time, Mary Margaret and David confront Isaac, who reveals that a chapter in Emma's future will involve her turning dark and they race to stop her upon reading the note that revealed that Cruella is incapable of killing anyone. They arrive just in time to see Emma use her powers and kill Cruella by knocking her off the cliff. As a terrified Henry cries in his mother's arms, Emma's face has changed to a sinister look, implying that her heart is going dark.

== Cultural references ==
- The episode's title is a reference to the Rolling Stones song "Sympathy for the Devil".
- This episode is a rendition of The Hundred and One Dalmatians, with Cruella De Vil and Pongo.
- The song that Cruella hears on the radio is a jazz instrumental version of "Cruella de Vil", from the 1961 Disney animated movie One Hundred and One Dalmatians.
- Madeline's car is similar in design and color to Cruella's car in 1961 Disney animated movie One Hundred and One Dalmatians.

== Reception ==
=== Ratings ===
The episode held steady from the previous episode, as it posted a 1.6/5 among 18-49s with 5.12 million viewers tuning in, retaining its lead among scripted programs in the 8 p.m. timeslot despite coming in second behind the Academy of Country Music Awards on CBS during that hour.

=== Reviews ===
The episode was met with positive reviews.

Hilary Busis of Entertainment Weekly noted "The thing about a show that specializes in twisted fairy tales is that sooner or later, those watching it will learn to expect the twists. Which meant that, halfway through tonight's episode, it was only natural to grow suspicious. The backstory we'd been given so far about Cruella de Vil—that once upon a time, she was an innocent, wide-eyed blonde completely at the mercy of her wicked, ultra-controlling mother—just seemed a little, well, familiar. Give or take a flapper dress and a pair of Dalmatians, her past looked remarkably like Regina's and Ursula's, for that matter. (Once does love its daddy/mommy issue stories, doesn't it?) Which meant that one of two things was happening: Either the show was really repeating itself almost to the letter, or things were about to take a right turn into Crazy Town (Not that one). Thankfully for everything, Once went with Option 2."

Amy Ratcliffe of IGN said of the episode, "Overall, this week's Once Upon a Time made Cruella a stronger villain by giving her a twisted backstory. This is someone who doesn't have a softer side, and it's a nice change. She's unapologetic and cruel. Though there were clunky aspects in the episode, they expanded the mythology of the world and the Author's role as well as adding another layer to Rumplestiltskin's motivations." Ratcliffe gave the episode a 7.3 rating out of 10.

In a review from Rickey.org, Nick Roman cites "I was probably too quick to judge last week's Once Upon a Time. One of the things that occasionally bugs me about the narrative for this season, and which "Sympathy for the De Vil" happily corrects, is this idea that every villain has a kernel of goodness in them. Cruella de Vil (Victoria Smurfit) is bad all the way through, and the show is better for it."
