= There's No Place Like Home (Once Upon a Time) =

- Once Upon a Time episode
- Episode no.: Season 3 Episode 22
- Directed by: Ralph Hemecker
- Written by: Edward Kitsis & Adam Horowitz
- Production code: 322
- Original air date: May 11, 2014

Guest appearances
- Sean Maguire as Robin Hood; Lee Arenberg as Leroy/Grumpy; Keegan Connor Tracy as The Blue Fairy/Mother Superior; Meghan Ory as Ruby/Red; Raphael Sbarge as Archie Hopper/Jiminy Cricket; Beverley Elliott as Granny; Sarah Bolger as Aurora; David-Paul Grove as Doc; Gabe Khouth as Sneezy; Faustino Di Bauda as Sleepy; Jeffrey Kaiser as Dopey; Mig Macario as Bashful; Eric Keenleyside as Sir Maurice/Moe French; Raphael Alejandro as Roland; Christie Laing as Maid Marian

Episode chronology
| ← Previous "Snow Drifts" | Next → "A Tale of Two Sisters" |
- Once Upon a Time (season 3)

"There's No Place Like Home" is episode twenty-two of the third season of the American fantasy drama series Once Upon a Time, and the show's 66th episode overall, which aired on May 11, 2014. The episode serves as the conclusion of a two-part season finale with "Snow Drifts", written by series creators Edward Kitsis & Adam Horowitz, and directed by Ralph Hemecker.

Commentators responded positively to the episode, commenting mainly on Jennifer Morrison's role, the time-travel storyline as a whole, and the introduction of a central character for the fourth season.

Upon airing, the episode was watched by 6.80 million viewers and attained an 18-49 rating of 2.3, placing first in its timeslot and first for the night.

== Title card ==
The original broadcast showed a new set of graphics highlights the "O" of the series title as a mirror with a swan in the Enchanted Forest.

Later broadcasts showed a time travel wormhole portal opening in the Enchanted Forest.

== Plot ==
=== In the characters' past ===
In 2001 Portland, Oregon, Emma Swan and Neal Cassidy are on a date at an amusement park after hours, where Neal picks a lock and the two sneak in to sit down on a swing ride. Neal then opens up to Emma about his past, and about home, telling her it is a place that you cannot shake, and that you just miss.

=== In the Enchanted Forest's new past ===
As the story continues from the previous episode, Emma sees the woman across from her in the cell as the same woman who was arrested for helping Snow, and learns that they are both due to be executed immediately the next day. Using her tricks from the night Neal broke into the amusement park, Emma remembers she knows how to break a lock by using two spoons, and it works. Later on, Charming catches Snow in the rope trap, although the timeline of their introduction is thrown off, until Hook shows up to say that another woman (Emma) has his ring. Charming looks at Snow's fairy dust pendant while she tells him her backstory (another timeline that was thrown off), and comes up with a plan to break into Regina's castle first, then rescue Emma and steal back the ring. Snow tells them to wait, which gives Hook and Charming time to talk about love. Moments later, Red Riding Hood shows up, revealing herself as a friend of Snow's, and who can get them into the castle. As they reach the place, Red, who transformed into a wolf, alarming a guard before Charming knocked him out, but the escape plan goes awry when they run into Emma and her fellow inmate, prompting Hook to tell Emma that she deprived him of a dashing rescue. In addition, Hook expressed annoyance seeing that Emma disrupted the timeline again by altering the woman's fate. Seconds later, Snow and Regina prepare to face off, with Snow throwing her dark fairy dust, but Regina uses her magic to stop it in midair. Snow tries telling her that what happened to Daniel (when she told Cora) was a mistake, saying that she was only a child, but an unforgiving Regina talks about consequences and sets up a stake to burn her. Regina throws a fireball at the helpless Snow White, who appears to die. Her death causes Red to howl as a wolf and Emma to cry over her mother's death.

Hook tries to comfort Emma by telling her that when his brother died all he could do was live in the moment. But Emma wonders how she still exists if Snow died. All of a sudden, a ladybug buzzes around Hook and just as he is about to kill the insect, Charming shouts “wait!” Charming takes the ladybug, places it on his hand and it is transformed back into Snow White by the Blue Fairy, thanks to a special form of fairy dust. The Blue Fairy is also aware that Emma wasn't Leia all along, but says it's all right, her secrets can be hers. Snow is startled when Emma hugs her with tears in her eyes, shouting, “You’re alive.” Snow and Charming seem to be warming up to each other, causing a slight restoration in the timeline. Emma looks at the prisoner and suggests that she and Hook take her with them back to Storybrooke, but the woman is not happy about that idea, prompting Emma to knock her out to kidnap her. As Emma, Hook, and their additional guest go their separate ways, both Snow and Charming reach the troll bridge, but thanks to the altered timeline Snow doesn't have her dust as a weapon to defeat the trolls, so she goes towards them and bluffs. They drop their weapons and take off. The timeline is back on track as Charming is now smitten with Snow before they go their separate ways, with Snow holding on to the ring and trying it on. Emma watches from a distance and gets weepy. Hook says, “It’s ok, Swan. Not everyone gets a chance to watch their parents fall in love.” Emma opens the book, and discovers a picture of Snow and Charming getting married, and as expected Regina still seeking vengeance on Snow, resulting in the timeline being restored, only this time Regina turns the trolls into bugs with the dark magic and squashes them.

Emma, Hook and their guest return to see Rumplestiltskin in the hopes that he can open the time portal, but instead he tells them that only they can re-open it because only the people who came through the portal can re-open it, but they need to wield magic. Rumple gives Emma a wand and tells her to open the portal if she has magic, but she doesn't think she can. Rumple decides he'd rather forget everything he's learned so as not to alter his future, then he sends Emma and Hook to a dark vault where he keeps dangerous and unpredictable magic, where their Storybrooke outfits are restored. Hook says that Emma still has some magic in her and after seeing what happened to her parents and realizing everything Henry did to bring her to Storybrooke, she's ready to return home. Hook and Emma then notice the wand lights up with magic and open up the portal, allowing Hook and the woman to escape first. Before she can leave, Rumple holds on to Emma and demands to know what happened to Baelfire/Neal. Emma tells him what happened, then she begs him not to take away the fact he died a hero. Rumplestiltskin drinks the forgetting potion and lets go of Emma where she is pulled into the portal, which sends her, Hook, and the woman back to Storybrooke.

=== In Storybrooke ===
As Emma and Hook return to the present day, Emma admits that her home is in Storybrooke and that she has been treating her parents like acquaintances for too long since the moment she met them. Emma returns home and gives them a big hug and calls them mom and dad for the second time and officially. Mary Margaret and David learn from Henry’s book that Leia was in fact Emma, and they congratulate their daughter on now officially being one of them: A “fairytale princess”. They tell her also that they are naming their new son Neal, in honor of Emma's first love and Gold's son. That evening, Hook revealed to Emma that he traded the Jolly Roger for a magic bean so he could bring her back to Storybrooke. Realizing this is the ultimate expression of Hook's feelings, Emma gives him a passionate kiss. Also that night, Gold and Belle get married, watched over by Belle's father Moe French and ordained minister Archie Hopper.

The prisoner Emma rescued is revealed to be Maid Marian, (Note: As later revealed in "Heart of Gold", Rumplestiltskin's assassination attempt in "Kansas" failed to kill Zelena. Instead, her spirit accompanied Hook and Emma when they went back in time, where Zelena killed Maid Marian, after they had rescued her. Zelena then used the Six-Leaf Clover of Oz to impersonate Marian, with Emma and Hook taking Zelena back to Storybrooke unwittingly.) who runs to embrace Robin Hood and Roland. A distraught Regina notes that Emma has done exactly what her mother did: unintentionally ruin her chance for happiness by naively trying to make things better. Regina ominously warns Emma that Marian had better be the only thing she brought back. Back at the barn, a container from Rumplestiltskin's vault (which Hook accidentally disturbed) is revealed to have fallen through the portal. The lid pops off and releases a blue liquid, which coalesces into a woman with ice powers. (Note: Identified off-screen as Elsa) She removes her gloves and unleashes an icy blast that destroys her former prison, before heading out of the barn, leaving a trail of frozen ground behind her.

== Cultural references ==
- The episode title is a spoken phrase by Dorothy Gale in the 1939 film, The Wizard of Oz.
- Emma's alias in the Enchanted Forest is Princess Leia; a reference to one of the main protagonists of the original Star Wars trilogy. This may be a reference to Disney's purchase of Lucasfilm, the studio behind the franchise; Disney was also the parent company of ABC, the network that aired Once Upon a Time.
- Hook's alias in the Enchanted Forest is Prince Charles; a reference to the former Prince of Wales and currently the King of the United Kingdom. It is also a reference to the inspiration of the character created by J. M. Barrie, because the Hook of the original play wears the same clothes as Charles II.

It was hinted on March 10, 2014, that the producers may be looking ahead at incorporating characters from the films The Princess and the Frog (2009), Brave (2012), and Frozen (2013) in future episodes, possibly towards the end of the third season, if they get the green light from Disney. The episode's conclusion introduces Frozen's Elsa to the series and sets up a story arc based on that film in the fourth season. The utilization of characters from the other two films would come in seasons seven and five, respectively.

== Reception ==
=== Ratings ===
The episode, along with "Snow Drifts," pulled in respectable numbers, placing a 2.3/7 with 6.80 million viewers tuning in (as they were combined as a two-hour episode), winning in both the 8 pm and 9 pm timeslots. This marks an increase in the 18-49 demographic from the previous episode, but a decrease in overall viewership. It also matches the 18-49 rating of the second-season finale; however, it also marked a decrease in overall viewers, as the second-season finale was watched by 7.33 million viewers. The show placed first not only in its timeslot and for the night of broadcast, but it also placed eleventh for the week.

2.59 million viewers watched the episode via DVR, bringing the total to 9.39 million viewers, and bringing the total 18-49 rating to 3.5.

In Canada, the episode was watched through CTV by 1.489 million viewers, placing third for the night and twenty-second for the week.

=== Critical reception ===
The season finale was met with positive reviews from critics.

Hillary Busis of Entertainment Weekly gave it a great review, saying "I mean. How am I supposed to discuss Once's two-hour finale -- an epic, fantastical take on Back to the Future complete with far-off places, daring sword fights, magic spells, and a princess in disguise -- when all I can talk about, all I can think about, is that final shot, which may just be the most surprising moment in the history of OUAT?"

Gwen Ihnat — writing for The A.V. Club — gave the finale an A− grade, saying "This finale shows the best of OUAT: Rumple conjuring magic, Red turning into a wolf, and a lovely blend of magic and fairy tales mixed with real-life concepts like family and home. When Emma sees her mother torched by a fireball (something that would only happen in a place like the Enchanted Forest), she realizes for the first time what she’d be giving up by moving to New York. It’s a crazy family, to be sure, but it’s hers, and the finale ends with Emma, who still thought of herself as an orphan as recently as Neverland, finally finding a home."

Christine Orlado of TV Fanatic gave the episode 4.7 out of 5 stars, while Amy Ratcliffe of IGN gave it an 8.9 out of 10, saying that "Once's season finale took a spirited trip into the past and introduced an exciting new villain" and gave Jennifer Morrison high marks for this latest outing.

=== Awards and nominations ===
| Year | Presenter | Award | Result |
|---|---|---|---|
| 2014 | Entertainment Weekly; Season Finale Awards | Best Romantic Cliffhanger | Won |
| 2014 | Entertainment Weekly; Season Finale Awards | Funniest Moment in a Drama | Won |
| 2014 | Entertainment Weekly; Season Finale Awards | Dumbest Move By a Character Who Should Be Smarter | Won |
| 2014 | Entertainment Weekly; Season Finale Awards | Weakest/Most Divisive Twist | Nominated |
| 2014 | Entertainment Weekly; Season Finale Awards | Cheesiest Effect | Won |
| 2014 | Entertainment Weekly; Season Finale Awards | Next Year's Season Pass is Now in Jeopardy | Nominated |
| 2014 | Entertainment Weekly; Season Finale Awards | Biggest Regret That I Didn't See It, I Just Heard or Read About It | Won |
