= Where Bluebirds Fly =

- Once Upon a Time episode
- Episode no.: Season 6 Episode 18
- Directed by: Michael Schulz
- Written by: David H. Goodman & Brigitte Hales
- Production code: 618
- Original air date: April 23, 2017

Guest appearances
- Giles Matthey as Morpheus/Gideon; Jaime Murray as Black Fairy; Isabella Blake-Thomas as Young Zelena; Keegan Connor Tracy as Mother Superior; Alex Désert as Stanum/Tin Man

Episode chronology
← Previous "Awake"	Next → "The Black Fairy"
- Once Upon a Time season 6

"Where Bluebirds Fly" is the eighteenth episode of the sixth season of the American fantasy drama series Once Upon a Time, which aired on April 23, 2017. In this episode, Zelena is tempted with an offer by the Black Fairy that could put her in a dangerous situation that prompts Regina to be drawn into the chaos, while Emma and Hook's wedding plans are made more chaotic by Snow and David. Meanwhile, Zelena's past with a cursed woodcutter, her quest to find him a heart, and her consequences afterwards, are revealed.

== Plot ==
=== Opening sequence ===
The Emerald City of Oz is seen in the forest.

=== Event Chronology ===
The Storybrooke events take place after "Awake" while the events in the Land of Oz occurs during the flashbacks that took place between "Sisters" and "It's Not Easy Being Green" and later on in the recent timeline between "Heart of Gold" and "Our Decay."

=== In The Characters' Past ===
In Oz, a young Zelena is testing out her magic on a bird's nest by restoring it back on top of a tree after a group of kids knocked it off. When a young boy named Stanum sees Zelena, he tells her that he likes her, regardless of whatever the children say about Zelena, who they see as a freak. Flash forward years later, where a now adult Zelena (now the Wicked Witch at this point) receives a surprise visit from an adult Stanum, this time requesting her help. He explains that Wicked Witch of the North cursed him and he is slowly turning into a tin man. Stanum is seeking out the Crimson Heart, which could restore him to human form, but moments after Zelena turn him down, Stanum accuses her of being afraid, prompting Zelena to change her mind.

During their quest, Stanum tells Zelena that she doesn't have to be lonely but she is doing her best to deny his advice. Suddenly, a lion comes out of nowhere to attack Stanum, and Zelena uses her magic to make the lion go away (at this point the lion has become as Zelena would put it, cowardly). When they finally arrived to the location of the Crimson Heart, the two learned that the only way to make it work is through the absorption of another person's magic. Unfortunately, Zelena's actions and selfish greed for magic causes her to betray Stanum, whom she suspects is aligned with Dorothy (at this point has not returned to Oz yet). By keeping the Heart for herself, leaving Stanum to transform into the Tin Man permanently.

=== In Storybrooke ===
At Zelena's farmhouse, Zelena is ready to give Robin her bottled milk, when she is surprised by the Black Fairy, who is holding her child. She offers Zelena a chance to join her in the final battle against Emma, but Zelena is furious with her unwanted visitor and asks her to leave after she turns down the offer, knowing that this was far from over. At the same time, Emma and Hook's planned morning is interrupted; Snow is ready and excited to help plan Emma and Hook's upcoming wedding, which is followed by Regina asking them if they'd seen Zelena. Hook then gives the wand piece he brought back from Neverland to Regina for her to examine. Snow encourages David, Emma, Hook and Henry to go looking for wedding venues to take their mind off the Black Fairy.

At the Pawn Shop, Gold tells Belle about how Mother Superior, when she was the Blue Fairy, knew about how his mother turned to Darkness, but since he had to put Mother Superior into a coma in order to protect Gideon, Gold decided to research more on what his mother is planning. When Zelena stops by the shop, she asks Belle to watch Robin while she goes after the Black Fairy. Moments later, after she studied the fragments, Regina shows up at the shop and realizes that Zelena has gone, leading her to the mines, since she finds her sister there and is hunting down the Black Fairy. This leads to a fight between the sisters with Zelena escaping the scuffle just in time to find the Black Fairy and Gideon, who then holds back Regina while the Black Fairy shows Zelena how powerless she can be, admitting that she was using her in order for Zelena to make the wrong decision. The Black Fairy absorbs Zelena's unstable dark magic to create the crystals needed for the final battle, then she sends them back to the outside of the mines. This causes more tensions as Regina tells Zelena that she should go back to Oz.

Around the same time, David notices the loft opened and finds Henry still trying to write the final chapter but discovered he can't do anything to change the outcome. Snow is looking at a series of venues, including Granny's and the Town Hall, to hold the wedding, but David isn't happy with his wife's ideas. Snow pulls him aside to voice her anger over this, but David says that the timing isn't right as long as the Black Fairy is in Storybrooke. Snow argues that they might not be around to give Emma a peaceful wedding. Emma however, takes her father's side and tells her parents that she's willing to wait until after the Final Battle for the right time.

Back at the farmhouse, Zelena prepares to return to Oz with Robin before changing her mind, instead creating a tornado to retrieve the Crimson Heart. She meets up with Regina, Emma, Snow, David, Hook, and Henry, and reveals that she still has the Crimson Heart, which she later uses to destroy all of her magic and render the crystals useless. After Zelena reveals what Gold did to Mother Superior, she along with Emma and Regina go to the Pawn Shop, where they convince Gold and Belle to allow Emma to use a crystal to free Mother Superior from her coma. At the same time, the Black Fairy sees this on her crystal ball and finally tells Gideon the truth about her real reason behind why she fears the Blue Fairy, and it is tied to her secret behind why she abandoned Rumpelstiltskin when he was an infant.

== Production Notes ==
Beverly Elliott was credited in this episode but did not appear. Sara Tomko was also set to appear but did not.

== Reception ==
=== Reviews ===
- Christine Laskodi of TV Fantic gave the episode a good review: 4.3 out of 5.0
- Entertainment Weekly gave the episode a C+
