= Awake (Once Upon a Time) =

- Once Upon a Time episode
- Episode no.: Season 6 Episode 17
- Directed by: Sharat Raju
- Written by: Andrew Chambliss & Leah Fong
- Production code: 617
- Original air date: April 16, 2017

Guest appearances
- Tony Amendola as Marco; Lee Arenberg as Grumpy/Leroy; Beverly Elliot as Granny; Giles Matthey as Morpheus/Gideon; Jaime Murray as Black Fairy; Raphael Sbarge as Archie Hopper; Sara Tomko as Tiger Lily; Mckenna Grace as young Emma

Episode chronology
← Previous "Mother's Little Helper"	Next → "Where Bluebirds Fly"
- Once Upon a Time season 6

"Awake" is the seventeenth episode of the sixth season of the American fantasy drama series Once Upon a Time, which aired on April 16, 2017. In this episode, Regina attempts to reverse the sleeping curse that Snow and David are under, while Hook encounters Tiger Lily as he finds a way to reach Emma and escape Neverland, and The Black Fairy comes face to face with Gold. In Storybrooke's past, a key element altered a timeline involving Snow and David during the first curse.

== Plot ==
=== Opening sequence ===
The portal door that Snow and David create to find Emma, and later use to rescue Hook, is seen in the forest.

=== Event chronology ===
The Storybrooke and Neverland events during the present day take place after "Mother's Little Helper" while the flashbacks take place a decade after "Welcome to Storybrooke", nine years before "Save Henry" and during Emma's childhood after the flashbacks in "The Dark Swan" and some years before "Snow Drifts".

=== In the characters' past ===
During the time of the first Dark Curse in Storybrooke, Mary Margaret visits David (still listed as John Doe and in a coma) and brought him a pixie flower. Upon touching it, David is brought out of his coma and remembers who he and Mary Margaret are. As Snow distracts Regina, David visits Gold, who he still knows as Rumplestiltskin, about the curse. He informs Gold that Emma (which he soon remembered, like he would later on in the pilot) has not arrived yet. Gold does not know where she is at this point but tells David that the flower has the ability to unite anyone with true love, including Snow and David with Emma. Unfortunately, Regina soon catches on to what Snow did after she brought David back to life.

Gold then later tells David and Snow that Emma is still a child and if they go to her they'll be a family again, but by doing so Emma's quest to become The Savior will never happen. Gold then proposes they drink a forgetting potion that would erase all of their past memories, until Emma arrives. When they go to the forest, David and Snow use the flower dust that creates a door that opens to see a young Emma (who was in a group home in 1993 Minnesota). Despite David's desire to go after Emma, Snow believes that Emma must follow her destiny as The Savior in order to save everyone trapped in the Land Without Magic. They shut back the door, kiss one more time, and drink the serum, returning to their cursed identities (with David also going back into the coma).

=== In Neverland ===
As Hook is being chased by the Lost Boys (who hold him responsible for Peter Pan's death), he finds himself surrounded at every turn (since the entire island can have everyone follow or be followed). Suddenly, a series of darts knock out the Lost Boys, and Hooks looks up to see Tiger Lily. But moments after he thanks her, she knocks Hook out with a tranquilizer as well. When he comes to, Hook is held captive by Tiger Lily. Hook pleads with Tiger Lily that he wants to return to Storybrooke and Emma, but when Tiger Lily tells Hook that she wants to deliver a driftwood-like weapon which is a fragment of the most powerful fairy wand in existence (which the Blue Fairy had used long ago to banish the Black Fairy to another realm), to help the Savior, he realizes that Tiger Lily is ready to help him. When they come across Peter Pan's former campsite, the two wait for the Lost Boys to fall asleep in order to obtain the magic required to get Hook back to Storybrooke. Tiger Lily also admits to Hook that she was a former fairy who was once close to the Black Fairy, before her turn to Darkness; she later gave up her wings and her wand out of shame, when the Black Fairy fell to Darkness. This was also how she came to acquire the weapon that Emma will need.

When they spot a tree whose sap can produce an ability to cross realms, Tiger Lily distracts the Boys while Hook runs to the tree and successfully acquired the sap, and conjures up his shadow. The shadow tries to take off with Hook but the Boys hold Hook down. However, Hook gives the wand fragment to his shadow instead, and it races off to find Emma. The shadow does reach Emma, who then uses the pixie flower potion to open up a portal, rescuing Hook from the Lost Boys and returning to Storybrooke; Tiger Lily escapes into the woods during the diversion.

=== In Storybrooke ===
As a concerned David fears for Emma's future (her hand continues to be shaky, and even Henry is worried), he comes to the conclusion that it's time to end the split sleeping Curse he and Snow has been under to support their daughter in her final battle. The Charmings plead with Regina to use the potion she has been testing out. Later on, Snow watches Regina and Zelena concoct the potion from a cauldron. Regina and Zelena then take their split hearts, dip them in the cauldron so the Curse can disappear, and place it back in their chests, but it turns out that The Evil Queen had it fail-safe, making it impossible for Regina to undo, causing Snow and David to both face the possibility that they will fall asleep under the Curse permanently by the end of that day. Hours later, as David reads a message from Snow, he notices the pixie flower from their past on the screen. Although he believes it can help them break the Curse, Zelena comments that the flowers bloom when great evil is present.

As expected, the Black Fairy has arrived to pay Gold, and his wife Belle, a visit at the Pawn Shop. When she says that Gideon won't be leaving her (also implying that he had no choice in helping her), Gold challenges her and takes out a potion, but before he can use it on her, the Black Fairy teleports the Dark One's Dagger into her hand and commands him to stop. She mocks him, telling him that his efforts are futile since she practically invented Dark Magic (this implies that she is over 563 years old, since Nimue became the first Dark One more than 533 years earlier). She returns the Dagger to Gold, saying that she won't force him to join her, but that he will do so willingly. In response, Gold tells her he would never join her, but she tells him that he will change his mind when he sees the Darkness she will bring, and that then, they could be the family that they "were always meant to be". Then, the Black Fairy teleports herself away with Gideon.

Later, the Black Fairy learns of Emma and Snow finding a field full of pixie flowers, which grew due to the Black Fairy's arrival. The Black Fairy introduces herself to Emma, saying that they were "destined to clash since the dawn of time". Then she forces Gideon to destroy the flowers, in order to make Snow and Emma suffer, but Emma discovers that one remained. They are able to use the flower to make a potion that can end Snow and David's shared Sleeping Curse for good, only to be interrupted by Hook's shadow. Sensing that Hook is in trouble, Snow tells Emma about her parents' attempt to find her during the first Curse, and now she wants Emma to use the flower to reunite her with Hook, telling Emma she will find another way to wake up Snow and David, before falling asleep. Emma immediately uses the potion to create a portal to Neverland, and brings Hook back to Storybrooke. As the two are finally reunited, Hook decides to propose to Emma the right way after admitting that he truly loved her and vowed to be honest with her. Hook gets down on one knee and asks Emma to marry him, and she accepts for real this time.

Later on in the Present, Regina, after having come up with a suggestion to reverse the Sleeping Curse, speaks to some of the residents with Snow and David sleeping alongside each other, as she told them about why they sacrificed themselves by allowing Emma to start her destiny to save everyone. Regina tells them that if they all take on the Sleeping Curse at the same time, it might become dilute enough to be easily broken. The residents each decide to drink a small portion of the sleeping curse from a chalice. After they drink it, Snow and David wake up, while the residents fall asleep around them, but soon afterwards, Snow and David see the residents wake again, due to the Sleeping Curse becoming weakened. Hook apologizes to David about killing his father, Robert, but is forgiven. Snow tells Emma that she won't face the Final Battle alone.

That evening at a street corner, Gold confronts the Black Fairy, but she insists that he will join her. However, Gold asks her if the reason why she wants him to join her was because Gideon didn't join her willingly. Gold tells her that he knows she has Gideon's heart, and that she had been manipulating Gideon against his will the whole time. When the Black Fairy asks him how he had figured this out, Gold tells the Black Fairy that Gideon was responsible for leaving the one flower behind for Emma and Snow, as he realizes that Gideon is a true believer, because he knows that Belle is his true mother, and that his love for his mother allowed him to resist the Black Fairy's command to a degree. This shocks the Black Fairy, who insists that such a thing is impossible. Gold tells the Black Fairy that he will get Gideon's heart back, no matter what it takes, but in response, the Black Fairy tells her son that if he decides to fight her head-on, Storybrooke could end up entirely destroyed. Gold tells her that this is a price he is willing to pay.

== Cultural references ==
Princess Tiger Lily used to be a fairy in Grimm Fairy Tales: Neverland

Pixie Flower with pixie dust allows for one to reunite with one's true love, opening a portal door to them.

== Production notes ==
This episode marked the first time since "I'll Be Your Mirror" that the entire cast was featured. Recurring regulars Mig Macario, Michael Coleman, and Jeffrey Kaiser only appeared in archival footage. Eric Keenleyside was listed as a guest star in this episode but never appeared.

== Reception ==
=== Reviews ===
- Christine Laskodi of TV Fantic gave the episode a positive review: 4.7 out of 5.0
- Entertainment Weekly gave the episode a B+.
