= Kansas (Once Upon a Time) =

- Once Upon a Time episode
- Episode no.: Season 3 Episode 20
- Directed by: Gwyneth Horder-Payton
- Written by: Andrew Chambliss & Kalinda Vazquez
- Production code: 320
- Original air date: May 4, 2014
- Running time: 44 minutes

Guest appearances
- Rebecca Mader as Zelena/Wicked Witch of the West; Sean Maguire as Robin Hood; Sunny Mabrey as Glinda/Good Witch of the South; David Anders as Dr. Whale; Raphael Sbarge as Jiminy Cricket/Dr. Archie Hopper; Matreya Scarrwener as Dorothy Gale; Christopher Gorham as Walsh (voice); Sharon Taylor as Witch of the East/Evanora; Karen Holness as Witch of the North/Locasta; Gabe Khouth as Mr. Clark; Jason Burkart as Little John

Episode chronology
← Previous "A Curious Thing"	Next → "Snow Drifts"
- Once Upon a Time (season 3)

"Kansas" is the twentieth episode of the third season of the American fantasy drama series Once Upon a Time, and the show's 64th episode overall, which aired on May 4, 2014. The episode was written by Andrew Chambliss & Kalinda Vazquez and directed by Gwyneth Horder-Payton.

In this episode Zelena kidnaps Snow White's baby, while flashbacks show Zelena's past with Glinda the Good Witch of the South.

== Title card ==
The skyline of the Emerald City of Oz stands beyond the Enchanted Forest.

== Plot ==
=== In the Characters' Past ===
In the Emerald City of Oz, Zelena watches Rumplestiltskin train Regina through the portal, as she plots her scheme to destroy her half-sister. Glinda then arrives to tell Zelena about her true destiny, and wants her to meet her real sisters, who then offer her a chance to become the Witch of the West after she is introduced. Glinda tells them that Zelena doesn't have to be wicked, but believes that she can be good, if she can put aside her vengeance against Regina. However, the sisters tell Zelena of a book that Glinda keeps that foretells the arrival of a person to Oz in a cyclone, and Zelena is led to believing that she was the one they were looking for. Glinda, on behalf of her sisters, then gives Zelena the light pendant that will harness and protect her as it grows her powers, but tells her that once it is removed she will be powerless. After she takes the pendant her green skin disappears. Moments later after Glinda shows her the land she is giving to Zelena, both Glinda and Zelena witness a green cyclone arriving and it reveals debris being left behind and along with it, a young girl from the outside world, who Zelena finds among the rubble. She tells them that her name is Dorothy Gale and when they ask her where she is from, Dorothy tells them she is from Kansas but wants to know where she is and their names. When Glinda suggests that they take Dorothy to meet the sisters, Zelena's jealousy starts to reemerge.

It appears that Dorothy has won over the other witches, except for Zelena, who now has become more envious of this latest visitor to their world (as evidenced by her green skin returning), and as she watches from the well, Glinda comes over to talk to her. However, Zelena, having read the book of prophecies, believes that Dorothy will replace her, saying that she is the greatest evil and a threat to Oz. Later on, Zelena surprises Dorothy at the well, where Zelena's green skin returns, making her evil as ever and vows to threaten Dorothy by creating a fireball that she will aim at her. This prompts a confused Dorothy to take a bucket of water from the well and throw it at her, causing Zelena to melt. Dorothy then runs and tells Glinda what had happened, but Glinda tells her that what she did to Zelena was the right thing to do; it turns out that Zelena was the evil threat all along. Glinda then offers Dorothy a chance to join the council of witches, but Dorothy turns her down and says she's sorry and wants to go home. Glinda tells her that the Wizard (who she believes has returned to his normal form) will return her to Kansas.

When they arrive to the Wizard's palace, Glinda and Dorothy arrive to see the unseen Wizard, who then grants Dorothy her wish by giving her a pair of silver slippers to use to return to her world. However, after Dorothy disappears, Glinda discovers that the person that was behind the curtain was none other than Zelena, who was pretending to be the Wizard and survived the "melting" by reappearing after the incident. Now that she knows about her being the true threat and revealing her as the greatest evil, Zelena banishes Glinda to a pocket dimension within the northern region of the Enchanted Forest, where she can never tell the others. After she disappears, Zelena's pendant turns green, indicating Zelena's new power.

=== In Storybrooke ===
As David Nolan, Mary Margaret, Emma Swan, and Henry Mills arrive at the hospital for the delivery of the baby, Dr. Whale is there and ready to prep. Emma and Regina then put a protection spell around the hospital to keep Zelena away. Hook arrives to explain to Emma about why Zelena cursed him but when David interrupts the two by suggesting that Hook and Emma should go together to defeat Zelena, Emma is reluctant to have Hook tag along. At the same time, Gold, who is being watched by Zelena, is using his spinning wheel in his cage to create a pile of golden strands. Zelena then uses the strands to transform it into a golden brain that she'll use in her plans to create her time-travelling spell. They then put the items (Regina's heart, David's broken sword and the brain) in a circle. As Emma and Hook arrive to the farm to stop Zelena, she tells him that once this is over she and Henry are leaving Storybrooke but Hook thinks she is making a mistake, saying she is afraid. As Zelena and Gold approach the intruders, Zelena makes Emma choose between Hook and her magic, using her power to force Hook into an open water tank and make him drown. Emma then rescues Hook from the water and revives him with mouth-to-mouth. When their lips touch, a wave of magic is released from Emma and with it Hook's curse. Hook is stunned that Emma would make a sacrifice of giving up her magic to save him, asking her, "What did you do?"

At the hospital, Mary Margaret finally gives birth to a baby boy, which comes just in time for Zelena and Gold to arrive and take the baby. Zelena wastes no time at all, taking out anyone that stands in her way, including knocking out Belle, which greatly upsets Gold. Zelena also knocks out Regina, after she tells Henry and Archie to hide, since Emma's protection spell faded, after she sacrificed her magic to save Hook. Zelena then freezes Mary Margaret and David and disappears with the newborn. Emma and Hook then arrive back to the hospital to explain what had happened to David. Emma soon discovers that Regina has the power of light magic to defeat her half-sister, and even Henry now believes that Regina can save the baby, since her kiss helped to break the curse, and because she still has some good in her. Back at the farm, Zelena places the baby at the edge of the circle and starts her spell, only to be interrupted by Emma, David, Hook, Robin Hood, and Regina, resulting in a battle. Zelena, believing that she has an advantage, tells Regina that only light magic can defeat her, but Regina's magic is as dark as they come. Regina, however, tells Zelena that she's wrong. Out of nowhere, Regina conjures up a source of light magic that knocks Zelena away from the dagger, allowing Regina to take away Zelena's pendant, rendering Zelena powerless. The loss of Zelena's powers results in her flying monkeys returning to human form, including Little John (who is nearly beheaded by David). Gold then tries to take Zelena with him because of everything she did to him, but Regina takes his dagger and prevents him from enacting revenge. Later on at the jail, Regina tries to reason with Zelena in an effort to redeem herself by saying that evil isn't born, it's made and so is being good, and leaves her with an offer to change her ways. Regina then takes the green pendant and places it in the vault. Over at the hospital, David returns the baby back to Mary Margaret's arms, but Emma tells Hook after he thanked her that her powers did not return after Zelena's powers were removed, saying she was glad they were removed so she can return to New York City with Henry. Emma then brought Henry over to watch David and Mary Margaret embrace the new baby with Hook watching on, disappointed over Emma's choice to leave Storybrooke.

Around the same time, Gold returns to the pawn shop and is embraced by Belle, who knew that he would return to her because of faith. Belle then gives Gold back his dagger because she believes in him, but on the condition that he promises not to use it to kill Zelena. As Gold takes the dagger, he gives it back to her because he loves her too much to make a risk. Gold then asks Belle to marry him, and she says yes. Unfortunately, it is later revealed that Gold still has not gotten over his vengeance against Zelena because it turns out that the dagger he gave Belle was a fake. Mr. Gold heads to Zelena's jail cell and tells her of his intent to kill her, despite her protests that she is now powerless. Gold then takes the dagger and kills her, which turns Zelena into a clay statue of herself that suddenly shatters into pieces. However, her clay fragments vaporize into a green cloud and vanish, and Zelena's pendant in the vault releases her remaining magic and essence as a green cloud of smoke, (Note: As later revealed in "Heart of Gold", Rumplestiltskin's assassination attempt failed to kill Zelena.) which escapes back to the barn, and is used to re-open the time portal.

== Cultural references ==
- This episode is a rendition of The Wonderful Wizard of Oz story, focusing on Dorothy's relationship with the Wicked Witch of the West. Also included are the Good Witch of the South, Witch of the North, Witch of the East, the Wizard and the Flying Monkeys from the same story.
- When Zelena is carrying the Snow White and Prince Charming's baby to her house, she hums the lullaby, "Hush, Little Baby".
- Alchemical signs for the four elements are carved into the witches' table and the stone pillars. Each element represent one of the four witches:
  - Air (upward-pointing triangle, bisected by a horizontal line): the Witch of the North
  - Earth (downward-pointing triangle, bisected by a horizontal line): the Witch of the East
  - Fire (upward-pointing triangle): the Witch of the South
  - Water (downward-pointing triangle): Fittingly enough, the Witch of the West, and the seat that Dorothy Gale was offered.
- The inscriptions on the pillars behind the witches contain letters from the Theban alphabet, which is also known as the Witches' Alphabet. There are four sections, each with two pillars. The text translates as:
  - Defender of the Northern lands (upward-pointing triangle, bisected by a horizontal line)
  - Protector of the Eastern realm (downward-pointing triangle, bisected by a horizontal line)
  - Guardian of the Southern lands (upward-pointing triangle)
  - Keeper of the Western realm (downward-pointing triangle)

== Reception ==
=== Ratings ===
Although it won its timeslot for the fourth week in a row, the episode placed a 2.1/6 among 18- to 49-year-old adults, with only 6.86 million viewers tuning in, a one-point drop from the previous outing.

=== Critical reception ===
The episode was met with mixed to positive reviews.

Hillary Busis of Entertainment Weekly gave it a great review: "Around 8:55 p.m. tonight, it seemed that every conflict at the center of season 3B had finally been resolved. Zelena was roundly defeated -- not by a bucket of water, but by The Force/Old Magic/The Power of Love. Regina had completed her journey from villain to anti-hero to full-blown heroine, gaining a strapping new soulmate in the process. Rumple had regained control of his dagger and formally proposed to Belle. (He's a powerful, enigmatic, once-married longtime bachelor finally re-committing after a lengthy stretch of solitude; just think of Rump as the Enchanted Forest's answer to George Clooney.) And to top it all off, Snow and Charming's royal bundle of joy had finally been born, kidnapped, and returned to his loving parents -- all before the couple even had a chance to give the baby a name. (Who wants to bet they'll go with "Baelfire"?) And that, of course, is when Rumple threw a wrench into the works of this particular happy ending. Actually, make that a dagger."

Christine Orlado of TV Fanatic gave the episode 4.6 out of 5 stars.

Amy Ratcliffe of IGN gave it an 8.3, saying that "This week's Once took an underwhelming detour to Oz but delivered with some intense action."

Gwen Ihnat of The A.V. Club gave the episode a C, also criticising the flashback story, and also how easily Zelena was defeated; saying that "Unfortunately, this fate/destiny exploration lands in an episode that is maddening even by OUAT standards. It may rank the highest this season for SMH (Shake My Head) moments, which is really saying something."
