= Galileo (musical) =

2024 musical

- A New Musical
- Music: Zoe Sarnak; Michael Weiner
- Lyrics: Zoe Sarnak; Michael Weiner
- Book: Danny Strong
- Basis: Life of Galileo Galilei
- Premiere: May 15, 2024: Berkeley Repertory Theatre

Galileo (stylized in all caps) is a biographical rock opera about the life and times of astronomer and scientist Galileo Galilei and his defense of his findings against the Catholic Church, known as the Galileo affair. The book was written by Danny Strong, and the music, lyrics, and arrangement were written by Zoe Sarnak and Michael Weiner.

The show premiered at Berkeley Repertory Theatre in 2024, and is set to transfer to Broadway at the Shubert Theatre in December 2026.

== Plot ==
When scientist Galileo Galilei makes discoveries about the universe, he must defend his work against the church.

== Production history ==
In June 2019, Raúl Esparza led a single-performance workshop reading at the Susan Stein Shiva Theatre at Vassar College in Poughkeepsie, New York. Galileo made its world premiere at Berkeley Rep in May 2024. It has a book by Danny Strong, music and lyrics by Michael Weiner and Zoe Sarnak, and is directed by Michael Mayer with choreography by David Neumann. The production won six 2025 San Francisco Bay Area Theatre Critics Circle Awards, including Best Production, from 16 nominations.

Variety's review was headlined, "Grafting ’80s-Style Power Ballads onto the Story of a Renaissance Visionary Yields Assertive but Awkward Results."

Galileo is set to begin previews at Broadway's Shubert Theatre on November 10, 2026, with a December 6 opening night.

== Characters and cast ==
Character	Berkeley Rep	Broadway
Character	2024	2026
Galileo Galilei	Raúl Esparza	Raúl Esparza
Bishop Maffeo Barberini	Jeremy Kushnier	Jeremy Kushnier
Virginia Galilei	Madalynn Mathews	Joy Woods
Cardinal Morosini	Javier Muñoz	Javier Muñoz
Bishop Grasso	Bradley Dean	Bradley Dean
Alessandro Tarantola	Christian Magby	Jordon Lee Garcia
Giordano Bruno	Adam Halpin	Adam Halpin
Galileo Alternate	Bradley Dean	Michael Park

== Songs ==
=== Berkeley Rep, 2024 ===
Act One

- The Center of the Universe - Orchestra
- One True Faith - Galileo, Morosini, Grasso, and Company
- Believe The Day Is Coming - Galileo and Barberini
- Remapping My Sky - Virginia
- Remapping My Sky (Reprise) - Virginia
- He Gave Us Stars - Galileo, Virginia, and Ensemble
- Louder, Louder - Virginia and Alessandro
- Heaven's Changing - Galileo
- Whispers - Virginia, Alessandro, and Ensemble
- By Your Light - Barberini
- One True Faith (Reprise) - Morosini, Grasso, and Bishops
- Only Just Begun - Galileo and Ensemble
- Act 1 Finale - Company

Act Two

- The Power and the Glory - Barberini and Ensemble
- The Power and the Glory (Reprise) - Galileo
- In Your Devine - Virginia and Young Nun
- Believe The Day Is Coming (Reprise) - Galileo and Barberini
- Magnificat - Ensemble
- Always Asking Why - Virginia and Galileo
- A Dialogue (Two Sides) - Galileo, Salviati, Simplicio, and Virginia
- War Is - Alessandro, Morosini, Grasso, Barberini, and Ensemble
- The Man You Think I Am - Galileo and Barberini
- When Does The Truth Cost Too Much - Virginia
- Galileo's Last Prayer - Galileo
- The Power and the Glory (Reprise) - Barberini and Ensemble
- The Truth Will Follow Us - Virginia, Galileo, and Company

== Awards and nominations ==
=== 2024 Berkeley Rep production ===
Year	Award	Category	Work	Result	Ref.
2025	Bay Area Theatre Critics Circle Awards	Best Production		Won	
2025	Bay Area Theatre Critics Circle Awards	Best Principal Performance	Raúl Esparza	Won	
2025	Bay Area Theatre Critics Circle Awards	Best Principal Performance	Madalynn Mathews	Nominated	
2025	Bay Area Theatre Critics Circle Awards	Best Featured Performance	Jeremy Kushnier	Nominated	
2025	Bay Area Theatre Critics Circle Awards	Best Featured Performance	Bradley Dean	Nominated	
2025	Bay Area Theatre Critics Circle Awards	Best Stage Direction	Michael Mayer	Nominated	
2025	Bay Area Theatre Critics Circle Awards	Best Music Direction	Roberto Sinha	Nominated	
2025	Bay Area Theatre Critics Circle Awards	Best Original Music	Michael Weiner and Zoe Sarnak	Won	
2025	Bay Area Theatre Critics Circle Awards	Best Original Script	Danny Strong	Nominated	
2025	Bay Area Theatre Critics Circle Awards	Best Choreography	David Neumann	Nominated	
2025	Bay Area Theatre Critics Circle Awards	Best Specialties Design	Tom Watson	Nominated	
2025	Bay Area Theatre Critics Circle Awards	Best Projection Design	Jason H. Thompson and Kaitlyn Pietras	Nominated	
2025	Bay Area Theatre Critics Circle Awards	Best Sound Design	John Shivers	Won	
2025	Bay Area Theatre Critics Circle Awards	Best Set Design	Rachel Hauck	Nominated	
2025	Bay Area Theatre Critics Circle Awards	Best Lighting Design	Kevin Adams	Won	
2025	Bay Area Theatre Critics Circle Awards	Best Costume Design	Anita Yavich	Won	
