= The Dark Swan =

- Once Upon a Time episode
- Episode no.: Season 5 Episode 1
- Directed by: Ron Underwood
- Written by: Edward Kitsis and Adam Horowitz
- Production code: 501
- Original air date: September 27, 2015

Guest appearances
- Lee Arenberg as Grumpy / Leroy; Beverley Elliott as Granny / Widow Lucas; Liam Garrigan as King Arthur; Andrew Jenkins as Sir Percival; Elliot Knight as the Usher; Mckenna Grace as young Emma; Amy Manson as Merida; Keegan Connor Tracy as The Blue Fairy / Mother Superior; Sinqua Walls as Lancelot; Timothy Webber as The Apprentice

Episode chronology
← Previous "Operation Mongoose"	Next → "The Price"
- Once Upon a Time season 5

"The Dark Swan" is the first episode of the fifth season of the American fantasy drama series Once Upon a Time, which aired on September 27, 2015.

In this episode, the events of Emma Swan being consumed by the Darkness have left the residents of Storybrooke without "The Savior," leaving Regina, Mary Margaret, Hook, David, Henry, Robin, and Belle to find a way to save her, even if it means turning to an unlikely individual that they cannot trust. Meanwhile, Emma finds herself in the Enchanted Forest where she encounters Merida en route to Camelot in her search for Merlin before the darkness consumes her for good.

Commentators gave the episode positive reviews, citing the episode's dark and more human tone following the events of the fourth-season finale.

== Plot ==
=== Opening sequence ===
Granny's Diner is shown in the forest.

=== Event chronology ===
The Land Without Magic flashbacks take place in 1989, a few years after the events of "The Stranger" and a few years before "Snow Drifts". The Camelot flashbacks take place immediately before the scene where King Arthur shows Excalibur to his subjects in "The Broken Kingdom" and before Lancelot's banishment in the same episode. The Enchanted Forest events take place after "Fall" and before "The Broken Kingdom". The Storybrooke flashbacks take place after "Operation Mongoose" and the present Camelot events take place years after Lancelot's banishment, and before "The Price".

=== In the Characters' Past ===
==== In Minnesota ====
In a movie theater in 1989 Minneapolis, Minnesota, a young Emma is watching The Sword in the Stone. She steals a woman's candy bar, and is approached by an usher, who tells Emma "Don't do it". She expects him to reprimand her, but he instead offers her advice by saying, "When you do something that you're not supposed to do, even if you're doing it for the right reason, bad things will happen". He also mentions that she will have the opportunity to remove Excalibur from its stone and warns her not to touch it, just before he disappears.

==== In Camelot ====
King Arthur and two of his knights, Sir Lancelot and Sir Percival, arrive to the location of the stone in which Excalibur is embedded. Sir Kay has found it first and as he tries to pull the sword out, he is turned to ash. Despite this, Arthur proceeds with his mission and manages to successfully pull the sword out, only to discover that the tip is missing. He vows to seek out the missing piece, which is revealed to be the blade of the Dark One's Dagger.

==== In Storybrooke ====
Continuing from the previous episode's events, everyone is left stunned after Emma absorbs the powers of the Dark One and vanishes, leaving behind only the Dagger with her name on it. While Regina is furious over what Emma has done, Mary Margaret still believes that Emma has good in her and that she can be saved. Hook takes the Dagger to summon her back, but to no avail; as Regina explains, Emma has gone to a different world. Later, they learn from the Apprentice that Emma is now in the Enchanted Forest, and he has a wand that was given to him by Merlin, which contains all of the light magic, which can help them find Emma, but it can only open a portal to another realm if it is wielded with "two sides of the coin", the light and the dark. The Apprentice dies and drops the wand; (Note: Later confirmed by Hook in "The Bear and the Bow".) Regina picks up the wand but cannot use it, as she no longer has darkness anymore (later revealed to be because she didn't believe that she can use it); they need someone "wicked".

Regina and Robin Hood go to the hospital ward to see Zelena. Zelena agrees to help if she could see the wand, but needs something meaningful to Emma so the spell will work. She also cannot use her magic unless Regina removes the cuff that is restricting Zelena's magic, so she asks her to remove it. Regina refuses. Later, at Granny's, Hook and Henry formulate a plan to release Zelena. However, their plan backfires, and Zelena breaks free from the cell, after cutting off her hand to remove the magic cuff, before reattaching her hand. Zelena takes Robin captive and trades him for the wand, which she intends to use to return to Oz. As Zelena opens a portal, which takes the form of a cyclone and substantially drains her powers, Regina takes advantage of Zelena's weakened state to put the cuff back on her wrist, as well as to redirect the portal to take them to the Enchanted Forest, using Emma's blanket to locate her. The cyclone immediately heads towards Granny's diner, and transports everyone in the establishment to the location of Emma's whereabouts.

==== In the Enchanted Forest and Camelot ====
Emma emerges in the Enchanted Forest through the Vault of the Dark One, and finds herself haunted by the voice of the darkness inside of her, which has manifested as a personification of Rumplestiltskin. She struggles to resist, and vows not to hurt her family. Then, Emma runs up to a peddler, but is angered into accidentally choking him. The Dark One tricks Emma into using a transportation spell, and she sees a will-o-the-wisp. The Dark One tells her that for the Wisp to answer her question, she will have to catch it. As she chases it, Emma comes upon a red-headed archer named Merida, who nabs the wisp and places it in her bag. Emma confronts Merida, accidentally using dark magic, and tries to convince her that she needs it to find Merlin. Merida is reluctant to trust Emma, but decides to go with her, keeping the wisp in her bag. Merida informs Emma that more wisps are born at the Hill of Stones, so they head in that direction.

Emma learns that Merida needs the wisp in order to restore her family's kingdom and save her triplet younger brothers who were kidnapped by the United Clans of her country after they refused to let her rule as queen. After they make camp for the night, the manifestation of Rumplestiltskin tries to guide Emma into betraying Merida once they reach the home of the wisps. The manifestation of Rumplestiltskin tells Emma that once Merida speaks into the Wisp, it will continue to do her bidding until she dies, and thus, the only solution would then be for Emma to kill her. Merida overhears the conversation, and sneaks off to the Hill of Stones by herself. Emma catches up with her in the morning and is goaded by Rumplestiltskin's manifestation, against her better judgment and good nature, to rip Merida's heart out. Before Emma can crush the heart, Hook appears with the others and talks her down from it, and she restores Merida's heart. Once everything has settled down, Merida thanks Emma (much to the latter's shock) for showing her that she has darkness in her, too; she was about to kill the clan leaders who kidnapped her brothers and the experience has convinced her to spare them. Mary Margaret hands Emma the dagger; however, Emma, believing that carrying the dagger would give her too much power and too much temptation to embrace the darkness, wants someone else to possess it. She decides to give the dagger to Regina, due to her previous dark deeds, which makes her the only one capable of killing Emma if necessary. Moments later, King Arthur and his knights arrive on horseback in order to proclaim that they have been awaiting Emma's arrival, per a prophecy by Merlin. Arthur believes that Emma will be able to reunite them with Merlin, and later leads everyone involved to Camelot.

=== In Storybrooke ===
Six weeks later after the group entered Camelot, they awaken in Granny's Diner, back in Storybrooke, where they find themselves wearing Arthurian attire. They also find that their memory ends with them entering Camelot. Emma later shows up in the diner, having embraced becoming the Dark One and vows revenge against the others for failing her.

== Production ==
This episode officially marked the additions of Rebecca Mader and Sean Maguire to the regular cast after recurring for the past two seasons.

== Culture references ==
This episode briefly references the 2008 series Merlin, stating they were two sides of a coin.

== Reception ==
=== Ratings ===
This episode posted its lowest numbers ever for a season premiere, placing a 1.8/5 among 18-49s with 5.93 million viewers tuning in, a 48 percent drop from the fourth-season premiere but slightly up from the fourth-season finale. The episode saw an increase of 2.44 million viewers, and a 1.1 increase in the 18-49 demographic with Live+7 DVR viewing included. Which gave the episode an overall audience of 8.37 million viewers, and a 2.9 18-49 rating.

=== Reviews ===
The episode was met with excellent reviews. Critics praised the much darker and human tone of the show, the script, and Emma's role, especially Jennifer Morrison's performance.

Andrea Towers of Entertainment Weekly said, "Much like the first season of the fairytale show, it looks like we'll spend most of 5A looking back at what actually happened in those missing six weeks, how Emma became the Dark One, and what it means for Storybrooke. It'll be interesting to see where this season lands overall. Last year, we spent months entombed in a Frozen arc that seemed to stretch on for so long, it made even the warmest of fans feel icy. Putting Emma in the spotlight as the Dark One seems like an attempt to bring some focus back to the show's themes as well as its central characters, despite the fact there are certainly going to be many new ones popping in (and out) over the season. And hey, if we learned anything from last season's Queens of Darkness, it's that maybe we'll at least get some awesome wardrobe changes for Emma. Some darker eyeliner? Strappy awesome three inch stilettos? The possibilities are endless… "

Amy Ratcliffe of IGN said of the episode, "Once Upon a Time got right to the main event in the Season 5 premiere: Emma's transformation into the Dark Swan. They could have dragged the will she/won't she aspect out for several episodes but going this route means a more interesting take on the story and seeing more of Morrison playing the villain. Morrison delivered some of her best work on the show to date, and it's terrific to see the plot focus on a member of the regular cast." Ratcliffe gave the episode an 8.4 rating out of 10.

In a review from Rickey.org, Nick Roman said, "“The Dark Swan” was a tremendous premiere for Once Upon a Time, because it played with the structure of the series to breathe new life into it. Instead of a flashback, we get a flash forward that future flashbacks will illuminate. We'll see how Emma comes to lose her goodness, and how her humanity might be reclaimed. If nothing else, we'll get to see evil Jennifer Morrison, which I'm more than stoked to witness, with what little we got of it tonight. In short, Once Upon a Time is back, and I couldn't be happier."

Gwen Ihnat of The A.V. Club gave the premiere a positive review, giving it a C+ grade for the entire setup, but the final moments received a A+. She said that the Camelot storyline "is a 4,000-percent improvement over last year's Frozen plot," and added that "if the show goes full-on Dark Emma, it will be hard to turn away."

Christine Orlando of TV Fanatic gave the episode a 4.4 out of 5 stars.

In a review from Blogcritics, Barbara Bennett praised the changes in the storyline and unique twists in this episode and the upcoming season: "I have to say, I really loved the way series creators Adam Horowitz and Eddy Kitsis have merged bits of Arthurian legend into the Once Upon a Time landscape. From The Sword in the Stone to the introduction of Arthur and Lancelot, I think this just might work–and be far more integrated into the series narrative than Frozen had been. And for that I cheer!"
