= The Song in Your Heart =

- Once Upon a Time episode
- Episode no.: Season 6 Episode 20
- Directed by: Ron Underwood
- Written by: David H. Goodman & Andrew Chambliss
- Production code: 620
- Original air date: May 7, 2017

Guest appearances
- Tony Amendola as Geppetto/Marco; Lee Arenberg as Grumpy/Leroy; Beverly Elliott as Granny; Giancarlo Esposito as Magic Mirror; Chris Gauthier as William Smee; Jaime Murray as Black Fairy/Fiona; Raphael Sbarge as Archie Hopper; Keegan Connor Tracy as Blue Fairy

Episode chronology
← Previous "The Black Fairy"	Next → "The Final Battle"
- Once Upon a Time season 6

"The Song in Your Heart" is the twentieth episode of the sixth season of the American fantasy drama series Once Upon a Time. It first aired on May 7, 2017. Billed as a musical episode, it marks a departure from the typical dramatic elements featured in the series. In this episode, Emma and Hook prepare for their wedding, but Fiona is preparing a plot that will begin the Final Battle. In flashbacks, Snow and David make a wish that results in the entire Enchanted Forest and Oz breaking out in song.

== Plot ==
=== Opening sequence ===
An orchestra is shown in the Forest, playing the theme song of the series.

=== Event chronology ===
The Storybrooke events take place after the current events of "The Black Fairy", and in 1991 after "Tougher Than the Rest"; the flashback events in the Enchanted Forest occur after the pilot episode and before "The Stranger"; and the events in Oz occur after "Chosen".

=== In the characters' pasts ===
==== Land Without Magic, 1991 ====
At a group children's home in Minnesota, Emma records herself singing, only to have another girl interrupt her, reminding Emma that she will always be an orphan.

==== The Enchanted Forest and Oz, before the first Curse ====
After talking with Rumplestiltskin in the castle dungeon, Snow makes a wish that her future daughter will be happy and safe before the Curse takes place. The next day, her wish comes true: Snow and David break into song and realize that they can defeat Regina through the power of music ("Powerful Magic"). The wish also affects Regina, who notices that the entire forest is singing ("The Queen Sings") and makes a plan to destroy everyone's happiness ("Love Doesn't Stand a Chance").

Meanwhile, David and Snow visit a tavern to enlist Hook to help them search for Regina. Hook refuses their offer of gold and explains that revenge on Rumplestiltskin is all that he desires ("Revenge Is Gonna Be Mine"). David and Snow offer to surrender Rumplestiltskin to Hook in exchange for passage on his ship to Regina's castle. Regina visits Rumplestiltskin, who is not affected by the wish, at his cell. Regina asks for his help in erasing the wish, but he refuses. In Oz, Zelena spies on their conversation and believes that Rumplestiltskin might come to regret choosing Regina over her. She prepares a spell for Regina to end the Singing Spell, which she will take credit for ("Wicked Always Wins").

Snow and David confront Regina, and the Singing Spell seems to make Regina's magic ineffective against the Charmings ("Charmings vs. Evil Queen"), but Regina uses a magic box she had found (which contains Zelena's spell) to stop them from singing and sends them back to their castle. Upon their return, the Blue Fairy appears to Snow and David and informs them that the power of song was never meant to be used to defeat the Evil Queen, instead placing it in Emma's heart, where the Power of Song will help her win a major battle one day. The Blue Fairy tells them that Emma won't be alone.

=== In Storybrooke ===
As the wedding approaches, Emma is unable to decide on a dress, so Snow brings over the dress she wore at her wedding, which she found at the Pawn Shop. But just moments before Emma tries on the gown, it immediately turns black; they are surprised to see Fiona appear, having thought that Gold had killed her. Fiona demands that Emma turn over her heart, then taunts Emma about believing herself to be orphan, saying that she is still "weak" and hasn't really "grown up," adding that "[she's] still just the lonely little girl [she] always [was]." Fiona lets the women know that she plans to use an enormous amount of Black Fairy Dust to unleash another Dark Curse on Storybrooke at 6:00 PM, the same time as Emma and Hook's wedding. When they check the clock tower at Fiona's suggestion, they discover that Fiona had brought enough Black Fairy Dust to curse Storybrooke more than ten times over.

This prompts Regina and Zelena to come up with a plan to stop Fiona from crashing the wedding, while Emma informs Hook of her decision to face the Black Fairy before the wedding, and says goodbye in case she dies. Hook confronts Gold at the Pawn Shop for lying to everyone about Fiona. When Gold refuses to apologize, saying that he did it for the good of his family, Hook uses Dreamshade on Gold to knock him out, hoping to buy time for Emma to defeat Fiona. Fiona appears, prompting Hook to flee. At the Sheriff's station, Emma gets a sign of encouragement from Henry, but when Henry finds the recording of her singing, Emma says that it's nothing.

Hours later, Zelena helps Regina remember how to isolate the part of the potion that stops time, which they hope can buy them more time to stop Fiona. Unfortunately, just as they are about to enact the spell, Gold uses it on Emma's family. Emma goes to confront Fiona at the Mayor's office, but Fiona holds Emma's family hostage, save for Henry, along with Regina, Zelena, and Hook. Fiona taunts Emma by playing her the song from her childhood, which reminds her of a time when she was alone. Henry, upset that Emma has decided to turn over her heart to Fiona, throws down his book in rage, only to discover a page in the book that reveals that Emma's heart was gifted with the magic of song, placed there by The Blue Fairy. When Emma meets with Fiona, she rips out her heart but is unable to crush it. Henry rushes in to stop his mother, telling her that she has a song in her heart, which suddenly emboldens Emma as her music starts to strengthen her ("Emma's Theme"). This causes Fiona to try to kill Emma with a blast of Dark Magic, but she fails. Emma then uses her magic to free everyone. As Henry returns Emma's heart to her, Fiona tells her that they will still face each other in the Final Battle.

The wedding commences on a rooftop overlooking Storybrooke. With Archie serving as their ordained minister, everyone watches as Emma and Hook exchange vows and wedding rings. The residents then celebrate with a dance and festivities ("A Happy Beginning"), until the Black Fairy's Curse erupts from the face of the clock tower at the stroke of 6:00 PM, with black tendrils streaming out and engulfing Storybrooke.

== Cultural references ==
Lyrics from "The Queen Sings", specifically ones sung by Grumpy and Geppetto, reference the Disney films Snow White and the Seven Dwarfs and Pinocchio.

Emma's wedding dress is inspired by Grace Kelly's wedding dress.

== Production ==
A musical episode was initially conceived during production of the third season, but according to showrunner Jane Espenson, it was too expensive at the time. The producers revisited the idea in July 2016 after receiving feedback and requests from viewers.

Paul Becker, who was hired as the choreographer for the episode, confirmed the episode on his Instagram account on February 9, 2017. Most of the cast did the recording first, with the choreography done afterwards, so the playback could blend in with the scenes. During the final day of shooting, Colin O'Donoghue injured his foot while performing his number.

Emma's wedding dress was inspired by Jennifer Morrison's fascination with Grace Kelly's wedding dress from 1956, which Morrison suggested to costume designer Eduardo Castro. In addition, both Morrison and O'Donoghue suggested that the wedding have a vintage feel, similar to black and white film musicals, while O'Donoghue had a say on the wedding ring. The suit he wore in the scene was a last-minute idea from Edward Kitsis, using a jacket created by Burberry. There were also discussions about the location of the wedding scene, but given weather conditions, they decided on a rooftop setting.

A special screening of the episode, followed by a question and answer session with executive producers and available cast, was held on May 2, 2017 at the Frank G. Wells Theater on the Walt Disney Studio Lot in Burbank, California.

=== Casting ===
Emilie de Ravin is credited but does not appear in this episode. Jakob Davies, who had previously played Pinocchio as a recurring guest star, had to relinquish the role in this episode to his younger brother Jack; the character is supposed to remain a boy as part of the continuity, and the producers wanted "to keep Pinocchio in the family".

=== Music ===
Once Upon a Time: The Musical Episode

Soundtrack album by various artists
- Released: May 5, 2017
- Genre: Soundtrack
- Length: 19:33
- Label: Walt Disney Records
- Producer: Alan Zachary; Michael Weiner

The episode features eight songs:

- "Powerful Magic" - Ginnifer Goodwin (Snow White) and Josh Dallas (Prince Charming)
- "The Queen Sings" - Lana Parrilla (Queen Regina), Giancarlo Esposito (Magic Mirror), Lee Arenberg (Grumpy), Tony Amendola (Geppetto), Beverley Elliott (Granny), Ginnifer Goodwin (Snow White), and Josh Dallas (Prince Charming)
- "Love Doesn't Stand a Chance" - Lana Parrilla (Queen Regina)
- "Revenge Is Gonna Be Mine" - Colin O'Donoghue (Captain Hook), Christopher Gauthier (Mr. Smee) and Chorus (Pirates)
- "Wicked Always Wins" - Rebecca Mader (Zelena) and Chorus (Munchkins)
- "Charmings vs. Evil Queen" - Ginnifer Goodwin (Snow White), Josh Dallas (Prince Charming), and Lana Parrilla (Queen Regina)
- "Emma's Theme" - Jennifer Morrison (Emma Swan)
- "A Happy Beginning" - Jennifer Morrison (Emma Swan), Colin O'Donoghue (Killian Jones), Ginnifer Goodwin (Snow White), Josh Dallas (David Nolan), Lana Parrilla (Regina Mills), Rebecca Mader (Zelena), Jared S. Gilmore (Henry Mills) and Chorus, including Raphael Sbarge (Archie Hopper), Keegan Connor Tracy (Blue Fairy), Tony Amendola (Geppetto), Beverley Elliott (Granny), Lee Arenberg (Grumpy), Mig Micario (Bashful), David Avalon (Doc), Michael Coleman (Happy), Gabe Khouth (Sneezy) and Faustino di Bauda (Sleepy)

The soundtrack album for the episode was released on May 5, 2017.

All tracks are written by Alan Zachary and Michael Weiner, except where noted.

Once Upon a Time: The Musical Episode
No.	Title	Writer(s)	Performer	Length
1.	"Powerful Magic"		Ginnifer Goodwin, Josh Dallas	3:04
2.	"The Queen Sings"		Lana Parrilla, Giancarlo Esposito, Lee Arenberg, Tony Amendola, Beverley Elliott, Ginnifer Goodwin, Josh Dallas	1:36
3.	"Love Doesn't Stand a Chance"		Lana Parrilla	2:34
4.	"Revenge Is Gonna Be Mine"		Colin O'Donoghue, Christopher Gauthier, Chorus (Pirates)	2:34
5.	"Wicked Always Wins"		Rebecca Mader	3:11
6.	"Charmings vs. Evil Queen"		Ginnifer Goodwin, Josh Dallas, Lana Parrilla	1:47
7.	"Emma's Theme"	Mark Isham; Alan Zachary; Michael Weiner	Jennifer Morrison	2:28
8.	"A Happy Beginning"	Isham; Zachary; Weiner	Jennifer Morrison, Colin O'Donoghue, Ginnifer Goodwin, Josh Dallas, Lana Parrilla, Rebecca Mader, Jared S. Gilmore, Chorus	2:51
Total length:				19:33

Chart (2017)	Peak position
UK Compilations (OCC)	32
UK Soundtrack Albums (OCC)	8
US Billboard 200	116
US Soundtrack Albums (Billboard)	11

== Reception ==
Christine Laskodi of TV Fanatic gave the episode full marks: 5.0 out of 5.0 Entertainment Weekly gave the episode an A.
