= The Black Fairy =

- Once Upon a Time episode
- Episode no.: Season 6 Episode 19
- Directed by: Alrick Riley
- Written by: Jerome Schwartz & Dana Horgan
- Production code: 619
- Original air date: April 30, 2017

Guest appearances
- Beverly Elliott as Granny; Stephen Lord as Malcolm; Giles Matthey as Morpheus/Gideon; Jaime Murray as Black Fairy/Fiona; Sara Tomko as Tiger Lily; Keegan Connor Tracy as Mother Superior/The Blue Fairy

Episode chronology
← Previous "Where Bluebirds Fly"	Next → "The Song in Your Heart"
- Once Upon a Time season 6

"The Black Fairy" is the nineteenth episode of the sixth season of the American fantasy drama series Once Upon a Time, which aired on April 30, 2017. In this episode, The Black Fairy's origins and the secret that she kept from Rumplestiltskin are revealed in the present day as Gold takes Emma and Gideon inside the dream world to seek out the truth, while Regina helps Zelena adjust to a normal life without her magic.

== Plot ==
=== Opening sequence ===
The three fairies, Fiona, Tiger Lily, and The Blue Fairy, are flying in the forest.

=== Event Chronology ===
The Storybrooke events take place after "Where Bluebirds Fly" while the events in the Enchanted Forest occurs before "Think Lovely Thoughts."

=== In The Characters' Past ===
Fiona and Malcolm bore a son on a winter's night, but soon learn from the child's fairy godmother - Tiger Lily - that as the Savior, he is prophesied to die fighting a great evil. Fretting over her son's future, Fiona starts to read up on all of the fairy lore that she can, in hopes of stopping the prophecy, and comes to believe that her son's undoing, who will be marked by a crescent, has to be born sometime soon. The amount of information she has gained from the fairy lore allows Fiona to cast a spell and turn herself into a fairy, and she convinces Tiger Lily to travel with her to all of the newborns of that winter to check for the birthmark. Finding that none have it, Fiona comes up with a new idea that requires being allowed into the sacred fairy vault, but Tiger Lily soon deduces that Fiona's plan involves combining two spells, which is against the rules, to create a curse - the Dark Curse - which will banish all of the children to a land without magic, eliminating the threat they pose to her son. Tiger Lily tries to stop Fiona, but this only results in having her heart ripped out by the now deranged fairy who, upon proclaiming her willingness to kill her own son's fairy godmother, has her magic completely darkened and the crescent appear on her wrist. Evil wasn't born this winter, but it was made. The Blue Fairy is able to return Tiger Lily's heart, but Tiger Lily makes one last attempt to reason with Fiona by offering her the Shears of Destiny to remove her powers; however, Fiona instead uses them to cut her son's fate as the Savior, believing that she needs her powers to protect him. Blue is unable to forgive this though, and so she takes Fiona's wand and uses the Ancient Wand to banish her to the Dark Realm. Before Fiona is dragged through the portal, she swears to do everything in her power to reunite with her son. The fairies return the baby to Malcolm, but he is now embittered by the loss of his wife. Malcolm remarks that once this child was perfect, and now because of him, he believes his wife to be dead. He starts his poor parenthood by giving his son the "perfect" name out of spite: Rumplestiltskin.

=== In Storybrooke ===
At the Pawn Shop, Gold attempts to use a scent to wake up Mother Superior, but after it fails, he steps outside and sends a newspaper box flying as Belle calms him down. When Emma comes out to tell Gold Mother Superior is awake they go back in so they can ask her about the missing wand. Unfortunately, after she tells them that it was in the center of Storybrooke, she becomes unstable; Emma discovers that Snow and David are actually not there and it is in fact Fiona (posing as Snow) and Gideon (posing as David.) Although Fiona escapes with Mother Superior, Gideon is stopped by Gold as Gold places the Anti-Magic Cuffs on Gideon, vowing to get his heart back. As everyone begins searching for the wand, Gold tells Belle and Gideon that he has a better idea. Using a powder to transport them to a Dream realm via Gideon's dream, Gold unleashed the powder on himself, his son, and surprisingly enough, Emma.

At the same time, Regina helps Zelena deal with recent loss of her magic by helping her learn how to drive a car, which she hopes will give her a chance to escape Storybrooke with her daughter and Henry before the final battle. As Snow, David and Hook search for the other part of the wand, Fiona has Mother Superior as her prisoner under the mines. At the Clock Tower, Snow calls Regina for help, Regina and Snow soon discovered that the wand is located inside Granny's. When they converge on the restaurant, they find it under the jukebox, and just in time for Fiona to show up. Regina challenges her to a duel for the wand, and as they step outside into the street, Fiona uses her magic on Regina, but Fiona gets hit by Zelena with the car; Fiona then disappears, after telling them that it's not over.

Inside the dream world, Emma learns that Gold wanted her with him so she wouldn't try anything that would prevent him from finding Gideon's heart. When Gold hears a crying baby coming from a cabin nearby, Emma discovered that this is Gold's dream. As they continued to search, Emma talks to Gold about being abandoned by family but Gold says his was different from Emma's and he has no remorse for his mother. Suddenly, Gideon appears, this time to thank his father for fighting for him. Realizing that he couldn't find his son's heart, Gideon suggested that Gold has an advantage by discovering Fiona's secret, if Gold is willing to face it. Thanks to Emma's advice, the three witness the flashback that shows Fiona become the Black Fairy and the revelation that Gold was destined to become the Savior. The three soon wake up afterwards, with Regina giving the other wand fragment to Gold, which he then reunites.

That night at the park, Gold tells Fiona he knows the truth, but as aforementioned in the flashback, she shows Gold what happened after she became the Black Fairy and changed her son's destiny that prevented him from becoming the Savior. As Fiona asked her son for her forgiveness Gold isn't sure if he wants to. Hours later at Granny's, Gold returns to tell Emma, Belle, Snow, David, Hook and Gideon that Fiona was banished, and gives Gideon his heart back. Gold then tells Belle and Gideon that he'll do whatever it takes to keep his family safe. At Emma's home, Hook asks Henry to be his best man at the upcoming wedding between Emma and Hook. Hook then gives the rings to Henry before telling Emma that he was stepping out for a while. Finally, at another location, it is discovered that Fiona was not banished and Gold is meeting with her. It turned out that they made a trade by allowing Gold to acquire Gideon's heart, in return for letting Fiona start the Final Battle, since Gold believes that he finally understands his mother, and that this would be the best way to protect his family. This meant that Emma is still the Savior meant to fight in the Final Battle. Fiona tells Gold that on Emma's wedding day, she will die.

== Reception ==
=== Reviews ===
- Christine Laskodi of TV Fantic gave the episode a great review: 4.7 out of 5.0
- Entertainment Weekly gave the episode a A+.
