= Mother (Once Upon a Time) =

- Once Upon a Time episode
- Episode no.: Season 4 Episode 20
- Directed by: Ron Underwood
- Written by: Jane Espenson
- Production code: 420
- Original air date: May 3, 2015

Guest appearances
- Kristin Bauer van Straten as Maleficent; Agnes Bruckner as Lilith "Lily" Page/Starla; Patrick Fischler as The Author/Isaac; Barbara Hershey as Cora; Rebecca Mader as Zelena/The Wicked Witch of the West; Sean Maguire as Robin Hood; Tony Perez as Henry (Valet); Wil Traval as Sheriff of Nottingham/Keith

Episode chronology
← Previous "Lily"	Next → "Operation Mongoose"
- Once Upon a Time season 4

"Mother" is the twentieth and penultimate episode of the fourth season of the American fantasy drama series Once Upon a Time, which aired on May 3, 2015.

In this episode, Emma Swan reunites Lily with Maleficent, Isaac must find a new ally as Gold's heart grows darker, and Regina and Robin Hood must deal with Zelena's pregnancy. Back in the Enchanted Forest, Regina is reunited with Cora upon her return from Wonderland, but questions her mother's intentions as to why she wants to "help" her.

== Title card ==
The dragon form of Lily flies through the forest.

== Plot ==
=== In the Characters' Past ===
In the Enchanted Forest before the first curse, the Evil Queen Regina stumbles upon a wedding being held on land that is off limits on her palace grounds. She makes it clear that she does not tolerate this kind of intrusion, by pulling the heart out of the groom and crushing it in front of his bride, the families, and friends. Regina then noticed a flower on Daniel's grave, and spots Cora, who pays her a visit on the anniversary of Daniel's death. Cora says she is there to apologize and make things right, and that she wants to see Regina happy by finding her the love that Tinker Bell spoke of. But Regina, having been upset with Tinker Bell previously, says she'll believe it when she sees it. Later on, Cora heads to the bar to find Robin, where she learns from the Sheriff of Nottingham that Robin is a thief and is now married. This gives Cora the idea to make the sheriff the true love for her daughter, by conjuring up a tattoo that is similar to the one Robin Hood had, and dressing him up in clothing similar to Robin"s. Unfortunately, Regina catches on to what Cora did when she notices the fake magical tattoo, and temporarily makes the lion tattoo come alive and attack him, to make the sheriff confess to Regina that Cora was hoping Regina would fall in love and have a child.

Regina ties the sheriff upside-down above a boiling pot in the dungeon as punishment, but Cora uses her magic to send him home and confronts Regina over her actions. Realizing what Cora did, in order to have her conceive a child so she can have an heir to the kingdom, Regina decides to sacrifice her hopes to bear any children, by taking a potion that will leave her unable to do so, in order to "hurt" her mother and to prevent Cora from manipulating her. Despite Cora's explanation that all she really ever wanted was for her to be happy, a pained Regina tells her mother that she just doesn't want to hear any more. Then, she tells Cora to return to Wonderland, and that she doesn't need her.

=== Outside Storybrooke ===
At the bar in New York City, Regina discusses with Robin, who had moved on with Zelena because she's pregnant with his child, and because he didn't realize until recently that "Marian" was Zelena in disguise. Robin tells Regina that Roland won't understand where his mother had gone, and Robin feels heartbroken to have lost his beloved Marian, because Zelena killed her back in the Enchanted Forest. As a result, Regina agrees to use a forgetting potion on Roland to make him forget about the time he spent with "Marian" after she was brought to Storybrooke by Emma Swan, so he won't have to go through the pain of losing his mother again. At Neal's apartment, Emma holds the dreamcatcher and tells Lily about Neal's having lived in the place and tells her that Zelena was responsible for his death. Zelena, who heard the conversation, feels the baby kick in her tummy, and taunts her by telling her not to trouble an "expectant mother." Regina and Robin arrive back at the apartment, and tells Emma, Lily, and Zelena to pack up because, "We're going to Storybrooke tonight." Emma drives her bug with Lily and Zelena, while Regina drives Robin's black minivan with Roland.

=== In Storybrooke ===
As Emma brings Lily back to Storybrooke, she is able to reunite her with Maleficent, while at the same time, Regina and Robin Hood must find a way to deal with Zelena, even if they can find a way to be together. During their get-together at Granny's, Lily asks her mother about what they are going to do about David and Mary Margaret, as she still has a grudge against them, but Maleficent states that she isn't up for revenge, and tries persuades Lily to stay in Storybrooke, begging her to stay because she won't be able to return if she leaves, and because Maleficent would turn back into dust if she tried to leave town with Lily. However, Lily still decides on leaving town, so Maleficent approaches Mary Margaret and David for help.

Hook reminds Gold that he will do whatever it takes to keep Emma from going dark, but as Isaac tells Mr. Gold that they need Emma in order to produce the ink needed for the quill since Emma has yet to succumb to darkness. Hook then taunts Gold, saying he knows that each time he does a bad deed, his heart will grow darker, so he won't be able to do anything to stop Hook. After Hook leaves, Gold begins to falter, as his heart is growing darker, and he uses his magic to transport him and the Author to his shop to look up information on obtaining Blood Magic, in case they can't get Emma to turn dark. However, Gold's health is continuing to decline, due to his dying heart. Regina suddenly shows up, wanting Isaac's services since she was the one who wanted to find Isaac first, only to have Mr. Gold making an offer to Regina to help her find the Magic Ink for Isaac, to get both of their happy endings, displaying the magic quill. Regina, however, states that she'll find the Magic Ink on her own and get her happy ending by herself. Gold objects, saying that if his heart dies, "Rumplestiltskin" will die, along with all of his goodness, and warns her that she would not want to deal with a "Dark One" who is entirely evil. However, Regina is entirely unconcerned, saying that he is in no position to bargain, and takes Isaac and the quill with her, even as Gold passes out, due to his weakening heart. Back at her vault, Regina as she learns that the energies of Emma's impending darkness is needed to procure the substance. Isaac then tells Regina that he was working for Mr. Gold because he protected him. Regina then shows Isaac a picture of Regina being with Robin Hood; Isaac states that it was one of his "experimental writings," which he was planning to write about it in a separate book, but never got the chance, which gives Regina an idea. Regina approaches Lily after she walked out on her mother at the diner (after Maleficent refused to help Lily carry out her revenge plans, option to restart their life as mother and daughter), and tells Regina that she wants Mary Margaret and David dead. Regina tells Lily that most of her darkness came from Emma, and that she needed it to be all worked up, which Lily responds to by telling her to buzz off. Unable to reason with her, Regina gives up on attempting to explain her actions to her, and then cuts Lily's hand to acquire her blood in order to obtain a sample of the darkness in her and turns it into magic ink. Then, she smiles and disappears while quoting "Welcome to Storybrooke." After Regina leaves, Lily's eyes glow yellow and become reptilian, as she becomes consumed by rage.

Shortly afterwards, Maleficent, Mary Margaret, and David later encounter Lily in her dragon form, but as Maleficent approaches her, Mary Margaret runs after Maleficent, convinced that she may not be safe around Lily. David shouts to Mary Margaret that Lily is out of control as she knocks Mary Margaret out, almost killing her, with Lily using her dragon flame to prevent David and Maleficent from reaching the unconscious Mary Margaret, before flying off. Emma shows up and immediately comes to her mother's aid, uses her powers to heal her. Lily regresses to her human form, and Maleficent confronts Lily, giving Lily her baby rattle, which she never got the chance to give her. Lily claims that she destroys everything she touches ever since Snow White and Prince Charming put Emma's darkness in her, and that no one would want to be with her. Maleficent replies by saying that she wouldn't mind "a little darkness." As Maleficent convinces Lily to stay for a week to teach her some tricks, Emma finally forgives Mary Margaret and David for what they did, but more importantly apologizes for hurting them.

After completing the task of extracting Lily's blood, Regina and Isaac visit Zelena's cell at the Storybrooke Hospital and states that she plans to write an ending for Zelena, and vows to have her written out of the story. Her half-sister replies by saying that she has gotten to know about Cora through Regina, claiming that she was exactly like Cora. As the Magic Ink is drying, Regina tells Zelena that Cora wasn't a better mother, and that she had wronged them both, as Robin Hood comes in. As Regina decides to spare Zelena for now, albeit locked up, this results in Regina's decision that she no longer needs the Author to find her happy ending. This gives Isaac the opportunity to write his way out of the hospital, and leaves a message that indicates a plan to write a new story that could change destiny. Isaac rendezvous with Mr. Gold at his shop, where upon meeting up with him, Isaac is instructed to start writing a new story in which villains win, in a new book, aptly titled Heroes and Villains, but Isaac already has a new chapter for in store for everyone involved, beginning with the phrase, "Once Upon A Time..."

== Reception ==
=== Ratings ===
The episode remained flat from the previous episode but had an increase with a 1.7/6 among 18-49s with 5.31 million viewers tuning in, retaining its lead among scripted programs in the 8 p.m. timeslot, although they were second among Sunday Night programs.

=== Reviews ===
The episode was met with positive reviews.

Hilary Busis of Entertainment Weekly noted "The Once team sure loves an antepenultimate episode that neatly wraps up a half season's-worth of story arcs, then pivots at the last second to pave the way for a two-hour finale that's meant to feel like its own semi-standalone movie—don't they? That strategy makes sense, of course; if you're going to spend the last two hours of a season writing alt-universe fanfiction about your own alt-universe fanfiction, you may as well make sure that it won't get bogged down with resolving issues like Emma's relationship with her parents and Maleficent's relationship with her daughter and Regina's relationship with her sister. (Pattern alert!) Getting all those things out of the way mean that next week's mega-sized blowout will be free to follow its own path, maybe even without having to waste time on a fairyback. Unfortunately, it also meant that this week's hour felt more like table setting than a main course."

Amy Ratcliffe of IGN said of the episode, "Tonight's Once Upon a Time melded the past with the present seamlessly and made Regina a more layered character. Even though we watched her crush a human heart with her bare hands, the flashback also managed to make her more relatable. She and others acted in unexpected ways but because it made sense and not merely for the sake of switching it up." Ratcliffe gave the episode an 8.4 rating out of 10.

In a review from Rickey.org, Nick Roman cites "“Mother” is a bit subdued when you consider this is the penultimate episode of the season. But taken in isolation, it's one of the best standalone episodes of Once Upon A Time this season, at least from a thematic standpoint. The notion that happiness is couched in the connections we make, and the love we foster through family ties, is significant enough, but it becomes far more profound when you consider that, ultimately, the only Author that can write our happy ending is us."

Christine Orlando of TV Fanatic gave the episode a 4.7 out of 5 stars.
