= Michael Weiner (actor) =

American actor and composer (born 1975)

- Born: April 18, 1975 (age 51); Los Angeles, California, U.S.
- Occupations: Actor, composer
- Years active: 1989-present

Michael Weiner (born April 18, 1975) is an American actor and composer. He is probably best known for his occasional role of "Kellogg 'Cornflake' Lieberbaum" on The Fresh Prince of Bel-Air. As a composer, Weiner co-produced the soundtrack album and wrote the score for the 1999 film Man of the Century and "The Song in Your Heart" episode of Once Upon a Time. He co-wrote the music and lyrics for the Broadway musical First Date, the rock musical Galileo, and 13 Going on 30 (musical).

== Filmography ==
=== Film ===
- Man of the Century (1999)
- Mr. Saturday Night (1992)
- All I Want for Christmas (1991)
- Coupe de Ville (1990)
- Relentless (1989)

=== Television ===
- Then We Got Help! (2010-2011)
- Felicity (1999)
- Beverly Hills, 90210 (1995)
- Hangin' with Mr. Cooper (1993)
- The Wonder Years (1989-1992)
- The Fresh Prince of Bel-Air (1990-1992)
- Parker Lewis Can't Lose (1992)

=== Short films ===
- The Murder of Donovan Slain (2004)
- The Fanatical Teachings of Julian Tau (2000)

== Theatre ==
=== Broadway ===
- Galileo (2026)
- First Date (2013)
