= Man of the Century =

- Directed by: Adam Abraham
- Written by: Adam Abraham; Gibson Frazier
- Produced by: Adam Abraham; Gibson Frazier
- Starring: Cara Buono; Brian Davies; Susan Egan; Dwight Ewell; Gibson Frazier; Frank Gorshin; David Margulies; Anthony Rapp; Marisa Ryan; Bobby Short
- Cinematography: Matthew Jensen
- Edited by: Frank Reynolds
- Music by: Michael Weiner
- Distributed by: Fine Line Features
- Release dates: October 29, 1999 (New York City, Los Angeles)
- Running time: 77 minutes (USA release); 80 minutes (Slamdance Film Festival)
- Country: United States
- Language: English
- Box office: $34,857

Man of the Century is a 1999 American comedy film directed by Adam Abraham and written by Abraham and Gibson Frazier. The film stars Frazier, Cara Buono, Susan Egan, Dwight Ewell and Anthony Rapp.

Man of the Century was filmed in black and white. Its working title was "Johnny Twennies".

== Plot ==
Man of the Century is a farce set in the 1990s about Johnny Twennies, a reporter stuck in the era of 1920s and 1930s pop culture.

== Main characters ==
- Johnny Twennies – (Gibson Frazier) A lovable, good-looking, fast-talking newspaper reporter whose manner is similar to that of a 1920s pulp magazine character.
- Virginia Clemens – (Cara Buono) A sweet girl who has an innocent school-girl crush on Johnny.
- Samantha Winter – (Susan Egan) Johnny's modern girlfriend.

== Critical reception ==
On the review aggregator website Rotten Tomatoes, 67% of 18 critics' reviews are positive. Metacritic, which uses a weighted average, assigned the film a score of 44 out of 100, based on 15 critics, indicating "mixed or average" reviews.

The New York Times wrote in its review, "This farcical riff on movie nostalgia echoes early Woody Allen (and Stanley Tucci's recent comedy, The Impostors) in its lampooning of the hoariest celluloid stereotypes. The movie is also shrewd enough to avoid wearing out its welcome. It's only 77 minutes long."
