= Operation Mongoose (Once Upon a Time) =

- Once Upon a Time episodes
- Episode nos.: Season 4 Episodes 21 & 22
- Directed by: Romeo Tirone (part 1); Ralph Hemecker (part 2)
- Written by: Edward Kitsis and Adam Horowitz
- Production codes: 421 & 422
- Original air date: May 10, 2015

Guest appearances
- Lee Arenberg as Grumpy / Leroy; Agnes Bruckner as Lilith "Lily" Page / Starla; Eion Bailey as Pinocchio / August Booth; Beverly Elliot as Granny / Widow Lucas; Patrick Fischler as the Author / Isaac; Rebecca Mader as Zelena / The Wicked Witch of the West; Sean Maguire as Robin Hood; Charles Mesure as Blackbeard; Keegan Connor Tracy as The Blue Fairy / Mother Superior; Timothy Webber as The Apprentice

Episode chronology
← Previous "Mother"	Next → "The Dark Swan"
- Once Upon a Time season 4

"Operation Mongoose" is a two-part story comprising the twenty-first and twenty-second episodes of the fourth season of the American fantasy drama series Once Upon a Time, both of which aired on May 10, 2015. Both episodes served together as the fourth season finale.

In this episode, Isaac becomes a wild card in Gold's scheme to change everyone's destiny as Emma, Regina, Mary Margaret, Hook, and David attempt to stop them. When Gold and Isaac forge ahead with their plans, they alter the destiny of everyone involved. Now, it's up to Henry to reverse the outcome and restore the destiny of his family, after he is drawn into the chaos, before it is too late.

== Title card ==
The lonely tower where Emma Swan is imprisoned. (Part 1, Part 2 in later releases)

A preening swan. (Part 2)

== Plot ==
=== In the Characters' past ===
In our world, 1966, Isaac Heller (the Author) is working at a television shop as a struggling writer trying to sell color tvs, until he gets a letter from Star Publishing saying that he is wanted for hire. He arrives to find a mostly empty room, with the Apprentice at the desk, who then lays out a selection of different writing materials and demands that Isaac choose one as a test. Isaac picks the magic quill, which seems to approve of him in turn. The Apprentice creates a magic door to another realm, and both he and the Author go through it.

=== In Storybrooke, before the alternate reality ===
Emma, Hook, Henry, Mary Margaret, David, Regina and Robin are in the library of the mansion, searching for a way to stop Gold and Isaac from enacting a new reality with the newly activated ink. They are joined by August, who shows them a drawing of the Sorcerer's Apprentice, who might be able to help them. Hook remembers the Apprentice from when he and Gold trapped him in the sorcerer's hat. With the help of the Blue Fairy, they release the Apprentice, who immediately says that there’s no time to waste. He tells them that they must find the storybook page depicting the door, as well as the door's key, for only then will they be able to lock Isaac back into the book where he belongs. The group splits up, with Henry, Hook, David and Mary Margaret heading back to the loft for the book and key, while Emma, Regina and the Apprentice head to Gold's pawnshop.

At the shop, Gold is clinging to life as Isaac finishes up writing the new book, titled Heroes & Villains. He plans on a new universe in the Enchanted Forest for the inhabitants of Storybrooke, while he writes a new ending for himself in the Land Without Magic. When he writes the final words, "The End," magic appears out of the book and begins to distort space and time.

=== The alternate reality ===
Henry awakens with the key in his hand at the loft, but runs downstairs to find that Hook, David and Mary Margaret have disappeared, along with the rest of the people of Storybrooke. He then drives himself to a restaurant in search of help, but notices a best-selling book on a shelf: a paperback version of Heroes & Villains by Isaac Heller.

Henry is able to locate Isaac at a book signing event, who is surprised to see him. Henry demands answers and Isaac reveals that his family is alive, but now exists in a different universe inside of his Heroes & Villains story, presenting Henry with the original storybook. Henry wasn't trapped along with the others because he wasn't born in a magical realm and he is also told that Emma wasn't either, as Isaac did not write a "savior" into the story. Isaac explains that he is also unable to alter events anymore, since he is no longer the Author after violating the Author's Code, which he did by writing himself a happy ending. After Isaac refuses to undo the events, Henry takes the key and uses it on a page of the book, transporting himself and Isaac into the altered Enchanted Forest.

Henry and Isaac find themselves trapped in the setting of the final chapter of Heroes & Villains. After Henry finds out that a happy ending for a hero in this universe will return things to the reality that he knows, Isaac knocks him out and binds him to a cart, and leaves him to be killed by an ogre. However, Henry is rescued by the "Ogre Slayer" Rumplestiltskin, who is now a heroic knight. Using a copy of Isaac's book as a guideline, Henry seeks out Regina, who is living life as a bandit "Snow White" in this reality. He tries to convince her that he is her son, but Regina does not believe him, since she does not have her memories of her time as the Evil Queen, and throws the book into a fire. Convinced that a true love's kiss between Regina and Robin could solve the problem, he suggests that she seek him out, although Regina already knows him as a fellow thief and rival.

Isaac, having escaped the ogres, searches for Henry, hoping that he is dead. He ends up falling into a trap and is found by the evil dwarves, led by Grumpy, who take him to Snow White, who is now the Evil Queen. Snow holds the heart that belongs to Prince Charming and uses it to command him with orders to behead Isaac, but Isaac schemes his way out of it by convincing them that he knows some of their secrets, since he wrote them in the first place. Isaac tells Snow that she can get her happy ending again (which was love with Prince James in this timeline), if she agrees to kill Henry along with Regina.

Ignoring Henry's advice, Regina proceeds to rob the royal carriage, but when she opens the door, she is confronted by Snow. Regina is asked about Henry's whereabouts, but after she offers no intel, Snow prepares to kill Regina with a fireball, until Robin Hood shows up and rescues her at the last second on horseback. He takes her back to his pub and tends to her wounds. The two drink to becoming new friends and declare their mutual respect for one another as outlaws in the forest, with Robin offering her leadership of his Merry Men. Regina starts to fall for him, but he then admits that he's leaving the thieving business in honor of his bride-to-be, who turns out to be Zelena. As she leaves the bar, she runs into Henry and informs him about the impending nuptials, which he realizes will mark the permanence of the alternate universe when the church bells ring. She then suggests that he try finding his other mother, if he truly believes that the Heroes & Villains tale is real. When Henry mentions that his other mother was known as "the Savior," Regina tells him of the legend of the Savior trapped in a tower in the middle of the ocean by the Evil Queen.

Rumple returns home to his wife Belle and their newborn baby son. Unfortunately, Isaac is there waiting, and tells him that his happy ending will be taken away if a boy named Henry succeeds in his quest to reverse the events of the new book. As he is without his real memories, Rumple does not believe Isaac, thinking he must be a demon trying to corrupt him, until Isaac mentions Baelfire, a secret from Rumple's past that he has been keeping from Belle. Isaac then tells him that he must thwart Henry and Regina's plan to stop Robin and Zelena's wedding in order for him to keep his happy ending.

Meanwhile, Henry goes to the Jolly Roger to recruit Hook and finds that the pirate is now employed by Captain Blackbeard. With this new Hook lacking in bravery, Henry has to take care of Blackbeard himself, before telling Hook that he must help him rescue his mother, Emma, from the tower. Henry and Hook sail to the tower and proceed to knock out the dark guard on duty. When Henry reaches Emma at the top, he is surprised to find that she has been able to keep her memories as part of a cruel curse. As the trio escape on the ship, Emma, while getting to know the new Hook, explains that the guard they knocked out was none other than Lily, who has the ability to transform into a dragon. Emma and Hook are able to shoot her down into the ocean with a cannon before she attacks. When they make a pit stop at a village, the three are caught by Snow and Charming, whom Lily had informed of their location. Since Snow does not recognize Emma as her daughter, she plans to kill both Emma and Henry. Hook, with no experience wielding a sword, tries to defend them. He battles Charming, and surprisingly defeats him by disarming him. After Hook is distracted, Charming is able to sneak upon him and fatally stab him in front of Emma.

Henry and Emma return to Regina's cave. Emma asks to speak with Regina alone, and tells her that if she tells Robin the truth about how she feels, everything will be fixed and they can both get their happy endings with the men they love, acknowledging that she herself never got the chance to tell Hook how she really felt before it was too late. The trio arrive at the chapel to stop the wedding, but before they can do so, Rumple suddenly appears to stop them. Emma and Henry try to distract Rumple as Regina tries to work up the nerve to interrupt the ceremony. Emma engages Rumple in a sword fight, until he is able to knock her out temporarily. He then aims his sword at Henry, but Regina jumps in front of him just in time to take the hit herself, opting to save Henry instead of pursuing Robin. Moments later, Robin and Zelena exit the chapel and Robin rushes to Regina's side as Zelena's envy starts to take over, causing her to start turning green, and she runs off. Robin tells Regina that she won't have to die alone.

Isaac reappears and Emma socks him in the face, and demands that he return everything to normal. However, because Isaac broke the Author's Code by writing himself a happy ending, the quill no longer works for him, as he is no longer the Author. Henry then picks up the quill and it activates, meaning that he has been appointed as the new Author. Using the blood of the "light savior," Regina, Henry writes, "Thanks to the hero Regina’s sacrifice, Isaac’s villainous work was undone."

=== In Storybrooke, after the alternate reality ===
As everyone awakens from the events back in Storybrooke, Emma runs to Hook and is relieved to find him alive, though she is still unable to admit her love for him. Gold also wakes up in his shop, back in his dying state. Isaac leaves him there to escape from town. Belle then enters the shop and finds him on the brink of death. She confronts him about his actions as of late and tells him that he already had his happy ending with her before he threw it all away for power. Belle admits that she does still care for him and Gold warns her to go far, far away, before his death is complete and only the Dark One remains.

Meanwhile, as Isaac approaches the town line, but his attempt to escape was cut by Mary Margaret and David, who ask about his motives for messing with stories as the author, including when they revealed how he was the one who made them both hurt Maleficent and Lily under his writing in order to hurt them both. Isaac tells them that a lifetime of bad bosses and others who pushed him around inspired him to hate "heroes" and side with the villains, who he thought never got a break. But Snow contradicts him by pointing out that his actions made him a villain by hurting others.

The Sorcerer's Apprentice tells Henry more about his new powers as the Author, which do not include the ability to resurrect the dead directly, such as his father Neal, since he died in the real world. He urges Henry to resist the temptation of altering stories with the quill, and Henry responds by snapping it in half, saying that "no one should have that much power."

That night, the people of Storybrooke are all celebrating at Granny's diner. Emma apologizes the second time to her parents after seeing them as villains in the alternate world, which reflected how she unjustly mistreated them. Afterwards, Lily tells Emma that she wants to find the identity of her father and plans on staying in Storybrooke during her search. Belle shows up to tell everyone that the last bit of humanity in Gold's heart is about to be consumed by the Darkness, and the group finds Gold unconscious in his shop. The Apprentice then removes Gold's nearly-black heart from his chest, and uses his power to pull the Darkness out of Gold's heart and transfer it into the Sorcerer’s Hat, which severs Gold's link to the Dark One's Dagger in the process. He then puts a pure white heart back into Gold, and casts a preservation spell on Gold, to keep him alive while they figure out how to help him recover. However, the hat is unable to contain the Darkness, and it breaks out, before attacking and entering the Apprentice. Emma uses her light magic to force the Darkness back out of the Apprentice, and the Darkness exits the shop. As the Apprentice lies dying, he tells Emma and Hook that, long ago, centuries before their births, the Sorcerer battled the Darkness and tethered it to a human soul with the Dark One's Dagger, and now that it's free, the only person who can prevent the Darkness from destroying all the realms is the Sorcerer himself: Merlin.

The two then meet Mary Margaret, David, Regina, and Robin as they scour the streets of Storybrooke for the Darkness, which then reappears from above and attempts to possess Regina. Holding the Dagger, Emma volunteers to tether herself to the Darkness to prevent it from undoing all of Regina's progress, telling her loved ones that she trusts that they'll find a way to remove the darkness from her once again. She finally tells Hook that she loves him, after which she plunges the Dagger into the dark vortex. The Darkness violently surrounds Emma as she gradually absorbs it, before the Darkness lifts into the sky and condenses on Emma. When it dissipates, only the dagger is left behind. As the shot zooms in on it, the Dagger now reads the name of the new Dark One, Emma Swan.

== Cultural references ==
- The opening scene (the television shop) features the ABC color logo on the screen, as 1966 was the year the network switched from black and white to color.
- The setting (December 1966) was the same month and year that Walt Disney died. This also tied in with the origin of Isaac assuming the role of the Author, as hinted in previous episodes. The letter that Isaac opens in the television store in the beginning of the episode is dated December 15, 1966, the date of Disney's death.
- The address of Isaac's home in New York City posted on the letter is the same address as the childhood home of Woody Allen, whom creators Adam Horowitz and Edward Kitsis have cited as their inspiration.
- The address of Star Publishing posted on the letter is the actual address of the Actors Movement Studio, which is located in Manhattan.
- Isaac's boss mentions Gimbels, which was across the street from the store. The department store chain went out of business by 1987.
- The scene where Henry is alone in Storybrooke references the 1985 film Day of the Dead.

== Production ==
- The names of the reviewers that were listed on the Heroes & Villains book are those of Once Upon a Time graphic designer and productions staff member Neil Westlake, art director Cheryl Marion and conceptual designer Keith Lau. Another crew member on the series, property master Bill Burd, is listed as an author of Shadow Precinct, which was one of the books that were displayed in the diner Henry stopped by.
- The episode was to feature Raphael Sbarge as Archie Hopper/Jiminy Cricket, but the producers decided not to use the characters due to budgetary reasons and time constraints.

== Reception ==
=== Ratings ===
The episode's ratings continued to remain flat from the previous episode with a 1.7/6 among 18-49s but saw 5.42 million viewers tuning in, a 1.2% increase. The numbers were down from the previous season's finale, which had a 2.3 rating.

=== Reviews ===
The episode was met with excellent reviews.

Hillary Busis of Entertainment Weekly said, "Tonight’s two-hour finale, though, indicates that Once is stepping away from that formula. Next season won’t center on our heroes rallying together to defeat some flashy, newly introduced foe based on a classic Disney villain." She then noted, "The last thing Once ever needs is more characters, and Merlin notwithstanding, tonight’s cliffhangers indicate a show that’s trying to get back to basics. Expect to spend the bulk of next season—or at least its first half—with the show’s main ensemble, rather than a new batch of screen-time-hogging allies and antagonists. (Well, unless everyone ends up taking an extended trip to Camelot.)"

Amy Ratcliffe of IGN said of the episode, "The Season 4 finale of Once Upon a Time relished in the lighthearted aspects of telling a story set in a fairy tale world while also hitting some emotional notes and developing characters in new ways. They also took a bold step forward by turning The Savior into the Dark One. The inventive twist opens the door to so many opportunities, and it's heartening to see the series continuing to change the game." Ratcliffe gave the episode a 9.2 rating out of 10.

In a review from Rickey.org, Nick Roman said, "Once Upon a Time topped itself in ways I didn’t expect with "Operation Mongoose": the two-hour movie event delivered a season finale that could have played out as a series finale, if the show had not already been renewed for Season 5. But if the show can keep up this level of storytelling into its fifth year, then I’m glad it’s not going anywhere. This was easily the show’s best season finale yet."

Christine Orlando of TV Fanatic gave the episode a 4.7 out of 5 stars.

The ending scene with Emma going dark ranked number two in Entertainment Weekly's Season Finale Awards for "Twist You Saw Coming a Mile Away." Lily ranked number three for "Breakout Character." The finale placed fourth for "Biggest Regret That I Didn't Watch Live."
