= Snow Drifts =

- Once Upon a Time episode
- Episode no.: Season 3 Episode 21
- Directed by: Ron Underwood
- Written by: David H. Goodman & Robert Hull
- Production code: 321
- Original air date: May 11, 2014

Guest appearances
- Rebecca Mader as Zelena/Wicked Witch of the West; Sean Maguire as Robin Hood; Keegan Connor Tracy as Blue Fairy/Mother Superior; Meghan Ory as Ruby/Red; Raphael Sbarge as Archie Hopper/Jiminy Cricket; Beverley Elliott as Granny; Anastasia Griffith as Abigail/Kathryn; Tony Amendola as Geppetto/Marco; David-Paul Grove as Doc; Gabe Khouth as Sneezy; Faustino Di Bauda as Sleepy; Alex Zahara as King Midas; Mig Macario as Bashful; Christopher Gauthier as Smee; Charles Mesure as Black Beard; Christie Laing as Maid Marian

Episode chronology
← Previous "Kansas"	Next → "There's No Place Like Home"
- Once Upon a Time (season 3)

"Snow Drifts" is the twenty-first episode of the third season of the American fantasy drama series Once Upon a Time, and the show's 65th episode overall, which aired on May 11, 2014. The episode serves as the first of a two part episode for the third season finale and was written by David H. Goodman & Robert Hull and directed by Ron Underwood.

In this episode, everyone in Storybrooke joins Mary Margaret and David as they prepare to give their newborn son a coronation, while the time traveling portal that Zelena created before her demise comes to life, and takes Emma and Hook back to the Enchanted Forest before the events of the original curse. Emma and Hook must find a way to return to Storybrooke, but while attempting to do so, they accidentally interrupt Snow and Charming's first meeting, and they must repair the timeline with Rumplestiltskin's help before it is too late to undo the damage.

== Title card ==
A time travel wormhole portal opens in the Enchanted Forest.

== Plot ==
=== Event chronology ===
The Boston flashbacks happen years after "Awake" and before "Breaking Glass" while the Enchanted Forest past events happen after "A Tale of Two Sisters" and changing the events of "Snow Falls" and before "There's No Place Like Home".

=== In the Characters' Past ===
In the past (our world) a young girl leaves with a couple in a car from an adoption agency, where an eleven-year-old Emma Swan is standing, looking upset that she'll never have a perfect family, but the foster manager comes up to her and tells Emma, "Don't worry, you'll find a home too, Emma."

=== In Storybrooke ===
In the present day, Emma looks happy and sees Mary Margaret holding her baby boy as she prepares for the upcoming coronation even though they haven't named him yet. Henry is looking for apartments and both Henry and Mary Margaret ask Emma what she thinks. Emma changes the subject and starts thinking why her parents are trying to expand the time they need to name the unnamed baby by using an age-old tradition. Meanwhile, Regina and Robin Hood are sharing some romantic time together. She tells him about how Tinker Bell told her about them being soulmates, how she saw the lion tattoo but didn't approach him in the pub. However, Robin is happy to hear that, saying it must be the right time for them now. Later on at Granny's, everyone is recalling or retelling stories of how Mary Margaret and David originally met back in the Enchanted Forest and how they kept running into one another and were destined to be together. When Emma reveals her desire to return to New York City with Henry in an attempt to leave Storybrooke behind, Regina and the others exclaim in protest. Suddenly Gold notices an orange beam rising in the distance, which he tells them is the time portal. As this starts to happen, Hook exploited Emma in front of everyone that she wants to go back to New York City and everyone including Regina doesn't like the idea. Emma then walks out, and Hook follows her, taking the fairytale book with him. Meanwhile, Regina, David, Belle, Gold, Robin, and Mary Margaret visit the jail to see if Zelena had died around the same time as the portal's opening. They see on the jail's surveillance video that she committed suicide and are unaware that Gold altered the video to make it look like she killed herself.

As they stop by the park, Emma tells Hook that she is confused about going back to New York City. Hook then hands Emma the book, telling her Henry hoped it would remind her where they're from. The conversation is cut short when they notice the time-travel orange beam forming and Emma runs towards the barn, where the doors burst open. The beam pulls Emma towards the vortex, and Hook tries to hold her back by digging his hook into the ground with Emma holding onto his leg. Emma can't hold on and is immediately sucked into the portal. Hook says "One of these days I'm going to have to stop chasing this woman," and jumps in after her. The portal closes as her cellphone, which is left behind in the barnyard, is ringing with a call from David, who was trying to warn her.

=== In the Enchanted Forest's New Past ===
Seconds later, both Emma and Hook land in the Enchanted Forest. It turns out that, while going through the portal, Emma was thinking of her parents' first meeting, which is how and where they ended up. The two then come across the wanted signs for Snow White from the past and then stumble onto a village, where they see Regina terrorizing the villagers demanding that they tell her where her stepdaughter is. Regina proves that she is not kidding by having a woman arrested for helping Snow. Emma wants to help the woman, but Hook warns her about changing the future so they can't save the woman, since the villagers that were threatened by The Evil Queen included Pinocchio, Geppetto, and Granny. Around the same time, both Prince James (Charming) and Abigail are in the carriage in the moments before Snow and James are due to meet. Snow cuts a tree down to make her highway robbery, causing the carriage to stop as she is in a tree waiting. As Charming gets out the carriage to investigate, Emma was entranced with amazement and excitement to see her parents in action and seeing them in their true identities for the first time. But she inadvertently makes the biggest mistake in altering the timeline by making an accidental noise and surprises Snow, who falls and runs away, empty handed without taking the jewels from the carriage, and preventing her parents from meeting for the first time. Emma discovers that she disrupted the past and realizes that the only way to stop this altered timeline is by seeking out the only person capable of correcting this mistake, namely Rumplestiltskin. As they approach Rumplestiltskin's castle, Rumplestiltskin himself appears out of nowhere ready to kill Hook (as he still holds a grudge after Hook stole his wife, Milah, and took the magic bean Rumplestiltskin was going to use to find his son, Baelfire) but Emma then reveals to him that he will create the curse that he hopes will one day find his son Baelfire, and killing Hook will further destroy the timeline. As the pages in the book start to become blank, time is starting to run out for Emma to fix what she has done, and Rumplestiltskin tells her the only way to correct this is to go to the ball that will be held at King Midas' palace.

Seeing that Snow wants passage after failing to secure one from Blackbeard, they hatch a plan to have her steal the ring for passage out of the forest by using Hook’s ship, which means they have to pay a visit to the tavern to distract a past version of Killian Jones, so Hook sends Emma to distract the Past Hook while he's drinking with his mates. The Future Hook suddenly becomes jealous of Past Hook for flirting with Emma, as she keeps Past Hook occupied while Future Hook offers Snow a deal, but things get out of hand when Smee first becomes confused by the difference in his captain, and second when Past Hook shows up while Future Hook is still there. Emma orders him to leave, and Hook looks on jealously as the Past Hook comes on and kisses her. The Future Hook then taps his past self on the shoulder and punches him. Hook replies that he was asking for it, saying that he'll blame the rum for his actions.

Later that night at Midas' palace, Emma and Hook watch to see what happens when Rumplestiltskin appears. He gives them an invitation and alters their looks so they can blend in. As they enter the palace, Emma gives them the aliases "Princess Leia" and "Prince Charles" in front of King Midas, and as they take a waltz together, they see Charming and Abigail together, but she doesn't want to dance with James. The Evil Queen arrives at the palace to ask Midas to search the place just in time for Snow to show up and take the ring. As expected, James captures Snow, altering the timeline of the first time they met (and she hits him, this time with a jewelry box instead of a rock). As she makes her escape, Emma sees her running and Charming yelling at her to stop and saying that he'll find her (another altered timeline in their encounter), only to have Emma (who finds the ring left behind by Snow and hides it from plain view) get caught by Regina and arrested for helping Snow escape. The story continues in the following episode.

== Reception ==
=== Ratings ===
The episode, along with "There's No Place Like Home," pulled in respectable numbers, placing a 2.3/7 with 6.8 million viewers tuning in (as they were combined as a two-hour episode), winning in both the 8 pm and 9 pm timeslots.

== See also ==
- Snowdrift, a drift of snow
