= Heart of Gold (Once Upon a Time) =

- Once Upon a Time episode
- Episode no.: Season 4 Episode 17
- Directed by: Billy Gierhart
- Written by: Scott Nimerfro & Tze Chun
- Production code: 417
- Original air date: April 12, 2015

Guest appearances
- Patrick Fischler as Isaac/Author/Peddler; Christie Laing as Marian/Disguised Zelena; Rebecca Mader as Zelena/Wicked Witch of the West; Sean Maguire as Robin Hood; Wil Traval as Sheriff of Nottingham/Keith; Raphael Alejandro as Roland; Jason Burkart as Little John; Jennifer Cheon as Nurse; Paul Kloegman as Carriage Driver; Tristan Shire as Oz Guard

Episode chronology
← Previous "Best Laid Plans"	Next → "Sympathy for the De Vil"
- Once Upon a Time season 4

"Heart of Gold" is the seventeenth episode of the fourth season of the American fantasy drama series Once Upon a Time, which aired on April 12, 2015.

In this episode, Emma Swan must deal with the truth about her parents' past with Maleficent, while she tracks down the Author, whom she must find before Gold does. As Gold's quest for his happy ending grows more urgent, he resorts to blackmailing Regina in order to help him. Nine weeks before this, Mr. Gold needs Robin's help. Back in the Enchanted Forest, Rumplestiltskin enlists Robin Hood to go to Oz to steal an elixir from Zelena.

== Title card ==
The Emerald City looms beyond the forest.

== Plot ==
=== In The Characters' Past ===
==== In the Sherwood Forest ====
Back in "Sherwood Forest many years ago," Robin Hood is at his bar, when the Sheriff of Nottingham shows up and threatens his nemesis over taxes and gives him just two days to get his money in order. That night after closing, Rumplestiltskin appears with a proposition: Rumplestiltskin will solve Robin’s monetary issues, if Robin will steal something for him in return. Rumplestiltskin informs Robin that they’ll have to go to a realm called the Land of Oz to acquire a potion called the elixir of the wounded heart, which can cure hearts both physically and emotionally. Robin goes through a portal into Oz, where after the portal lands on a guard after he steps out, Robin runs into Will Scarlet, who was just captured by the aforementioned guard, and frees him. The two then agree to work together, though Will wants some of the elixir for himself.

Robin then takes the guard’s clothing as a disguise and uses it to break into the Wicked Witch of the West’s palace, where he bottles some of the elixir, only to have Zelena catch him, immediately assuming he is there on Rumplestiltskin’s behalf. He narrowly escapes but lies to Will, telling him that he didn’t get to gather any of the elixir. Before Robin leaves to return to Sherwood Forest, Will tells him that he is trying to mend his own broken heart, which has been crushed since his sister died. As Robin leaves to return to his realm, Will notices that a vial of the elixir has been sneakily placed in his pocket by Robin, whose tender heart was moved by Will's tale.

Back in the Sherwood Forest, Robin is in his bar all alone when the Sheriff shows up looking for his money and is ready to cuff Robin, when The Merry Men led by Little John appear with arrows ready on aim; they then steal the Sheriff’s money and distribute it to the poor townspeople. As Robin and Marian make plans to stay together on the run, he gives her the six-leaf clover of Oz, which would later be the catalyst for Marian's demise by Zelena during Emma Swan and Captain Hook's stint in the Enchanted Forest.

==== Outside Storybrooke ====
Nine weeks earlier, after Robin kissed Regina before stepping over the magical boundary of Storybrooke (and nine weeks before the aforementioned phone call that Regina made) to leave with Marian and Roland, they have entered New York City, where Robin tells Marian that Regina gave her the keys to Neal/Baelfire’s apartment, but as they check for directions, a man on a bike snatches Marian’s purse and Robin tries to give chase, then steals a horse and goes after the thief; he runs the guy down and tackles him then stops himself, saying a thief who steals from those in need has no honor. Unfortunately, as they have now settled in the apartment, Marian is already not happy about living in New York City, despite her feelings about Robin Hood and Regina. They then hear someone knocking on the door, and they see Gold there; he wants Robin and his family out of his son's apartment, saying that Regina told him about the Author and what will happen to her if her happy endings do not come true, but even as Robin refuses to give up the place Gold starts suffering chest pains and is taken to the hospital, where he is told that he had a heart attack. Gold explains to Robin the only thing that can cure him now is the elixir of the wounded heart, which is actually being kept safe nearby at a place called "The Wizard of Oak." Gold tells Robin where to find it, and Robin breaks in to steal it just in time to escape the police, upsetting Marian in the process.

Robin then brings the elixir to Gold in the hospital, then makes a deal that in exchange for the elixir that Gold allows Robin and his family to keep the house. As Gold drinks it, he realizes it doesn’t work, when out of nowhere, Marian enters the room with the real elixir, having swapped the real bottle; it turns out Marian was actually Zelena, who Gold discovers had been alive all along and not dead. Zelena's soul had actually travelled back in time, where she killed the real Marian back in the Enchanted Forest, by using the six-leaf clover of Oz to make Marian vanish and to transform herself into Marian. This was part of her plan to ruin Regina’s happiness, and to add the misery it's now causing to Gold, which is certainly making Zelena happy too. Gold briefly flatlines, then comes to afterwards with Zelena telling him that she wanted to make Robin fall in love with her, but he just couldn’t, making her realize that she needed the Author to change her story, and since Gold is the one that can find him, she proposes that in exchange for the only elixir that could save him, he agrees to the deal to find the Author.

As Gold is finally released from the hospital, Robin give him some possessions that were left in the house while they discuss about Marian and how Robin doesn’t feel anything for her anymore, although Gold, neglecting to tell Robin the truth about what happened to his actual wife, tells Robin to pursue his happiness with whoever that may be. Robin then goes home and tells "Marian" that he wants to stay with her, no matter what they have to go through, and to prove it he deletes Regina’s phone number from his cell phone in front of "Marian." As Robin starts kissing his "wife," he is unaware that from what viewers see in the mirror’s reflection, it's Zelena kissing Robin instead. This would eventually later lead to the phone call that Regina made later on as alluded by Gold in Storybrooke nine weeks later.

=== In Storybrooke ===
As Emma and her parents search the woods for The Author, Mary Margaret tells Emma that they met him before, and David adds that he was the one responsible for placing them on the path to destroy Maleficent’s child. David explains that they didn't understand what they did out of fear, but Emma snaps and says they’ve been lying to her and adds that she became the anointed savior because they destroyed someone else’s soul. Meanwhile, the Author is ahead of them, trying to make a magic quill when Gold shows up and says there are no enchanted trees in Storybrooke. Gold produces a magic quill, thereby convincing the Author to come with him, and they disappear in a magic cloud.

Back in Regina’s crypt, Regina wakes up and discovers her hands are tied and sees Gold standing there, as he tells her that he has the author, but says he can’t let her find her happiness at his expense, adding that he lost everything and she will too if she doesn’t obey. Regina then panics after she sees Gold with the phone number for Robin Hood that she had in her pocket, but then uses his magic to free her so she can call him.

It's nine weeks later after the events of the outside world, when Regina called Robin, only to be in shock to have her half-sister Zelena answer, explaining her domestic life with Robin, and tells Regina that they will be seeing each other very soon. After the phone call, Gold tells Regina that if she doesn't help him turn Emma's heart dark, he'll order Zelena on the phone to kill Robin. However Regina refuses to work for Gold and tells him, she won't let him turn Emma into a monster, the same way he did to her.

== Cultural references ==
- When Robin enters Oz, the magic portal lands on the guard, and his feet are sticking out, just like the Wicked Witch of the East from the novel.
- The Six-Leaf Clover is from L. Frank Baum's children's novel The Patchwork Girl of Oz.
- The Enchanted Bow painting says "The Omaha Circus and Freak Show". In the novel, Omaha was the name of the Wizard's birthplace.
- When Robin Hood and Will Scarlet hug, there is an overhead shot where you can see the Tin Man from The Wonderful Wizard of Oz lying on the side of the Yellow Brick Road.
- The scene when Mr. Gold's heart stops and Zelena says "What a beautiful echo" is a reference to The Wizard of Oz scene where Dorothy bangs on the Tin Woodman's chest and the Scarecrow says, "Beautiful! What an echo".

== Reception ==
=== Ratings ===
The episode dropped slightly from the previous episode, as it posted a 1.6/5 among 18-49s with 5.17 million viewers tuning in, but at the same time helped the series win its timeslot although it did placed second among the most watched scripted programs that night behind A.D.: The Bible Continues, which had more viewers.

=== Reviews ===
The episode was met with mixed reviews.

Amy Ratcliffe of IGN said of the episode, "The exploration of Robin Hood's origins slowed tonight's Once way down as everything about the trip to fairy tale land seemed like it was about forcing connections and parallels. However, in the modern day, learning Marian is actually Zelena almost made up for it. They shouldn't get in the habit of bringing back blasts from the past, but Zelena has the potential to shake things up so much that her return is worth it. Since she's also searching for the Author though, it would have been better to tie him more into the story considering what happened in the previous episode." Ratcliffe gave the episode a 7.2 rating out of 10.

Hilary Busis of Entertainment Weekly notes: "Like it or not, you’ve got to admit that Zelena’s return was the most exciting part of an episode that otherwise read as wheel-spinning."

In a review from Rickey.org, Nick Roman cites that "This was one of the weirdest Once Upon A Time episodes in recent memory. Flashbacks within flashbacks, and a story that diverges from the overarching narrative we’ve been following for this entire half season all contribute to making “Heart of Gold” feel like it’s from a different show entirely." but added that despite the subpar twist, the episode's plotline was done well.
