= Ill-Boding Patterns =

- Once Upon a Time episode
- Episode no.: Season 6 Episode 13
- Directed by: Ron Underwood
- Written by: Andrew Chambliss & Dana Horgan
- Production code: 613
- Original air date: March 19, 2017

Guest appearances
- Sean Maguire as Robin of Locksley; Giles Matthey as Morpheus/Gideon; Raphael Sbarge as Archie Hopper; Keegan Connor Tracy as Mother Superior; Torstein Bjørklund as Beowulf; Brandon Spink as Baelfire

Episode chronology
← Previous "Murder Most Foul"	Next → "Page 23"
- Once Upon a Time season 6

"Ill-Boding Patterns" is the thirteenth episode of the sixth season of the American fantasy drama series Once Upon a Time, which aired on March 19, 2017. In this episode, Gold must find a way to stop Gideon from going dark as he prepares to kill Emma, while Hook must find a way to hide the truth about Robert from her, and Wish Realm Robin seeks an ally to help escape Storybrooke. In the past, the legend of Beowulf and how he crossed paths with Rumplestiltskin is revealed.

== Plot ==
=== Opening sequence ===
An Ogre from the Ogre Wars is featured in the forest.

=== Event chronology ===
The Enchanted Forest events take place after "Desperate Souls" and before "Nasty Habits." The Storybrooke events take place after "Murder Most Foul".

=== In the Characters' past ===
In the pre-first curse Enchanted Forest, the events of the first Ogre Wars are detailed. A young soldier is being encouraged by his leader, Beowulf, to keep fighting against the creatures. Beowulf then displays the sword, Hrunting, that Emma will take possession of in the future and leads his men into battle. However, despite killing some ogres, his men are all killed, and he is left as the only survivor. When Beowulf sees an ogre general and goes after it, it knocks his sword out of his hand and moves in to kill him, but then, Rumplestiltskin intervenes. He uses his dagger to genocide all of the creatures. His actions would cause a deeper rift between Rumplestiltskin and the teenage Baelfire. Later on at a village, the people ask Rumplestiltskin to defend them against a creature named Grendel. Baelfire, hoping that saving the village will restore Rumplestiltskin's good name, believes that he can do it without resorting to dark magic, so Rumplestiltskin gives him the dagger to keep him from using it.

When they arrived to the cave to draw out Grendel, Rumplestiltskin and Baelfire discover it was a setup by Beowulf, who wanted revenge on Rumplestiltskin for denying him victory during the Ogre Wars, by setting him up to frame the Dark One for the murder of the villagers. After Baelfire fails to stop Beowulf, Baelfire summons Rumplestiltskin, who defeats Beowulf. Baelfire wants him to stop Beowulf, but Rumplestiltskin refuses, opting to send them to a new village instead, but in the end, Baelfire killed Beowulf after he commanded his father to do so. Rumplestiltskin also collects the sword Hrunting after this. The events convinces Baelfire that they should use Dark Magic to protect themselves, but Rumplestiltskin feels otherwise, and secretly gives Baelfire a forgetting potion he slipped inside his drink to make him forget about what happened, to keep him from going dark. Unfortunately, Baelfire's memory would later come back when he saw Hrunting, and this time, he accused his father of killing Beowulf.

=== In Storybrooke ===
At Granny's, Archie finds Hook drinking, now that he realized that he killed Robert, who happens to be Emma's grandfather; however, he decides not to divulge details. When he later visited Emma at the house, he wants to tell Emma the truth, but Emma thinks he is keeping something from her and she shows him the engagement ring that he wanted to give her, and she tells him that she will marry him. Hook gets down on one knee and proposes, but decides not to tell Emma about Robert, by keeping that to himself.

Meanwhile, Belle and Mother Superior search for Gideon, believing that he is after the sword Hrunting that Emma had the night they first met, and as expected they were right, because at the Sheriff's Station, Gideon is caught by Gold while trying to obtain the sword fragment and his father uses his magic to knock Gideon out. At the Clock Tower, Gideon comes to and is tied up, with the magic-draining cuff on, as Gold tells him about what happened during the first Ogre Wars when he attempted to stop it. Gideon then told his father about what the Black Fairy did to him and why he wanted revenge. Gideon soon catches on to Gold's plan to erase his memory after he was given a tea that was laced with the forgetting potion, but his time with the Black Fairy has shown him how to counter it, and during a hug, he takes the dagger to control his father. Gideon then uses the dagger to force Gold to reveal the sword's origin and its forger, and Gold tells him that it was the Blue Fairy who created it. As Gideon keeps Gold from stopping him, he goes to take Mother Superior's powers after he freezes her, Gold arrives and drains her magic for him, so Gideon won't go dark. This ends up putting the Mother Superior into a coma-like state. After the sword Hrunting is newly forged, Gideon returns the dagger to Gold.

At the same time, Robin has shown up at Zelena's place, and the witch is stunned to find him there. He wants to leave Storybrooke, and she agrees to help him, since she also wants to leave for New York City. However, Regina is waiting for them at the city limits, having caught on to Robin stealing the heart from the vault, and the anti-magic potion. However, when Robin attempts to use the anti-magic potion, it fails to break the protection spell, and instead, the barrier blasts him backwards. Knowing that he is stuck in Storybrooke, Regina, now convinced that the Wish Realm Robin will never live up to the one she remembers, offers to help him leave if he wants to do so. Later on, Regina and Zelena finally come to an understanding as sisters, but suddenly become aware that the Regina's other half, The Evil Queen, is missing from her cage. Unfortunately, the "serum" Evil Queen (still in her form as a cobra) doesn't stay missing for long, because afterward, Robin is bitten by the aforementioned creature, and it turns out that the anti-magic potion really works, since the spilled anti-magic potion on Robin's hand restores The Evil Queen to her normal form. Then, the Evil Queen offers to take Robin on a tour of Storybrooke from her viewpoint.

== Production ==
Josh Dallas, Ginnifer Goodwin, and Jared Gilmore are credited but do not appear in this episode.

=== Title ===
The episode's title appears in a passage between the lines 1455 to 1458 of the poem Beowulf, in which Hrunting–the sword given to Beowulf by Unferth–is described: "The iron blade with its ill-boding patterns had been tempered in blood".

== Reception ==
=== Reviews ===
- Christine Laskodi of TV Fantic gave the episode a mild review: 3.0 out of 5.0
- Entertainment Weekly gave the episode a C.
