= A Wondrous Place =

- Once Upon a Time episode
- Episode no.: Season 6 Episode 15
- Directed by: Steve Pearlman
- Written by: Jane Espenson & Jerome Schwartz
- Production code: 615
- Original air date: April 2, 2017

Guest appearances
- Giles Matthey as Morpheus/Gideon; Deniz Akdeniz as Aladdin; Karen David as Princess Jasmine; Nick Eversman as Liam; Oded Fehr as Jafar; Gil McKinney as Prince Eric; JoAnna Garcia Swisher as Ariel; Faran Tahir as Captain Nemo

Episode chronology
| ← Previous "Page 23" | Next → "Mother's Little Helper" |
- Once Upon a Time season 6

"A Wondrous Place" is the fifteenth episode of the sixth season of the American fantasy drama series Once Upon a Time, which aired on April 2, 2017. In this episode, when Gideon sends Hook out of Storybrooke, the pirate must find a way to return to Emma, who is being tempted to join Regina and Snow during a ladies' night out, while the origins behind the disappearance of Agrabah are revealed.

== Plot ==
=== Opening sequence ===
Jasmine's flying carpet is seen in the forest.

=== Event chronology ===
The Agrabah events take place after "The Savior" and the Once Upon a Time in Wonderland episode "Trust Me", and after Prince Eric left for Agrabah in "Ariel". The Enchanted Forest events take place after "Broken Heart" and after Jasmine and Aladdin left Storybrooke in "Wish You Were Here". The Storybrooke events take place after "Page 23".

=== In the characters' past ===
In Agrabah, Jasmine's father, the Sultan, is looking for suitors for his daughter, and Jafar answers the request, except he has an ultimatum: if Jasmine doesn't accept his hand in marriage, Agrabah will be destroyed by sunset. Later on, while chasing down a thief, Jasmine runs into Ariel, who is looking for Prince Eric. Believing that finding Eric will bring his army to protect her Kingdom from Jafar, Jasmine and Ariel team up and track down Eric via Jasmine's magic carpet, only to discover that Prince Eric was actually Jafar in disguise. Ariel suggests that Jasmine use a vial of powder she stole from Jafar to defeat him, but Jafar uses his magic to send Ariel and the vial back to the sea.

Towards the beginning of sunset, Jasmine agreed to marry Jafar, in exchange for sparing the lives of her people. She hands him the ring, but Jafar soon reveals that he never really wanted to rule Agrabah, since its people had always scorned him. He was actually interested in the ring, which contained the magic jewel that powered Agrabah's protection spell. He then uses it to cast a curse to make Agrabah disappear, "out of human reach".

=== In the Enchanted Forest ===
As the Nautilus is submerged into another realm, Nemo and Liam inform Hook that Gideon has taken the blood of the Kraken that was needed to return to Storybrooke, so Hook suggests that they hunt down the squid. At the same time, Jasmine and Aladdin search for Agrabah, when she discovers a ring in her pocket after she had wished to find Agrabah. They later continue the journey on boat, when they come across the Kraken, and are saved by Hook. It turned out that the compass from the Nautilus can lead them to a person whose heart is filled with revenge. This gives Hook an idea to help track down Jafar, who might still have the ability to help him return to Storybrooke. However, the Kraken also caused critical damage to the Nautilus, but Jasmine uses her second wish to send them to Jafar's pinpointed location, Hangman Island.

After they part ways with Nemo and Liam, Hook, Aladdin, and Jasmine encounters Ariel, who had a vase-like lamp that contains Jafar, who is now a genie. When Jasmine summons Jafar, it only ends up freeing him, since he found a way to break his genie curse while imprisoned, before going on to knock out the others with magic. Jafar tells Jasmine that he no longer wants anything from her, only vengeance on those responsible for his imprisonment. (Note: As depicted in the Once Upon a Time in Wonderland episode "And They Lived...") Jafar goes on to mock each of them, calling Aladdin "battle-broken" and "weeping". At Jasmine's insistence, he tells her what happened to her kingdom, but only because the answer amused him - Agrabah was trapped inside the ring that she just wished up. Jafar then mocks Jasmine's past failure and inability to save her people, before demanding that Jasmine give him the ring. Jasmine, now emboldened, discovers a way to save her kingdom, as she turned Jafar into a walking staff using the magic powder, much to Jafar's shock. Then, she kisses Aladdin, thus freeing him from his genie curse, and causing the entire kingdom of Agrabah to re-materialize from the ring. Afterwards, Ariel helps Hook find a way to communicate with Emma, by giving him a seashell that can allow him to call her across realms. Hook uses the seashell, and he's able to reach Emma successfully, vowing that he'll had never meant to leave her, and that he'll find a way to return to her.

=== In Storybrooke ===
In the present day, Emma tells David about Hook having killed Robert. David is upset over this and about Hook's reluctance to confess himself, but Emma tells David that he left on the Nautilus after they broke up over this issue, as witnessed by Leroy earlier. Later, Regina suggests to Snow and Emma that they enjoy ladies' night at a new bar called "Aesop's Tables," but a heartbroken Emma passes. At home, Emma accepts that Hook won't be coming back and gathers his things with Henry when she gets a phone call about a bar fight. As she arrives, Emma discovers that Regina and Snow tricked her into joining them. Regina encourages Emma to open up about her heartbreak while a drunk Snow challenges a group of Vikings to a knife-throwing contest. A crying Emma is met by the bar's owner, Aesop, who tells a heartbreaking story of an artist and his wife, then gives her a napkin to wipe her tears away. When Emma returns home, she makes to put away Hook's belongings, when she noticed a seashell calling out her name, discovering that it was Hook telling her that he'll return to her. After Emma loses the signal, she hears Aesop's voice and she looks up, only to discover that Aesop was actually Gideon, who needed Emma's tears in order to blackmail her, telling her that with her tears, he will be able to prevent Hook from using any portals to return to Storybrooke, unless she helps him kill the Black Fairy.

== Cultural references ==
Ariel's home Hangman's Island features a collection of corkscrews, forks, and more, similar to her collection under the sea.

Jasmine mentions Scheherazade from One Thousand and One Nights.

== Production ==
Rebecca Mader, Robert Carlyle, and Emile de Ravin are credited but do not appear in this episode.

== Reception ==
=== Reviews ===
- Christine Laskodi of TV Fantic gave the episode a positive review: 4.5 out of 5.0.
- Entertainment Weekly gave the episode a B.
