= Mother's Little Helpers =

Mother's Little Helpers or Mother's Little Helper may refer to:

- Nickname for the drug Diazepam (Valium)
- Cougars, Inc., developed under the title Mother's Little Helpers, a 2010 indie film
- "Mother's Little Helper", a 1966 Rolling Stones song
- "Mother's Little Helper" (Medium), a 2007 Medium episode
- "Mother's Little Helper" (Once Upon a Time), a 2017 episode of Once Upon a Time
- "Mother's Little Helper", a Casualty episode
- "Mother's Little Helpers" (Helstrom), a 2020 Helstrom episode

== See also ==
- "Brother's Little Helper", an episode of The Simpsons television series
- Santa's Little Helper, a fictional dog from The Simpsons
