= Page 23 =

- Once Upon a Time episode
- Episode no.: Season 6 Episode 14
- Directed by: Kate Woods
- Written by: David H. Goodman & Brigitte Hales
- Production code: 614
- Original air date: March 26, 2017

Guest appearances
- Sean Maguire as Robin of Locksley; Giles Matthey as Morpheus/Gideon; Rose McIver as Tinker Bell; Tony Perez as Prince Henry; Faran Tahir as Captain Nemo

Episode chronology
← Previous "Ill-Boding Patterns"	Next → "A Wondrous Place"
- Once Upon a Time season 6

"Page 23" is the fourteenth episode of the sixth season of the American fantasy drama series Once Upon a Time, which aired on March 26, 2017. In this episode, the Evil Queen and Regina prepare to face each other once and for all, while Emma learns the truth about what Hook did, which comes into play for Gideon as he takes advantage of this dilemma. In the past, the real reason behind the Evil Queen's search for Snow White's heart is revealed.

== Plot ==
=== Opening sequence ===
The Dark Palace from the first curse Enchanted Forest is featured.

=== Event chronology ===
- The Enchanted Forest events take place after "Lost Girl" and before "Souls of the Departed".
- The Storybrooke events take place after "Ill-Boding Patterns".

=== In the Characters' Past ===
In the pre-First Curse Enchanted Forest, Regina, during her reign as the Evil Queen, is still after Snow White's heart, and as usual, comes up empty-handed as Snow eludes her once again. The Evil Queen then gathers the villagers and tells them that she, not Snow White, cares about them. When Tinkerbell shows up to tell her why she did not pursue Robin Hood, Regina decides to scorn the fairy, but spares her and tells Tinkerbell not to meddle with her. This later leads to an argument between Regina and Prince Henry, who warns his daughter that revenge will never make her happy.

Later on, Henry, with help from Tinkerbell, leads Regina to a portal that was designed to lead Regina to Robin, but the Queen is still obsessed with revenge, as she takes Cupid's arrow, and uses dark magic to make it pinpoint the person she hates most instead. However, when she fires the arrow, it flies straight towards the fortress. Believing that Snow is there, Regina returns to discover that the arrow leads her to her mirror, which she shatters into pieces. Regina realizes it is herself she hates most.

=== In Storybrooke ===
In the present day, the Evil Queen brings Robin back with her to town, he wants to go to New York but the Evil Queen wants to return Robin back to his Wish Realm, so she first asks him to dig up an item in the woods. Regina and Zelena then visit Emma and Snow, where they learn that Hook proposed to Emma upon looking at the engagement ring, but when they learn that the Evil Queen has returned to her original form, Emma wants to put those plans on hold. In the woods, Robin's shovel hits the metal box, which contained the Fate's Shears of Destiny, which the Evil Queen wants to use not only to separate her fate from Regina's, but to destroy Regina and Storybrooke. The Evil Queen then shows up to take Henry's Author's Pen, so she could keep Henry from writing her out of existence or interfering with her coming showdown with Regina. Then, after Henry reveals that he only wanted to use the Pen to help move her towards redemption, The Evil Queen scoffs at the idea. The Evil Queen then gives Henry a note to deliver to Regina, before telling him that no matter what anyone says, she still loves him.

When Regina receives the message, she learns that the message came from Page 23 of the "Once Upon a Time" storybook that detailed the happy ending Regina never got, which Regina discovered that it all tied to Robin, who is being used as bait to lure her to the Evil Queen so she can kill her, even though Robin believes this plan will fail. Regina confronts her other half at the Mayor's office, but the Evil Queen tells Regina she's more interested in using the shears to destroy Regina rather than helping Robin. Regina dares the Evil Queen to use the Shears and the latter does, unveiling the ties of fate linking Regina to her evil half, which The Evil Queen severes with the Shears. This makes the Evil Queen completely independent of Regina, allowing the two to battle each other until Regina manages to overpower the Evil Queen, and binds her against a pillar on the wall. Then, Regina, after looking at the broken mirror and seeing how much she hated her evil self, displays the Evil Queen's heart to show her that she chooses to love over hate. Regina then transfers half of the Evil Queen's darkness into her heart, while transferring half of her light into the Evil Queen's heart, turning the two Reginas into bonding sisters who agree to bury the hatchet. The two agreed to send Robin back to his Wish Realm, and with help from Henry, he writes a new chapter and happy ending for the formerly Evil Queen by sending her off to a place to begin a fresh start.

Meanwhile, Hook arrives at the docks to say farewell to Nemo, and confides his secret about killing Emma's grandfather to Nemo. Nemo suggests that Hook either ask for forgiveness from Emma or keep the secret and learn to forgive himself. Ultimately, Hook decides to remove his memories through magic and burn them. When Emma sees him doing this, she is not upset to learn he killed her grandfather, since they have come too far for something like that to break them; however, she is upset that Hook chose to keep it from her, as they had earlier in the season decided to no longer keep secrets from one other, in order to build a more honest relationship. Reluctantly, Emma passes back the ring and calls off the wedding until Hook can learn to do that. Later, Snow congratulates Hook on the engagement, not knowing about what transpired earlier. Unfortunately, just as Hook changes his mind and is about to leave Nautilus to return to Emma, the submarine submerges without Nemo ordering it to do so. Hook and Nemo learn that Gideon had ordered the sub out of Storybrooke, in order to get Hook out of the way so he can kill Emma, leaving Hook and Nemo trapped as prisoners. A hurt Emma waits at home for Hook, and realizing he won't be returning, shuts off the lights.

=== In the Wish Realm ===
The Queen sends Robin back home after his many pleas to leave Storybrooke. Later, as the Queen wishes for a fresh start, she is sent to the Wish Realm, where she reunites with Robin in a local bar. True to the image on Page 23, a bond begins to blossom.

== Production ==
Josh Dallas, Robert Carlyle, and Emilie de Ravin are credited but do not appear in this episode. Hesham Hammoud, who plays the Crewman in this episode, also played Ghazi in the Once Upon a Time in Wonderland episode "Who's Alice".

=== Title ===
The title of this episode was revealed by Adam Horowitz via his Twitter account on November 30, 2016. The title of this episode is a reference to the alternate page XXIII of Henry's book, which represents another version of Regina and Robin's first meeting. It was created by Isaac Heller, and first appears in the Season 4 episode "Smash the Mirror".

== Reception ==
=== Reviews ===
- Christine Laskodi of TV Fantic gave the episode a positive review: 4.0 out of 5.0
- Entertainment Weekly gave the episode a C.
