= Labor of Love (Once Upon a Time) =

- Once Upon a Time episode
- Episode no.: Season 5 Episode 13
- Directed by: Billy Gierhart
- Written by: Andrew Chambliss; Dana Horgan
- Production code: 513
- Original air date: March 13, 2016

Guest appearances
- Emma Caulfield as the Blind Witch; Greg Germann as Hades; Bailee Madison as Young Snow White; Kacey Rohl as Megara; Victoria Smurfit as Cruella De Vil/Cruella Feinberg; Jonathan Whitesell as Hercules; Teach Grant as Dead Eye

Episode chronology
← Previous "Souls of the Departed"	Next → "Devil's Due"
- Once Upon a Time season 5

"Labor of Love" is the thirteenth episode of the fifth season of the American fantasy drama series Once Upon a Time, which aired on March 13, 2016.

In this episode, Snow is reunited with Hercules; and Henry and Cruella are reunited. In flashbacks, Hercules trains Snow.

== Plot ==
=== Opening sequence ===
The underworld cemetery makes an appearance in the red tinted forest.

=== Event chronology ===
The Enchanted Forest events take place after "Quite a Common Fairy" and before "Enter the Dragon". The Underworld events take place after "Souls of the Departed".

=== In the characters' past ===
In the early days of the Enchanted Forest, a young Snow White is asked to defend her kingdom from bandits who are working with the Evil Queen but flees into the forest, believing she cannot help them with her father away. After she falls into a hunting trap Snow is saved by Hercules, who is on a quest to complete the final part of his Twelve Labors, which is to hunt down Cerberus. He encourages Snow White not to give up, and he even offers to train her for battle, suggesting that she fight the bandits herself. When Snow faces the bandits, she foolishly drops her arrows, then loses her dignity when Hercules defends her. Using his past mistakes and learning from them, Hercules inspires her to try again, and she successfully aims at the bandits' weapons, prompting the bandits to leave the kingdom, and setting up her future as the bandit princess. Snow White thanks Hercules for helping her and says she will make a great Queen and Olympus will have a great hero like him and they kiss goodbye.

=== In the Underworld ===
Deep inside Hades' lair, an injured Hook awakens and notices a young woman who is also trapped with him in the chamber. As he struggles to move Hook convinces the young woman to run for help and asks for Emma. As they reach the exit, a three-headed hellhound creature, Cerberus, chases after the two. Above at the cemetery, Mary Margaret and David look at the gravestones of those who Mary Margaret felt she had failed as alluded in the flashback, But David is confident that they can protect Emma and tells Mary Margaret that she can be able to succeed. When she sees the tombstone of Hercules, David is surprised to learn that she knew the Demi-God, and believes that he has unfinished business with her, which gives them the idea to help him while seeking out Hook. Regina and Robin meet up with Emma and Henry. Regina tells Robin that she has maps at the Mayor's office and Henry and Robin head there but when Regina turns around Emma has taken off and calls for her. Emma notices fresh blood and traces the direction, but instead they find the young woman and she says she knows Killian. As soon as they hear the roar of Cerberus, Emma uses her magic to take them to the Underworld version of Mary Margaret's apartment. Later on at Granny's Diner, Emma and Regina are joined by Mary Margaret, and thanks to the Blind Witch, they find Hercules, who they hope he will complete his Twelve Labors before he can move on, being Cerberus.

At the Mayor's office, Henry breaks in to get the maps as Robin stands guard. Instead of finding the map, Henry sees Cruella, who explains to him that because he is now the Author, he can bring her back to life, and despite the fact that he broke the Quill, it’s still alive in the Underworld as it has unfinished business to write people's stories. She tells Henry if he helps her escape the Underworld, it will be as if she never died, and therefore, Emma’s soul will be pure again. Unfortunately when Robin asks Henry if he found the map as they leave the office, Henry lies to Robin that he didn’t find anything or anyone.

As they reached the tunnel with Cerberus waiting for them, Hercules starts to lose his courage in front of Emma, Mary Margaret and Regina. Hades then appears and tells the women that Cerberus was the creature responsible for killing Hercules (who happens to be Hades' nephew), then gives Emma Hook's bloodied hook as a gift. Back at the apartment, Mary Margaret believes its time for Hercules, who regretted fighting Cerberus alone, to fight the creature as a team. When Cerberus enters the apartment, everyone splits up, leaving Hercules, Mary Margaret, and the woman trapped inside the library. Hercules suddenly gives the woman his dagger, then grabs a pipe for himself, and Mary Margaret readies her arrows. The trio then use their weapons on Cerberus and successfully kill the creature. The woman faints and Hercules catches her, and when she comes to they introduce each other, as she revealed to Hercules her name is Megara, or as her friends called her, Meg.

As everyone meets back at Granny's Diner, they learn that it was their "unfinished business" for Hercules to rescue Meg from Cerberus, as he died during his fight with the creature and Meg later died after he failed. The crew takes them to the crossing, and Hercules and Meg ascend together to Olympus. As the clock ticks twice, Hades has decided that it's time for the outsiders to pay by punishing them. He arrives to see his prisoner Hook, and tells him that for each soul his friends help escape, one of them will have to stay forever. Hades forces Hook to decide which of his friends will pay for this by creating new tombstones for him to engrave with a chisel.

== Cultural references ==
Hercules receives medals for his Twelve Labors, and he is seen with eleven, meaning he has completed all of them except for killing Cerbeus (the unfinished business keeping him in the Underworld). Hercules talks extensively with Snow about his first Labor – killing the Nemean Lion. Each medal has unique artwork commemorating each of his Labors.

When Megaera introduces herself to Hercules, she tells him, "My name is Megaera or Meg as my friends like to call me," which is a reference to their Disney counterparts in the 1997 film Hercules.

== Production ==
Emilie de Ravin, Rebecca Mader and Robert Carlyle are credited but do not appear in this episode.

== Reception ==
The episode received good reviews in how they reimagined the Hercules angle and the structured storylines.

In a review from Rickey.org, Nick Roman said, "This just might have been the best Once Upon a Time so far this season, despite “Labor of Love” largely focusing on two people we’ve only just met. This episode had the perfect balance of well-paced drama, strong character arcs, and a solid twist or two to compel us to come back next week. This essentially recaptured that adventurous, yet emotionally grounded feeling of the first two seasons. To say I loved this would be one of the big understatements of the TV season so far."

Andrea Towers of Entertainment Weekly notes in her assessment of the review: "Once isn’t exactly a novice when it comes to turning fairytales on their heads, and rarely do they follow stories to the letter. But for those of you who tuned in looking for the classic Disney tale of Hercules, well...you got something slightly different.

Gwen Ihnat of The A.V. Club gave the episode an excellent review, giving it a B. In her recap, she points out: "Welcome back to the Underworld, where we will be freeing a few famous souls at a time. This week, we get adorable teenage Hercules and his love Meg, with, as with most efforts on OUaT, mixed results."

Christine Orlando of TV Fanatic gave the episode a 4.6 out of 5.
