= Quite a Common Fairy =

- Once Upon a Time episode
- Episode no.: Season 3 Episode 3
- Directed by: Alex Zakrzewski
- Written by: Jane Espenson
- Original air date: October 13, 2013

Guest appearances
- Robbie Kay as Peter Pan; Sarah Bolger as Aurora; Jamie Chung as Mulan; Sean Maguire as Robin Hood; Rose McIver as Tinker Bell; Keegan Connor Tracy as Blue Fairy

Episode chronology
← Previous "Lost Girl"	Next → "Nasty Habits"
- Once Upon a Time (season 3)

"Quite a Common Fairy" is the third episode of the third season of the American fantasy drama series Once Upon a Time, and the show's 47th episode overall.

This episode continues the core characters' search for Henry (Jared S. Gilmore), as Peter Pan (Robbie Kay) reveals to him the real reason he brought him to Neverland, while Regina (Lana Parrilla) discovers a familiar face from her past that wants to seek revenge on her after she attempted to help her show what true love is back in the Enchanted Forest. And in the Post-Curse Fairytale world, Neal finds a way to return to Neverland to save Emma Swan (Jennifer Morrison) and Henry, but needs the help of Robin Hood's (Sean Maguire) son, while Mulan (Jamie Chung) makes a personal decision.

The episode — written by Jane Espenson and first broadcast on October 13, 2013 — was watched by 7.53 million American viewers; and received mixed reviews from critics, despite most praising Mulan's storyline.

== Title card ==
The fairy Tinker Bell sprinkles pixie dust on the series' title in the Enchanted Forest.

== Plot ==
=== Event Chronology ===
The Enchanted Forest events take place after "The Doctor" and before "Labor of Love". The Neverland events take place after "Lost Girl".

=== In the Characters' Past ===
Having grown tired of taking magic lessons to the point of missing them, as well as feeling unloved by her husband and claiming that she feels like a prisoner, Regina is confronted by Rumplestiltskin, who is checking on her since she missed her lessons. He tells her that darkness is eating her up and won't stop until she is consumed and that she can't flee from her fate and that her rage is all she has. Upset, Regina stands on a balcony, slamming at the railing. It breaks, and Regina falls, just in time to be saved by a fairy named Tinker Bell who says she is there to give Regina a second chance. As Regina becomes friends with Tinker Bell over a meal and tells her of her frustration, Tinker Bell offers her a chance to find what she really needs in her life, real love. However, Tinker Bell's attempts to save Regina do not sit well with the Blue Fairy, who scolds Tinker Bell – who is supposed to be the Green Fairy – for her continual rule-breaking and tells her to stop helping Regina because of her evil nature and her association with Cora and the Dark One. Tinker Bell thinks this means Regina needs the most help, but The Blue Fairy won't have it; she declares that Tinker Bell must remain under supervision for the rest of her training. Unfortunately, Tinker Bell disobeys that order, and steals the pixie dust to help Regina.

Later that night, Tinker Bell brings along pixie dust as she and Regina fly off. Tinker Bell uses her dust to show Regina the way to her happy ending by chasing after it, and the trail leads them to a tavern, where they see a man inside with a lion tattoo, covered in pixie dust. Tinker Bell informs Regina that the man with the lion tattoo is her soulmate (his face is hidden from view). She encourages her to go in so she will finally be happy and let go of all her anger and sadness, then departs. Regina pulls open the door, but she begins to panic and runs off without meeting or seeing the man's face. Later on, Tinker Bell visits Regina to ask her how things went, prompting Regina to lash out and lie, saying that the man was awful and accusing Tinker Bell of being a horrible fairy. Hurt, Tinker Bell flies away, but is caught by the Blue Fairy. After Tinker Bell pleads for a second chance, the Blue Fairy informs her that this was her second chance: after what has happened she no longer believes in Tinker Bell. The Blue Fairy strips Tinker Bell of her wings, making her human and she falls to earth.

=== In Neverland ===
As the quintet continue their search for Henry, they noticed that the map has somehow changed as it appears that Peter Pan and The Lost Boys are not only one step ahead of them, but are now following them. This situation prompts Hook to seek out a person who can help them, Tinker Bell, who was a one-time ally of Peter Pan. However, Regina is against the idea because of their history. Later on, Regina drops her handkerchief, which is picked up by someone. Regina tries to persuade Emma Swan to combine their powers to defeat Pan, but Emma believes it to be too risky. As the group draws closer to Tinker Bell's home, Regina hangs back, leading Emma to question what Regina had done to Tinker Bell in the past, with Regina replying that she did what she always does. Emma leaves her to check out Tinker Bell's hideout. Later on Regina hears something from the plants, revealed to be Tinker Bell, who knocks Regina out by blowing poppy dust into her eyes. Moments later, the remaining members search Tinker Bell's lair and come up empty but discover Regina's handkerchief, now that they realized that Tinker Bell had been following them so she can exact revenge on Regina.

At another location, Regina discovers that she is now at the mercy of Tinker Bell, who has a knife laced with Dreamshade pointed at her. Tinker Bell tells Regina that she was responsible for losing her powers and for betraying her. Offering to make it easier for Tinker Bell to kill her, Regina pulls out her darkened heart and gives it to Tinker Bell, who angrily demands to know why Regina lied to her. Regina admits that she never went into the tavern because she was afraid that without the anger that was holding her down she would no longer be anything. Regina tells Tinker Bell that if she kills her she would be in the same position as Regina, choosing revenge over hope, blackening her own heart; but if instead she does not kill her and assists Regina in finding Henry, she'll be proving what a truly good fairy she is. Tinker Bell tells her she won't kill her but she won't help her either and gives back her heart. As the rest of the members reach the location and confront Tinker Bell, Regina comes out and tells them that Tinker Bell is human. They then persuade Tinker Bell they can help her and search for Henry at the same time, and she agrees to the deal. Later on, Tinker Bell tells Regina that she should admit that she also ruined the person she was supposed to meet if they were to meet again.

In between that scenario, Hook noticed that David is poisoned with the Dreamshade and that he should tell Mary Margaret, but David thinks that he can use the pixie dust to save himself. Hook guesses David has days, weeks at most to survive.

Meanwhile, in another part of the island, Peter Pan wakes Henry up for target practice, and uses Felix as a guinea pig by placing an apple on his head, instructing Henry to aim a poisoned arrow at it, stating that as long as Henry trusts himself, Felix won't be hurt. At the last second Henry turns the arrow on Pan, who captures it before it can hit him. Henry tells Pan that he is growing tired of being in Neverland, but Pan tells him he's been waiting for him even since before he was born because Henry is the only person who believes in magic, which is dying in other worlds because there is no belief. Henry can bring the magic back by becoming the new Savior. Henry notes that Emma is the Savior, but Pan says maybe having him made her so, as Henry is the rare product of light and dark (the lineage being Snow White and Rumplestiltskin as he is their grandson). He gives him something that will show Henry he is the one they've been waiting for. Henry tosses the paper aside, but moments later picks it up and discovers an exact portrait of himself.

=== In the Enchanted Forest ===
At Rumplestiltskin's castle, Neal looks through his father's magical items, hoping to find a portal, as he realizes that the only reason that Emma would be in Neverland is because Henry must be the boy Pan was looking for, and he is now trapped there. The rest of Robin Hood's group comes in, and Robin introduces them, including his young son Roland. The boy's appearance makes Neal remember how to get to Neverland. An argument ensues between Neal and Robin Hood, who wants to use Roland to summon the shadow. Robin explains that he has lost his wife and Roland is all he has now. Neal convinces Robin to go along with his plan after reminding him that, thanks to the Dark One, his wife was able to recover from her sickness and give birth to Roland in the first place. Reluctantly, Robin Hood agrees to let Roland call the shadow, and the two along with Mulan prepare for its arrival. Roland says "I believe," but nothing happens...then the window bursts open, and the shadow appears. Robin grabs Roland and holds on to him long enough for Neal to grab the shadow and the two fly out. The shadow drops Neal back into Neverland, where Felix welcomes him "home."

After Robin puts his son down to sleep, he thanks Mulan for her help. He invites her to be in the Merry Men, but she says there's someone she must talk to, inspired by Neal, who said that he should have told Emma he loved her long before. As Mulan goes home and sees Aurora, Mulan asks her if Phillip is there, but tells Aurora not to bother to fetch him as it is her she wants to talk to. But just as Mulan is about to tell Aurora about her feelings towards her, the princess tells Mulan that she's pregnant, stunning the warrior. Mulan suddenly changes the subject and says she's going to join Robin Hood's band. She leaves with tears in her eyes. When Mulan arrives at the site of the Merry Men and shakes Robin's hand another surprise is revealed: his wrist features the lion tattoo, meaning that Robin Hood was the person that Regina was supposed to meet back in the Enchanted Forest.

== Cultural references ==
As alluded in the opening sequence, Tinker Bell and her likeness was also used in the opening credits on another Disney-related program that also aired on ABC on Sunday Nights, The Wonderful World of Disney.

== Production ==
The decision by creators Adam Horowitz and Edward Kitsis to add an LGBT character or characters in the series were hinted in a June 12, 2013 interview with The Huffington Post, in which Kitsis stated that "We are absolutely open to that, and for us, it's a matter of the right time and the right story. It's something we discuss and we're open to, it's just not something we've done yet." Horowitz added to the statement: "And it's the same as with any love story -- we'd have to do it right and give it its due." As the airdate for the episode approached, Sarah Bolger and Jamie Chung posted on their Twitter accounts about how excited they were about the outcome.

== Reception ==
=== Ratings ===
The episode posted a 2.3/6 among 18-49s with 7.36 million viewers tuning in, which was down 12 percent from the previous episode, in part due to the competition from NBC's Sunday Night Football and Fox's broadcast of the 2013 ALCS Baseball Playoffs.

=== Critical reception ===
"Quite a Common Fairy" received mixed reviews from critics, with most of them praising Mulan's storyline but expressing dissatisfaction with change of setting and the continued flashbacks.

In a review from Entertainment Weekly, Hillary Busis quotes, "I have to level with you guys: Until about 8:55 p.m., I wasn't really feeling this episode... but by the time 9 o'clock was nigh, I had begun to think "Quite a Common Fairy" might be this year's first dud. And that's when we learned that Mulan was in love with Princess Aurora."

Amy Scales of Entertainment Outlook gave it 4.5 stars in its summary: "I think Once Upon a Time is ON FIRE this season and I hate the waiting, this episode continues to raise the bar on a stellar season that has me anxiously awaiting every Sunday."

Gwen Ihnat of The A.V. Club gave the episode a C rating, saying that "This show’s third season has completely ditched Storybrooke to become a straight-up adventure series in Neverland, but with each new episode it becomes clear that the fairyback structure is preventing the series from reaching its potential. OUAT has always used Lost as a template, and now its becoming even more of a mimic with most of the plot unfolding in the jungle and increasingly pointless flashbacks."

Despite negative reviews from several critics, Andrea Reiher of Zap2it called two lines from this episode one of the best TV lines of the week. The first, from Tinker Bell, was "Snow White. That's her name? Even I think that's a bit precious and mine's Tinker Bell;" the second, from Rumpelstiltskin, was "Roast swan. That's amusing. You'll get that later."
