= Good Form (Once Upon a Time) =

- Once Upon a Time episode
- Episode no.: Season 3 Episode 5
- Directed by: John Amiel
- Written by: Christine Boylan; Daniel T. Thomsen
- Original air date: October 27, 2013

Guest appearances
- Robbie Kay as Peter Pan; Parker Croft as Felix; Bernard Curry as Liam; Skyler Gisondo as Devin

Episode chronology
← Previous "Nasty Habits"	Next → "Ariel"
- Once Upon a Time (season 3)

"Good Form" is the fifth episode of the third season of the American fantasy drama series Once Upon a Time, and the show's 49th episode overall.

This episode follows the origins of Hook's (Colin O'Donoghue) early life as he and his brother, Captain Liam (Bernard Curry), sail off under orders of the King to find a powerful indigenous plant on an uncharted land that could help heal any injury. It could prove key to helping David (Josh Dallas) as the Dreamshade starts to consume him, and Hook sets off to find a sextant that could help the Storybrooke inhabitants escape Neverland.

The episode, written by Christine Boylan and Daniel T. Thomsen and first broadcast on October 27, 2013, received positive reviews from critics.

== Title card ==
Captain Hook's ship, The Jolly Roger, sails beyond the Enchanted Forest.

== Plot ==
=== In the Characters' Past ===
We are introduced to a young Killian Jones, a lieutenant about to join his brother, Captain Liam Jones, on board. As Liam arrives to welcome Killian, they discuss the mission the King has given him. He gifts Killian with a sextant that will guide them to a strange new land and will bring peace to the kingdom. The ship sets sail but a crewman spots a trio of enemy ships. This prompts Liam to deploy the “Pegasus,” and lower a giant sail that’s made from the feathers of a real Pegasus. As the horse could fly, so now can they, and they are able to leave the rival ships behind. Liam tells Killian to set a course for the second star to the right and straight on until morning.

The Jones Brothers land on an island that is revealed to be Neverland. Liam says the king wants a plant from here that can heal any injury. Suddenly, Peter Pan appears to greet the brothers and explains that he is the only person on this island. Liam shows him a sketch of the plant, which is revealed to be dreamshade. Pan warns them that it’s the deadliest plant on the island and that their King wants it to kill, not to heal. Liam doesn’t believe him but Killian begins to question if the King has sent them after a weapon. When they reach the plant, the brothers argue, as Killian believes Pan and Liam does not. Liam takes one and cuts it on his arm to prove to Killian that it is not deadly, but collapses as the poison invades his body. Pan appears, offering Killian a deal in exchange for saving Liam by showing him a spring that will heal him. He cautions Killian that all magic comes with a price. Killian says he is willing to do anything and brings the water to Liam, who is then healed.

As the vessel flies to return to its port, Liam apologizes to Killian and believes that they were tricked by the king to use the dreamshade to fuel a deadly war. Unfortunately, as soon as they are out of the league of Neverland, Liam suddenly collapses and dies in front of Killian, as the magical water can only work on persons within Neverland's league. After Liam's burial at sea, Killian, who is now Captain, is furious over what he sees as cowardly and immoral methods used by his own kingdom. He rallies the crew to join him in defying the King by burning the Pegasus' feathers and taking over the vessel, becoming pirates, and vowing never to sail to "that land" again.

=== In Neverland ===
At Peter Pan's camp, one of the Lost Boys, Devin, starts to bully Henry, prompting Henry to defend himself with a stick. Pan suggests that they use real swords. He tells Henry that Neverland runs on imagination and belief and so if he closes his eyes and believes he’s holding a real sword, the stick will indeed become one. When it does, Pan is impressed. Henry uses the sword to cut his opponent's stick and slashes him across the face. He quickly apologizes for giving him the scar, but Pan and the other Lost Boys cheer Henry on.

As they investigate Neal's cave, Emma discovers chalk markings, indicating that Neal was keeping track of the time he spent in Neverland. However, the marks stop abruptly and Emma thinks this is because he lost hope, as she did when she was in the foster system. This leads Emma to believe that Henry is about to lose hope as well. Mary Margaret suggests sending him a message to let him know his family is looking for him. Hook tells David that he knows a way to save him but David doesn’t want to get off course, believing it would be selfish. David later finds a military insignia on the ground, which Hook discovers came from his brother's satchel, but lies to him that Liam lost in a duel with Pan. He then spots a rock above them called Dead Man’s Peak, where he claims they could find a sextant that could help them to use Neal’s star chart to navigate off the island. Knowing that his hours are running out, David says goodbye to a perplexed Emma and Mary Margaret, asking Emma to tell Henry that his Grandpa loves him. He and Hook then go off on their quest for the sextant.

Emma, Mary Margaret, and Regina set a trap and capture Devin. Emma tells him that they can save all the Lost Boys but Devin refuses and tells them he is here because he does not want to go home. Regina decides that the only way to send Henry a message is to take out Devin's heart and control him as the messenger. Mary Margaret objects but Emma decides Regina's idea is the right choice. Controlled, Devin returns to camp and gives Henry the message. Henry sees them through a compact mirror but throws it away when Pan approaches.

Hook and David reach the pit and Hook tells David he'll go first. When he gets there, Peter Pan offers a reluctant Hook a deal to allow him to leave Neverland with Emma in return for Hook killing David. David reaches the top by himself and Pan disappears. Having heard everything, he takes out his sword but collapses as the dreamshade starts to spread to his heart. Hook fills up the canteen with the magic water and tells David that once he's drunk the water, he will not be able to leave Neverland because the water is the island's magic. David tells Hook that's a small price to pay; he realizes also that Hook lied to him about the sextant, knowing David would refuse any excursion to save his life.

The team are reunited and David tells them that Hook saved his life from a Lost Boy's poisoned arrow. They give Hook a toast and Emma thanks him. Hook then asks Emma for a kiss as thanks and Emma kisses him passionately though she tells him it was a one time thing. Pan returns to reveal to Hook that Neal is alive and Pan is going to make sure that Emma will see the type of person Hook really is. Elsewhere, Pan orders Felix to hang up the cage of an unconscious Neal on a tree next to another caged captive.

== Cultural references ==
Liam's directions to Neverland were "the second star to the right and straight on 'til morning" in the flashback, quoting Peter's directions to Wendy in the original 1953 Disney movie, which are a slight variation of the original directions given in J.M. Barrie's original novel, Peter Pan and Wendy (simply "second to the right, and straight on 'till morning").

Also, Regina tempts the Lost Boy with an Apollo candy bar, another reference to Lost.

After Hook kisses Emma she asks him to give her five minutes alone. He replies "As you wish", which is a reference to the 1987 movie The Princess Bride, where Wesley the Dread Pirate Roberts would say "As you wish" to Princess Buttercup. It actually meant "I love you".

== Critical reception ==
"Good Form" received positive reviews from critics.

In a review from Entertainment Weekly, Hillary Busis quotes, "First, let's get one thing out of the way: It happened. Emma and Hook finally engaged in The Smooch That Broke the Internet, generating enough electricity to power an entire CGI castle. Their wuv may or may not be twue. It may actually be closer to wust than wuv. Either way, one thing's for sure: It is hot. Hot enough to make a fire-breathing Maleficent blush. Hell, even hot enough to make me a lot less grumpy about an episode that indulged in one of TV's most annoying habits: A plot centered on one character not telling another character crucial information, for absolutely no reason beyond artificially ratcheting up dramatic tension. Bad form, Hook!"

Amy Ratcliffe of IGN called the episode "Great," adding that "With Charming and Hook spending so much time together, this episode easily could have devolved into hero and pirate jokes, but instead their relationship developed more. It was a refreshing change. Colin O'Donoghue does conflicted oh so perfectly, and he even had me fooled with his lies (and I know he's a liar). It turns out he and Josh Dallas do have an interesting dynamic when they're given decent dialogue. Go figure.."

Amy Scales of Entertainment Outlook gave it 4.5 stars: "Once Upon a Time fans were given a great treat with the story of how Killian Jones became a pirate and with another stellar performance by Robbie Kay as the manipulative Peter Pan. Good Form, quite literally!"

Gwen Ihnat of The A.V. Club gave the episode a B rating, saying that "Colin O’Donoghue does a commendable job of showing the procession from Killian Jones to Captain (almost) Hook: Betrayed by his king to retrieve a poison that kills his brother instead of a life-altering medicine, the rule-following Killian quickly transforms from a naval man into a rules-avoiding pirate. I get that the tossing of the rum into the water was the embracing of order, and throwing the coat into the water symbolized the absence of order, but man was slow-mo a cheesy way to pull that off."
