= Murder Most Foul (Once Upon a Time) =

- Once Upon a Time episode
- Episode no.: Season 6 Episode 12
- Directed by: Morgan Beggs
- Written by: Jerome Schwartz & Jane Espenson
- Production code: 612
- Original air date: March 12, 2017

Guest appearances
- Eion Bailey as August Booth; David Cubitt as Robert; Alan Dale as King George/Albert Spencer; Sean Maguire as Robin of Locksley; Raphael Sbarge as Archie Hopper; Wil Traval as Keith

Episode chronology
← Previous "Tougher Than the Rest"	Next → "Ill-Boding Patterns"
- Once Upon a Time season 6

"Murder Most Foul" is the twelfth episode of the sixth season of the American fantasy drama series Once Upon a Time, which aired on March 12, 2017. In this episode, The origins of the mystery surrounding the death of David's father is detailed in the flashback and the present day, while Hook grapples with proposing to Emma, and Regina starts to question her decision to bring the Wish Realm Robin back.

== Plot ==
=== Opening sequence ===
A ferris wheel from Pleasure Island is featured in the forest.

=== Event chronology ===
The Enchanted Forest events take place years before "White Out". The Storybrooke events take place after "Tougher Than the Rest".

=== In the characters' Past ===
In the decades before the first curse began, Ruth and Robert are the parents of newborn twins David and James, who require serious medical attention, or they will die. When Rumplestiltskin shows up and sees them, he offers them a deal that results in Rumplestiltskin taking James, as part of a deal he made earlier with King George in exchange for giving the parents the medicine for David.

Years later, King George wants to know the whereabouts of Prince James. The news has Robert, who has become an alcoholic, convinced that finding his birth son will solve their family's problems. He is then given a coin by David (the same one that The Evil Queen returned to David in Storybrooke) as a sign of good luck in finding James. The first stop Robert makes is to see Rumplestiltskin, who asks for a hair strand from him. Rumple then looks into a crystal ball and located James to a place called Pleasure Island. As Rumplestiltskin gives Robert a ticket to the Island to find James, he takes the hair strand from Robert. When Robert arrives at the amusement park-themed Pleasure Island, he is met by Pinocchio, who already has met James. Pinocchio leads Robert to his birth son and explained everything about his real life. As they attempt to escape, the barkers go after them and they are caught. Robert and James are then handed over to King George. Robert pleads with the King to let James return with him, but King George decides to issue an order to have Robert killed.

The moments of Robert's death are later revealed. It turns out that on the night that Robert was scheduled to be executed, a group of pirates raided the carriage and stole gold and other valuables, then killed the guards. Robert begged for mercy, saying that he wouldn't tell anyone, but he ended up being killed as well. Robert's murderer was Killian "Hook" Jones, who then ordered his men to take Robert's body and the carriage to the side of the road, so it would look like an accident.

=== In Storybrooke ===
The mystery surrounding Robert's murder is starting to have a strange effect on David to the point of seeing visions, as his father starts giving David cryptic messages to find out the truth. Meanwhile, Hook has scheduled a meeting with Archie on how to propose to Emma, but is worried about the reaction from David. When Hook later sees David, he noticed how obsessed David has become with finding out who murdered Robert, and now wants Hook to help him, albeit reluctantly from the pirate. Later on, David sneaks into Emma's place to look for items to help him. Hook agrees to play lookout when Emma approaches and he convinced her not to go in the place. David then finds a spell book and with Hook's help tries to follow the instructions, and it leads them to a clue which reveals that Robert may be on Pleasure Island.

David and Hook go to see August to ask about Pleasure Island, but a concerned August removed the pages that could include more information about Robert. By now, Hook is starting to worry about David seeking revenge, but David turns on Hook by handcuffing him to a bike rack and drives away. David returns to the asylum to confront the now-jailed Albert and challenges him to a fight to the death, only to have Hook intervene and place Albert back in jail. David is heartbroken to learn that Robert died because he tried to do the right thing, and after being convinced by Hook, David decides not to kill Albert, and afterwards apologized to Hook for making a terrible mistake. Hook in return asks David for Emma's hand in marriage and David gives Hook his blessing.

In between the events, the Wish Realm Robin is starting to adjust to life in Storybrooke and after a heated Zelena confronts Regina about the Wish Realm Robin not being able to have any rights to her daughter and leaves, Regina checks on Robin and finds him missing and a picture of Keith, who Robin thinks is the Sheriff of Nottingham from his realm. Regina stops Robin from killing Keith by making him disappear. Regina tells Robin about his real world counterpart having a son and daughter in this realm, and they agree to start fresh with a kiss. Later that night, Regina visits a now awake Snow, and tells her that bringing Robin back was not only a mistake, but she is now starting to question how he managed to survive coming to the portal. She even questions why her kiss with Robin felt like she was kissing paper. It turns out that the Wish Realm Robin had a real reason, and an ulterior motive, when he steals a box from Regina's vault that he sees as powerful.

Hook is later confronted by August, who tells him about the real reason he tore the pages out of the book and gives them to Hook, and when he sees the pages, he recognizes Robert and realizes that he was the person who had killed David's father. Hook then hides the pages from Emma and after she kisses him, looks at the engagement ring and finds himself worried about how to deal with this situation, knowing that the man he killed was Emma's grandfather.

== Production ==
Emilie de Ravin is credited but does not appear in this episode.

=== Title ===
The episode's title is a phrase from William Shakespeare's play Hamlet, where the Ghost of Prince Hamlet's father comments about his own death, saying "Murder most foul as in the best it is: But this most foul, strange and unnatural."

== Reception ==
=== Reviews ===
- Christine Laskodi of TV Fantic gave the episode a good review: 4.5 out of 5.0
- Entertainment Weekly gave the episode a B+.
