= Souls of the Departed =

- Once Upon a Time episode
- Episode no.: Season 5 Episode 12
- Directed by: Ralph Hemecker
- Written by: Edward Kitsis; Adam Horowitz
- Production code: 512
- Original air date: March 6, 2016

Guest appearances
- Lee Arenberg as Leroy/Grumpy/Dreamy; Emma Caulfield as the Blind Witch; Giancarlo Esposito as Magic Mirror/Sidney Glass; Greg Germann as Hades; Barbara Hershey as Cora/Queen of Hearts; Robbie A Kay as Malcolm/Peter Pan/Pied Piper; Tony Perez as Prince Henry/Henry Mills; Michael Raymond-James as Baelfire/Neal Cassidy

Episode chronology
← Previous "Swan Song"	Next → "Labor of Love"
- Once Upon a Time season 5

"Souls of the Departed" is the twelfth episode and midseason premiere of the fifth season of the American fantasy drama series Once Upon a Time, which aired on March 6, 2016. This episode also acts as the series' 100th.

In this episode, Emma, Snow, David, Regina, Henry, Robin, and Mr. Gold arrive in the Underworld. In flashbacks, the Evil Queen celebrates her birthday.

== Plot ==
=== Opening sequence ===
The fallen Storybrooke clock tower in the Underworld appears in the red-tinted forest.

=== Event chronology ===
The Enchanted Forest events take place after "Page 23" and some time before "Hat Trick". The Storybrooke events take place during "Swan Song", after Emma makes a deal with Mr. Gold and before the group's departure for the Underworld. The Underworld events take place after Hook's death in "Swan Song".

=== In the Characters' Past ===
In the Enchanted Forest, Prince Henry is trying to convince his daughter, Regina, still after Snow White's heart, to give up vengeance, but she is unable to let go of her anger. He turns to the Magic Mirror in desperation to speak with Cora, believing that the best way to force Regina to get over Snow White is to just help her complete her plot, which Prince Henry is not in favor of. Unknown to Prince Henry and Regina, Cora has managed to enter the realm of the Enchanted Forest through the mirror again. Later on, Prince Henry meets with Snow White in the woods. The real Prince Henry comes up behind her, and Snow realizes that the first Prince Henry was actually Cora, who rips out her heart while she is distracted. Cora takes Snow's heart to Regina as a birthday present, only to then learn that Snow's heart was switched out with that of a guard. It turned out that Prince Henry saved Snow White by switching the hearts. A furious Regina then shrinks her father and condemns him into the very box that was holding the heart. Regina confronts Cora and sends her mother back into the mirror and seals it forever. At the last minute Cora takes the box containing her husband so Regina will be truly alone.

=== In the Underworld ===
In what appears to be a dream, Emma wakes up in a car and is greeted by Neal, who tells her that he's just sending her a "long distance call from an old friend." He explains that he personally isn't in the Underworld, as it is only for those who have unfinished business, and that once they arrive, it's very hard to leave. Neal warns Emma not to go, but she refuses to listen to his advice and he knew she would and so he tells her he loves her and kisses her goodbye on the forehead and Emma wakes up. As Emma, Gold, Mary Margaret, David, Henry, Regina, and Robin Hood arrive in the Underworld in their quest to find Hook, the ensemble comes across a brimstone-hued version of Storybrooke. Gold tells them that every soul with unfinished business lives here until it is fulfilled, and since they have arrived that means they are ready to finish it as they were responsible, as Emma sees Cruella's car that serves as an example.

As they split up Regina and Robin are being followed by a resident (the person that Regina choked back in the Enchanted Forest), who leads them to Cora, who is the mayor of the Underworld Storybrooke. Cora offers Regina a way out, telling her she has one hour to leave on the ferry with Henry and Robin. She then takes Regina to a ledge over the Phlegethon, the River of Fire. She threatens to send Regina's father to a worse place if Regina does not comply, and she uses her messenger as an example by sending him off into the flames. Around the same time, Mary Margaret enters an Underworld version of Granny's and is recognized by the Blind Witch by her smell, and is then encountered by David wearing different clothes and proceeds to kiss her, as she realizes it's James, who is the "Sheriff" in this world. Gold goes to the Underworld version of his pawn shop and encounters his father Malcolm, whose soul must live as Peter Pan. Knowing already what Gold wants, Pan is willing to make a deal with no strings attached. However, he urges Gold to leave the Underworld, telling him that the others aren't his real friends, but Gold ignores his plea, accepting some sort of potion. Pan ominously adds that he himself would be able to leave, if only he could trade places with a living soul, although Gold refuses this. As everyone meets up again, Regina tells the others about Cora's warning, while Gold gives Emma the potion he obtained, which is from DunBroch, and can be used to summon the dead by pouring it over someone's grave. Gold explains it can be used to summon Hook and ask him where he is, but will not join them as he has decided that he is returning to Storybrooke.

The group travels to the site of Hook's grave (everyone in the underworld has a grave site) and Emma pours the ale of Seonaidh potion (Seonaidh is a Celtic water spirit from the Isle of Lewis) on the ground but lacks the power to bring him back, although they get a glimpse of an injured Hook before the potion wears off. Regina uses the potion and finds the soul of her father Prince Henry. Prince Henry tells Regina she has come too far to betray her friends now and tells her she must stay. Regina races to the banishment site with Henry as Cora attempts to banish the elder Henry, only to see the flames die down and a pathway to heaven open up. Since Regina has chosen to stay, remain a hero, and is no longer under the influence of her mother, Prince Henry's unfinished business is resolved. With his soul at peace, he is accepted into "a better place," and departs the Underworld after saying goodbye to Regina and Henry, who meets his namesake for the first time. The heroes realize they could potentially rescue all the souls here, and continue their quest to find Hook with this in mind. Cora meets with the ruler of the Underworld, Hades, who wishes the heroes gone (the clock on the broken tower will tick each time a soul leaves the Underworld), and punishes Cora for her failure with an eternity as a miller's daughter once again.

== Production notes ==
This episode would become the final one that was produced by Scott Nimerfro, who died on April 17, 2016, due to his angiosarcoma diagnosis.

== Reception ==
The episode received positive reviews, but noted that there are areas the producers could make improvements on.

In a review from Rickey.org, Nick Roman said, "“Souls of the Departed” is a story of redemption, and perhaps Season 5B could be similarly redemptive to any OUAT fans who weren't thrilled with the direction Season 5A took. I suppose we'll see. Either way, I'm in for the ride."

Andrea Towers of Entertainment Weekly notes in her assessment of the review: "Once Upon a Time has taken us pretty much everywhere in and out of fairy tale lore over the past five years: Storybrooke, the Enchanted Forest, Arendelle, Neverland. Tonight, with a return marking the show's midseason premiere, as well as its landmark 100th episode, Once gave us something old (daddy issues), something new (the Underworld), something borrowed (a potion) and something blue (that classic Hades hair)," but later sums up the entire episode: "I know we're going to be dealing with a lot of returning cast in the coming weeks, but admittedly, I was a wee bit let down by the fact this was touted as Once's big reunion episode, and the only significant people we saw from the past were Neal, Cora, and Pan. What I am happy about, though, is the prospect that Regina may end up being wholly important to this Underworld story line. Maybe she'll finally get an arc that's more than just waffling between good and evil. More importantly, it seems like everyone in the Underworld is either in cahoots with Hades or being manipulated by him in some way. Both Pan and Cora were keen on persuading their still-living significant family members, with Cora asking Regina to leave and Pan asking Rumple to save him. I'm interested in seeing exactly what's going on in this little corner of hell and exactly how Once is going to wade through this new road of storytelling.

Amy Ratcliffe of IGN said of the episode, "The return of Once Upon a Time served as set up for the final half of Season 5. They used the Underworld to bring back a ton of characters for quick check-ins, but Neal and Henry were the only ones who really strongly impacted the story and the Storybrooke team. Emotions fell flat across the board otherwise, except for the moment where Emma briefly saw Hook. They do have a compelling enough reason to stay in the Underworld -- though why Snow and Charming would spend so much time away from their newborn confuses me -- but overall, the episode was all about getting the board ready." Ratcliffe gave the episode a 7.0 rating out of 10.

Gwen Ihnat of The A.V. Club gave the episode an excellent review, giving it a B. In her recap, she points out: "With “Souls Of The Departed” Once Upon a Time, believe it or not, has just crossed a key threshold: 100 episodes. For all this show's inanities and love of catchphrases and gaping plot holes where logic should exist, there's clearly something very compelling about Storybrooke and its residents that resonates with viewers. In my own home, it's a decent family watch, that the kids find intriguing and even occasionally scary enough not to be lame, and the adults in the house can still take an interest. And the show still finds surprising mileage out of turning fairy tale tropes on their ear, or offering different sides of characters we think we know well."

Christine Orlando of TV Fanatic gave the episode a 4.2 out of 5.
