= Lost Girl (Once Upon a Time) =

- Once Upon a Time episode
- Episode no.: Season 3 Episode 2
- Directed by: Ron Underwood
- Written by: Andrew Chambliss; Kalinda Vazquez
- Original air date: October 6, 2013

Guest appearances
- Robbie Kay as Peter Pan; Giancarlo Esposito as The Magic Mirror; Robert Mann as Peasant #1

Episode chronology
← Previous "The Heart of the Truest Believer"	Next → "Quite a Common Fairy"
- Once Upon a Time (season 3)

"Lost Girl" is the second episode of the third season of the American fantasy drama series Once Upon a Time, and the show's 46th episode overall. It was first broadcast on October 6, 2013. This episode features the core characters continuing to search for Henry (Jared S. Gilmore).

Peter Pan (Robbie Kay) presents Emma Swan (Jennifer Morrison) with a map of Henry's (Jared S. Gilmore) location, though it can only be successfully used if Emma embraces her true identity. Meanwhile, Mr. Gold (Robert Carlyle) gets some startling advice; and back in fairy-tale land, the Evil Queen (Lana Parrilla) has a tempting offer for Snow White (Ginnifer Goodwin).

The episode—written by Andrew Chambliss and Kalinda Vazquez—received mixed reviews from critics, and was watched by 8.00 million people, achieving a 2.6/7 rating in 18–49 adult viewers.

== Title card ==
The Sword in the Stone stands in the Enchanted Forest.

== Plot ==
=== In the characters' past ===
After Snow White is woken up by Prince Charming and vows to take back the kingdom, the Evil Queen is tipped off by the magic mirror as to where Snow White is, and appears in the village to interrupt their plans to overthrow her. She offers an ultimatum, that Snow renounces the kingdom to her, or she will kill the people closest to her, and makes her point by choking a villager, but without killing him. Against the wishes of Charming, Snow already has an answer, leading the Prince to make a deal with Rumplestiltskin, who tells him of a legend that can be found in the Camelot realm. As they reach the destination, the two discover a sword in the stone–Excalibur. After Charming failed in his attempt to pull it, he convinces Snow to do it and she succeeds. When they return to the village, they're ready for Regina, as Snow tells her that she may be a queen, but she will not let her rule her people. Regina tries to kill Grumpy by choking him, but Snow succeeds in saving him and uses the sword to strike Regina's face. As Regina sees the scar, she warns Snow that she will meet her on the battlefield.

Hours later, Snow calls out Rumplestiltskin to ask him about Excalibur, and is willing to make a deal. As Rumplestiltskin appears, he tells her the sword is a fake–the real sword is still in Camelot–and it was Charming's idea to have her run through the sword in the stone routine. He takes her mother's necklace as payment for wasting his time. Snow returns to the campout to talk to Charming, who told her that the sword was to make her believe that she can stand up to Regina and it was all her doing without any magic. The two kiss and make up.

=== In Neverland ===
While searching for Henry, the quintet of Emma Swan, Hook, Mary Margaret, David, and Regina find themselves exhausted from hiking in the island, especially now that the island has changed a lot since Hook left. But later that night, Emma hears something and investigates, and to her surprise discovers Peter Pan, who is anxious to meet the "Savior." Emma is aware of him having Henry, but Pan has something else in mind for Emma, as he tells her that she can get her son back, but in order to do that she must follow the directions on a map that he gives her. Emma notices that the map is blank, but Pan tells her that she is the only one that can see it, and in order to do that, she has to realize what her true identity is. Pan disappears before Emma asks him more questions. As Emma tries to study the map by remembering her past, Regina looks it and casts a spell to locate Pan (since Pan was the owner of the map). Unfortunately, the directions that was to lead them to Pan was a trap, as the quintet are surrounded by The Lost Boys after Pan reminds Emma that she broke the rules (allowing Regina to cast a spell on the map), which resulted in a battle that left David slightly speared from a poisonous substance called Dreamshade, while Emma becomes spooked by the fear she saw in a Lost Boy's eyes whilst she was fighting him. Mary Margaret sees this exchange, and Emma tells her that she saw herself in the boy: it was her despair from her past as an orphan growing up without her parents. At that point the map finally reveals itself to Emma, which contains directions to a spot where Pan has placed Henry. As the team prepare to continue the search, Pan appears to Emma and compliments her for unlocking the map by admitting who she really was (an Orphan) but warns her that by the time she finds Henry, he won’t want to leave. He taunts her with this message: "You won't just feel like an orphan, you'll be one." As for David, he discovers that he has been poisoned by the Dreamshade, and decides to conceal it from the others.

Meanwhile, Rumplestiltskin summons up his own shadow in an effort to bury his dagger so no one else would find it, including him. He gets a visit from an image of Belle (which he conjured up, as she was still back in Storybrooke), who reminds him that he can find Henry without resorting to becoming "The Dark One" and the only way to let go of the past is letting go of the doll (which was made by Rumple's father) that Felix gave him, and he does by throwing it over the cliff. However, the doll returns to Rumple and even his powers can't destroy it, so Rumple decides to place it in his pocket.

== Cultural references ==
A Star Wars allusion is noticed by Regina's use of a telekinetic chokehold; Darth Vader used a similar chokehold, as did several expanded universe Sith Lords.

Emma references the Disney film by mentioning "waxed moustache... and a perm" when talking to Hook.

When Hook threatens the Hooded Lost Boy, Felix, he makes mention of what he did to Rufio (the Lost Boy left in charge during Peter Pan's absence in the 1991 film Hook) and how his fate will be much worse.

== Reception ==
=== Ratings ===
The episode fared successfully in ratings, achieving 8.00 million viewers, down only 0.52 viewers from the premiere episode. It became the day's top drama in Adults 18-49, scoring a 2.6/7, retaining 100% of the premiere's adult rating. The episode also ranked as the top-rated entertainment program in its hour with key women, and was the most social broadcast telecast of the evening.

=== Critical reception ===
"Lost Girl" received mixed reviews from critics.

In a review from Entertainment Weekly, Hillary Busis quotes, "Uh oh, dearies – we've reached the part in our story when everyone is being afflicted by crippling self-doubt. (Or, in Emma's case, the part where she... continues to be afflicted by crippling self-doubt.) It's a necessary step along any hero's journey. Unfortunately, it's not exactly the most scintillating subject in Once's repertoire. At least Rumbelle supporters and Captain Swan crew members each got a little something to snack on; the rest of us will just have to hope things get more exciting when Tinkerbell flits into our lives next week."

Amy Ratcliffe of IGN gave the episode a score of 6.5 out of 10; saying that "Though this episode wasn't bad, it wasn't bold. It was sleepy and comfortable, and it's too early in the season to be pulling on the plot-Snuggie. Let's hope it takes an adventurous turn next week."

Gwen Ihnat of The A.V. Club gave the episode a C− rating, saying that after seeing the storyline and pointing out that "It's criminal that most of our valuable Robert Carlyle screen time this episode is wasted on a vision and a doll." Ihnat noted that "Actually, this whole episode is moot."
