= Nasty Habits (Once Upon a Time) =

- Once Upon a Time episode
- Episode no.: Season 3 Episode 4
- Directed by: David Boyd
- Written by: David H. Goodman; Robert Hull
- Original air date: October 20, 2013

Guest appearances
- Robbie Kay as Peter Pan; Rose McIver as Tinker Bell

Episode chronology
← Previous "Quite a Common Fairy"	Next → "Good Form"
- Once Upon a Time (season 3)

"Nasty Habits" is the fourth episode of the third season of the American fantasy drama series Once Upon a Time, and the show's 48th episode overall.

This episode follows Mr. Gold's (Robert Carlyle) vow to redeem himself as he and Neal (Michael Raymond-James) are reunited in Neverland to search for Henry (Jared S. Gilmore), but Peter Pan (Robbie Kay) has a secret that could unravel the union, which dates back to their first encounter in The Enchanted Forest, while Emma Swan (Jennifer Morrison) encounters a clue from Neal's past that could give everyone involved a possible escape plan, but her feelings about losing Neal are affecting her emotionally.

The episode — written by David H. Goodman and Robert Hull and first broadcast on October 20, 2013 — was given mixed to positive reviews from critics, who commented on the angle involving the relationship between Rumplestiltskin and Neal/Baelfire; and was watched by 7.05 million American viewers.

== Title card ==
Henry dances wildly around an open campfire in the Enchanted Forest.

== Plot ==
=== In the Characters' Past ===
In the Enchanted Forest, Rumpelstiltskin comes home with a gift, which is a knife for Baelfire, which belonged to one of his victims. Baelfire does not want gifts; he wants to leave, go out, and have friends. Unfortunately, Rumpelstiltskin insists he cannot leave their house for his own safety since he is now the anointed "Dark One" before he roams off. But hours later Rumpelstiltskin returns home and discovers Baelfire missing. He tracks him to a village, where the villagers explain that their children are missing as well, lured out of their beds by a Pied Piper in the night. This gives Rumpelstiltskin a plan to confront the individual as he waits in the night until he hears the piper's call and moments later witnesses children climbing out windows and following the music. Rumpelstiltskin then discovers a group of children masked and costumed, dancing wildly around a fire.

He then tries to find Baelfire amongst the children, and confronts the Pied Piper, who is revealed to be Peter Pan, an old acquaintance of Rumplestiltskin's. After saying it has been a long time, Pan explains that only boys who feel unloved can hear his pipe, which is why Rumplestiltskin can hear him. Pan dares Rumplestiltskin to ask Baelfire if he wants to go back home with him or stay with Pan, stating that Rumple is afraid of what his son's answer might be. But Rumplestiltskin finds Baelfire, and uses his magic to take him back to their home. Rumplestiltskin tries to explain that Pan wanted to hurt him, as Rumplestiltskin has known Pan since he was a boy and that he betrayed him. Baelfire reveals Pan told him about the deal, that if he had been asked to go home, he would have. However his father didn't ask.

=== In Neverland ===
In the hours upon his return to Neverland, Neal finds himself a prisoner of Felix, but somehow manages to free himself from the bindings and escapes after knocking Felix out. Around the same time at another location, Gold continues to work his magic, when the image of Belle appears to him again, but to warn him that if he is planning to save Henry, it will mean his death. But Gold says things are different now and that he has nothing to live for saying that the only way he can redeem himself to his dead son is by saving his grandson. Hours later, Gold goes through the woods and knocks out two Lost Boys with magic, then picks up their weapons and almost attacks the person racing through the jungle behind him, only to discover that the person he tried to attack is his own son, Neal. As the two have their short reunion, Gold tells Neal that he doesn't think anyone else has the stomach for what must be done, but Neal tells him there is another way, so they go to the beach, and Neal picks up a shell, blowing into it and it summons forth a giant squid. Neal then takes his spear and throws it, reeling in the poisoned beast. Neal explains that ink from the squid can immobilize magical creatures.

Meanwhile, at another part of the island, Tinker Bell helps the quintet prepare their plan of attack, but then she discovers that there is no exit plan, adding that no one ever leaves Neverland without Pan's approval. She shows them the watch she took off Tamara's body as proof, and tells them of Greg's body in the jungle (much to Regina's satisfaction). Hook then leads his gang through the jungle, consulting David again about telling Mary Margaret that he has been poisoned, but continues to avoid telling her. Hook leads them to a secret cave, which has writing on the wall that Emma Swan immediately recognizes as Neal's childhood home. As Emma tries to read Neal's drawings and writing for a clue that would be useful in the search, she realizes that when Neal was Baelfire, he used a coconut to create a map of stars when lit with a candle. Hook explains that, although there is a map, it is in code and only Neal can read it. This leads to Emma having a breakdown, saying she never stopped loving Neal, and running into the woods. These series of events is also affecting Mary Margaret, who is upset that she cannot comfort her own daughter, because if David were to die, she wouldn't know how to survive, but David tries to tell Mary Margaret that she would have to be strong and move on but she insists nothing will ever happen to him while she's around.

Unfortunately, it appears that the news of Gold and Neal's reunion has reached Peter Pan's camp, where Pan notices Henry is the only one not dancing around the fire and celebrating, and thinks maybe a song will get him to dance. However, Henry can't hear anything. All of a sudden a Lost Boy comes back to inform Pan that Neal and Rumplestiltskin are now together. Later on, Gold arrives at the camp, while Neal sneaks up with a bow and arrow. As expected, Pan sees Neal, who shoots an arrow which is immediately caught by Pan. However, Neal, having know Pan would catch the arrow before the tip reached him, coated the arrow’s shaft with the ink, and he is immobilized. However, Pan tells Neal about the prophecy, claiming Gold is there to murder Henry. Gold and Neal get away with Henry, who sleeps under a spell. Neal demands Gold tell him about the prophecy, and he says that a boy would help Gold reunite with Neal, but would also be Gold's undoing. He admits that before he knew it was Henry, he was planning to kill the boy. Gold asks Neal how to win his trust, and Neal demands that he wants the dagger, but Gold tells Neal his shadow hid it, and he doesn't know where it is. Unfortunately, even as Gold tries to explain that being with Neal and getting his redemption would lead to a happy ending, Neal still doesn't believe he won't turn. Neal then takes his hand and puts the ink on Gold's palm, immobilizing him. He picks up Henry and goes to reunite with his family, insisting they are safer without Gold. After Neal takes off, the spell that was placed on Gold wears off and looks for his son. The imaginary Belle is back to comfort him and tells Gold that he has something to live for now that Neal is alive, knowing because he has something left, it has brought back his sense of self-preservation, and when Belle asks him if habits can be broken, he sends her away.

As Neal tracks Emma through the woods with a sleeping Henry, he is found by Pan and The Lost Boys, who recapture Henry and take him away. As Pan laughs about the "game," Neal says he made it off the island once when he was Baelfire, but Pan questions how he left in the first place without permission and Neal is taken prisoner by Pan. Hours later, Henry awakes at the fire, and Pan tells him he fell asleep. Henry seems to remember that he dreamed about seeing his father (Neal), but he continues to believe that he is still dead. Pan says Neverland used to be a place where dreams came to life, and Henry can bring that magic back. Pan plays his pipe, and Henry starts to dance under Pan's spell (believing that he has lost his parents causes him to now fit the criteria of a lost boy).

== Cultural references ==
Disney's use of The Pied Piper concept was first used in a 1933 Silly Symphony short. Other allusions included elements of the Darling Family from "Peter Pan", which can be found in the drawing in Neal's cave, along with a nod to Aladdin which hints to how Neal managed to escape Neverland and in The Little Mermaid when Neal used a sea shell to lure a large squid, while a pair of Lost allusions has Tinkerbell holding up a watch that stopped at 8:15 and Rumplestiltskin yelling out for Baelfire, echoing Michael's crying out for his son on the aforementioned series.

== Reception ==
=== Ratings ===
The episode scored a 2.1/5 among 18-49s with only 7.05 million viewers tuning in, down four tenths from the previous airing.

=== Critical reception ===
"Nasty Habits" received positive reviews from critics, who were impressed with the angle involving the relationship between Rumplestiltskin and Neal/Baelfire.

In a review from Entertainment Weekly, Hillary Busis quotes, "Although tonight's Once featured plenty of thumping music, rowdy dancing, and barbaric yawps, the episode's plot wasn't nearly as driving and insistent as the Lost Boys' delirious bacchanals. Instead, "Nasty Habits" focused more on character than incident—namely, Rumpelstiltskin's ongoing struggle to redeem himself, and his continually fraught relationship with his own lost-and-found son."

Amy Ratcliffe of IGN was impressed with the Neal/Rumplestiltskin storyline, adding that "Michael Raymond-James has taken Neal in an interesting direction over the past season, and any time he gets to be on screen with Robert Carlyle it's good for everyone."

Amy Scales of Entertainment Outlook gave it 5 stars: "Once Upon a Time was on fire tonight and the show is as good now as it has ever been. Nasty Habits was an hour so jam-packed with revelations that my head is still spinning. Squids, magic flutes, long overdue confrontations and the complete knowledge that this is most certainly a game and Pan is most certainly the one in charge."

Gwen Ihnat of The A.V. Club gave the episode a C rating, saying that "Remember those “If you love someone, set them free. If they come back they're yours; if they don't they never were” posters from the 1970s? Not to inflict bad wall art on anyone, but our OUAT characters could learn a thing or two from that old cliché."
