= Mother's Little Helper (Once Upon a Time) =

- Once Upon a Time episode
- Episode no.: Season 6 Episode 16
- Directed by: Billy Gierhart
- Story by: Edward Kitsis; Adam Horowitz
- Teleplay by: Paul Karp
- Production code: 616
- Original air date: April 9, 2017

Guest appearances
- Patrick Fischler as the Author/Isaac; Giles Matthey as Morpheus/Gideon; Charles Mesure as Blackbeard; Jaime Murray as Black Fairy; Grayson Gabriel as Roderick; Anton Starkman as Young Gideon

Episode chronology
← Previous "A Wondrous Place"	Next → "Awake"
- Once Upon a Time season 6

"Mother's Little Helper" is the sixteenth episode of the sixth season of the American fantasy drama series Once Upon a Time, which aired on April 9, 2017. In this episode, Gideon's past with the Black Fairy and his vengeance towards his grandmother is revealed, as Gideon blackmails Emma into defeating the Black Fairy in order to return Hook back to Storybrooke. Meanwhile, Hook teams up with Blackbeard to find a way to return, only to end up back in Neverland, whilst Regina turns to an imprisoned Isaac when Henry's powers as the Author goes awry.

== Plot ==
=== Opening sequence ===
The spider-infested pillars from the lakeside mansion are seen in the forest.

=== Event chronology ===
The Dark Realm events involving Gideon take place after "Changelings" and before "Wish You Were Here," while the Storybrooke events leading up to Gideon's backstory and Hook's adventures in the present day Enchanted Forest take place after "A Wondrous Place" and Hook's return to Neverland take place after "Save Henry."

=== In the characters' past ===
In the Dark Realm, 28 years ago in that realm's past, the Black Fairy has received the baby Gideon, who she just stole from the Blue Fairy, and she places the child with one of the child laborers, ordering her to raise the child as if he were the Black Fairy's. As the years pass, a young Gideon is now a prisoner and befriends another boy, Roderick. Gideon vows to protect his friend, but when he lashes out at the Black Fairy, she punishes Roderick instead as a way to torment her grandson.

On Gideon's 28th birthday, the Black Fairy tells her grandson (whom she calls her "son") how proud she is of him, when she noticed one of keys is missing, so she sends Gideon to go after the person responsible. When Gideon discovers that Roderick (who is still a slave) was the person who stole the key, Roderick convinces Gideon to become a hero by defeating the Black Fairy, and tells him that his grandmother is trying to harvest more magic dust after using up the last one (which was used for the first Dark Curse). Gideon apologized to Roderick for what happened when they were young and offered his aid. Roderick then tells Gideon that he needed the power of The Savior (Emma), which requires a magical orb in order to reach her.

When Gideon and Roderick find the orb and is ready to contact Emma, the Black Fairy appears. It turns out she had it all set up to test Gideon. When Gideon decided to defend himself however, the Black Fairy responded by turning Roderick into a bug then killing him. She then revealed that she was after Emma all along. She takes Gideon's heart and orders him to find and kill Emma, then bring the Hrunting sword back to her, which will free her from the Dark Realm.

=== In the Enchanted Forest and Neverland ===
At a pub, Hook comes across Blackbeard and the two make a deal, with Hook needing a magic bean and Blackbeard needing a ship, but this one is done over a game of cards, only for Hook to lose to his adversary. When they walked over to the dock, the Jolly Roger is nowhere to be found as it is in another realm, allowing Hook to reveal he meant to lose as Blackbeard had six aces in his deck, knowing he would be returning to Storybrooke either way. Blackbeard reluctantly hands over a bean so they could travel together. However, the portal sends the pirates to a place that Hook is very familiar with: Neverland, as he cannot return home to Emma. The two pirates encounter several Lost Boys who stayed behind in Neverland the last time Hook was there and remains loyal to Peter Pan, and they chase after them. Hook and Blackbeard make to the shoreline but when they reach and see a boat Blackbeard ends the truce by knocking Hook out and escaping with the boat.

=== In Storybrooke ===
Gideon tells Emma that he needs her help to defeat the Black Fairy and as long as he has the napkin with her tears, Hook will not return to her. Emma and Snow then visit Gold and Belle at the Pawn Shop, where despite a plea from Gold and Belle to spare Gideon's life and Emma's doubts, they do come to a truce that Emma should partner up with Gideon, as Gold tells Emma about the Black Fairy and what she is capable of as she is also Gold's mother.

Later that night at the clock tower, Emma meets with Gideon and agrees to help, on the condition that they exchange the spell to bring Hook back and Hrunting. Gideon then brings Emma through a door that can serve as a portal for Hook to return through. However, just moments before the spell is activated a giant spider comes through the portal and they run for cover, with Gideon apologizing to Emma for trying to kill her. As their attempts to escape are blocked by spiderwebs, Gideon pushes Emma into one and he takes the sword from her, allowing Gideon to disappear while Emma uses her magic to fight off the spiderwebs until Gold appears and helps Emma destroy the spider, but at that point Gideon has escaped.

Hours later, Emma and Snow confront Gold and Belle, but Emma is not convinced about Gideon being saved, prompting Gold to threaten Emma if she endangers Gideon, and as Emma and Snow leave, Gold tells Belle that he still has faith in Gideon. Meanwhile, back at the clock tower, Gideon discovers that the portal opened for a brief moment, allowing the Black Fairy to enter Storybrooke. She is now proud of her "son" and is ready to kill Emma.

In-between the events, Regina is attempting to reverse the sleeping curse with help from Henry. When he starts taking notes on what items Regina needed, he starts writing in a possession-like state before he passes out and when he comes to, Henry has no idea what happen to him. They then pay a visit to Isaac, who is now locked up at Storybrooke General Hospital. As they demand Isaac to tell them about why Henry is starting to be possessed, Isaac refuses to tell unless he is given a vehicle, a permanent leave from Storybrooke, and tickets to see Hamilton. When they refuse, Regina and Henry leave, only to have Isaac tell the two that as long as Henry is possessed by the author's powers, they'll only become worse. He agrees to tell them why on the condition that he's freed from his cell. Hours later at the city limits, Regina and Henry give Isaac a car that will allow him to leave town. As part of his agreement, Isaac tells them to look at the "Once Upon a Time" book, and when Henry opens the pages, he discovers that they're blank because it will soon detail a description of the final battle, the end of Emma's story.

== Cultural references ==
- Emma calls the spider Charlotte, in reference to Charlotte's Web.
- The license plate of the van reads “WED 1901”, a reference to the birth of Walt Disney.

== Production Notes ==
Josh Dallas and Rebecca Mader are credited but do not appear in this episode.

== Reception ==
=== Reviews ===
- Christine Laskodi of TV Fantic gave the episode a positive review: 4.7 out of 5.0
- Entertainment Weekly gave the episode a B−.
