= Ariel (Once Upon a Time) =

- Once Upon a Time episode
- Episode no.: Season 3 Episode 6
- Directed by: Ciaran Donnelly
- Written by: Edward Kitsis; Adam Horowitz
- Production code: 306
- Original air date: November 3, 2013

Guest appearances
- Joanna García Swisher as Ariel; Gil McKinney as Prince Eric; Robbie Kay as Peter Pan; Yvette Nicole Brown as Ursula

Episode chronology
← Previous "Good Form"	Next → "Dark Hollow"
- Once Upon a Time (season 3)

"Ariel" is the sixth episode of the third season of the American fantasy drama series Once Upon a Time, and the show's 50th episode overall. This episode also marks the debut of Ariel, played by Joanna García Swisher.

In this episode, the group finds a way to rescue Neal (Michael Raymond-James) from captivity through the Echo Cave; though it requires everyone to reveal their deepest secrets to each other. Meanwhile, back in the fairytale world, Snow White (Ginnifer Goodwin) is saved by Ariel (Joanna García Swisher), and then helps her reunite with Prince Eric (Gil McKinney), with The Evil Queen (Lana Parrilla) posing as Ursula in an attempt to stop them.

The episode — written by Edward Kitsis and Adam Horowitz — was watched by 7.55 million viewers, and received generally positive reviews from critics.

== Title card ==
The Little Mermaid, Ariel, perches on a rock in the Enchanted Forest.

== Plot ==
=== Event chronology ===
The Enchanted Forest events take place after "The Evil Queen" and before "Snow Falls" and "A Tale of Two Sisters". The Neverland events take place after "Good Form".

=== In the Characters' Past ===
Ariel (Joanna García Swisher) saves Snow White (Ginnifer Goodwin) from drowning after she runs off and jumps off a cliff to avoid capture by the Evil Queen's (Lana Parrilla) black knights. Snow later helps Ariel get closer to her love interest Prince Eric (Gil McKinney), whom she met when saving him from a shipwreck. Ariel is able to meet Prince Eric again at a ball, thanks to a legend that says every year the sea goddess Ursula grants mermaids the ability to walk on land at high tide for twelve hours. At the ball, Eric invites her on an expedition around the world. She then grows conflicted about whether to stay on land or return to the sea; however, the Evil Queen, having watched this from the mirror in Prince Eric's castle, sees an opportunity that she uses to her advantage.

Later that night, Ariel attempts to communicate with the goddess Ursula, but it's The Queen disguising herself as Ursula. She tells Ariel that she can make it so she stays human forever. The next day, Ariel approaches Snow and tells her about her encounter with Ursula. She puts an enchanted bracelet on Snow, turning her into a mermaid, and explains that this way both she and Snow can get what they want: Snow gets to escape from the Evil Queen and Ariel gets to remain human. The Evil Queen reveals herself before them, and orders Ariel to leave, stating that Snow White is going to die whether Ariel decides to go to Prince Eric, or stays with her friend. Ariel begins to leave, but then stabs the Queen in the neck with a fork, distracting her while she takes the bracelet off Snow that turned her into a mermaid. The two then escape before the Queen can act on vengeance. Snow then encourages Ariel to swim to Prince Eric's ship and reveal who she is and her love; however, as an act of revenge, the Evil Queen takes her voice from her, so she cannot call out for him. Heartbroken, she watches from afar as Eric finally turns to leave, having waited for her for a long time. Unfortunately, as the Queen returns to her fortress, she sees the real Ursula appear from the mirror, vowing to make her pay if she ever impersonates her again.

=== In Neverland ===
As Regina tries to teach Emma Swan (Jennifer Morrison) how to use magic, Hook (Colin O'Donoghue) arrives to tell David (Josh Dallas) and Mary Margaret (Ginnifer Goodwin) that Neal (Michael Raymond-James) is alive. At first, the trio decided they should keep this a secret from Emma, but unable to keep a secret, Mary Margaret, who didn't like keeping it from her, comes clean to Emma insisting that she deserves to know. Mary Margaret encourages Emma to believe that Neal is alive and should pursue him. Regina, disgusted by what she sees as a waste of time, decides to leave Hook and the Charming family and go it alone.

As Peter Pan watches from a distance, he orders Felix to take the caged Neal to a place where he hopes that this "game" will get more interesting, the Echo Caves. Emma and the gang track Neal's struggle marks, during which Emma confesses to Mary Margaret about kissing Hook. When they reach the Caves, Hook explains that the only way to save Neal is to reveal a dark secret. Inside, they see Neal locked in a cage but the only way to get to him is by creating a bridge as a rock separates the quartet from Neal. One by one, each comes clean: Hook about his feelings for Milah, and how having kissed Emma he realized he moved on from his first love when he met her; Mary Margaret feeling that having been robbed of experiencing having a daughter around, wants to have another child with David; and David finally coming clean about the Dreamshade and that because Hook saved him by using the water from the springs he won't be able to leave Neverland. As Emma races across the bridge, she reveals to Neal that she had wished that it was a trick and he was really dead. Despite still loving him, Emma admits that a part of her wished he was dead because it was easier to move on than relive all the pain he put her through. The cage is magically opened and Neal is free.

Now that they have escaped the cave and resume their quest to save Henry, it appears that the truth is causing more hurt than help among the rescuers, with Mary Margaret upset with David. As Neal says he can get them home once they rescue Henry, Emma apologizes to Neal about how she feels, but said it's not going to change, to which Neal responds that he's never going to stop fighting for her. Emma doesn't comment on this, merely looking an emotional wreck, and Hook overhears the conversation.

Meanwhile, Gold (Robert Carlyle) is visited by Peter Pan, who offers him poached eggs, but Gold refuses and vows to stop him and reunite with his son and grandson. Pan tells Gold he is wasting his time since Neal and Henry won't ever forgive him and suggests that he return to Storybrooke to be with Belle and start a family, which Gold rejects immediately. Moments later, the image of Belle returns to give Gold a chance to give up his quest to find Henry and start a new life back in Storybrooke, then convinces Gold that she is real and she tries to caress him. Regina immediately shows up and recognizes the image of Belle as Pan's shadow and she uses her magic to scare him off.

Seeing that Gold is not the Rumplestiltskin that she knew from the Enchanted Forest, Regina tells Gold that he needs to come back to his senses and suggests that they combine their powers to take down Pan by using a different approach besides killing him. Gold believes the answer lies back in Storybrooke at his pawn shop, so the only way to solve the problem is summon a person from her past. As they head to the beach, Regina uses a sea shell to summon a mermaid, who turns out to be Ariel. Regina then gives Ariel her voice back and gives her a mission, which is to retrieve an item from Storybrooke, which is where Ariel will also find her true love, Eric.

== Cultural references ==
Both the statue of Ursula and Regina's disguise are similar to the animated version of Ursula that was featured in The Little Mermaid, although both the disguise and the "real" Ursula are far slimmer than the animated version.

Regina also references the munchkins and the Yellow Brick Road from "The Wizard of Oz".

Eric mentions that he is out to explore the great deserts between his kingdom and Agrabah, suggesting that that city is located in the same world as the Enchanted Forest.

The fork that Snow teaches Ariel the name of which Ariel pronounces wrong is reference to how Ariel in The Little Mermaid was introduced to the fork by Scuttle who describes its use wrong by calling it a dingle hopper.

== Production ==
The episode was the first to feature Joanna García Swisher as Ariel, the protagonist of the 1989 Disney film The Little Mermaid. Garcia's casting was announced in August 2013. It also features the debut of her true love Prince Eric, who is played by Gil McKinney.

Series co-creator Edward Kitsis, who co-wrote the episode, stated that "once we realized we were going to Neverland, it felt like the perfect place to see Ariel." Garcia Swisher was pleased that the series had opted to stay true to the Disney film, explaining that "this is a girl that lives under the sea, that has fallen madly in love with this beautiful prince and will go to the ends of the earth to be with him and… it's a really romantic notion and I just loved the idea of it... It has that incredible storybook moment where their eyes meet and it's instant." It was her first acting experience after giving birth to her daughter earlier in the year.

On producing the episode, García Swisher stated that she was still feeling the effects of her pregnancy: "Well I just had a baby. I just took a deep breath and I said this is the little mermaid and she's a little voluptuous right now and I'm going to go with it." She continues, "It was a dream, and of course I had Ginny (Goodwin) to hold my hand when I realized, "Oh my god, I'm half naked!'"

== Reception ==
=== Ratings ===
For the second week in a row, this episode saw another spike in the ratings, as it placed a 2.3/6 among 18-49s with 7.55 million viewers tuning in, up a tenth from the previous episode. The number marked the highest viewing audience of the series since the show's second episode four weeks prior.

=== Critical reception ===
Ariel received generally positive reviews from critics, with most praising García Swisher's performance, but reserving criticism for the Neverland portion of the plot and the season's overall pacing.

In a review from Entertainment Weekly, Hillary Busis quotes, "To paraphrase the little mermaid herself, flipping its fins won't get a show too far -- unless there's some serious forward momentum propelling that paddling." and added that "Maybe the new MacGuffin Ariel's been sent to fetch will have the power to inject some energy into Operation Found Boy; maybe spending next week in Storybrooke will help give season 3 a roundness it's been sorely lacking. Either way, if the status quo doesn't change soon, I may go from grumpy to full-on maleficent."

Amy Ratcliffe of IGN gave the episode a 9 out of 10 — signifying positive reviews — saying "The mermaid was endearing, and Garcia couldn't have done a better job with her. She had terrific chemistry with everyone, too. The Echo Cave was a touch too convenient to get everyone to reveal their secrets, but it got them to Neal (and gave the story some forward momentum) so at least it was satisfying in those regards."

Christine Orlando of TV Fanatic also gave the episode a positive review, rating it 4 out of 5. She said "The little mermaid was beautiful, and magical, and naive. And much like the original Hans Christian Andersen fairy tale, she would not find her happy ending…but at least in this version she survives to continue to hope."

Alyse Whitney of Wetpaint also gave the episode a positive review, focusing more on the core characters' storylines other than on Ariel, saying her favorite coupling in the episode was Regina and Rumpelstiltskin's. She said "While it was far from romantic for the Evil Queen and the Dark One, it was a satisfying team-up." Lily Sparks of TV.com gave the episode a generally positive review, focusing positively on the cave scene, saying "the conceit of everyone having to shout their darkest secret while in a cave was sort of wonderful and inventive and got through a lot of bullshit effectively. I wish every show would agree to invoke the Cave of Echoes device on a yearly basis, sort of like a Halloween episode. It would sure as hell spice up Revenge." She also commented positively on Hook, Regina, and Rumpelstiltskin's role, saying "Announcing your dark secret of loving someone, the way Hook had the opportunity to do, is actually way more freeing and empowering than stomping off in a huff when the person you love decides to postpone looking for your son to go chase after their messed-up, abusive ex, so you end up swallowing your feelings and teaming up with the Dark One, which is just what Regina did in this episode. [sic] (Am I the only one who read this scene this way? The only love stories I find compelling on OUAT anymore are the ones the show isn't trying to shove down my throat!)"

Gwen Ihnat of The A.V. Club gave the episode a B− rating, saying that "It's really astounding how an entire of episode of Once Upon a Time can pass, some 43 minutes plus commercials, and still, so far this season, we pretty much always end in the same place we were when we started. As our troop enters week six of being stranded in Neverland, we again see so little progress that we are grateful for any small efforts. Regina and Rumple teaming up? A possible future visit to Storybrooke? Snow finding out that Charming got sick from dreamshade? Sure, we'll take it."

Kylie Peters of Den of Geek gave the episode mixed to positive reviews, saying "Emotional outbursts are the hot new dysfunction in season three of Once. Like past offerings, Ariel is slow for much of its run but offers a moment of intense feeling near the end. Luckily there's Ariel to offer something fresh and interesting to the episode. Oh, and there's lots of love triangle stuff, if you're into that. Sarah Shachat of Screen Crave also gave the episode mixed reviews, giving the episode a 6 out of 10, saying "The little beats of "Ariel" were stronger than its convoluted sum. But we'll happily take the reunion with Neal and a pleasing character introduction."
