= List of internet challenges =

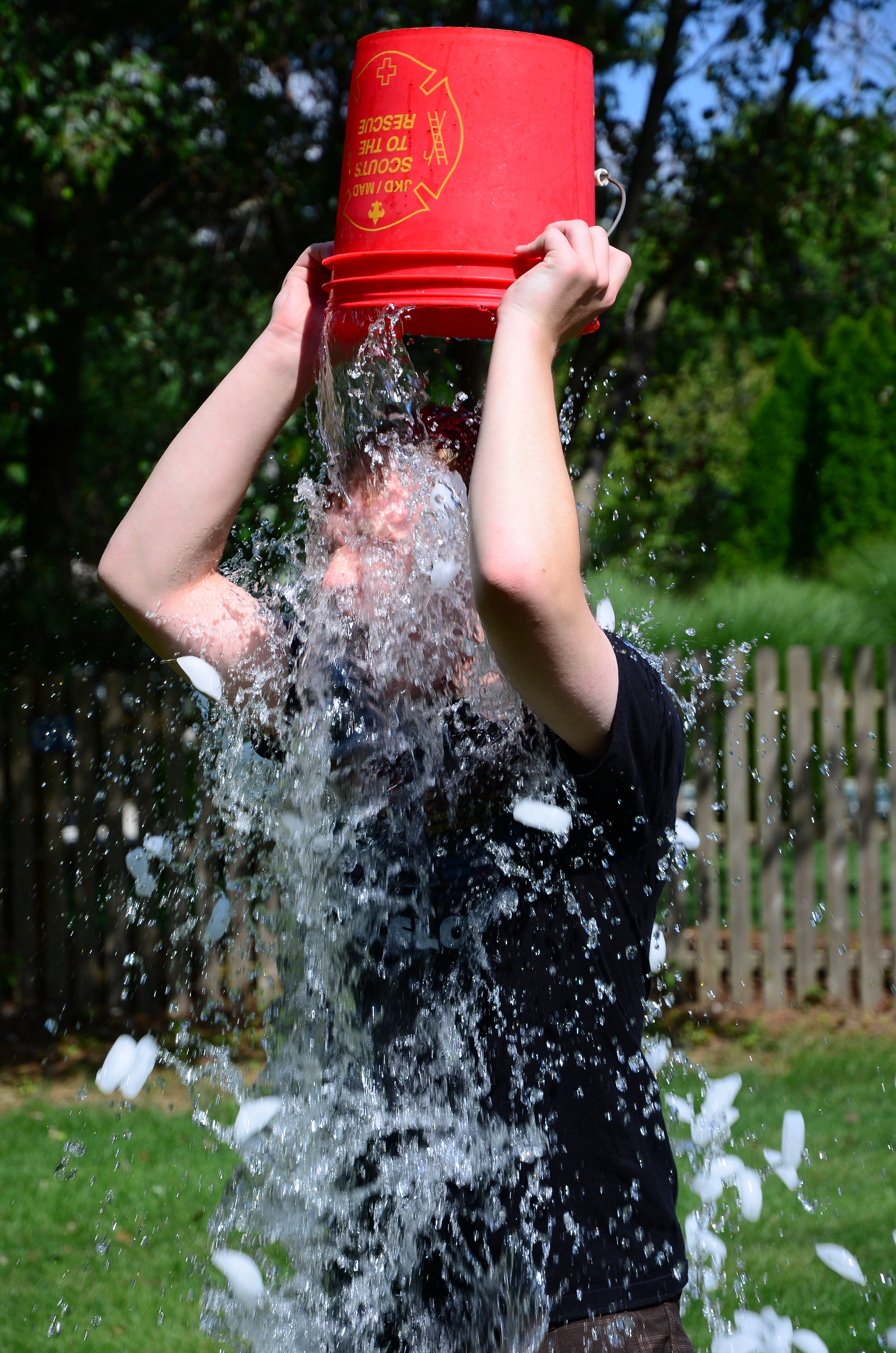
A person taking the ALS Ice Bucket Challenge

This is a list of internet challenges.

== Charity ==
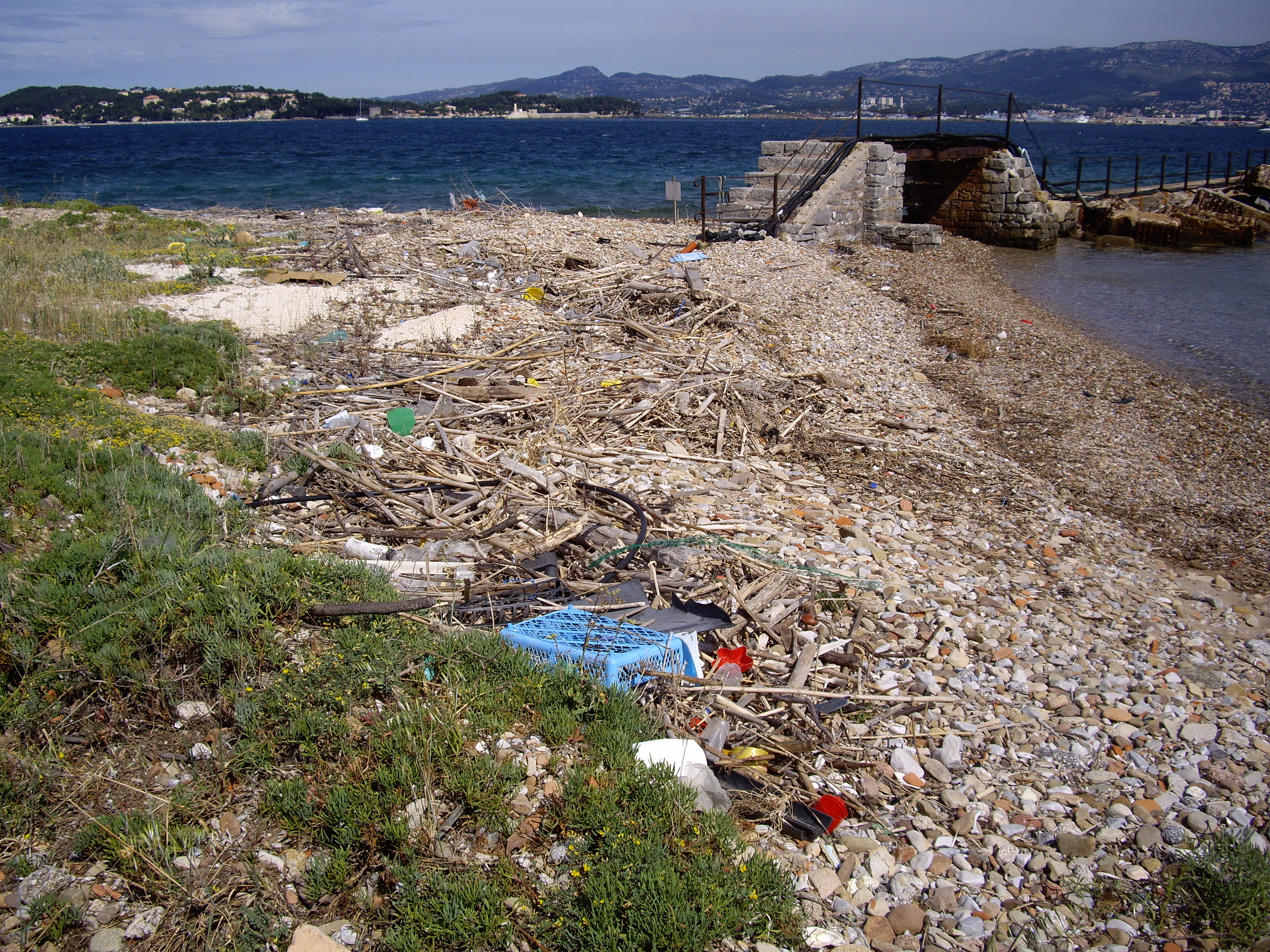
TrashTag Challenge CleanUp – before TrashTag Challenge

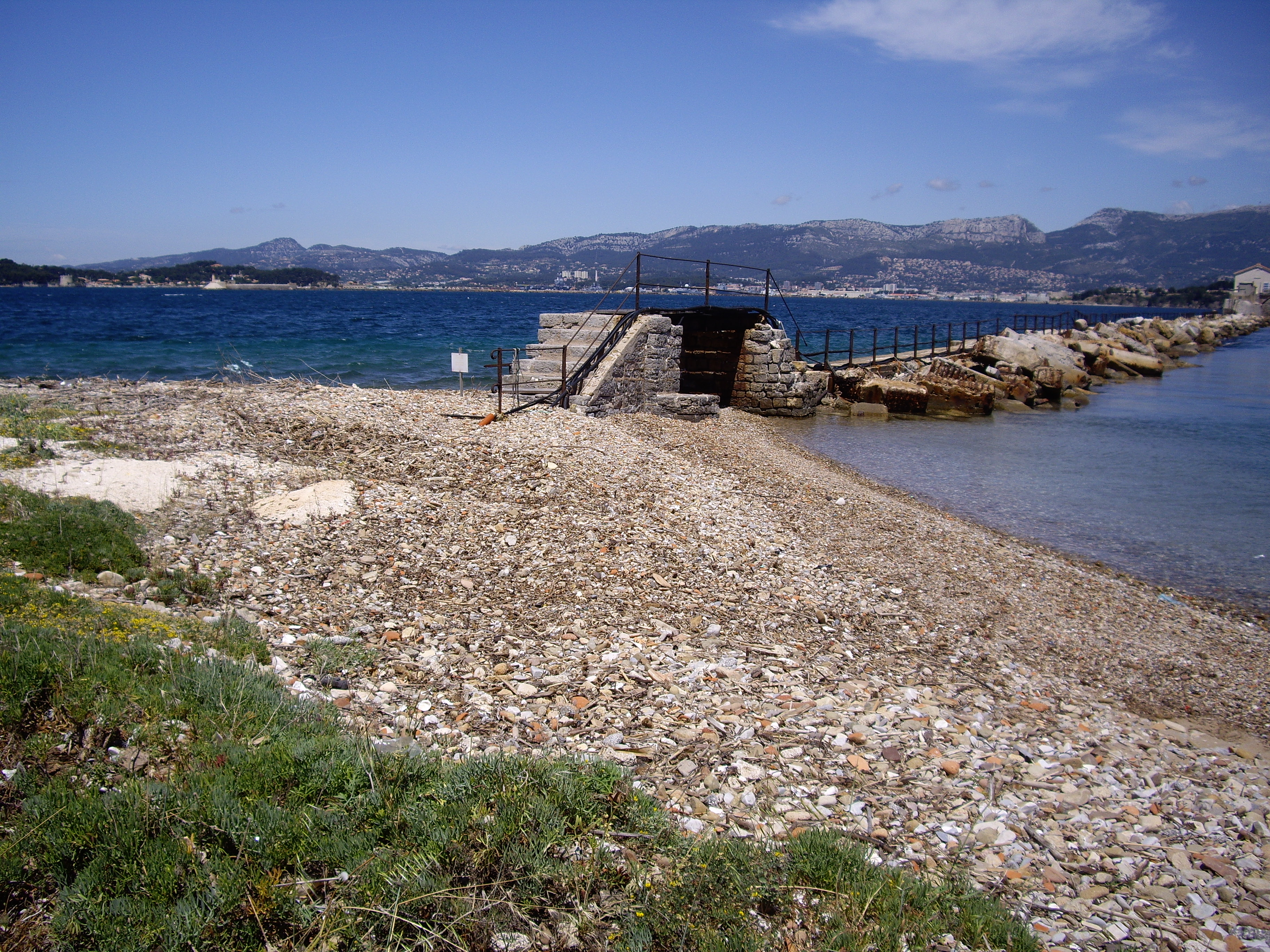
TrashTag Challenge CleanUp – after TrashTag Challenge

- Food Stamp or SNAP Challenge – A trend in the United States popularized by religious groups, community activists and food pantries, in which a family of means chooses to purchase food using only the monetary equivalent of what a family that size would receive in the US federal government Supplemental Nutrition Assistance Program (SNAP), colloquially called food stamps. In 2015, this amounted to US$194.00 per person per month, or nearly $7.00 per day.
- Ice Bucket Challenge – A charity-driven effort where a person "tags" three other people over social media, challenging them either to donate $100 to the ALS Association, or to otherwise douse themselves with a bucket of ice-cold water while filming themselves as well as making a smaller donation and tagging three others with the same challenge. As the challenge propagated, it tagged various celebrities and people with large numbers of social followers, causing the challenge to grow in a viral manner.
- Rice Bucket Challenge – This Indian origin challenge is the same as the Ice Bucket Challenge with a rice substitute.
- Trashtag Challenge – An environmental challenge encouraging people to clean-up litter and post before/after photos. The challenge went viral in 2019 and is part of a movement to clean up litter and trash from the outdoors. Organizations that are actively involved in the challenge include National CleanUp Day, Earth Day, Keep America Beautiful, and World Cleanup Day.

== Crime ==
A woman gallon smashing

- 24-Hour Fort challenge – A challenge where participants must reach a location or venue before it closes for the evening and trespass on the property by hiding in a 'fort'. This has led to arrests from law enforcement after employees discovered the trespassers.
- Devious lick – A trend, popular among teenagers, that involves stealing object(s) from school, such as soap, sanitizers and toilet paper.
- Door Kick Challenge – A challenge similar to knock down ginger but involves kicking a door of another person's house, then running away. At least one teenager was arrested in Arizona after causing $10,000 (USD) in damages.
- Gallon smashing – A challenge which surfaced on YouTube in 2013, invented by Zayd, Faysal, and Omar Khatib for TheChaizyChannel, gallon smashing involves obtaining bottles of liquid in a supermarket (usually cow's milk or water) and then throwing them against the floor and spilling their contents in such a way that the act is seen to be accidental rather than deliberate. The participant may attempt to damage other objects as they throw the bottles or fall into the resultant spill and seek the assistance of customers to help them up. Participants of this challenge have sustained injuries and received punishment from legal authorities, including the three teenagers who originally started the phenomenon.
- Happy slapping – A fad in parts of Europe around 2005, mostly in the UK and France, where people randomly attacked others in public and had themselves filmed. Multiple people were killed as a result of these incidents. An "anti happy-slapping" law enacted as a response to the fad in France resulted in a debate about censorship.
- Kia Challenge – This was a challenge where a series of motor vehicle thefts took place which targeted Kia and Hyundai vehicles in the United States. According to the National Highway Traffic Safety Administration, this has led to 8 deaths.
- Penny Outlet Challenge – A participant plugs a phone charger partly into an outlet, then touches a penny to the exposed prongs between the phone charger and the electrical socket, causing sparks and electrical damage and potentially starting a fire on the connected circuit. The Massachusetts State Fire Marshal issued a letter warning fire departments and schools regarding the challenge after three independent incidents in Massachusetts, two of which reportedly resulted in criminal charges. In December 2021, Amazon Alexa suggested the challenge to a 10-year-old. Alexa had reportedly taken the Penny Challenge from an online resource that specifically warned that the challenge was dangerous. Amazon later stated the problem had been fixed.
- Scientology Speedrunning – In 2026, TikTok users filmed themselves entering Church of Scientology facilities and attempting to run as far inside as possible before getting caught by security.
- "Trash Bucket Challenge" aka "peoples' lustration" – Video coverage of Ukrainian activists, many far-right, throwing allegedly corrupt politicians into trash dumpsters.
- "Chromebook Challenge" – A trend mainly practiced in schools, where students inserted things like metal, mechanical pencil lead, and other items into their Chromebook electrical ports to cause fires, create smoke, and destroy their devices. Cases have led to whole schools being evacuated. Sticking foreign objects into a Chromebook can burn a lithium battery, causing the Chromebook to catch on fire and release toxic smoke like hydrogen fluoride into the air. A TikTok video by business influencer Ben Azoulay claiming "F students are inventors" was associated with the trend, with The Daily Dot suggesting that the trend started as a way to mock the video. This is also linked to the "Chromebook Durability Test," a trend where students threw their Chromebooks against the walls, first seen in a video by TikTok user @chapstick_1.

== Food and drink ==
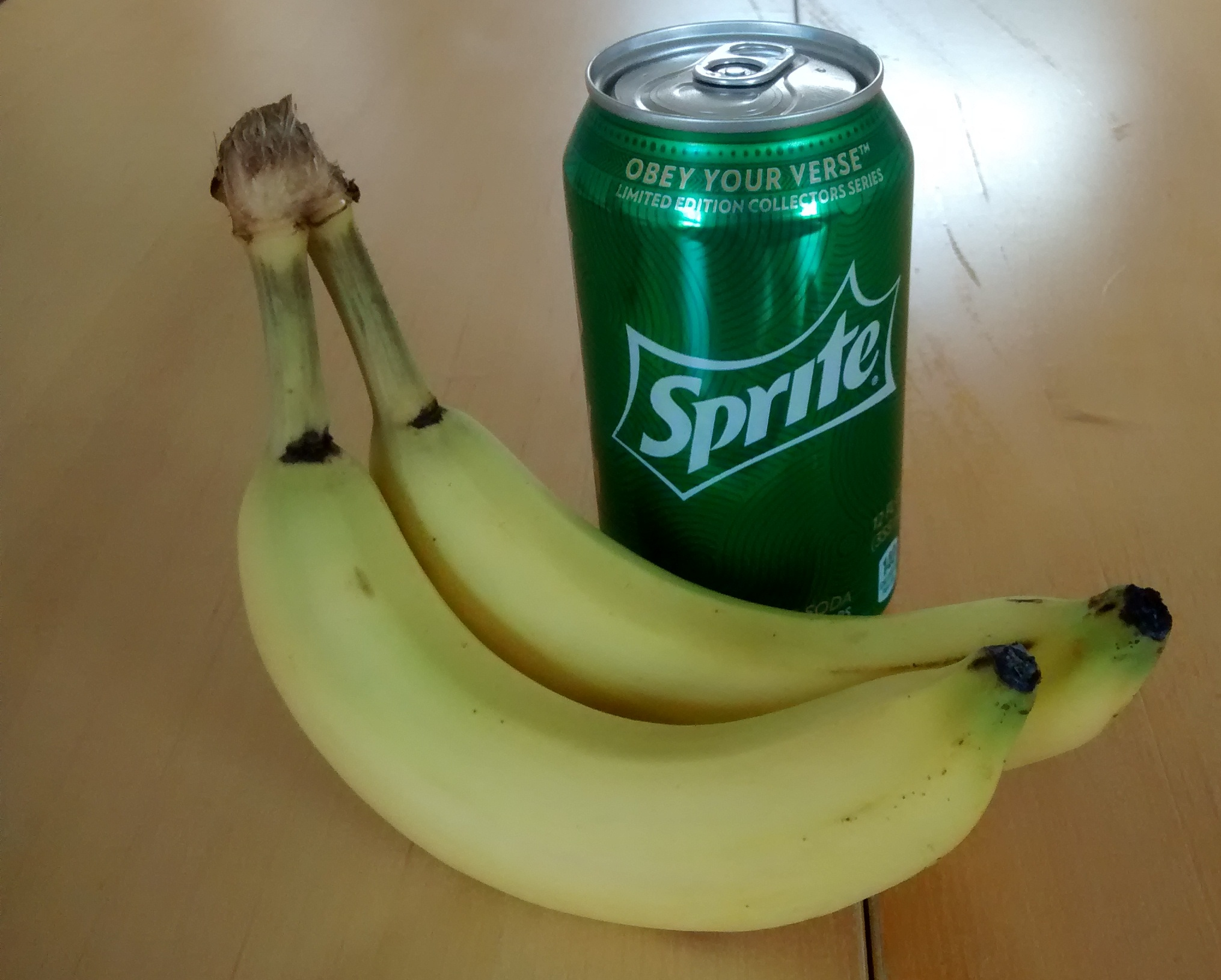
Bananas and a can of Sprite

- Cinnamon challenge – A viral internet food challenge. The objective of the challenge is to film oneself swallowing a spoonful of ground cinnamon in under 60 seconds without drinking anything, then upload the video to the internet. The challenge is difficult and carries substantial health risks because the cinnamon coats and dries the mouth and throat, resulting in coughing, gagging, vomiting, and inhaling of cinnamon, leading to throat irritation, breathing difficulties, and risk of pneumonia or a collapsed lung.
- One Chip Challenge – A challenge that started in 2016, and formerly promoted by Paqui, a tortilla chip brand owned by The Hershey Company. Participants must eat one Paqui Carolina Reaper chip, sold individually, and avoid eating or drinking anything afterwards. After a 14-year-old boy died on the same day that he attempted the challenge, Paqui withdrew the super-spicy chips from sale and offered refunds to customers.
- Banana and Sprite Challenge – A challenge that requires consuming two bananas and a can of Sprite, as this can cause vomiting.

== Human body ==
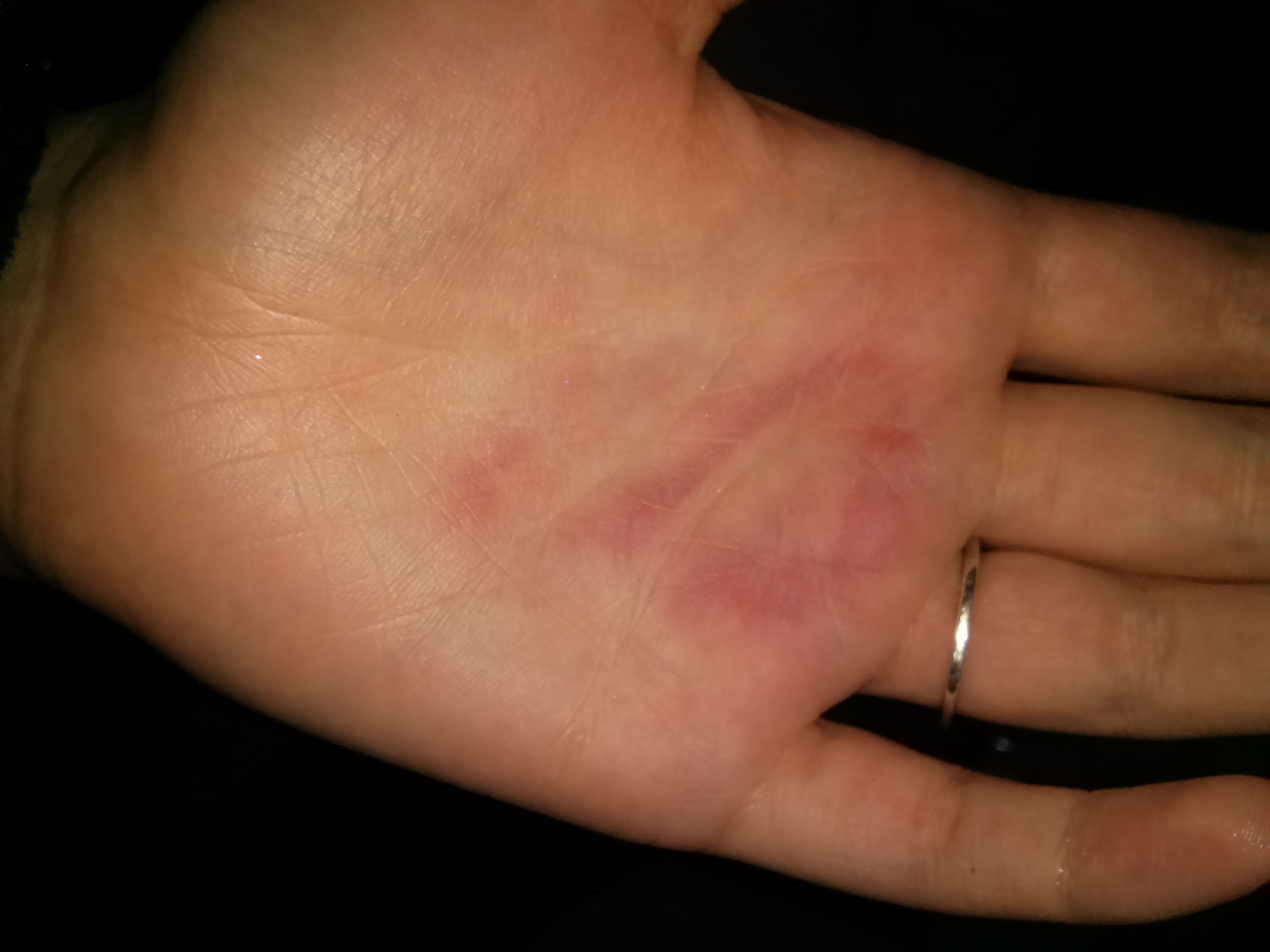
A hand after performing the salt and ice challenge

- Deodorant challenge – A trend that involves either spraying deodorant onto the bare skin, often causing aerosol burns, or directly inhaling deodorant, trying to achieve a high. This can cause a variety of symptoms, most notably asphyxia.
- Eraser Challenge – A trend popular among school children where one rubs an eraser on their bare skin as hard as they can while reciting the English alphabet. This forceful rubbing action can cause friction burns and scars to the skin if prolonged, and put the affected area at risk of infection, thus leading to parental concerns.
- Fire challenge – An activity which refers to the application of flammable liquids to one's body and then setting the liquids aflame, while being video recorded. The aftermath is then posted to Social Media sites. Firefighters, police officers and media sources have chastised and spoken out against the activity, hoping to dissuade individuals from trying it due to its harmful nature. In 2021, a TikTok variant of this challenge involves drawing shapes on the bare skin using any flammable substance (typically alcohol) and lighting it on fire, resulting in similar consequences to the original.
- Kylie Jenner Lip Challenge – Based on trying to recreate the full lips of television star Kylie Jenner, internet users show themselves using a small vessel like a shot glass that covers their lips, drawing all the air out of the vessel, and then releasing, which temporarily puffs the lips by drawing the user's blood into them. The activity is considered harmful, both from bruising and dis-figuration of the lips, and the potential for the vessel to shatter and cut the person.
- Salt and ice challenge – Internet phenomenon wherein participants pour salt on their bodies, usually on the arm and ice is then placed on the salt. This causes a "burning" sensation, and participants are challenged to withstand the pain for as long as they can. The challenge is recorded and posted on YouTube or other forms of social media. This challenge has caused many burns as a result.
- Tooth Filing Challenge – A TikTok challenge involving participants using a nail or cuticle file to smooth out the rough edges or level uneven areas of their teeth. Dentists and orthodontists spoke out against this trend, as doing so can damage the enamel layer, which can lead to increased risk of fracture and cavities.
- Yoga Challenge – A continuing YouTube video trend that first went viral during the summer of 2014 involving participants who attempt to perform a series of acroyoga poses that are taken from the internet. Typically, participants are not trained in yoga, which results in humorous outcomes (awkward stances, falling down, etc.). These attempts are captured on film, usually on a smartphone or tablet camera, and uploaded to YouTube. Usually, prior to attempting a pose, participants will show an image of the pose they are attempting. The contrast between correct poses by professionals and incorrect poses by amateurs adds to the humor. YouTuber Alfie Deyes posted a video titled The Yoga Challenge! in June 2014 which may have set off the trend. Deyes' video may have been inspired by various popular "couples' stunts" and "yoga fail" videos by channels such as BFvsGF posted as early as 2012. BFvsGF reattempted the trend by posting a video titled "Acro Yoga Challenge" in July 2014. The "challenge" part may stem from the "30-Day yoga challenge" that was a popular fitness vlogging trend on YouTube as early as the mid-2000s.

== Music ==
- Everywhere at the End of Time – A challenge in which people listen to this six-hour album set from Leyland James Kirby, a sonic depiction of dementia that features early 20th-century recordings (most prominently the 1931 song "Heartaches") slowly become more degraded and jumbled until it devolves into noise in line with a dementia patient's memory and cognitive function. It emerged as an internet challenge in 2020. Kirby was strongly in favor of the challenge as a way to raise awareness of dementia.
- Little Drummer Boy Challenge / Whamageddon – Two related challenges/avoidance games in which the participant attempts to avoid hearing a particular Christmas song (any version of "The Little Drummer Boy" in the former, the original recording of "Last Christmas" by Wham! in the latter) during the Christmas and holiday season.
- Mannequin Challenge – a viral internet video trend that started in October 2016 where people remain still while a video is recorded, usually with music in the background, most commonly "Black Beatles" by Rae Sremmurd. It became especially popular with sports teams and athletes.
- Running Man Challenge – A series of dance videos originally created by Hillside, New Jersey, high school students Kevin Vincent and Jeremiah Hall on Instagram that uses the song "My Boo" by Ghost Town DJ's.

== Stunts ==
- Bird Box Challenge – For its film Bird Box, where a significant plot element has characters keeping themselves blindfolded to prevent insanity, Netflix partnered with Twitch streamers to challenge them to play video games blindfolded. However, the challenge morphed into people attempting everyday activities fully blindfolded while being recorded, which included attempting to cook, walk in busy streets, and drive cars. Several of these videos have gone viral, but others repeating the challenges have gotten themselves into a number of non-fatal injuries. Netflix and law officials have issued warnings that people should only perform Bird Box challenges in safe, isolated places to eliminate the potential to injure themselves and others.
- Blackout Challenge/Choking Game – A challenge involving deliberately tying belts, cords, and other ligatures around ones neck, for the purpose of experiencing a "high". While the blackout challenge did not originate on the internet, it had resurfaced in popularity on TikTok during the COVID-19 pandemic. Several participants, mainly children and teenagers, had been hospitalized, and seven children had reportedly died, including a 10-year-old Sicilian girl who asphyxiated and was later declared brain dead after attempting the challenge.
- Bottle Cap Challenge – A martial arts challenge where one must kick the bottle cap off without knocking over the bottle itself.
- Condom challenge – A viral internet challenge. The challenge involves inserting a latex condom into the nostril and snorting it into the nasal cavity and back through the throat to be coughed out of the mouth. The term "condom challenge" was coined in May 2012 following the widespread popularity of the cinnamon challenge, but the idea is several years old and videos of challenge attempts date to at least 2007. The challenge went viral in April 2013, when WorldStarHipHop posted a video of two young women attempting the challenge, and several people subsequently uploaded videos onto the internet of themselves attempting the challenge. The stunt poses potential choking hazards.
- Fence plowing – Challenge which gained some notoriety in 2007, and involves attempting to run through a closed fence. Later rebranded as the Kool-Aid Man Challenge in 2021 following a resurgence on TikTok.
- Milk crate challenge – Involves stacking milk crates and climbing the resulting structure, which is usually unstable and the resulting fall is likely to cause injuries.
- Planking – An internet phenomenon, which originated in 2008 and reached peak virality in 2011, which involved lying face down in peculiar, humorous, and sometimes dangerous locations.
- Skullbreaker challenge – A TikTok challenge that went viral in February 2020 and spread to other sections of the internet. The challenge possibly originated in Venezuela and involves two people convincing another person to jump, and then kicking their legs out, causing the person jumping to fall on their head. Several people have been hospitalized after performing this challenge, but no deaths have been reported.

== Others ==
- Benadryl challenge – A challenge involving taking dangerous amounts of Benadryl, to achieve a high, and experience hallucinations. Several teenagers had been hospitalized as a result of participating in the challenge, and one teenager from Oklahoma had reportedly died.
- Charlie Charlie Challenge – A ouija-emulating ritual in which the spirit of a Mexican demon named "Charlie" is invoked via two pencils in the shape of a cross and the words "yes" and "no" written on paper in a square. Social media users began circulating videos of pencils moving to the word "yes" when asking if the demon is present.
- Fairy Flying – A trend which involves images of people "floating" in midair with their heads out of the frame, in an attempt to mimic suicide by hanging. Several mental health doctors have spoken out against it due to it possibly being able to encourage suicidal thoughts or negative thoughts amongst people who have had family members who have attempted or commit suicide.
- No Nut November – An internet challenge revolving around abstinence, in which participants abstain from masturbation and ejaculation, or colloquially "to nut", during the month of November. It originated in the early 2010s and grew in popularity on social media during and after 2017.
- Sailor Moon redraw challenge – A challenge in which artists redraw a screenshot of Sailor Moon, the character from the series of the same name, in their own art styles. Alternatively, the scene is redrawn with another fictional character taking her place.
- Tide Pod Challenge – Similar to other eating challenges, this saw people attempt to eat Tide Pods, small packets filled with laundry detergent and other chemicals that normally dissolve while in a washing machine. The challenge gained attention in late 2017 and early 2018, and quickly was addressed by several health-related organizations, as the chemicals in the packet are poisonous and toxic to humans. These agencies sought to warn users and strongly discourage the challenge after dozens of cases of poisoning were reported within the first few weeks of 2018, while YouTube took action to remove videos related to the challenge to further stop its spread.
- Vans challenge – trend where people showed Vans shoes landing upright after being tossed upward, started in March 2019 following a Twitter video.
