= Salt and ice challenge =

Internet challenge

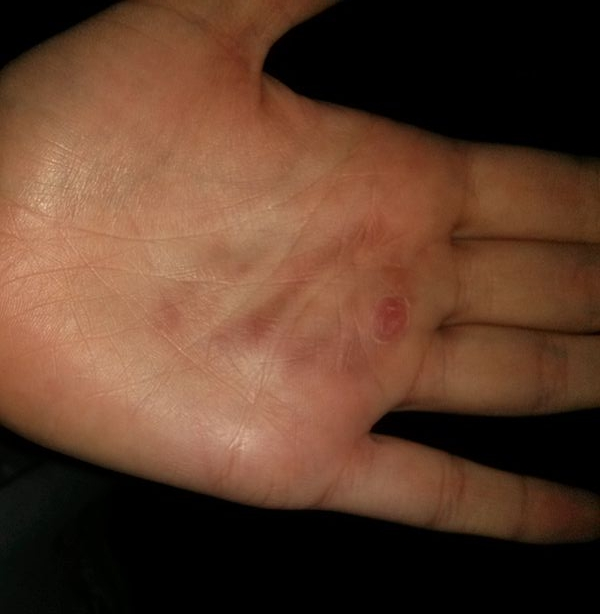
Scarring as a result of the salt and ice challenge, eleven days after performing it

The salt and ice challenge is an Internet challenge in which participants pour salt on their bodies, usually on the arm, and ice is then placed on the salt. This causes a "burning" sensation similar to frostbite, and participants try to withstand the pain for the longest time. The challenge can be recorded and posted on YouTube or other forms of social media.

The ice and salt create an eutectic frigorific mixture which can get as cold as −18 °C (0 °F).

The stunt can quickly cause second- and third-degree injuries similar to frostbite or being burnt with the metal end of a lighter, as well as causing painful open sores to form on the skin. Due to the numbing sensation of the cold and possible nerve damage during the stunt, participants are often unaware of the extent of any injuries sustained during the challenge, only feeling pain once the salt on their skin enters lesions created during the challenge. Skin discoloration from the challenge may remain after the challenge has been attempted.

== Scientific explanation ==
The salt and ice form an eutectic frigorific mixture. Molecular polarity is key to this reaction. The ions in sodium chloride (table salt) are heavily influenced by the molecular polarizability of the ice. The difference between the spacing of the electrons in the table salt and ice causes this reaction. The melting point of ice is decreased due to the incorporation of table salt and this then causes a binding of the two substances. The ice is neutralized by the salt, thus causing the ice to melt more easily and quickly.

== Health hazards and injury recovery ==
The stunt leaves behind an ice burn that increases in severity the longer the chemical reaction on the skin continues. In this ice burn, the ice crystals that form have the potential to burn and scar the skin permanently. Blistering at the site of injury is common in more severe cases. The freezing of tissue between the dermal and epidermal levels of the skin leads to a disruption in blood circulation, initially causing frost nip. After a few days, depending on the severity and duration of the burn, epithelial cells should slowly regenerate along with scarring and surface disruption.

== In popular culture ==
The salt and ice challenge was popularized on YouTube and other social media in the late 2000s and early 2010s. The first documented video of the salt and ice challenge was posted to YouTube in 2006 by user OxZmoran. They performed the stunt and garnered over 100,000 views. The first viral salt and ice challenge was posted to the entertainment site eBaum's World, in which a group of teenagers attempted the challenge and garnered almost 500,000 views. This virality led to other popular influencers, YouTubers, and online personalities attempting the salt and ice challenge and posting the results online.

== Online news and media ==
Due to the challenge's increase in popularity during the 2010s, many local and national news stations reported incidents of the challenge harming those involved and warning against it. CBS News reported a case in Pittsburgh in 2012 in which a teen received serious burns from attempting the challenge. In 2017, ABC Action News described how many teens are influenced by online videos, and that by attempting these challenges they can be sent to the hospital. Media talk shows such as the Today Show posted an article directed to parents of teens, highlighting the dangers of social media and virality when influencing those to try online challenges.

== See also ==
- Cinnamon challenge
- Banana Sprite challenge
- Gallon challenge
- Saltine cracker challenge
- Tide Pod challenge
