= Aerosol burn =

aerosol frostbite of the skin
- Other names: Aerosol-induced frostbite
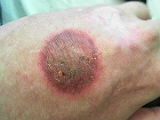
- Aerosol frostbite to the hand
- Specialty: Emergency medicine

An aerosol frostbite of the skin is an injury to the body caused by the pressurized gas within an aerosol spray cooling quickly, with the sudden drop in temperature sufficient to cause frostbite to the applied area. Medical studies have noted an increase of this practice, known as "frosting", in pediatric and teenage patients.

Adiabatic expansion and/or evaporative cooling (with a low boiling temperature) causes the gas to rapidly cool on exit from the aerosol applier. In freeze sprays, a controlled amount of this cooling is useful. Uncontrolled cooling, however, can result in freeze burns to the skin. According to controlled laboratory experiments, the gas from a typical deodorant spray can is able to reduce skin temperature by up to sixty degrees Celsius.

The form of injury is freezing of the skin, a type of frostbite. It is highly advised for those who develop frostbite to seek medical attention.

In rare cases aerosol-induced burns can be severe enough to necessitate skin grafting.

== Signs and symptoms ==
An example of postinflammatory hypopigmentation (the light white patches) about one year after a severe aerosol burn.

Depending on the duration of exposure aerosol-induced frostbite can vary in depth. Most injuries of this type only affect the epidermis, the outermost layer of skin. However, if contact with the aerosol is prolonged the skin will freeze further and deeper layers of tissue will be affected, causing a more serious burn that reaches the dermis, destroys nerves, and increases the risk of infection and scarring. When the skin thaws, pain and severe discomfort can occur in the affected area. There may be a smell of aerosol products such as deodorant around the affected area, the injury may itch or be painful, the skin may freeze and become hardened, blisters may form on the area, and the flesh can become red and swollen.

== Causes ==
The most common cause of aerosol burns is patients' spraying deodorants for prolonged periods of time in close proximity to their skin. This practice is more common in younger persons such as teenagers and can be referred to as "frosting" or having a "frosty". Injuries such as these are often self-inflicted, and depression should be considered as an underlying cause. However, some do it for social media attention in viral video posts or after peer pressure, the "Deodorant Challenge" being analogous to the Cinnamon challenge and Tide Pod challenge.

However, some do it due to influence by their peers as a way of "impressing" them, with the "Aerosol Challenge" gaining popularity alongside the "Cinnamon Challenge" and "Chubby Bunny" contests as trends in dangerous peer-pressure-induced self-harm.

=== Unintentional ===
A person can cause frostbite by accidental prolonged contact, using an aerosol on one place for too long. This is often done with deodorants, but other products such as asthma inhalers are also common causes of injury. Injuries are especially common with younger children who "try it out" not knowing all the possible dermatological effects. In rarer cases aerosol burns are reported to have been caused by air fresheners and other compressed aerosol canisters exploding.

=== Intentional and abuse ===
Fluorinated hydrocarbon (fluorocarbon) aerosol propellants can be abused, as with solvents. A common form is huffing as a means of intoxication. When inhaled, aerosols can cause the same frostbite as on other parts of the body. The National Institute on Drug Abuse (NIDA) has published various resources on the internet warning of the effects of this abuse.

Some aerosol burns are intentionally self-inflicted, the reasons being emotional/psychological. Household aerosol products such as air fresheners and deodorants can be a convenient, easily available means to satisfy the compulsions.

== Treatment ==
Various methods of treatment are used, depending greatly on the length of exposure and other factors. There are documented cases using both conservative and invasive treatments, including skin grafting and/or the application of nonadhesive dressing alongside topical corticosteroids to reduce inflammation. However, the use of steroids may exacerbate fungal infections if the aerosol product used is an antifungal medicine. In some patients postinflammatory hypopigmentation or hyperpigmentation may result in the months after initial injury, and ultraviolet protection such as sunscreen is essential to prevent an elevated risk of skin cancer in the damaged tissues. The pain caused by these burns is often intense and can be prolonged, making a pain management plan important. This often includes short term prescriptions of painkillers.

In the case of self-harm induced injury the underlying mental health aspects should be treated as with all self-inflicted injuries.

== See also ==
- List of cutaneous conditions
- Deodorant
- Aerosol spray
- Freeze spray
- Frostbite
- Burn
