= Milk chugging =

Sport of consuming a large amount of milk within a set time

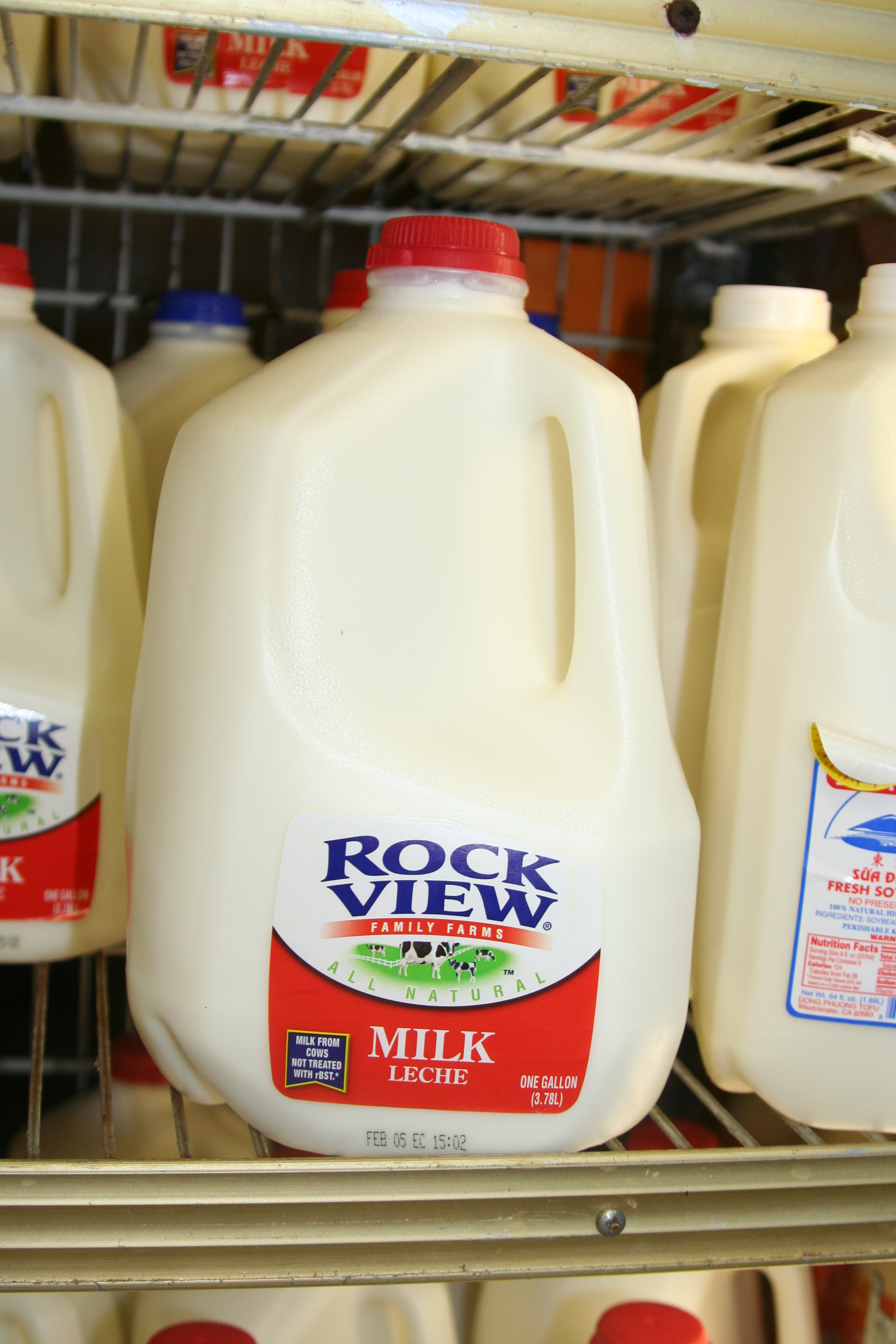
A gallon jug of milk

Milk chugging, or the gallon challenge or milk challenge, is the "sport" of consuming a large amount of milk within a set period of time. Although procedures vary, the general requirements are that a person is given 60 minutes to drink one US gallon (3.8 L; 0.8 imp gal) of whole milk without vomiting. A gallon milk jug is a common size of milk container in the United States.

== History ==
The first recorded occurrences of competitive milk chugging date back to early 1997 with several explanations for the challenge’s origins. American baseball pitcher Bill Lee mentioned the challenge in his autobiography The Wrong Stuff as one of the activities that relief pitchers used to pass the time in the bullpen as far back as the late 1960s, and presumably has been independently discovered many times in the past. Undoubtedly, the most highly publicized competition was one that was featured in the fifth episode of the second season of the American television series Jackass, where Dave England and Ehren McGhehey were featured in a gallon challenge segment. Filmed in Portland, Oregon in 2000, contestants were to consume one gallon of milk in an hour in a variety of flavors, which resulted in each participant vomiting.

Milk chugging has gained popularity and a following in some countries, especially the United States. The fact that it is often presented as being "impossible", as well as media coverage of the challenge, may have led to the appeal among high school and college students, as well as celebrities.

== Medical explanation ==
The human stomach capacity is around half a gallon (1.9 L)

The primary difficulty in completing the challenge lies in the limited capacity of the stomach. Generally, the stomach has an average capacity of only half a gallon (1.9 L). Stretch receptors in the organ sense when its limit is reached, triggering a vomit reflex. Moreover, drinking a gallon of milk is more difficult than drinking a gallon of water. The fat and protein in milk each inhibit the stomach from releasing its contents into the small intestine, forcing more of the liquid to remain in the stomach. In turn, the action of gastric acid and proteases in the stomach causes the casein in the milk to coagulate, turning the milk into a thick, semi-solid substance with a similar consistency to mozzarella, further reducing the amount of fluid that can be held in the stomach without being regurgitated.

== Rules ==
There are three universal rules in what has been called the "gallon challenge", although some minor variations may exist.

- The contestant has one hour to drink one US gallon (3.8 L; 0.8 imp gal) of milk. Specifications on the type of milk vary, or are unspecified.
- Should the contestant finish the gallon within that hour, they must retain the gallon for a set period. There are several variations of this rule; either the milk must simply be drunk in an hour without vomiting, or the drinker must retain the contents for one additional hour or the remainder of the hour without vomiting.
- Should they retain the gallon, they win. If the contestant vomits prior to the set period, they lose.

Although in almost all cases, the challenge is set for one gallon, in some cases a different amount is used, such as six US pints (2.84 L; 5.00 imp pt). Other variations of the challenge require that the contestant eats nothing during the hour of ingestion, and specify that the type of milk chosen must have at least a 2% fat content (not skimmed milk).

== Legacy ==
Many high school and college students hold their own challenges: Phi Delta Tau, at the Central College in Pella, Iowa have traditionally hosted an annual gallon challenge, four Rutgers fraternities host challenges for fundraisers, some MIT students celebrated the 2010 4th of July with a challenge, Sigma Phi Epsilon at Carnegie Mellon University hosts their Annual Gallon Challenge on campus, as well as many other official and unofficial gallon challenges. In 2008, several members of a fraternity at Arizona State University participating in a "milk-chug" were arrested for causing a car accident after vomiting into traffic below the bridge they were competing on.

Peter Ubriaco founded the non-profit Gallon Challenge Foundation in 2004, formalizing a local gallon-challenge contest held since 2000. The organization raised donations during the yearly challenge for food and health-related organizations; after their 2006 challenge held in New York City, they donated to the Food Allergy Initiative, a non-profit organization that raises awareness and funds for the treatment and cure of food allergies.

The act of milk-chugging has also been the centerpiece for a photographer and artists' show in 2005, where he featured an image entitled "Milk Chuggers" and a video called "The Milk Chugger", where he films himself drinking milk until he vomits. In 2009, Jimmy Fallon held a milk-chugging contest on NBC's Late Night with Jimmy Fallon, with guests Hélio Castroneves, Ryan Briscoe, and Dario Franchitti. On the broadcast, Fallon wore a rain poncho and drank chocolate milk, while the drivers drank regular milk. Also in 2009, and again in 2010, North Carolina members of the General Assembly, which included Bob Atwater, William Brisson, Andrew Brock, Dewey Hill, Joe Sam Queen, and Arthur Williams, competed in a milk-chugging contest, held at North Portico of the Legislative Building in Raleigh, to raise awareness in the dairy industry. Winners of the contest would receive money to donate to a charity of their choice.

== See also ==
- Food challenge
- Gallon smashing
- Cinnamon challenge
- Competitive eating
- Saltine cracker challenge
- Salt and ice challenge
