= Peaches Corner =

Restaurant in Myrtle Beach, South Carolina, U.S.

- Interactive map of Peaches Corner

Restaurant information
- Location: 900 North Ocean Blvd., Myrtle Beach, South Carolina, United States
- Coordinates: 33°41′32″N 78°52′46″W
- Seating capacity: 56
- Website: peachescorner.com

Peaches Corner is a restaurant in Myrtle Beach, South Carolina, United States. It has operated since 1937. The menu includes burgers and French fries, corn dogs and hot dogs, and beer. The business has been operated by the same family since 1945.

The restaurant has a seating capacity of 56 people. It has a food challenge; the Peaches Challenge includes a Peaches Double-Stacker (double/double cheeseburger with lettuce, tomato and mayonnaise), a foot-long hot dog with chili, coleslaw, mustard, and onions, a large order of chili cheese fries, and a peach milkshake.
