= One million pound challenge =

The One Million Pound Challenge (OMPC) during Earth Week 2015, was created by Advanced Technology Recycling (ATR) to raise awareness of the importance of recycling. The goal was to keep more than one million pounds of electronics out of landfills (e-waste) by properly disposing of them.

The primary objective of the One Million Pound Challenge (OMPC) is to raise awareness for Earth Day. The event was created to include Earth Day and spans an entire week (April 17 through April 26), during which corporate sponsors encourage employees to help collect e-Waste.

ATR broke the Guinness Book of World Records for the Most Consumer Electronics Recycled in One Week (Multiple Locations) on April 25, 2015, during the OMPC.

== See also ==
- Internet challenges
