= Saad Abid =

- Born: December 9, 1981 (age 44)
- Citizenship: Morocco
- Education: John Molson School of Business
- Occupation: President of Bahri Association
- Years active: 2010 - Current

Saad Abid (born 9 December 1981) is a Moroccan environmental activist and founder of the Bahri Association.

== Biography ==
Saad Abid studied at the John Molson School of Business at Concordia University in Montreal before returning to Morocco in 2009. In 2010, he founded the Bahri Association, a non-profit environmental organization focused on coastal conservation and environmental awareness.

In 2018, Saad Abid launched the "Maymkench2026" campaign in support of Morocco's bid to host the 2026 FIFA World Cup. He has participated to the 2015 United Nations Climate Change Conference (COP21), and contributed to the development of ''Chbyka'', a tool for collecting microplastic waste from beaches.
