= Milk crate challenge =

Viral Internet video trend

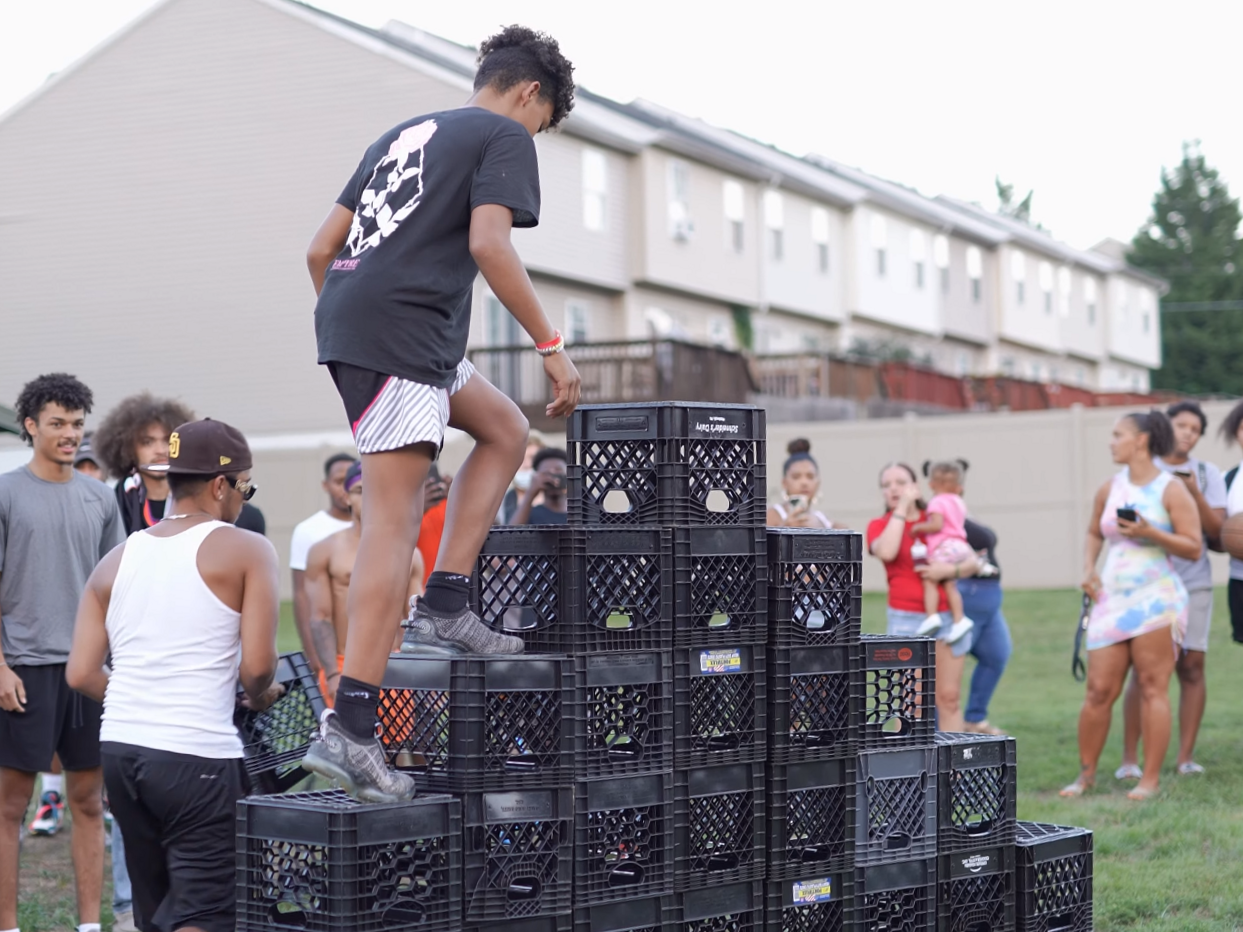
A child participating in the milk crate challenge, showing the structure built from crates

The milk crate challenge, also known as the crate challenge, is a video challenge that became viral online in August 2021. The challenge involves stacking milk crates into a structure that resembles a podium, with both sides of the structure functioning as stairs. The participant is expected to climb up to the top of the crates and climb back down without destroying the structure or falling, risking injury. The activity has faced criticism by health professionals for its unnecessary risk to personal health. Social media platform TikTok, where the trend was popularized, said it would eliminate search results for "milk crate challenge" citing its policy that "prohibits content that promotes or glorifies dangerous acts."

Due to the instability of the stacked crates, participants often fall while ascending or descending the podium, risking serious injury. Falling during the challenge has led to a variety of injuries, including dislocated shoulders and rotator cuff tears, ACL tears, meniscus tears, broken wrists and even spinal cord injuries.

Some medical professionals have warned against attempting the challenge, saying that the relative instability of the stacked crates poses a high risk of injury. On August 25, 2021, TikTok made a statement that they will remove videos with the hashtag and return a message about TikTok's community standards when a user looks up the #MilkCrateChallenges, according to its guidelines. The challenge has also led to the concern of theft within the dairy industry and is considered a crime in many states. Dairy industries lose around $80 million per year due to theft according to the IDFA in 2012. Some articles noted that there was increased risk to participants as many hospitals were dealing with a surge of the Delta variant of COVID-19 in August 2021.

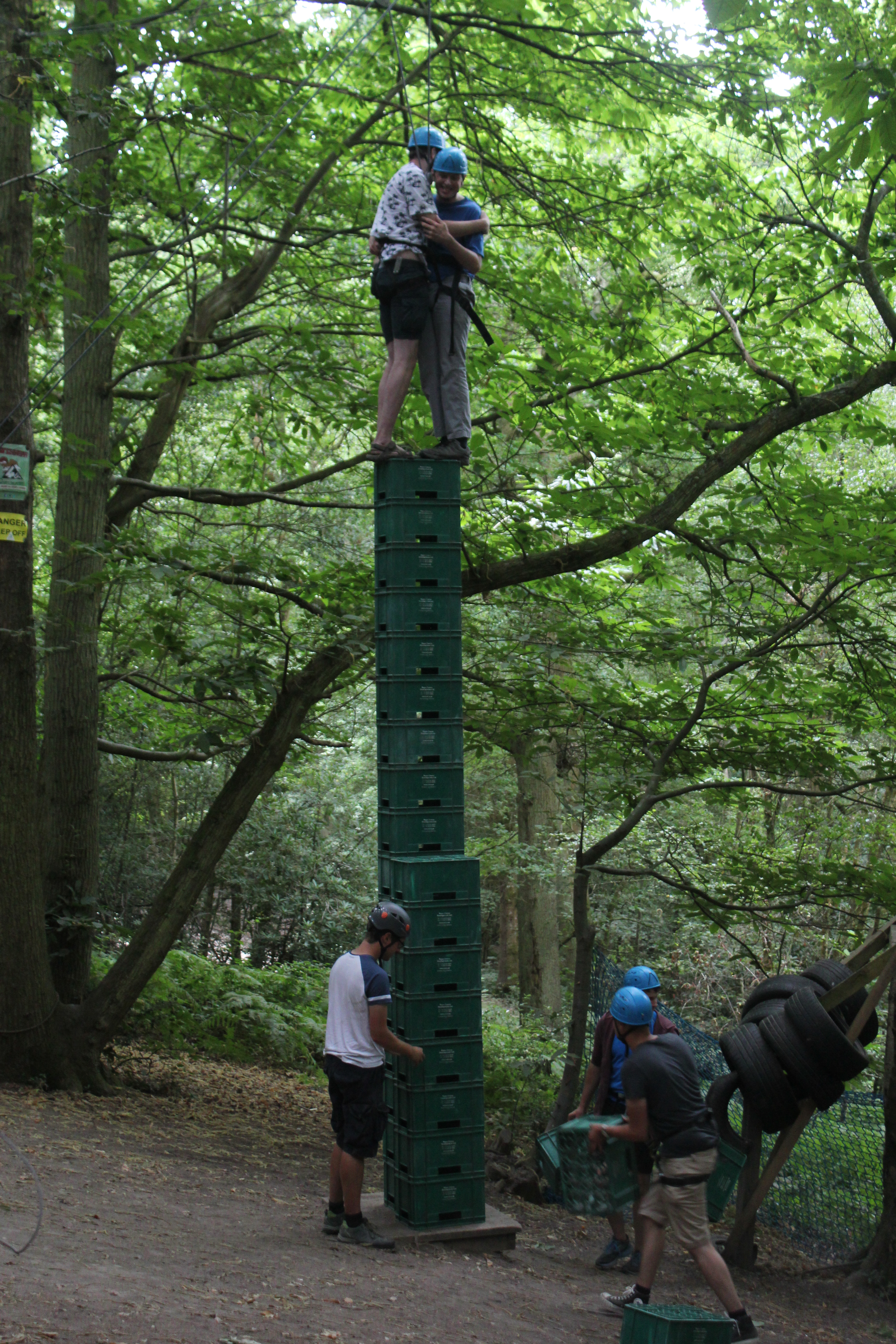
A professionally organized single stack crate climbing exercise, using protective helmets and safety harnesses

An earlier and similar challenge is a crate-climbing task offered as a team building exercise by some outdoor activity centers. In the task, participants build a tower of plastic crates while climbers stand on the stack and add additional crates as it grows, with other team members passing crates from the ground. When organized by professionals, the use of safety lines and helmets makes the activity safer than in the viral video trend. The world record for the highest crate stack climbed solo was set by Christof Riesenhuber in 2009, when he climbed a single column of 49 beer crates, at a height of 12.74 metres (41.8 ft).

== See also ==
- Gallon smashing
- Milk chugging
- Consumption of Tide Pods
- Benadryl challenge, a reported trend of videos showing deliberate overdoses on the medication Benadryl
- Skullbreaker challenge, a 2020 internet challenge involving deliberately inflicting a head injury on participants by tripping them
- Devious licks, a challenge that went viral on TikTok in 2021 involving theft and vandalism of school property by students
