= Bahri Association =

Moroccan environmental organization

- Founded: 2010
- Founder: Saad Abid
- Headquarters: Casablanca, Morocco
- President: Saad Abid

Bahri Association is a Moroccan non-profit environmental organization founded in 2010.

== History and activities ==
Bahri Association was established in 2010 and began organizing beach clean-up and environmental awareness activities in Morocco. Between 2010 and 2015, it organized the ''Bahri Dima Clean'' campaign in several coastal areas.

In 2016, the association initiated the development of ''Chbyka'', a device for collecting small plastic waste from sand. The project was launched in 2022. In 2024, a campaign using the device was conducted across 20 beaches between Tangier and Laayoune. According to Hespress, 5,200 kilograms of waste were collected during the campaign, including 390 kilograms of microplastics, with approximately 1,800 participants.

In 2023, Bahri organized the Moroccan edition of Spogomi, a waste-collection competition originating in Japan. A Moroccan team subsequently participated in the Spogomi World Cup in Japan, finishing fifth among 24 teams.

Following the 2023 Al Haouz earthquake, the association organized ''Ne9i Bladi'', a clean-up campaign in affected areas.
