= Benadryl challenge =

Dangerous internet challenge

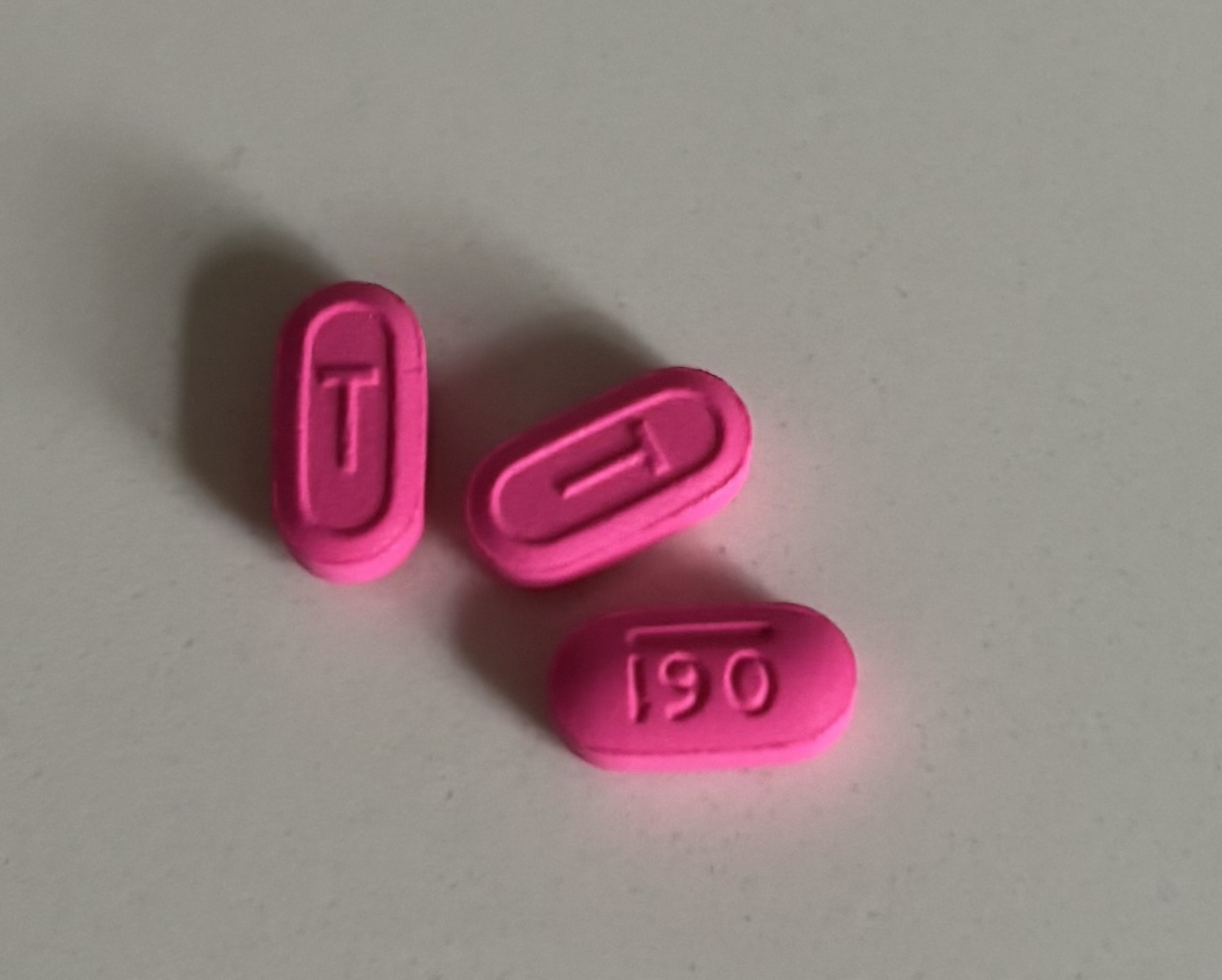
The recommended dosage of Benadryl tablets for adults and adolescents age 12 or older is 1 to 2 tablets every 4 to 6 hours, and only 1 tablet every 4 to 6 hours for children ages 6 to 11.

The Benadryl challenge is an internet challenge that emerged in 2020, revolving around the deliberate consumption, excessive use and overdose of the antihistamine medicine diphenhydramine (commonly sold in the United States under the brand name Benadryl), (Note: In other countries, products sold under the brand name Benadryl may contain a different antihistamine; in the United Kingdom, this is the second-generation antihistamines acrivastine or cetirizine.) which acts as a deliriant in high doses. The challenge, which reportedly spread via the social media platform TikTok, instructs participants to film themselves consuming large doses of Benadryl and documenting the effect of tripping or hallucinating.

The recreational use of diphenhydramine and addiction is well-reported in medical literature, and overdoses are treatable with correct intervention. Its psychoactive effects at high dosages, which are a symptom of anticholinergic poisoning, are also well documented. In severe cases, the overdose of diphenhydramine and other anticholinergic medicines can lead to a phenomenon referred to as an anticholinergic toxidrome, which can affect organ systems throughout the body, including the nervous system and cardiovascular system.

Numerous authorities have advised against the challenge, as deliberate overconsumption of diphenhydramine can lead to adverse effects, including confusion, delirium, psychosis, organ damage, hyperthermia, convulsions, coma, and death. On September 24, 2020, the FDA formally released a statement advising parents and medical practitioners to be aware of the challenge's prevalence and its risks. Toxicologists have noted that diphenhydramine has strong anticholinergic properties and that large quantities can trigger hallucinations, dangerous cardiac arrhythmias and seizures associated with anticholinergic toxidrome.

Several participants have been hospitalized as a result of the challenge, including three teenagers admitted to the Cook Children's Medical Center after consuming at least 14 diphenhydramine tablets, and a 15-year-old Oklahoman teen who died from an overdose after attempting to take part. TikTok said it had not seen such "content trend" but proceeded to block the search term to prevent copycats.

Attention towards the challenge was renewed in 2023 when Jacob Stevens, 13, a teenager from Columbus, Ohio, died after six days in intensive care. Stevens had his friends film him as he consumed over a dozen Benadryl tablets, and began convulsing shortly afterwards. Upon admission to an intensive care unit, it was found that he had suffered critical brain damage, and he died following six days of mechanical ventilation. TikTok expressed sympathy for the family and reiterated that this type of content is prohibited on the platform. Hashtags such as "Benadryl" and "BenadrylChallenge" have been disabled, and the challenge does not appear to be widespread. Although searching for "Benadryl" has been blocked since 2020, it can still result in suggestions such as "bena challenge" or "benary changle" and videos related to the original challenge.

Medical case reports and Poison Control Centers have since documented cases of recurring incidents involving youths intentionally consuming large amounts of diphenhydramine. Local news outlets in 2024 and 2025 have reported multiple additional attempts of teenagers who tried to recreate the challenge, leading to further worries from clinicians regarding the persistence of teens misusing high-dose diphenhydramine on social media.

== See also ==
- Consumption of Tide Pods
- Recreational use of dextromethorphan
- Milk crate challenge, a risky physical challenge that gained popularity on TikTok in 2021
- Blackout challenge
- Skullbreaker challenge
