= GloZell =

American YouTube personality (born 1972)

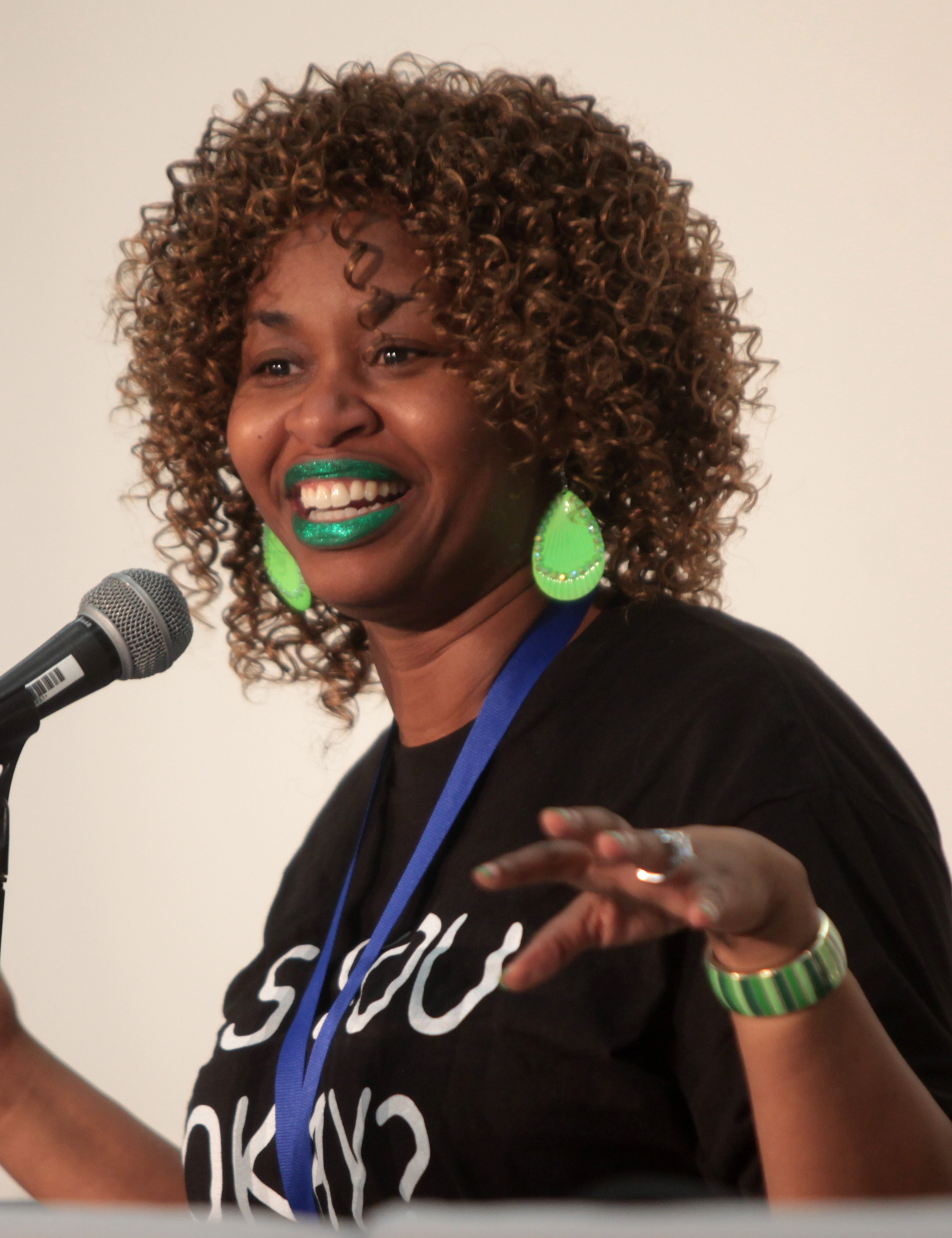
- GloZell in 2014
- Born: GloZell Lynette Green; July 30, 1972 (age 54); Orlando, Florida, U.S.
- Other name: GloZell Simon
- Education: University of Florida (BFA)
- Occupations: YouTube personality; stand-up comedian
- Years active: 2003–present
- Spouse: Kevin Simon (m. 2013; div. 2019)
- Children: 1

YouTube information
- Channel: GloZell1
- Genre: Comedy
- Subscribers: 4.51 million
- Views: 763 million
- Last updated: October 2026
- Website: glozell.com

GloZell Lynette Green (born July 30, 1972), better known mononymously as GloZell, is an American YouTube personality. GloZell established her YouTube channel in 2008, with video interviews, comedy about her life and song parodies. By 2015, the channel had accumulated more than four million subscribers and more than 700 million total views. Her most popular videos include her cinnamon challenge video, which has accumulated more than 60 million views, and "My Push up Bra will help me get my man" video, with more than 25 million views. She gained wide notice when her blog about meeting Elijah Wood was mentioned by the actor during a 2011 interview on Jimmy Kimmel Live!. In 2012, she appeared in the web series Dr. Fubalous.

In 2015, GloZell interviewed President Barack Obama in a YouTube livestream hosted at the White House. In 2018, Green had a small role as Little Debbie in Ralph Breaks the Internet.

In December 2020, it was announced that Green would be hosting "The GloZell Show" with Million Stories Media.

== Early life ==
GloZell was born to Gloria and Ozell Green, her name being a portmanteau of the names of her parents. She has one sister, DeOnzell, who is an opera singer. In 1997, GloZell graduated from the University of Florida with a BFA degree in musical theatre.

== Career ==
In 2003, GloZell moved to Hollywood, California, to pursue a career in acting and comedy. She joined The Groundlings and studied her favorite comedian, Jay Leno, by attending 600 consecutive tapings of The Tonight Show with Jay Leno. She began a blog that included a series of interviews with other audience members at Leno's show, but she soon began using YouTube as a video host for the interviews. She began to create and post original comedy videos when people she met at Leno tapings told her that she was funny on her own. Her first viral YouTube video, in 2008, was "My Push up Bra will help me get my man"; by 2013, it had gained over 20 million views. She began to make more frequent YouTube comedy videos focusing on her daily life, celebrity impersonations, song parodies, and Internet fads. Some of her most popular early videos were her "translations" of pop songs, such as Kesha's "Tik Tok" and Rihanna's "Rude Boy". On 22nd August 2009, uploaded her song, "Is that your breath or did you just fart?". In the original video, GloZell joked that it was dedicated to an elderly lady at the store, but after her daughter reacted to it in January 2025, she revealed she originally said this to her ex-husband, Kevin Simon, who can be seen sleeping in the background of the video.

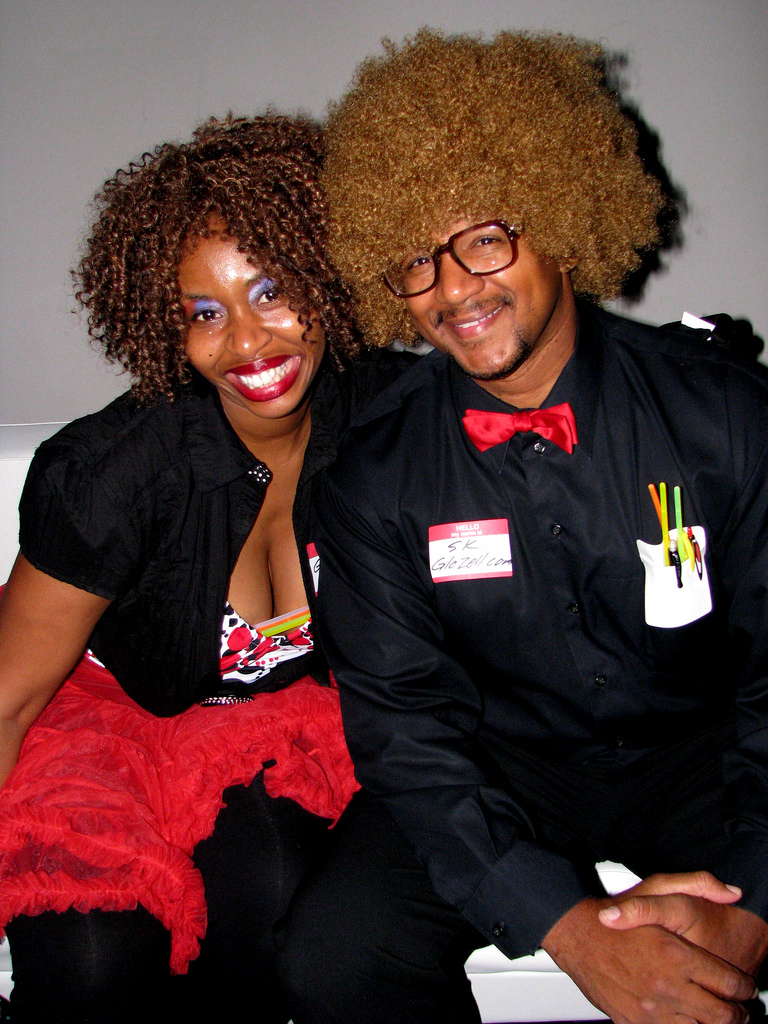
GloZell with her talent manager and then husband Kevin "SK" Simon, in 2009

In 2011, GloZell gained wider notice when her vlog about meeting Elijah Wood was mentioned by the actor during an interview on Jimmy Kimmel Live!. Her 2012 cinnamon challenge video became quickly popular and was ranked fourth on The Guardian's "Viral Video Chart" in February 2012. As of 2016, it had amassed more than 48 million views. In June 2012, she was featured in the video Beauty and the Beat by Todrick Hall, which reimagines the opening of Disney's Beauty and the Beast, in which Belle lives in an urban African-American neighborhood. Also 2012, GloZell was featured alongside Danny Trejo and Flavor Flav and fellow YouTube personalities Antoine Dodson and Colleen Ballinger in the musical web series Dr. Fubalous, where GloZell played the titular doctor's "ranch dressing-loving secretary", Maude "Ma" Cakes.

GloZell has performed her stand-up act at such comedy venues as The Comedy Store, The Improv, the Laugh Factory, Showtime at the Apollo, Steve Harvey Talent Show, and the J. Anthony Brown's J Spot Comedy Club. She has appeared on The Dr. Oz Show, 20/20, ABC News and MTV and has been featured in The Washington Post, the Los Angeles Times, U.S. News & World Report, Ebony, Cosmopolitan, People and Forbes magazines, among other media. Each year since 2013, GloZell has hosted a free live variety show called GloZell Fest, with celebrity and YouTube guests including Sisaundra Lewis, Meghan Tonjes, Frankie Grande, Miranda Sings and Far Young. She has also published a book of inspirational poems called Wait! Let Me Tell You.

In May 2013, GloZell released her first single, titled "Pick Up After Your Dog", on the iTunes Store, and the music video was soon released on YouTube. She released her second single, "Glozell's Cinnamon Challenge", later in May. By 2013, GloZell's YouTube channel had received more than 400 million total views, with 2.7 million subscribers, and was ranked the 25th most viewed comedy channel on YouTube. By 2015, the channel had accumulated more than 4 million subscribers and more than 700 million views.

On January 22, 2015 GloZell interviewed Barack Obama in a YouTube livestream hosted at The White House. She talked to him about, among other issues, racial profiling and officer-involved shootings, relations with Cuba and cybersecurity. At the end of the interview she handed Obama green lipstick to give to the first lady and their children, but misspoke saying, "One for your first wife…" resulting in some laughs from the audience in the room. GloZell made a guest appearance in the Nickelodeon sitcom Game Shakers and played a role in the 2015 film The Wedding Ringer. She plays the voice role of Grandma Rosiepuff in DreamWorks' animated film Trolls. She also has a docuseries, Glo All In, about her and her husband's quest to have a child, ultimately with a surrogate mother.

In June 2016, GloZell released an autobiography, Is You Okay?, written in collaboration with Nils Parker. In 2016, GloZell had a lead role as the Jazz Singer in the YouTube Red (now YouTube Premium) original series Escape the Night. The cast of the show, including her, Shane Dawson, Joey Graceffa, Lele Pons and Sierra Furtado, won the Streamy Award for best ensemble cast. In 2017, Green launched a new channel for preschoolers called GloBugz!, the series was produced by Bunim/Murray Productions.

In 2018, Green had a small role as Little Debbie in Ralph Breaks the Internet.

In 2025, GloZell was featured on Season 29 of Worst Cooks in America, eliminated in the fourth episode.

== Personal life ==
On August 9, 2013, GloZell married her manager, Kevin Simon. On August 4, 2016, they had a daughter, O'Zell Gloriana De Green Simon, via surrogacy. In 2020, GloZell announced that she had divorced Simon.
