= Fire challenge =

Internet challenge

Glass cleaner burning in a performer's bare hand

The fire challenge is an internet challenge which involves applying flammable liquids to one's body and then setting the liquids aflame, while being video recorded; the footage is then posted to social media sites. Firefighters, police officers and media sources have criticized and spoken out against the activity, hoping to dissuade individuals from trying it due to its harmful nature.

The first known fire challenge video was uploaded in 2012. The activity gained mainstream media attention in 2014.

== Effect ==
Immediate first through second degree burns are the direct results of undergoing the activity. One teenager from Kentucky who participated in the challenge described the subsequent pain as "unbearable."

In addition to the obvious dangers, many participants run away in panic without dousing the flames first, allowing the oxygen to cause the flames to spread more easily. Another immediate danger is the participants inhaling superheated air, which can then damage the lungs.

== Reactions ==
Writing for The Huffington Post, in response to viewing a video of a youth attempting the challenge, Andres Jauregui stated on the behalf of his coworkers:

"We're basically speechless. We hang out with guys who eat lightbulbs, and we're still shocked. Granted, those guys are trained professional performers, where as [sic] this appears to be a misguided youth. The scariest part is that he's not the only person who is doing this."

Writing for The Washington Post, Caitlin Dewey noted "YouTube has known its fair share of dangerous, destructive and ill-advised trends, but even by those standards, the 'fire challenge' hits new lows."

Multiple local and state fire departments have spoken out against the fire challenge, often citing the significant harm and the unpredictability of fire for their reasoning.
