= Little Drummer Boy Challenge =

Informal internet challenge

The Little Drummer Boy Challenge, styled LDBC, is an informal internet competition in the United States to avoid hearing any version of the song "The Little Drummer Boy" for the duration of the Christmas and holiday season shopping period beginning at 12:01 am on the day after Thanksgiving, and extending until December 24, Christmas Eve. The original game was created by a group of friends at a software company in Berkeley, California, in the mid-1990s. Variations include competitive elements and alternative starting and ending dates. The game has been placed in a genre referred to by one writer as "tests of obliviousness."

== History ==
A version of the game to avoid "The Little Drummer Boy" during the holidays has been around since the mid-1990s. Michael Alan Peck launched the LDBC specifically after friends began to play it among themselves. The game's growing appeal, which has been increasing since 2011, has been attributed to a response to the perceived increase in holiday music played in retail spaces.

Participants have, since 2014, been able to post "elfies" to the official Facebook page showing their horror when they hear the song and lose. As of 2018, some 10,000 people have either liked or followed the contest page on Facebook. Peck asserts he does not hate the song (while the originators of the game do), but that it is an ideal challenge for holiday song avoidance as "you hear it a lot, but not so much that the game is impossible." Peck also considers it "really weird" that the story is based on the notion that an appropriate gift to a newborn is someone banging on a drum.

To support players, Peck in 2018 published a list of "toxic media" which has caused others in the past to lose the game. Nevertheless, only 28% of players reported winning in 2017. The version by Bing Crosby and David Bowie disqualifies the most players, according to statistics Peck has collected.

== Rules ==
Participation is automatic, although reporting of losses and wins is voluntary. Winning requires not hearing even a snippet of "The Little Drummer Boy" between Black Friday and Christmas Eve inclusive, the only exception being that being deliberately ambushed by someone singing or playing the song results in a loss for the offender, not the victim. On the other hand, as of 2017 players may not harass musicians in advance to keep them from playing the song. Parodies of the song, as of 2018, will also cause elimination per the "blurred lines rule."

Some players go about in public wearing headphones to tune out holiday music which might trip them up.

== Variants ==
There are other versions of games for which avoiding "The Little Drummer Boy" is central, some of which likely predate the version advanced by Peck. The most significant difference is the start and end dates; in one version, for example, the game begins when Christmas music is first played in stores.

== See also ==
- Whamageddon, a similar challenge using the song "Last Christmas" by Wham!
