= Postinflammatory hypopigmentation =

- Specialty: Dermatology

Postinflammatory hypopigmentation is a cutaneous condition characterized by decreased pigment in the skin following inflammation of the skin.

== Signs and symptoms ==
Hypopigmented lesions can range in color from hypopigmentation to depigmentation, and their size, form, and primary inflammatory dermatosis frequently correspond with each other. Complete depigmentation is more noticeable in people with darker skin and is frequently observed in cases of discoid lupus erythematosus and severe atopic dermatitis. When pigmentary alterations occur with the initial inflammatory lesions, the diagnosis is often easy to make. Hypopigmentation, however, may be the only characteristic in certain situations, in which the inflammatory phase is not always evident. Little white macules that resemble the size and form of the laser spot are indicative of pigmentary changes brought on by pigment-specific lasers.

== Causes ==
Postinflammatory hypopigmentation is a common consequence of cutaneous inflammatory disorders. Certain conditions, like lichen striatus (LS) and pityriasis lichenoides chronica (PLC), typically cause postinflammatory hypopigmentation as opposed to hyperpigmentation. Postinflammatory hypopigmentation can also result after cutaneous injuries caused by burns, irritants, and dermatological operations (such as chemical peels, dermabrasion, cryotherapy, and laser therapy).

Atopic dermatitis (AD) patients may exhibit postinflammatory hypopigmentation. Strong topical corticosteroids cause more frequent and severe pigmentary alterations. Severe atopic dermatitis has been linked to depigmentation resembling vitiligo.

With a prevalence of up to 59%, lichen striatus is another frequent cause of postinflammatory hypopigmentation. Within two years, the dermatosis spontaneously heals, leaving temporary hypopigmentation, particularly in those with darker skin tones. Furthermore, the inflammatory phase can not be noticeable, leaving hypopigmentation as the only characteristic.

Pityriasis lichenoides chronica frequently manifests as diffuse hypopigmentation with a small number of scaly papular lesions in patients with dark skin.

Changes in pigmentation frequently occur following thermal burns and freezing. Postinflammatory hyperpigmentation is prevalent in minor burns, but postinflammatory hypopigmentation can occur in severe burns.

In addition, postinflammatory hypopigmentation is another potential side effect of chemical peels. In the past, porcelain-white (alabaster) skin was thought to benefit from the use of Baker phenol peel.

Hypopigmentation following laser resurfacing is frequently observed, and it may result in permanent changes that are proportional to the depth of resurfacing. It normally happens three to ten months following the surgery.

== Diagnosis ==
Examining a lesion under a wood lamp highlights it and makes it easier to distinguish between lesions that are hypopigmented and those that are depigmented. It could also be beneficial to rule out certain conditions. Different hypomelanotic conditions can be distinguished using confocal laser scanning microscopy based on patterns of distribution and melanin content. Melanophages are not seen in vitiligo or naevus depigmentosus, but they have been detected in postinflammatory hypopigmentation. However, the degree of inflammation affects both the melanin and dermal papillary ring contents.

The histopathology of postinflammatory hypopigmentation reveals generic features such as the presence of melanophages in the upper dermis, varying degrees of superficial lymphohistiocytic infiltration, and decreased epidermal melanin.

== Treatment ==
The identification of the problem is the most crucial step in management. Usually, if the underlying reason is successfully addressed, the hypopigmentation gradually becomes better. Cosmetic and dermatological operations should be properly executed to prevent iatrogenic hypopigmentation, particularly in high-risk patients.

Postinflammatory hypopigmentation has been treated by twice-daily administration of a medium-potency topical steroid combined with a tar-based preparation, albeit the mechanisms underlying this are still poorly understood.

An open-label pilot study found that topical pimecrolimus cream helped dark-skinned patients with postinflammatory hypopigmentation related to seborrheic dermatitis.

When functional melanocytes are present in the damaged area, sun or ultraviolet (UV) exposure may aid in repigmentation; however, excessive exposure may intensify the color contrast by tanning the surrounding skin. The restoration of pigment may be aided by topical application of 0.1% 8-methoxypsoralen, 0.5–1% coal tar, or anthralin, followed by sun exposure. With good outcomes, different topical photochemotherapy regimens (topical psoralen UVA; PUVA) have been utilized to treat postinflammatory hypopigmentation brought on by a variety of illnesses.

With nine biweekly treatments, the 308-nm excimer laser showed a response rate of 60–70% for pigmentation stimulation in hypopigmented scars. To preserve the effects, though, a follow-up treatment is required every 1-4 months.

Melanocyte or epidermal grafting may be considered in cases of depigmented lesions exhibiting complete loss of melanocytes.

== Outlook ==
While mild hypopigmentation normally goes away in a few weeks, severe hypopigmentation and depigmentation brought on by scleroderma, burns, or lupus erythematosus can take years to repigment and may even be permanent.

== Epidemiology ==
Postinflammatory hypopigmentation is a highly prevalent pigmentary disease. It can happen to any type of skin. Nonetheless, individuals with darker skin seem to have it more frequently and visibly, perhaps due to the color contrast with their natural skin. The incidence of postinflammatory hypopigmentation is the same for both sexes.

== See also ==
- Skin lesion
