= Internet challenge =

Popular phenomenon on the Internet

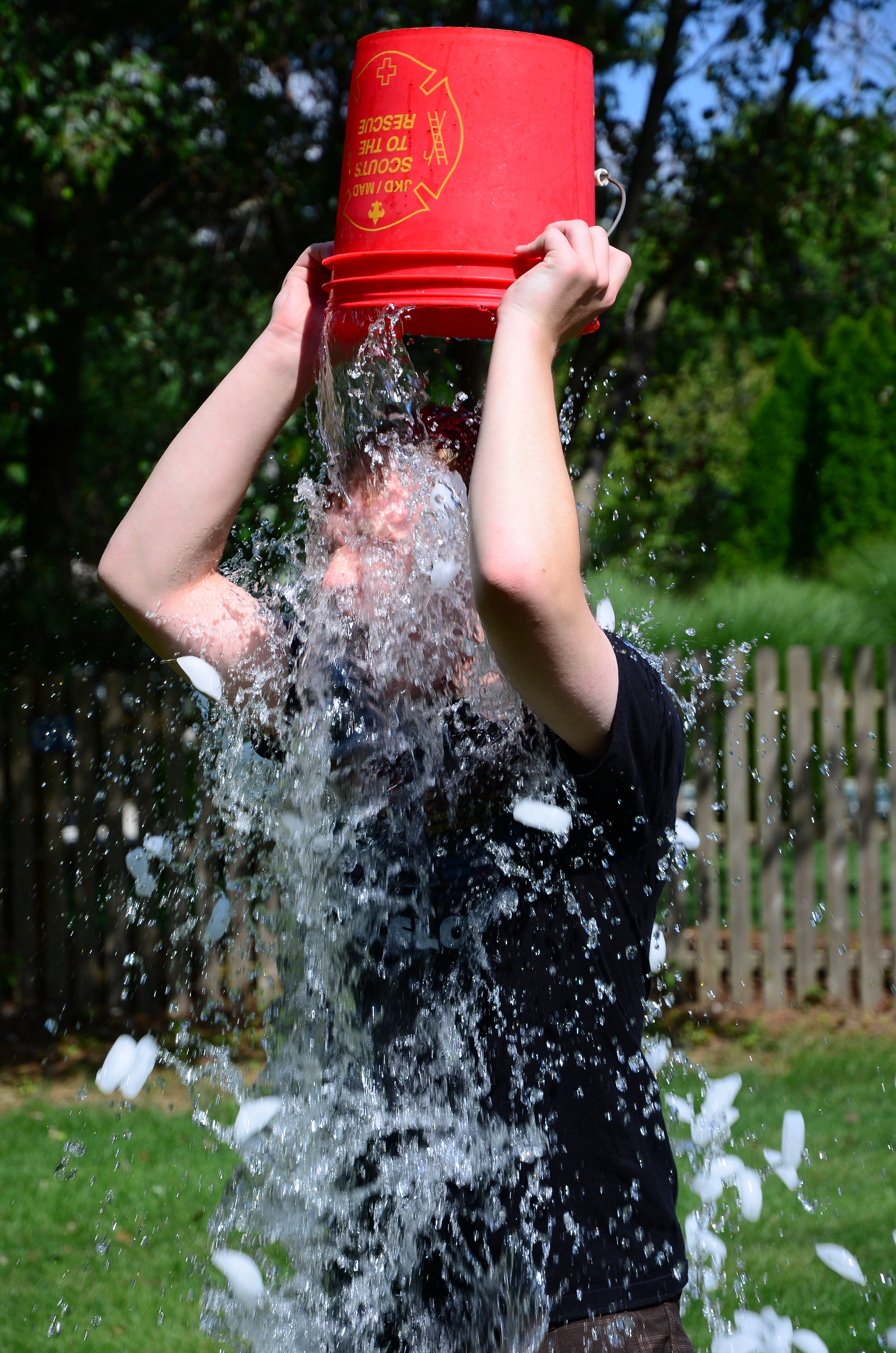
A person performing the ALS Ice Bucket Challenge

Internet challenges are a popular phenomenon on the Internet, encompassing a wide range of videos in which individuals record themselves performing specific actions or tasks, often daring others to do the same. These challenges have become a significant part of Internet meme culture, with many of them gaining widespread attention and popularity through memes. Notable examples of such challenges include the ALS Ice Bucket challenge, which gained viral status in mid-2014, and the TrashTag Challenge, which became popular in 2019.

The concept of Internet challenges shares similarities with the classic dare games played by children, wherein participants dare each other to undertake actions that are typically unconventional or out of the ordinary. While some challenges have emerged solely within the digital realm, there are instances where challenges or tasks predate the Internet and have resurfaced in a modified form online. The allure of internet challenges can be attributed, in part, to individuals' desire for attention and social validation, particularly among teenagers. Several of these challenges carry inherent risks and can be potentially dangerous.

Controversy has surrounded Internet challenges, primarily due to the harmful nature of certain tasks. The Cinnamon challenge and the Tide Pod challenge are examples where participants have suffered severe injuries or even died. In response to such dangers, platforms such as YouTube have disallowed the promotion of these challenges, leading many individuals to turn to alternative platforms such as TikTok, where the creation and dissemination of such challenges are not subjected to strict moderation.

Moreover, some challenges have drawn criticism for their rude or disrespectful nature. The Gallon Smashing Internet challenge, for instance, gained notoriety for encouraging participants to purposefully spill or smash gallon containers of liquid in public places, resulting in inconvenience and potential harm to others.
