= Whamageddon =

Christmas season game

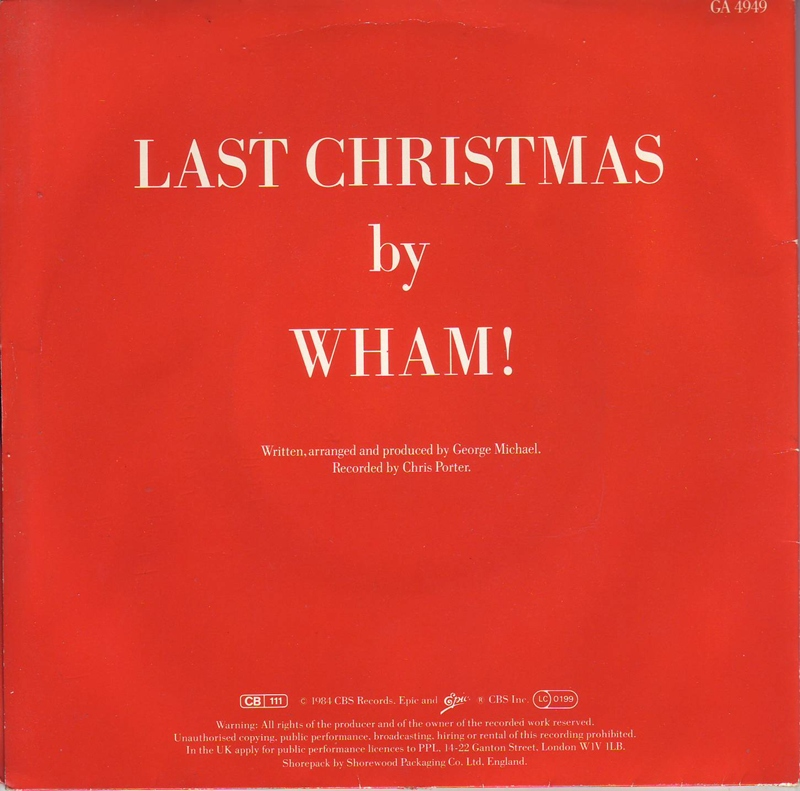
- Back cover of original 1984 UK gatefold edition of "Last Christmas"
- Years active: 2010–present
- Playing time: 1 December – 24 December
- Chance: Partially
- Skills: Strategy

Whamageddon is a game played during the 24 days before Christmas in which players try to go from 1 December to the end of Christmas Eve (24 December) without hearing the original version of "Last Christmas" by British pop duo Wham!. Based on the Little Drummer Boy Challenge from the mid-1990s, if the player hears the record between those days, they are out of the game and have to post "#Whamageddon" on social media to indicate that they have lost. Hearing other recordings of "Last Christmas" does not constitute a loss.

Whamageddon is described as a survival game, as opposed to a battle royale game. Intentionally attempting to force participants to lose by playing the song in their presence or sending them the song (in the same manner as rickrolling) is strongly discouraged but not against the rules of the game.

== History and background ==
"Last Christmas" has been a staple of most all-Christmas radio stations' playlists since the format became popular; in 2023, the song was the most heavily played song on North American adult contemporary stations that had adopted all-Christmas formats (adult contemporary itself being the most common format to flip to all-Christmas, along with contemporary Christian music stations). The song has generally been rotated more heavily later in the season, since most stations tend to favour older standards earlier in the season; "Last Christmas" was among the least popular "first songs" to launch all-Christmas formats in 2024, with no stations choosing it. In George Michael's home country the United Kingdom, "Last Christmas" has reached the top two on the Christmas singles chart every year since 2022.

One of the earliest documented references of Whamageddon appeared on Maniac-Forum.de in November 2009, an online forum originally linked to German-language video game magazine M! Games. In 2010, GTPlanet, a sim racing-themed online forum, started a similar challenge under the name "GTPlanet vs. Wham! - Last Christmas". The rules were nearly the same, apart from the game having no defined start date and ending at midnight on 31 December, and the presence of the song within the discussion thread itself being prohibited.

In December 2023, the DJ at Sixfields Stadium in Northampton, England, played "Last Christmas" to a crowd of over 7,000 people, with the intention of making everyone present lose the Whamageddon game. He later apologised, after facing criticism.

== Gameplay ==
Rules from a purported "official" Whamageddon website:

- The player must go as long as possible without hearing Wham!'s Christmas song, "Last Christmas"
- The game starts on 1 December and ends at the end of 24 December
- Only the original version of "Last Christmas" applies, the player can listen to remixes and covers of the song
- The player is out as soon as they recognise the original version of the song
- The player may post "#Whamageddon" on social media as soon as they lose the game
- Players can play "player vs player" if they wish, by deliberately playing the song to friends to get them out of the game, although it is not encouraged

Once a player has lost they are sent to 'Whamhalla', from whence they are unable to return until the game begins again the next year.

== Alternative variations ==
Other variations of Whamageddon exist. In one variation called Wham!Hunter, players get a point each time they hear the song. This allows enjoyment of Christmas music and not having to worry when walking through a shopping centre or when the radio is playing in the car. Radio industry Web site RadioInsight defined Whamageddon as starting on November 1, the traditional launch date for the earliest adopters of the all-Christmas music radio format.

== See also ==
- The Game (mind game) – Mental thought-suppression game
- Little Drummer Boy Challenge – Informal internet challenge
