= SpoGomi =

Japanese litter collecting sport

Sport Gomihiroi (スポゴミ拾い), lit. 'sport picking up trash', abbreviated to SpoGomi, is a sport invented in Japan in which teams collect garbage and litter with in a time limit and specified area. Invented in 2008, the first SpoGomi World Cup was held in Japan in November 2023; it was won by Great Britain. The second SpoGomi World Cup was held in October 2025 and was won by Japan with Germany as runner up.

== Rules ==
SpoGomi involves teams of three players collecting items of rubbish within a designated playing area. The teams have one hour to pick up any rubbish found in the area, and 20 minutes to correctly sort the rubbish. Teammates cannot be more than 10 metres apart from each other, and are not allowed to run. Points are rewarded for both the amount of waste collected by the teams, and what kind of waste is collected. For example, cigarette butts are the highest-scoring items.

Teams are not allowed to collect waste that is already in bins or rubblish collection points or belongs to someone else. Teams are also not allowed to collect bulky items that cannot fit into the trash bags provided; hazardous waste; or trash picked up by lifting road gutters and dovetails. They are also not allowed to enter rivers, oceans or private property. Teams which break the rules may be cautioned, deducted points or disqualified. Grounds for points deduction include incorrect sorting of items, picking up prohibited items, or failure to return within ten minutes after completing the trash pick-up. Teams may be disqualified if they are over ten minutes late after time has ended, travel by any method other than walking, adding weight to their trash bags with items other than fallen trash, bad sportsmanship, or repeated rule violations.

== Culture ==
An anime film entitled SpoGomi: World Cup Exhibition Match Arc has been made to promote the sport. The anime is a coming-of-age story set in a near-future world where SpoGomi is a sport as popular as soccer.

=== Malaysia ===
SpoGomi was introduced in Malaysia through local organizers including Kazuki Foo, who helped promote the sport as part of environmental sustainability initiatives.

The Malaysia stage of the 2025 event was supported by the Brewspark Technologies Group.

== See also ==
- Plogging
- TrashTag
