= Devious lick =

2021 TikTok trend promoting vandalism and theft

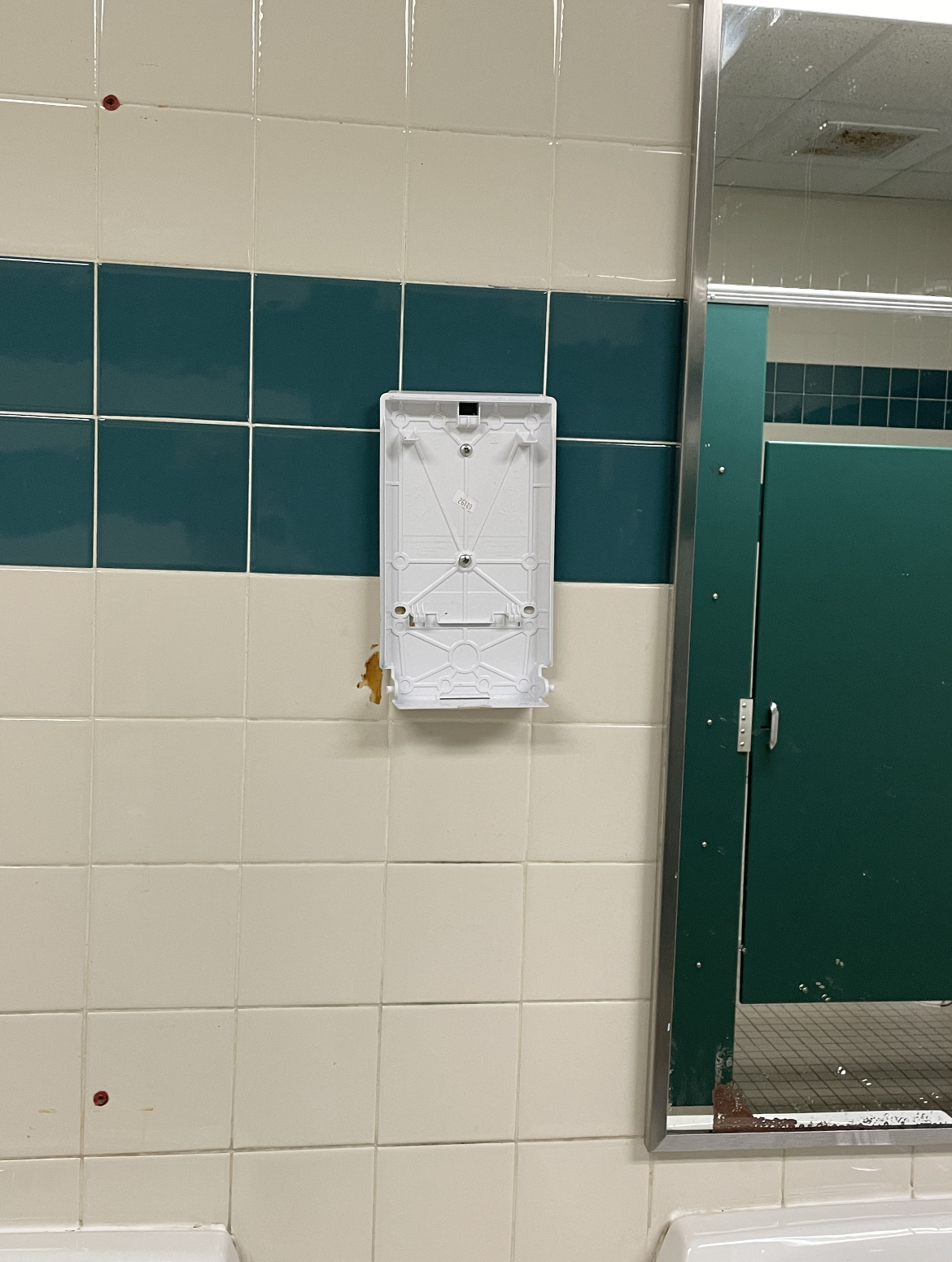
Missing soap dispenser at a Texas public school on September 20, 2021, as a result of a "devious lick"

The devious lick (Note: According to Urban Dictionary, the word lick is defined as a theft that results in "an acceptable, impressive and rewarding payday".) (also known as a diabolical lick, dastardly lick, or nefarious lick, among other names) was a social media trend in which middle- and high-school students posted videos of themselves stealing, vandalizing, or displaying items they stole from their school, typically from a bathroom (or, in some cases, merely pretending to have done so). The trend went viral on TikTok in 2021 and resulted in the arrests of several students, as well as warnings issued by police departments. It was reported in schools in Canada, Australia, the United States, and Germany.

== History ==
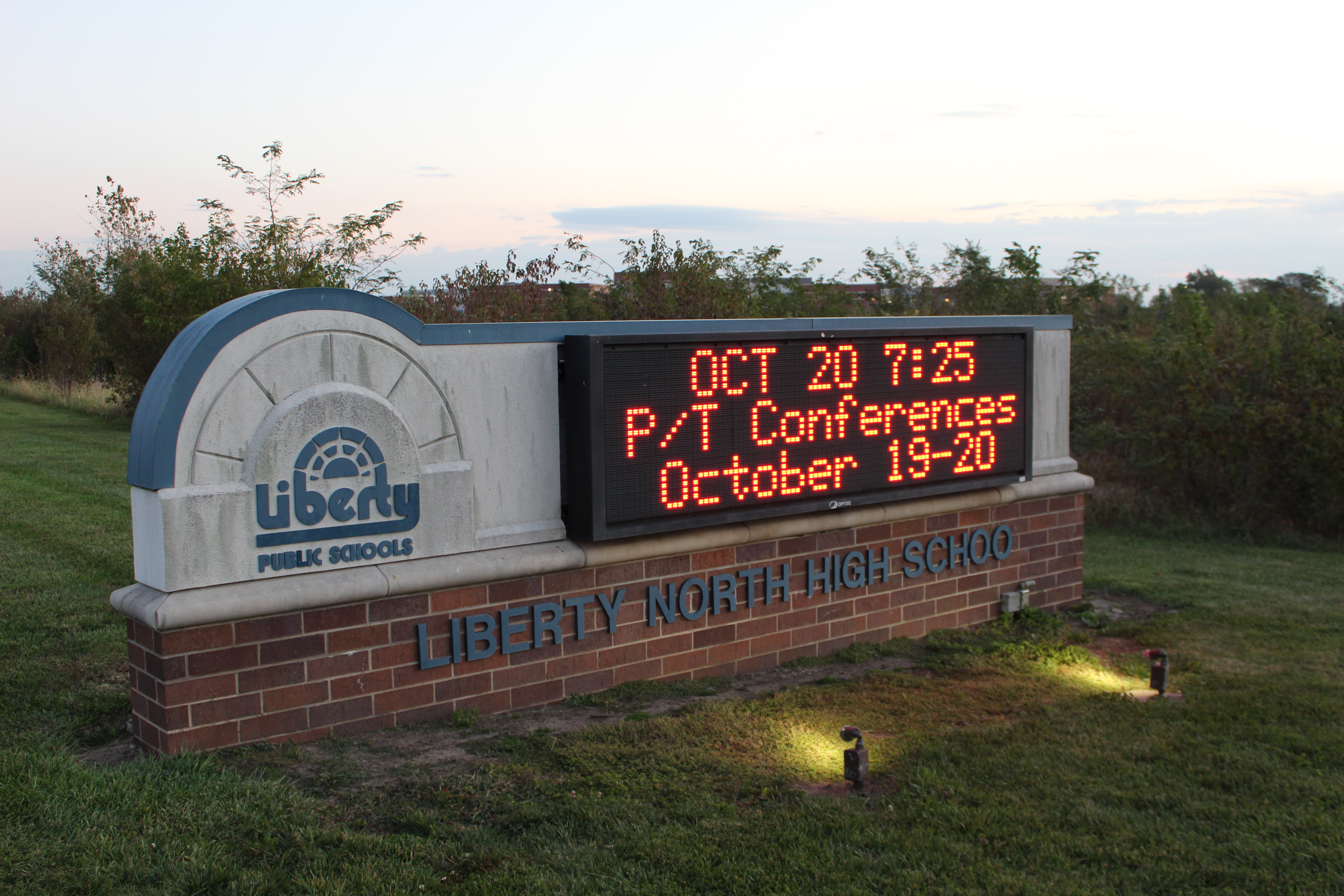
Liberty North High School's front sign after being vandalized by a "devious lick", with the 'L' in "school" having been stolen

The trend originated on September 1, 2021, after the TikTok user jugg4elias posted a video showing a box of disposable masks they claimed to have stolen from school, with the caption "A month into school... devious lick". Similar videos with the term "devious lick" soon flooded the platform, with students stealing items from bathrooms, such as soap and paper towel dispensers, toilet paper roll shields, urinals, sinks, mirrors, and floor and ceiling tiles. Students also allegedly stole items outside of the bathrooms, including exit signs, telephones, interactive whiteboards, and microscopes. The videos were typically accompanied by a sped-up version of Lil B's "Ski Ski BasedGod". The videos' captions often modify the name of the trend with synonymous adjectives, referring to "mischievous" or "diabolical" licks.

Various schools began taking action against the trend, warning students of serious consequences and arrests. In British Columbia, students ripped out 42 soap dispensers from school bathrooms within the span of one week. In Huron County, Ontario, a bathroom had all of its urinals and toilets clogged with paper towels, while other toilet paper was ripped out and thrown to the ground.

More serious vandalism attributed to the trend involved broken mirrors and light fixtures. In Polk County, Florida, three students were arrested from two high schools, as well as one 15-year-old who was arrested for damaging and stealing soap dispensers at Bartow High School. In Boone County, Kentucky, eight students were charged over the trend, with four receiving theft and four receiving vandalism charges. In Stafford County, Virginia, a student from Stafford Senior High School was charged for vandalizing a park bathroom near the school. In Mohave County, Arizona, a 15-year-old was arrested for stealing a school toilet paper dispenser.

A similar trend emerged in May 2025, which was dubbed the "Chromebook Challenge", this challenge involved mainly vandalism of school-issued Chromebooks by inserting conductive materials such as pencil leads or paper clips into the USB ports, starting fires.

== Reactions ==
=== Platform response ===
The original devious lick video was removed on September 13, and TikTok subsequently began removing videos featuring the trend. It was banned by TikTok on September 15 for violating its community guidelines against illegal activities, by which time the "devious" hashtag had over 235 million views. The hashtag and related search results were redirected to an error message about TikTok's Community Guidelines.

=== Media response ===
In addition to schools and the police, various media commentators condemned the trend.

Journalist Brock Colyar of Curbed claimed that three separate videos of supposed "devious licks" were, in fact, all staged, with one video of a student supposedly stealing a microscope actually being of a microscope the student owned at home, and critiqued the media and political response as a moral panic.

=== Propaganda use ===
In March 2022, The Washington Post reported that Facebook's owner, Meta Platforms paid Targeted Victory—a consulting firm backed by supporters of the U.S. Republican Party—to coordinate lobbying and media campaigns against TikTok, without disclosing a connection to Meta. Its efforts included recruiting local reporters to publish stories, writing letters to the editor and opinion pieces in the name of concerned parents, and drawing attention to trends such as "devious licks" and "Slap a Teacher".

=== Countertrend ===
After the media backlash and crackdown on devious licks, some TikTok users began participating in a countertrend known as "angelic yields", where users anonymously donated items to their schools, such as bottles of soap and rolls of toilet paper, typically to replace whatever had been stolen during a devious lick, or to hide a gift for someone to find, often in the form of a small amount of cash.

== See also ==
- Censorship of TikTok
- Milk crate challenge, a risky physical challenge that also gained popularity on TikTok in 2021
