= Cinnamon challenge =

Viral internet food challenge

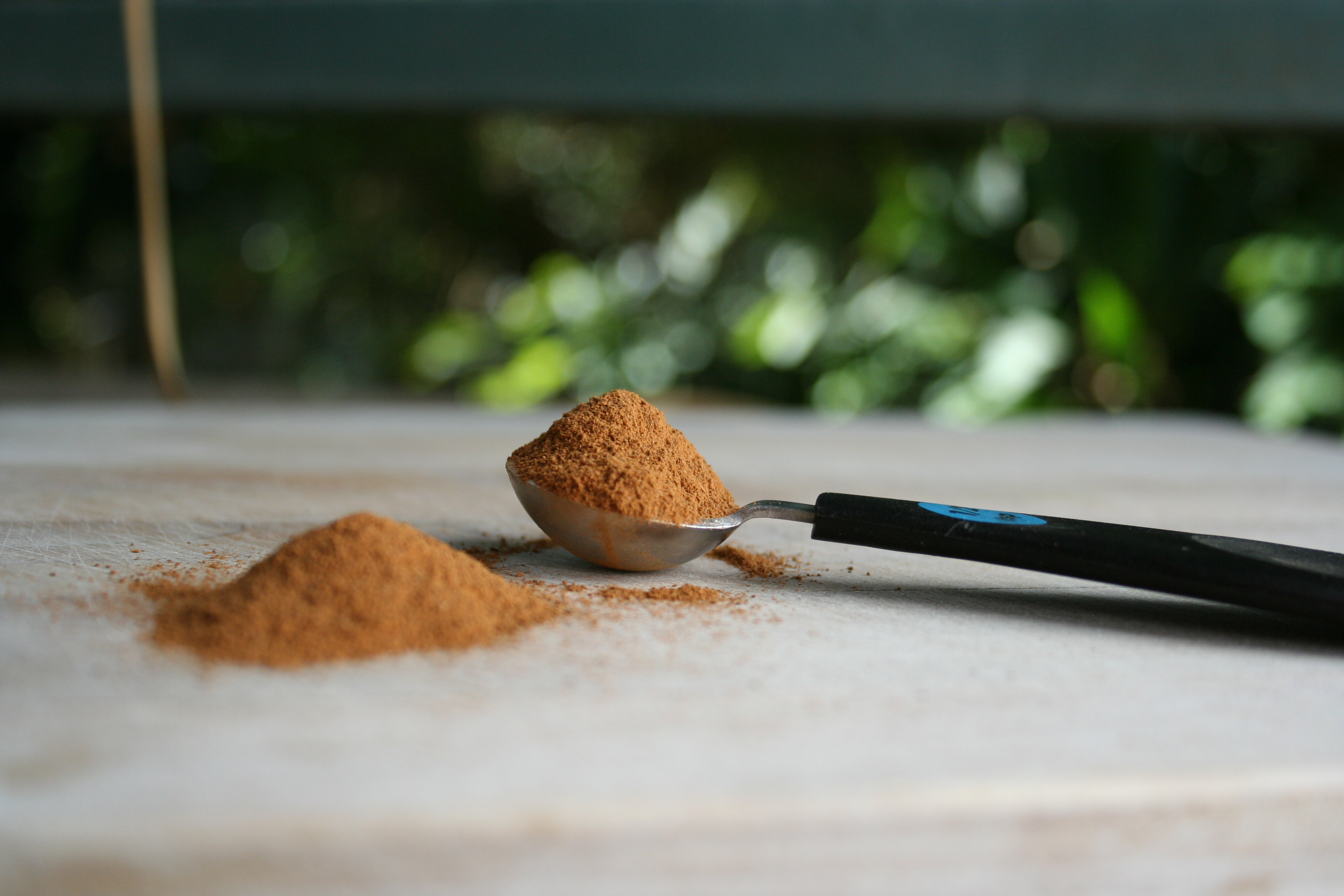
The cinnamon challenge involves consuming one spoonful of powdered cinnamon.

The cinnamon challenge is a food challenge that gained viral recognition on social media in the early 2010s. For the challenge, participants film themselves attempting to eat a spoonful (typically a tablespoon) of ground cinnamon in under 60 seconds without drinking anything. The challenge is difficult and carries substantial health risks because the cinnamon can coat and dry the mouth and throat, possibly resulting in coughing, gagging, vomiting, and inhalation of cinnamon, which can in turn lead to throat irritation, breathing difficulties, and risk of pneumonia or a collapsed lung.

The challenge has been described online since 2001, and increased in popularity in 2007, peaking abruptly in January 2012 and falling off almost as sharply through the first half of that year, then tapering off almost to its previous level by 2014. By 2010, many people had posted videos of themselves attempting this challenge on YouTube and other social networking websites. At the height of its popularity, the challenge was mentioned on Twitter nearly 70,000 times per day.

== Health dangers ==
The stunt can be dangerous, as there is a risk of gagging or choking on the cinnamon, especially if it forms a clump and clogs one's airways. Accidental inhalation of cinnamon can seriously damage the lungs by causing inflammation and leading to infection. The usual result of this stunt is "a coughing, gagging fit involving clouds of cinnamon" which "leaves some people gasping for air". Sometimes those performing the stunt may gag, choke or cough and accidentally exhale the cinnamon through their noses, coating their skin and mucous membranes in cinnamon. As cinnamon is rich in the compound cinnamaldehyde that can irritate skin and tissues, the challenge often results in considerable irritation, discomfort, burning, or itching of the affected nasal tissue and nostrils. Preclinical studies in rats have shown that the cellulose fibers which comprise cinnamon are also responsible for triggering allergic hypersensitivity reactions. On YouTube, people have been seen "coughing, choking and lunging for water, usually as friends watch and laugh." Vomiting is also known to have occurred.

Cinnamon contains the chemical coumarin, which is moderately toxic to the liver and kidney if ingested in large amounts.

The cinnamon challenge can be life-threatening or fatal. In the first three months of 2012, American poison control centers received over a hundred phone calls as a result of the cinnamon challenge. A teenager in Michigan spent four days in a hospital after attempting the cinnamon challenge. Pneumonia, inflammation and scarring of the lungs, and collapsed lungs are further risks.

== In popular culture ==
The cinnamon challenge was aired on the twelfth series of the reality television show Big Brother UK, in which show participants were to ingest ground cinnamon without the aid of water. Radio programs have also aired segments of people performing this stunt, and others in the public limelight have been reported as airing the stunt for public display, including NBA players Nick Young and JaVale McGee.

An excerpt from a cinnamon challenge video

Many people upload their cinnamon challenges to YouTube. Comedian Colleen Ballinger told The Wall Street Journal that she took the challenge in character as Miranda Sings in 2012 in order to increase her YouTube traffic after hundreds of her fans had asked her to take the challenge. Her video received more than 2 million views, even though it is on a discontinued YouTube channel. Another comedian, GloZell Green, has attracted more than 60 million views with her cinnamon challenge video, in which she uses a soup ladle full of cinnamon instead of the usual tablespoon.

A large group attempt at the cinnamon challenge was held in 2012 at RMIT University in Australia and involved 64 participants in quick succession. In a 2012 episode of the Discovery Channel series MythBusters, each member of the Build Team attempted the challenge with a tablespoon. Kari Byron and Grant Imahara failed, while Tory Belleci completed it by tucking his spoonful into his cheek and letting saliva accumulate in his mouth until he could swallow. However, it took him more than 60 seconds to do so.

== See also ==
- Banana Sprite challenge
- Gallon challenge
- Saltine cracker challenge
- Salt and ice challenge
- Consumption of Tide Pods
