= Food challenge =

Type of challenge involving eating large amounts of food

Food challenges, such as the gallon challenge or the saltine cracker challenge, are specific challenges or competitions involving food. Milk chugging is a popular competitive eating challenge on college campuses, and was promoted by MTV's Jackass in the early 2000s via their various food skits. Some challenges involve eating foods that may be considered disgusting by those taking the challenge.

With the rise of the Internet, Internet phenomena have increasingly spread through chain emails, YouTube, and social media, encouraging people to "challenge" their friends by spreading the message to others, as well as creating viral Internet memes.

Some "challenges" on the internet can seriously harm participants. The cinnamon challenge, a dare to attempt to eat a specified amount of ground cinnamon within a minute, has a strong risk of people gagging on cinnamon inhaled into the lungs. In July 2015, a four-year-old boy died of asphyxiation after accidentally inhaling some cinnamon.

== See also ==
- List of Internet phenomena § Challenges
