= Saltine cracker challenge =

Food challenge

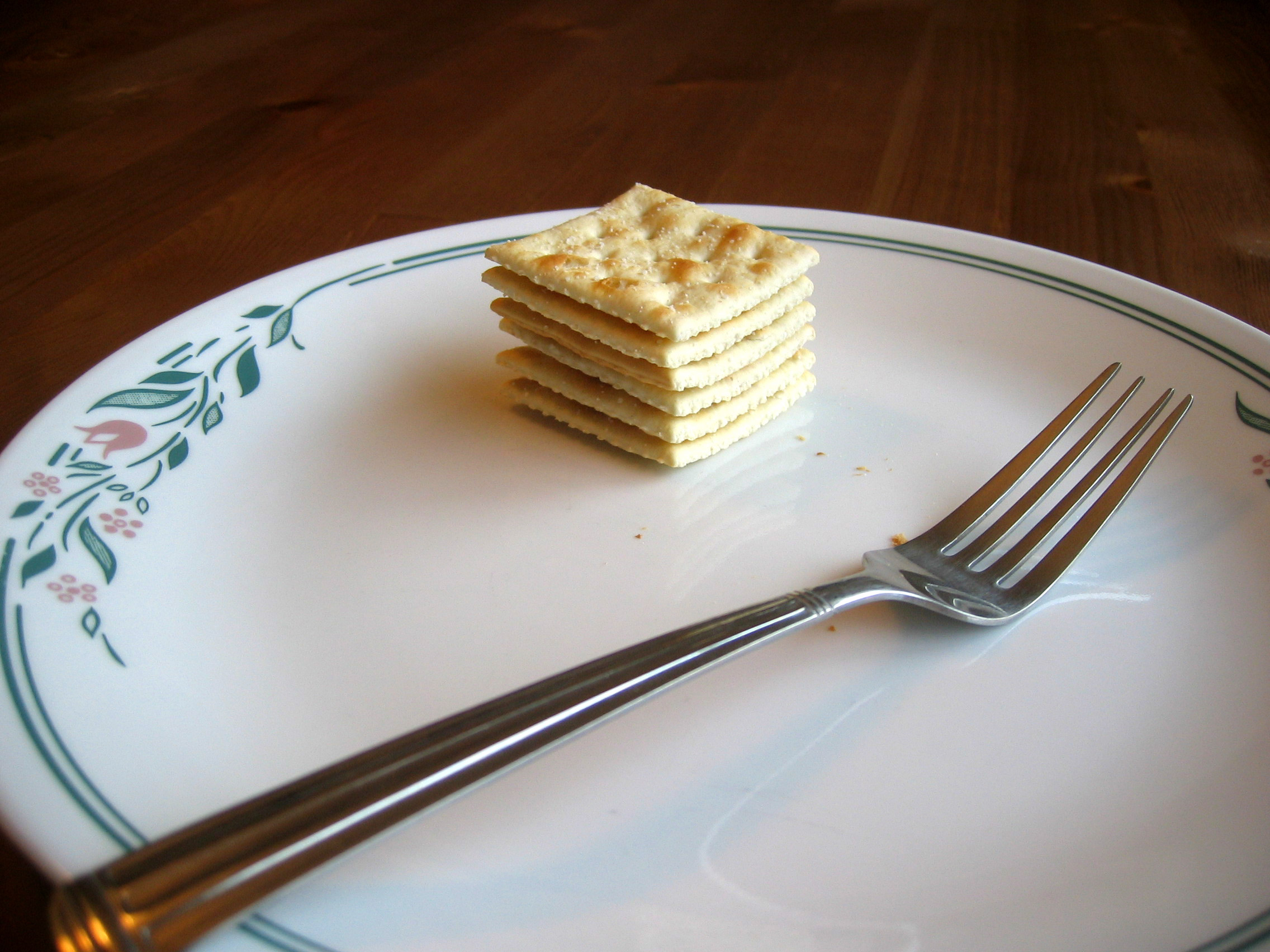
Six Nabisco brand saltines, each measuring 5 cm (2 in) square

The saltine cracker challenge or saltine challenge is a food challenge or competition in which a person has 60 seconds in which to eat six saltine soda crackers without drinking anything.

Although the challenge may sound trivial, it is difficult because the crackers quickly exhaust the saliva in the mouth. Even though six saltines can fit in one's mouth at the same time, and a minute is plenty of time to chew, the resulting mass of crumbs is still difficult to swallow with a dry mouth.

== The individual challenge ==
The challenge is generally given as eating six saltines in a single minute, although the target is sometimes set at five or seven. Most people are able to eat at least two saltines without water, although patients affected by Sjögren's syndrome lack the saliva necessary for even this many. Doctors may use this test, the "cracker test" or "cracker sign", to help diagnose the disorder.

A 1996 AP story used the challenge to illustrate the competitive nature and persistence of the Tennessee Volunteers' quarterback at the time, Peyton Manning. Having been bet that he could not eat six saltines, Manning attempted them one by one and failed; trying again, he stacked them on top of each other and succeeded. His roommate concluded, "Even something that was a joke, he was out to prove he can do it. He can eat six saltine crackers, and he did. He works out techniques he can do on everything." Before the 2001–2002 season, Penn State Lady Lions basketball coach Rene Portland's cracker-eating ability helped her land star players Tanisha Wright and Jessica Calamusso. During a recruiting trip, the high schoolers' Amateur Athletic Union coach mentioned the cracker challenge; Wright failed but Portland succeeded. Portland did not reveal her technique, but she did comment on the competitive drive: "Obviously, there's a competitor in an old coach to say that 'I can do this.' If I can do childbirth three times, six crackers can't be that hard." Other athletes connected with the challenge include baseball coach Brad Fischer and Derek Jeter; a photographer challenged by Jeter observed, "Being competitive has become his way to relax."

The challenge has been televised on morning news talk shows. In a 2001 The Early Show episode, Tom Bergeron took a bet that he could not eat four saltines in a minute, and after attempting them all at once, he lost $40. Jane Clayson asked the staff member who had started the bet how she knew the challenge, to which she replied, "College." Indeed, several college newspapers have noted the phenomenon on campus.

In a July 2008 episode of Good Morning America, Ted Allen revealed that the Food Detectives techs were unable to eat six saltines in a minute. All four anchors then tried it themselves, and failed. Weather anchor Sam Champion compared the moisture absorption with lake-effect snow. Allen allowed his contestants to eat the crackers in any order, even crushed up, but when Chris Cuomo wanted to "load up with water" beforehand, Allen disallowed the tactic, considering it to unfairly bypass the central problem of the challenge.

== Competitive races ==
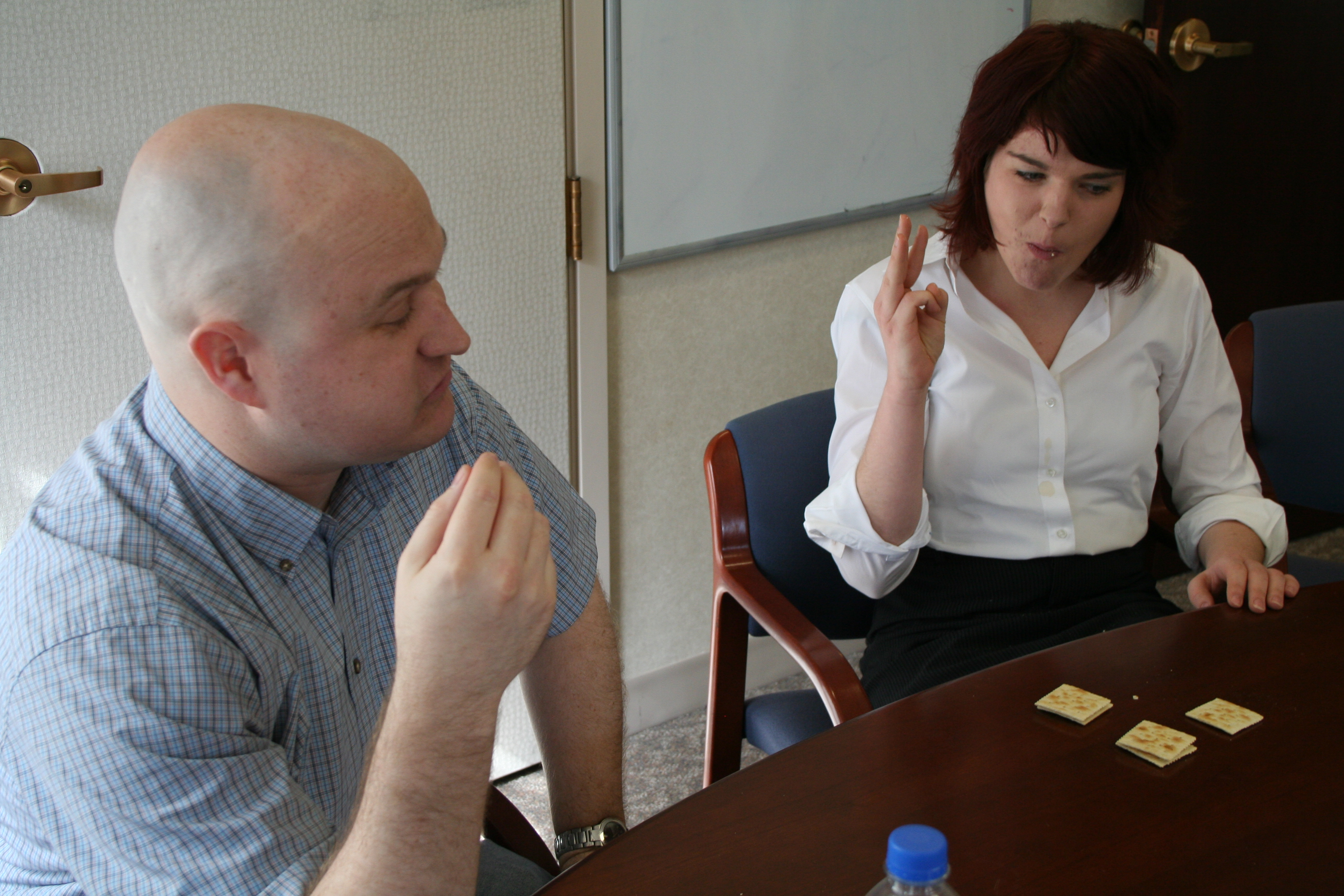
Office workers competing against the clock

Older versions of the challenge include events where one competes to be the first person to eat some number of crackers and then audibly whistle a tune. Such competitions are at least a century old.

A 1970s episode of the educational television show ZOOM, which encouraged children to try creative puzzles and games using minimal supplies, featured such a race. Contestants in this version of the race ate three saltines and then whistled.

In Grafton, North Dakota, there is an annual competition in which contestants must eat four saltines and then whistle. For nine years, it was won by Mike Stoltman of Minto; a local legend who says that he benefits from an extra salivary gland. Stoltman says that he requires two suction tubes at the dentist, and of the gland, "I don't know for sure. But my orthodontist said he's never seen saliva like that." He was upset by Greg Shane of Oslo in the 2009 running, possibly because Stoltman had been celebrating his 40th birthday. Five-time winner Kelly Schanilec (Gaddie) won the first-place trophy in 2006, 2007, 2010, 2011, and 2012.

The official Guinness World Record for the challenge is 6 crackers, and was achieved by Carson Webster when he was 13 years old, in Rancho Palos Verdes.

== Related challenges ==
A similar test is the "cinnamon challenge", in which a person must eat a tablespoon of cinnamon. Again, this is a small amount of familiar food, but it quickly dries out the mouth's saliva, making the powder hard to swallow. Some who attempt this challenge report that the cinnamon is especially unpleasant and that its dust is comparable to pepper spray. Furthermore, the presence of the aldehyde cinnamal in the essential oil of the cinnamon powder often irritates the skin and mucous membranes, adding further difficulty to the challenge. The cinnamon challenge can have hazardous health effects.

In the UK, a similar cracker eating contest occurs with Jacob's Cream Crackers, as saltine crackers are less common in the country. Rules governing the amount consumed and time taken vary per contest. Such challenges are popular amongst university student unions. The Australian version is the Weet-Bix Challenge.
