= TrashTag =

International litter picking campaign

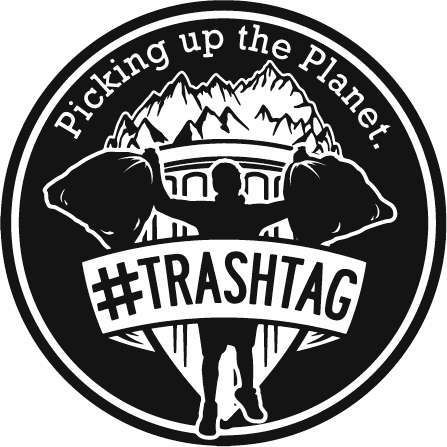
TrashTag Challenge

TrashTag is an internet challenge and hashtag campaign where people clean up a heavily littered area, posting before and after photos with the hashtag #trashtag.

== Examples and initiatives ==
Steven Reinhold started the TrashTag Challenge in 2015 after accidentally littering on a road trip. He vowed to gather 100 pieces of trash. "On this road trip, we went to all these different national parks and we were basically geotagging the trash as we picked it up," Reinhold said. "At some point, we said 'why not hashtag it #trashtag?'" Reinhold partnered with UCO Gear and developed a cleanup ambassador program spreading the challenge in the outdoor community.

Byron Roman, a Phoenix, Arizona, resident, reposted a picture on March 5, 2019, of a litter-strewn roadside area in Algeria along with an "after" shot of Drici Tani Younes posing with nine massive bags of trash, all stuffed to the brim in the middle of the freshly cleaned strip of dirt. The post went viral and was shared more than 300,000 times, prompting over fifty million new posts and imitators seeking to outdo Román or simply add to the impact of the #trashtag efforts. Trashtag has an estimated five million monthly participants.

TrashTag cleanups have been held globally in cities, mountains, rivers, and beaches. They have ranged from Mount Everest to undersea diving excursions. Cleanup challenges have been held globally including the United States, Algeria, Malaysia, Mexico, India, Nepal, Norway, Scotland, RoC, and PR China as well as being replicated in other languages such as "#basurachallenge" for Spanish.

== See also ==
- Ocean Conservancy
- Outdoor recreation
- Plogging – Picking up litter while jogging
- SpoGomi – Japanese litter collecting sport
