= Consumption of Tide Pods =

Hazardous practice and Internet meme

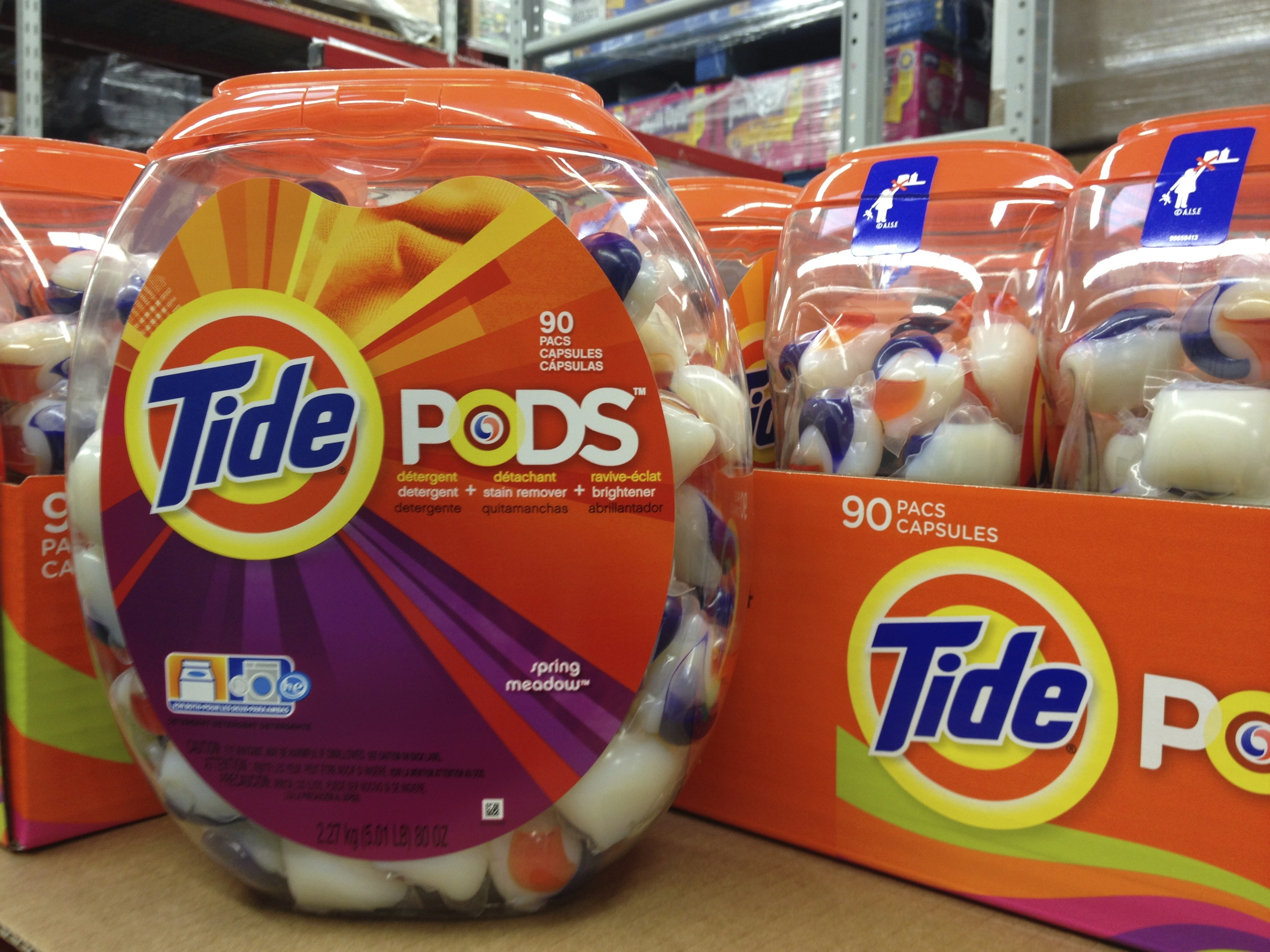
Initial packaging of Tide Pods. The plastic container was later made opaque to reduce the chance of the product being mistaken for candy.

Like most detergent products, Tide Pods, a laundry detergent pod sold by Procter & Gamble (P&G) since 2012, can be deadly if ingested. Media reports have discussed how children and those with dementia could mistake laundry pods for candy and endanger their health or life by consuming them, and they were named an emerging health risk by the Centers for Disease Control and Prevention in 2012. Between 2012 and 2013, poison control centers reported over 7,000 cases of young children eating laundry pods, and ingestion of laundry pods produced by P&G had resulted in six deaths by 2017. In response to the dangers, P&G changed Tide Pod containers to an opaque design, introduced warning labels, and added a bitter-tasting chemical to the pod contents.

In late December 2017, Tide Pods emerged within Internet meme culture. In early 2018, their presence in Internet memes led to the "Tide Pod Challenge", which involved a dare to intentionally consume the pods. Responding to the growing media outcry, Google and Facebook started to remove videos that featured the challenge, and P&G aired numerous advertisements urging people to avoid eating the pods.

== History of health risks and consumption ==
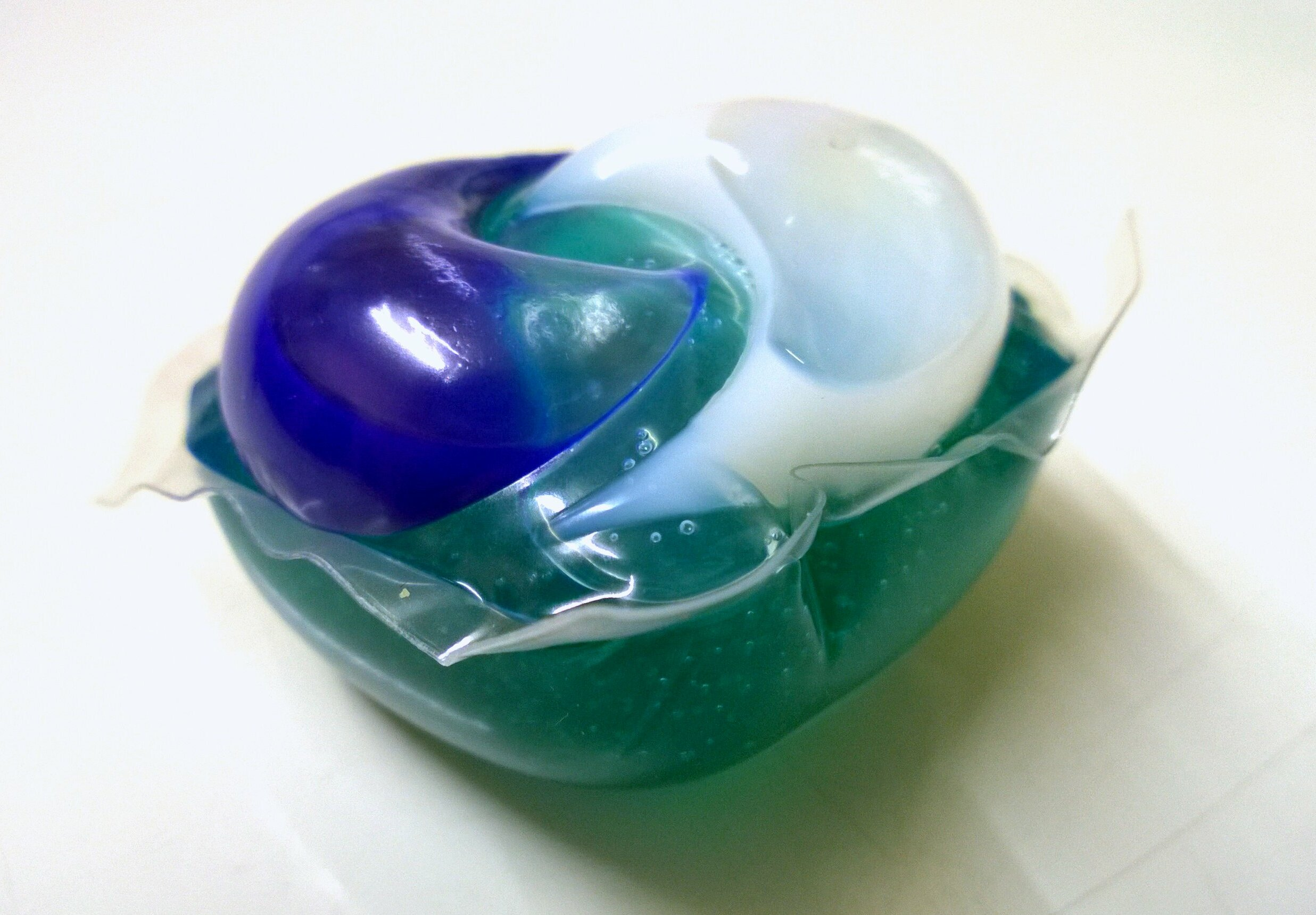
A Tide Pod from 2016

Laundry detergent pods have been in use in Europe since 2002, and moved to the US in 2010. During the Academy Awards telecast in 2012, P&G introduced their Tide Pods "in a sparkling, vibrant commercial."

The health risks posed by the ingestion of Tide Pods—particularly by children—have been noted by several media outlets, which have referenced the visual similarity the pods have to candy as a reasoning behind their consumption. Tide's laundry detergent pods follow a trend of "food imitating products", in which makers of consumer products design their cleaners and personal hygiene products to "[exhibit] food or drink attributes." John Allen, an anthropologist at Indiana University, described Tide Pods as "sort of like a cross between candy and a chicken nugget," acknowledging them as "bite sized, processed, colorful, with a non-threatening texture."

In September 2012, U.S. Senator Chuck Schumer commented on the appeal of pods, "These pods were supposed to make household chores easier, not tempt our children to swallow harmful chemicals. I saw one on my staffer's desk and I wanted to eat it." In October, the Centers for Disease Control and Prevention (CDC) called them a health risk.

In 2012 and 2013, an average of one child was admitted to hospital every day as a result of eating Tide Pods. In March 2013, Consumer Reports reported that "since early 2012, poison control centers nationwide have received reports of nearly 7,700 pod-related exposures to children age five years and younger."

Individuals suffering from dementia have been reported to face health risks related to Tide Pods. Consumer Reports reported that between the Tide Pods' introduction in 2012 through early 2017, eight deaths had been reported due to the ingestion of laundry detergent pods; two of the eight deaths were children, while the other six were adults with dementia. Additionally, pods manufactured by P&G were responsible for six of the deaths.

During the popularity of Tide Pods as an Internet meme, in the month of January 2018, the American Association of Poison Control Centers (AAPCC) "recorded 606 exposures in children less than five years old," in addition to an increase in teen exposures. In January 2018, there were more teens exposed to pods than in all of 2016 or 2017.

=== Changes in packaging and safety standards ===
Due to initial reports of children consuming their laundry detergent pods, Procter & Gamble began distributing Tide Pods in opaque tubs and bags. In 2015, P&G announced it would implement a bitter taste to its Tide Pods as a means to deter people from biting into them. The pods were strengthened to reduce the chance of them bursting when squeezed. Tide would also include child-safety features in its packaging and issue extensive warnings about locking up the pods in households shared with individuals who have Alzheimer's disease. Additionally, Tide's website includes a page discussing how to safely handle its products, and suggesting consumers drink a glass of water or milk if a product is swallowed and call a poison control center for help. Also in 2015, the American Society for Testing and Materials published the F3159-15 voluntary safety standard for liquid laundry packets.

== Internet meme ==
In early 2018, media publications noted that shortly after the product's introduction, the consumption of Tide Pods became a topic of discussion on the Internet. Ultimately, eating Tide Pods became a meme, with its origins being credited to a 2013 thread on The Straight Dope's website and a 2015 article from The Onion. Mashable quoted an instance of a tweet regarding this topic from 2012, "Why does a Tide Pod look so good to eat?" The Straight Dope thread's discussion was more centered on children accidentally eating Tide Pods, rather than the meme's iteration popularized in 2017, which portrays pods as a delicious food.

In the following years, eating Tide Pods became a popular joke online. In March 2017, CollegeHumor uploaded a sketch video titled "Don't Eat The Laundry Pods". Posts began to prefer "Tide Pods" to more generic terms such as "laundry pods" with a thread posted on Reddit's "intrusivethoughts" subreddit in July 2017. The thread, titled "Bite into one of those Tide Pods. Do it.", was referenced in another Onion article the following day. Posts on Tumblr contributed to the meme's rise, but in December 2017, the meme's popularity rose significantly due to various viral tweets. Many posts referred to the pods as a "forbidden fruit". Memes involving the Tide Pods included joking about how "delicious" they appear, as well as posting images with the pods on top of food. Vox described the meme as "pok[ing] fun at the idea of consuming the pods, while (usually) stopping short of actually doing so." The publication noted that part of the allure of discussing, wondering, and joking about consuming the pods stems from the product's warning to not eat the pods. In early January 2018, television personality Jimmy Kimmel referenced the meme when discussing a tweet from President Donald Trump, jokingly suggesting that Trump had "been in the White House laundry room eating Tide Pods again."

=== Tide Pod challenge ===
In 2018, following the meme's surge in popularity, media publications started reporting about people participating in the Tide Pod challenge, an Internet challenge in which an individual consumes Tide Pods. Teens were the reported demographic participating in the challenge; they would record themselves chewing and gagging on pods and then daring others to do the same. Some of these videos were posted on YouTube. Some teens cooked the pods before eating them.

In response to the meme, a spokesperson from Procter & Gamble (P&G) was quoted in BuzzFeed News emphasizing the purpose of their pods and the health risks associated with children: "Nothing is more important to us than the safety of the people who use our products. Our laundry pacs are a highly concentrated detergent meant to clean clothes and they're used safely in millions of households every day. They should only be used to clean clothes and kept up, closed and away from children. We have been consistently proactive in providing consumers with the right usage guidance and tools to enable them to use the product safely." Tide further stated, "They [the Tide Pods] should not be played with, whatever the circumstance is, even if it is meant as a joke."

Ann Marie Buerkle from the U.S. Consumer Product Safety Commission went on Good Morning America and commented on the meme, saying, "teens trying to be funny are now putting themselves in danger by ingesting this poisonous substance." Buerkle added, "This is what started out as a joke on the internet and now it's just gone too far."

Following the growth of the meme, YouTube and Facebook started to remove videos that depicted people eating Tide Pods or videos about the eating of Tide Pods.

Following the meme's popularization on Twitter and Reddit, many media publications wrote articles discussing the phenomenon, while warning against eating Tide Pods. In January 2018, The Washington Post stated that the AAPCC reported 37 cases of pod ingestion among teens so far that year, half of them intentional. A related Internet meme, "Tide Pod-Chan", a moe anthropomorphization of a Tide Pod in a Japanese school uniform, was created in order to warn against pod consumption. This forced YouTube and Facebook to start removing more videos.

Tide later partnered with American football player Rob Gronkowski, having him issue the message: "What the heck is going on, people? Use Tide Pods for washing. Not eating. Do not eat."

== Physiological and toxicological impacts ==
The majority of cases involving exposure to laundry detergent pods are due to ingestion. As a result, nausea, vomiting, and diarrhea are the most common effects. "Dysphagia secondary to oropharyngeal and esophageal mucosal burns and ulcers" may also happen as a result of ingestion. Other impacts resulting from pod consumption include seizures, detriments to the respiratory system, and renal and electrolyte abnormalities.

In 2012, the Carolinas Poison Center and the Poison Control Center at the Children's Hospital of Philadelphia received reports of children experiencing "vomiting, mental status changes, and respiratory distress after ingesting the contents of laundry detergent pods." The hospital noted that "swallowing conventional detergent might result in mild stomach upset, but with highly concentrated detergent pods the ingestion can cause excessive vomiting, lethargy, and gasping, and in some reported cases, victims stopped breathing and required ventilation support." The Daily Meal cited a 2014 study by the Journal of Medical Toxicology that suggested ingestion of detergent pods may cause a swallowing dysfunction that could require surgery to repair.

In 2018, Consumer Reports published a story discussing the contents of laundry detergent pods and the consequences of ingesting them, which can include death. The story detailed that pods contain ethanol, hydrogen peroxide, and soap, that when ingested can result in caustic burns to the lining of one's mouth, as well as the esophagus, stomach, and other parts of the gastrointestinal tract.

== See also ==
- List of Internet phenomena
- Benadryl challenge, a 2020 internet challenge revolving around the deliberate use, abuse and overdose of diphenhydramine, commonly referred to under the trade name Benadryl
- Milk crate challenge, a 2021 internet challenge encouraging participants to engage in a physically dangerous activity involving climbing unsecured milk crates
- Child-resistant packaging
- Generation Z
- Cinnamon challenge
