= March 1966 =

Month of 1966

<<	March 1966					>>
Su	Mo	Tu	We	Th	Fr	Sa
		1	2	3	4	5
6	7	8	9	10	11	12
13	14	15	16	17	18	19
20	21	22	23	24	25	26
27	28	29	30	31

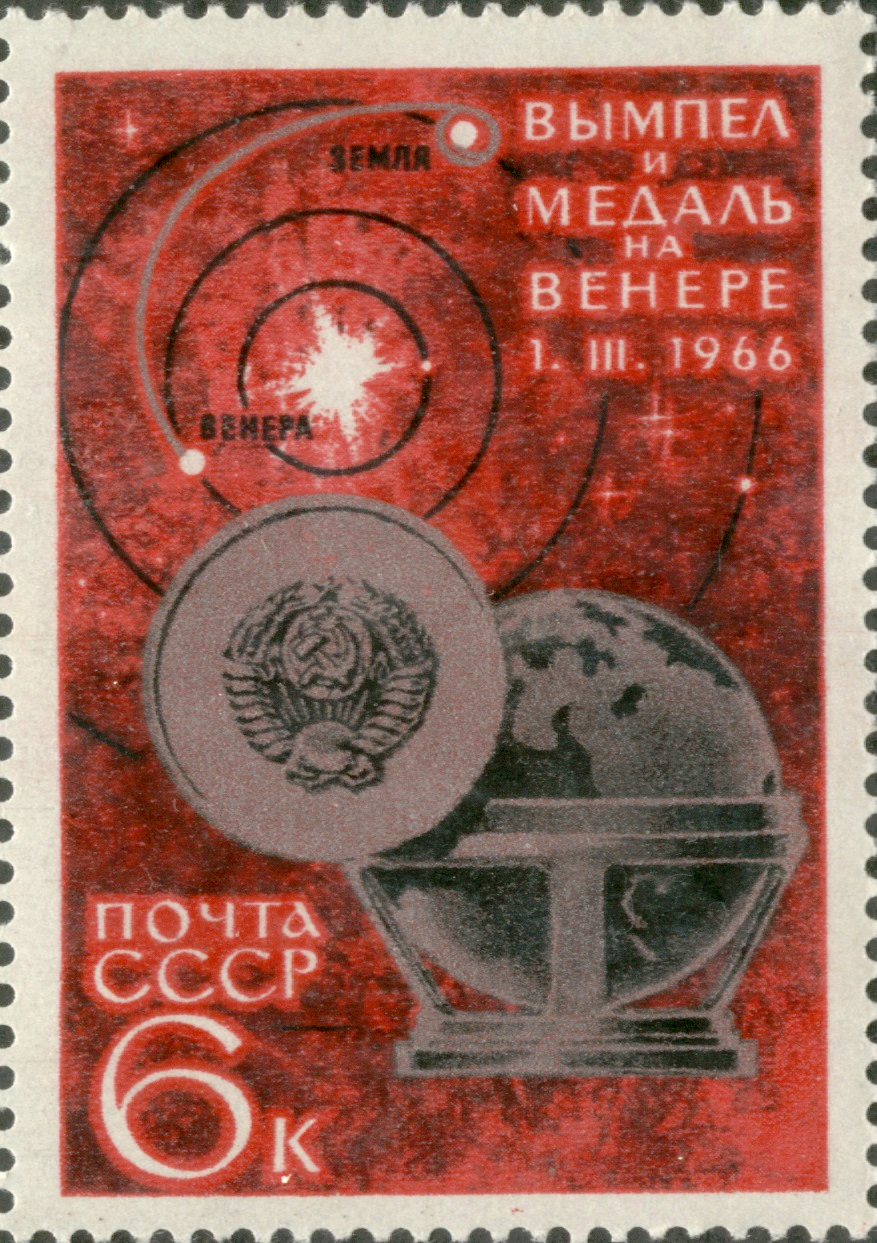
March 1, 1966: Venera 3 becomes first Earth object to land on Venus

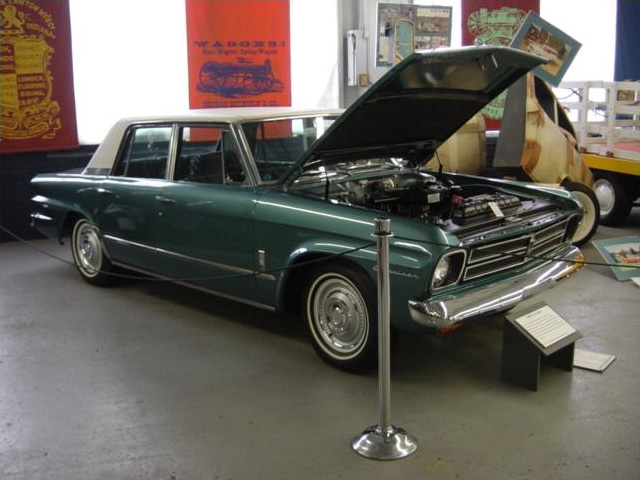
March 17, 1966: Studebaker production stops forever

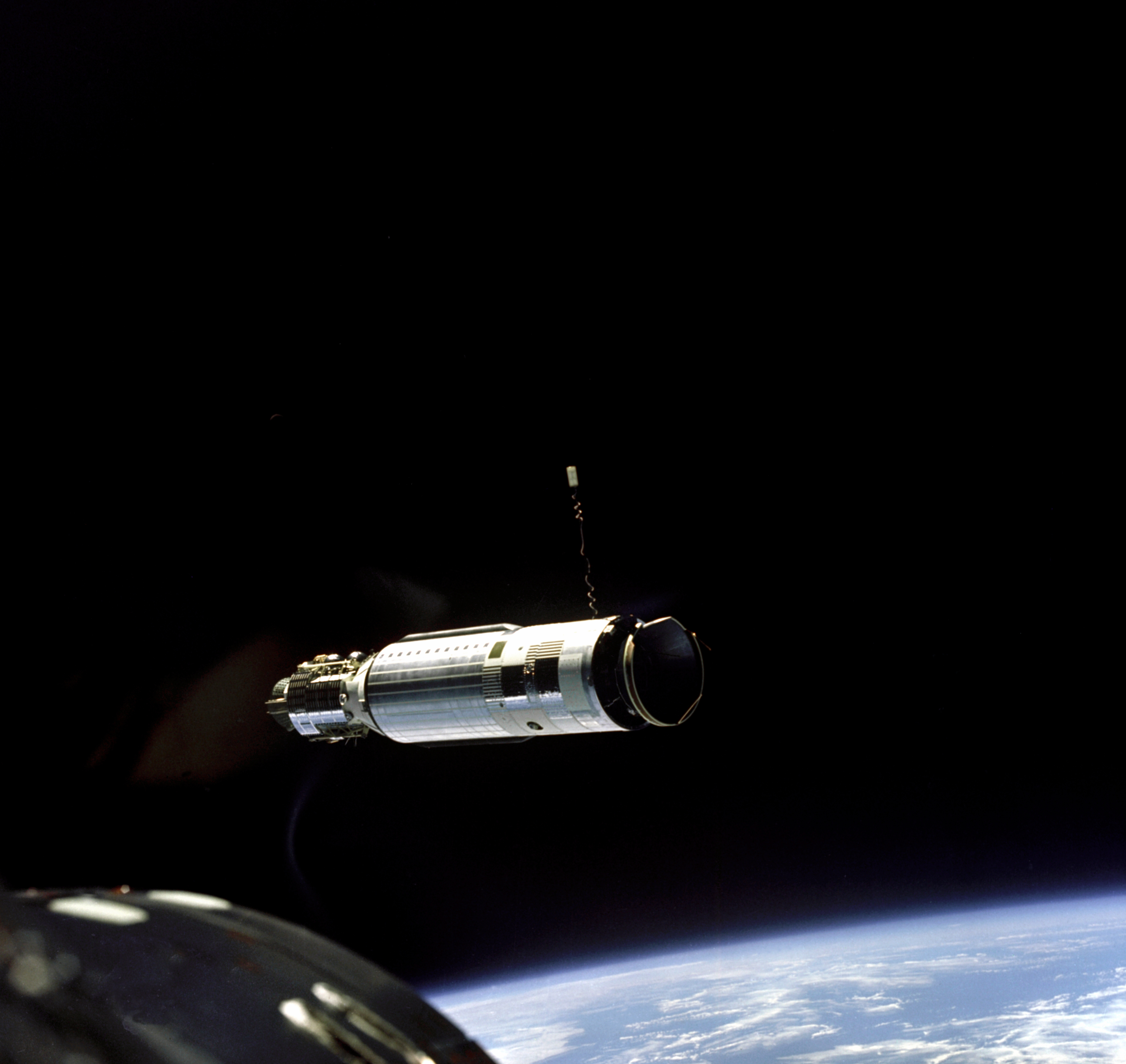
March 16, 1966: Gemini 8 accomplishes first docking in orbit

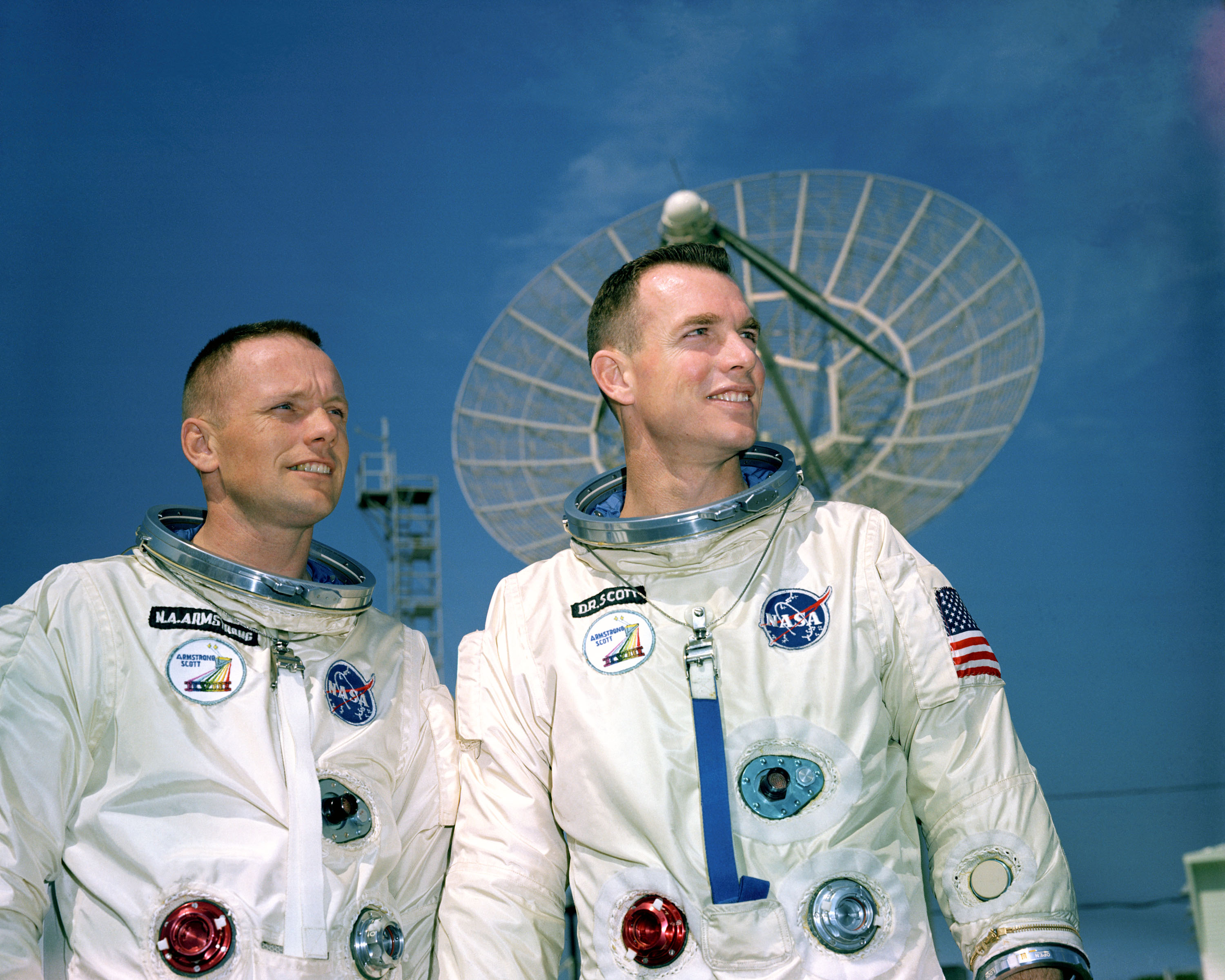
Gemini 8's Armstrong and Scott

The following events occurred in March 1966:

== March 1, 1966 (Tuesday) ==
- At 6:56 UTC (9:56 a.m. in Moscow), the Soviet space probe Venera 3 crashed on Venus, becoming the first spacecraft to land on another planet's surface. Although it was able to transmit to Earth, its data capture system had failed earlier in transit and was unable to record any data. The 2,118-pound (961 kg) vehicle had been launched on November 16, 1965.
- British Chancellor of the Exchequer (and future Prime Minister) James Callaghan announced the government's plans for the decimalisation of the pound sterling by February 1971, replacing traditional coinage. The British pound, formerly worth 240 pennies, would be divided into worth 100 cents. Since the reign of King Offa of Mercia in the 8th century, the pound had been worth 240 pennies. In 1504, the shilling, worth 12 pence, had been introduced. With 20 shillings to a pound, it would be superseded by the five pence. The florin would give way to the ten pence coin, and the crown (one-fourth of a pound) would be eliminated, there being no 25 pence coin, along with the "big penny" ("the only coin in the world worth less than its value as metal"), the threepence and the six pence.
- "Operation Jericho", the Mizo National Front uprising, began in the Assam state of India, when insurgents made simultaneous attacks on government installations at Aizawl, Lunglei, Champhai, Vairengte, Chawngte, Chhimluang, Kolasib, Sairang and Demagiri shortly after midnight. At Aizawl, the insurgents raided the city treasury and severed all outside connections at the telephone exchange at Aizawl. MNF leader Pu Laldenga declared Mizo to be an independent nation, and exhorted all Mizos to join the revolt against the "illegal Indian occupation" of the Mizo territory.
- Both houses of Congress overwhelmingly approved the appropriation of an additional $4.8 billion for the American war in Vietnam, with votes of 392–4 in the House of Representatives and 93–2 in the U.S. Senate. The lone opposition came from Senators Wayne Morse of Oregon and Ernest Gruening of Alaska, and Congressmen John Conyers (Michigan), Phillip Burton and George Brown, Jr. (California) and William Fitts Ryan (New York).
- Goals for the Apollo Applications Program (AAP) were suggested by AAP Deputy Director John H. Disher for a station operating in synchronous and high-inclination Earth orbit, using crew for orbital assembly and resupply, extended duration for Earth orbits, extended lunar exploration, and a broad range of experiments in space.

== March 2, 1966 (Wednesday) ==
- Former President of Ghana Kwame Nkrumah arrived in Guinea, where President Sekou Toure granted him asylum and gave him the honorary title of "Co-President of Guinea". The offer appeared to be made in the hope that if Nkrumah regained power, Toure would become "Co-President of Ghana".

== March 3, 1966 (Thursday) ==
- A violent F5 tornado struck without warning at 4:33 p.m. and devastated the Candlestick Park Shopping Center in Jackson, Mississippi, killing 13 people. The storms wrought catastrophic damage in Mississippi and Alabama along a 202.5 mi (325.9 km) track. Overall, 62 people (all but one in Mississippi) were killed in the storm and hundreds injured.
- The Zond 3 space probe to Mars, launched on July 18, 1965, from the Soviet Union, stopped transmitting at a range of 153,000,000 kilometres (95,000,000 mi), in the third failure of a Soviet interplanetary probe in less than a month.
- NASA's George E. Mueller and Joseph F. Shea discussed a detailed technical description of progress toward a landing rocket system for Apollo spacecraft.
- Born: Tone Lōc (stage name for Anthony Terrell Smith), American hip hop artist and voice actor; in Los Angeles
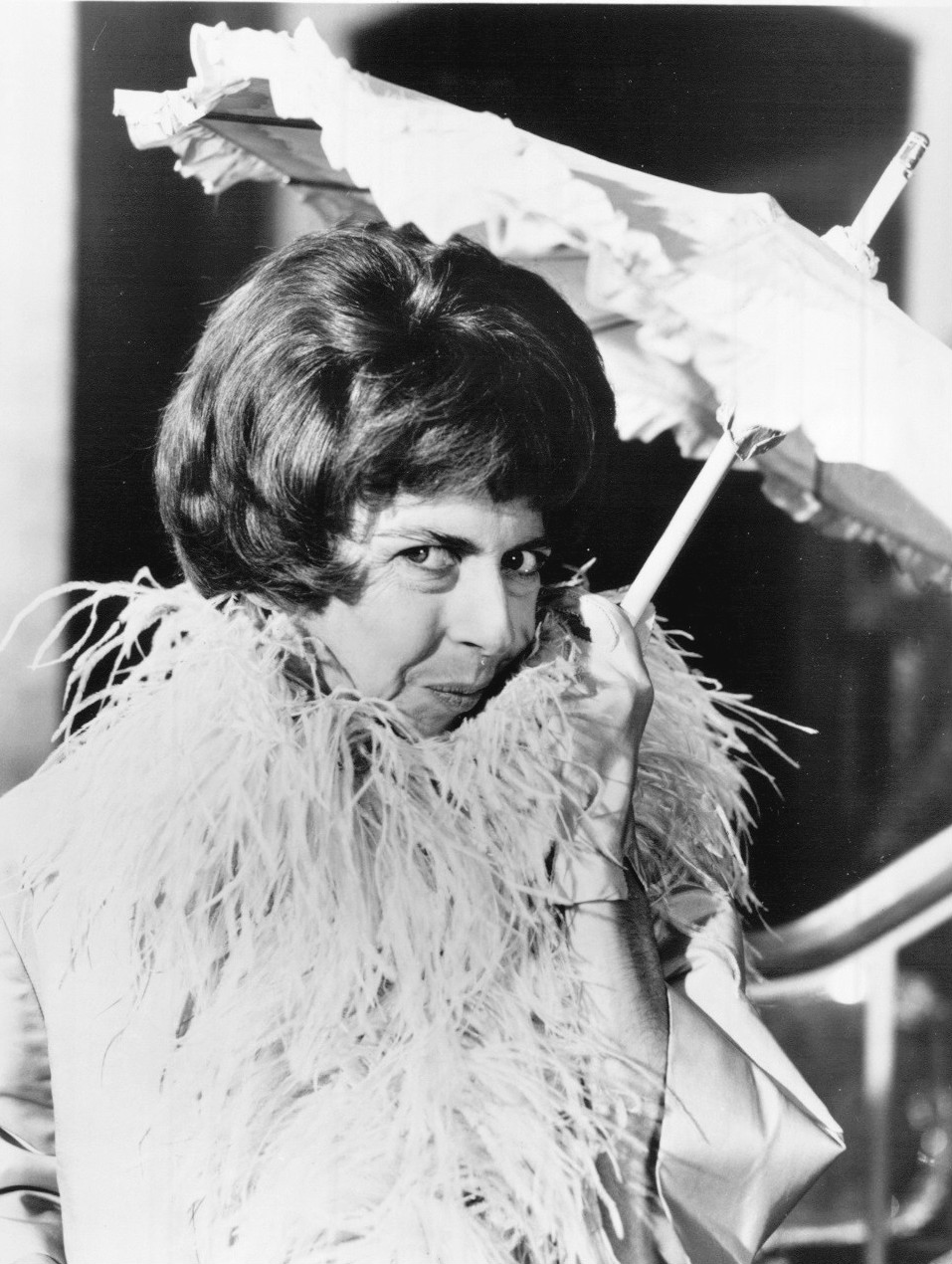
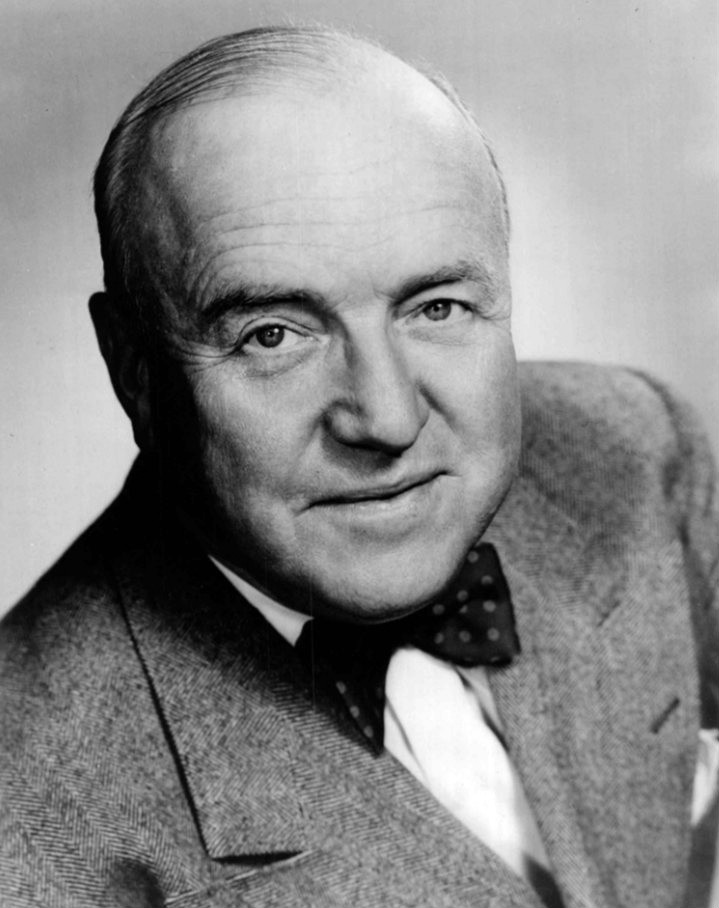
Pearce and Frawley
- Died:
  - Alice Pearce, 47, Emmy-winning American television actress for her portrayal of the character "Gladys Kravitz" on Bewitched, died from ovarian cancer that she had been battling since the series had started.
  - William Frawley, 79, American actor best known for portraying "Fred Mertz" on I Love Lucy, suffered a fatal heart attack as he was walking back from a movie to his apartment at the Knickerbocker Hotel in Hollywood.

== March 4, 1966 (Friday) ==
- The London Evening Standard published Maureen Cleave's interview with John Lennon of The Beatles, in an article headlined "How Does a Beatle Live? John Lennon Lives Like This". One of the topics covered was his religious views, and the article, syndicated in papers worldwide, made little impact at first, including Lennon's statement that "Christianity will go. It will vanish and shrink. I needn't argue about that; I'm right and I will be proved right. We're more popular than Jesus now; I don't know which will go first— rock 'n' roll or Christianity. Jesus was all right but his disciples were thick and ordinary. It's them twisting it that ruins it for me." When the article appeared in the teen magazine Datebook in July, however, Lennon's statement proved a backlash against the popular British group in advance of their American tour. On August 2, the station manager of WAQY-AM radio in Birmingham, Alabama would begin urging listeners to boycott record stores and bookstores that sold Beatles' music and memorabilia.
- At 8:15 p.m. local time, Canadian Pacific Airlines Flight 402 from Hong Kong crashed while attempting to land in a fog at Tokyo International Airport, killing 64 of the 72 people on board. Coming in too low, the DC-8 struck one of the runway approach lights, then hit other lights before impacting a seawall and bursting into flames, Another plane taking off from the same airport the next morning would crash, killing all 124 passengers and crew on board.
- The Studebaker Corporation announced that it would close its last car factory (located in Hamilton, Ontario) and that all further production of Studebaker automobiles would cease. In 1965, the company— which had sold 268,229 cars at its peak year in 1950— had sold only 11,000 of its vehicles. The American factory, in South Bend, Indiana, had closed at the end of 1963.
- The burials of NASA astronauts Elliot See and Charles Bassett, who had died in a T-38 crash on February 28, took place at Arlington National Cemetery, two days after their memorial services in Texas.
- Born: Dav Pilkey, American children's author best known for the Captain Underpants book series; in Cleveland
- Died: Joseph Fields, 71, American playwright and film producer

== March 5, 1966 (Saturday) ==
- For the first time, the secret, high speed Lockheed D-21 drone, codenamed "Tagboard", was successfully deployed in flight from a supersonic aircraft, after engineers overcame the problem of separating the two aircraft without damaging either one. The M-21 airplane released the drone over the Pacific Ocean off of the coast of California but the drone "stayed close to the M-21's back for a few seconds, which seemed like 'two hours' to the M-21 crew" before setting off on its assigned course. It was lost 120 miles from the launch point.
- One day after the Tokyo crash of Canadian Pacific Airlines Flight 402 as it was arriving from Hong Kong, BOAC Flight 911 crashed shortly after takeoff from the same airport on a flight to Hong Kong. Seventeen minutes after departing at 1:58 p.m., the Boeing 707 suddenly began breaking apart in severe clear-air turbulence and impacted on Mount Fuji at 2:15, killing all 124 passengers and crew on board. More than half of those killed were the 75 people on an Asian tour that had been sponsored by the Thermo King Corporation for employees and their families.
- On the fifth day of the Mizo uprising, the Indian Air Force began bombardment of the city of Aizawl, where MNF forces were stationed. The town's civilians had fled, while the MNF leadership maintained a headquarters at the Boys' English Middle School.
- "Merci, Chérie", sung by Udo Jürgens (who also composed and wrote the lyrics with help from Thomas Hörbiger), won the Eurovision Song Contest 1966 for Austria.
- Born: Michael Irvin, American NFL wide receiver and member of Pro Football Hall of Fame; in Fort Lauderdale, Florida
- Died: Anna Akhmatova, 76, Russian poet

== March 6, 1966 (Sunday) ==
- The Revolutionary Party won a surprise majority (28 of 54 seats) in elections for the Congress of Guatemala but none of the three presidential candidates obtained the necessary majority, so a runoff was scheduled. On the same day, 32 members of the outlawed Guatemalan Party of Labour (PGT), accused of aiding guerrillas, became desparecidos after being arrested by government security forces, in one of the earliest modern examples of "forced disappearance".
- Police in Japan responded to the seven-week-long "student strike" at Waseda University by occupying the campus and barring students from entering, effectively closing the prominent university until the dispute was settled on June 22.
- In elections in Austria, the Austrian People's Party (Österreichische Volkspartei or ÖVP), led by Chancellor Josef Klaus, gained four seats for a majority, with 85 of the 165 seats in the Nationalrat.
- Operation Masher came to an end in Vietnam after six weeks, with 288 American soldiers killed in action, and a reported 2,150 or more deaths of the North Vietnamese insurgents.
- Born:
  - Alan Davies, English comedian and actor; in Loughton, Essex
  - Lisa Salters, American journalist, in King of Prussia, Pennsylvania

== March 7, 1966 (Monday) ==
- Two weeks after saying that he intended to withdraw from NATO by April 4, 1969, President Charles de Gaulle of France sent a letter to U.S. President Johnson, informing him that his nation intended to pull out of the alliance effective July 1, 1966, and that all member armies and equipment would need to be removed from France within a year. De Gaulle's letter arrived at the White House shortly after 3:00 p.m. Washington time (9:00 p.m. in Paris), and at 7:15 p.m., French Ambassador Charles Lucet reported to the U.S. State Department to receive the president's reply from Undersecretary of State George Ball.
- Stephen Martin, a baseball player at Tulane University, became the first African American to play a varsity sport in the previously all-white Southeastern Conference (SEC). Martin, a walk-on who was attending the school on an academic scholarship, made his varsity debut for the Green Wave in the team's season opener against Spring Hill College. The 1966 season was Tulane's last as an SEC member.
- At the United Nations, the International Convention on the Elimination of All Forms of Racial Discrimination was signed by representatives of nine nations on the first day that it was opened for signature. Brazil, the Central African Republic, Greece, Israel, the Philippines, Poland, and the three members from the USSR (the Soviet Union, the Byelorussian SSR, and the Ukrainian SSR).

== March 8, 1966 (Tuesday) ==
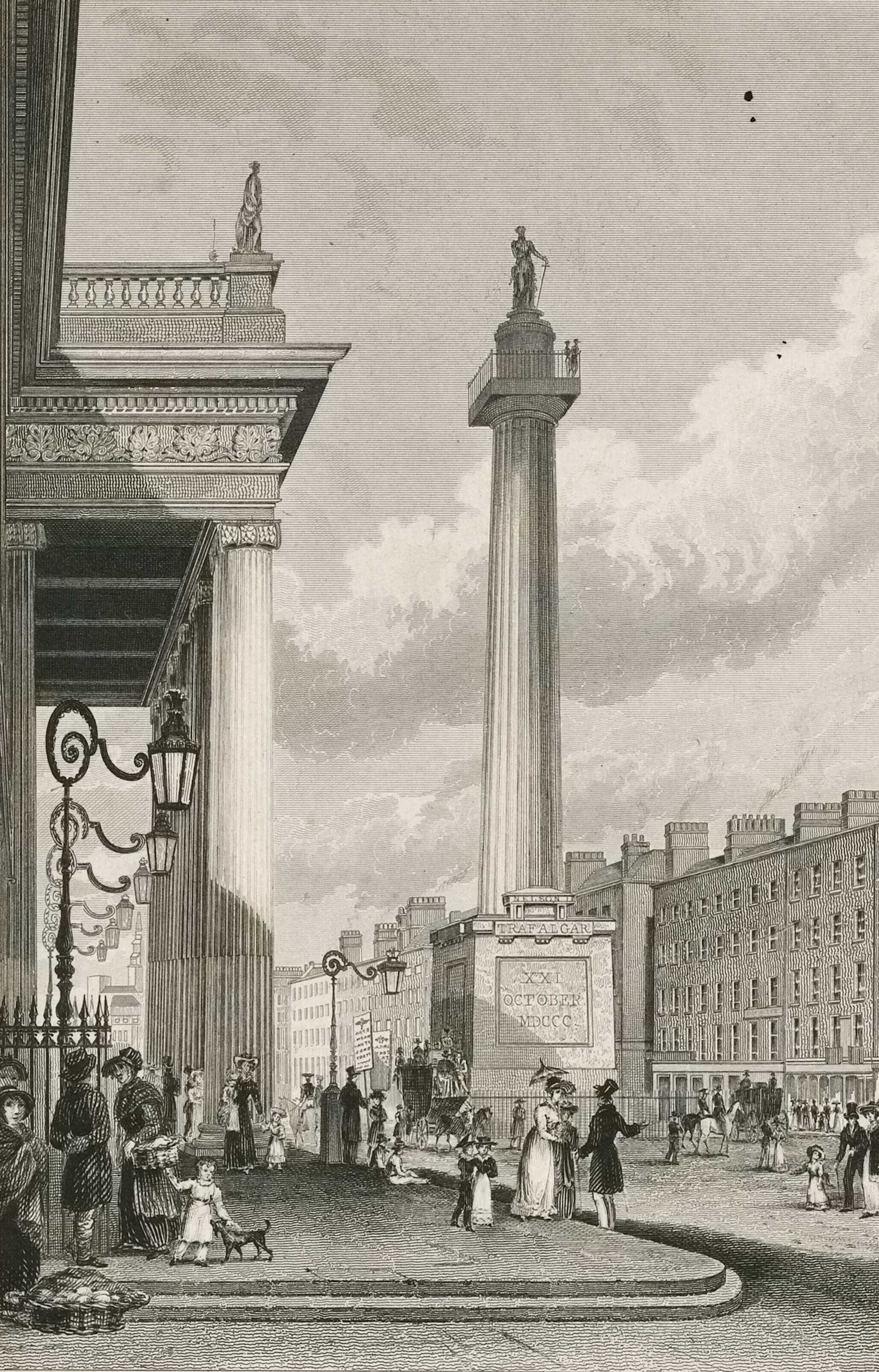
Nelson's Pillar

- At 1:32 a.m., the 121-foot (37 m) tall Nelson's Pillar on O'Connell Street in Dublin was blown up by former Irish Republican Army volunteers, who were apparently marking the 50th anniversary of the Easter Rising. As a symbol of Britain's one-time control of Ireland, the Pillar was unpopular. The bomb destroyed the upper half of the Doric column, and the 13-foot (4.0 m) tall statue of Lord Admiral Horatio Nelson of Great Britain broke as it crashed into the street. Six days later, the Irish government demolished the rest of the pillar after determining that it could not safely be restored. A 120-metre (390 ft) stainless steel needle, the Spire of Dublin (120 metres tall to replace the 121-foot-tall pillar), would be erected on the site in 2003.
- After Syria's new president, Nureddin al-Atassi, called for a "liberation war" against neighboring Israel, forces led by General Ziad al-Hariri advanced from the Syrian front toward the Israeli border. The Commander of the 70th Armoured Brigade, Lieutenant General Abd al-Karim, surrendered to the plotters – Muhammad Umran took over as acting commander. With the forces in al-Kiswah defeated and Qatana neutralised, al-Hariri's forces marched upon Damascus and began to set up road-blocks in the city, seizing critical facilities such as the Central Post Office. Captain Salim Hatum, a party officer, seized the radio station. The Ministry of Defence headquarters was seized without a fight, and General Zahr al-Din, the commander-in-chief, was put under arrest. Hafez al-Assad led a small group of conspirators to capture the al-Dumayr air base. Some of its planes were ordered to bomb rebel positions. Later that morning the conspirators convened at army headquarters to celebrate.
- Protesting the government of Indonesia's President Sukarno, a mob of students in Jakarta seized control of the building housing the Indonesian Foreign Ministry and destroyed much of the interior, while another group attacked the United States Embassy.

== March 9, 1966 (Wednesday) ==
- British Prime Minister Harold Wilson announced that a longstanding rule, requiring a wait of 50 years before release of government records, was reduced to 30 years. The effect was to make the records of the last two and a half years of World War I documents immediately available to researchers, along with all other documents of the British Empire up through 1935.
- George Cornell, 38, an English criminal and a member of The Richardson Gang, was shot dead by Ronnie Kray, at The Blind Beggar pub in Whitechapel, in the East End of London. Known as "the Kray twins", Ronnie and his brother Reggie were the most famous members of organized crime in Britain. "The murder of George Cornell marked the beginning of the end for the Krays", an author would later note, leading to the arrest of both men for murder in 1968, for which both were sentenced to life imprisonment. Another historian would note, "The importance of this killing is that it had such immense repercussions throughout gangland and broke all the rules previously regarded as standard practice."
- Two days after French President De Gaulle's letter to U.S. President Johnson, Foreign Minister Maurice Couve de Murville told France's 14 NATO Allies that it would withdraw its officers from the unified command, assume full command over its 70,000 military personnel in West Germany, and would close all allied bases that did not surrender to French control.
- A team of engineers from Douglas Aircraft Company presented a technical briefing and cost proposal on the company's design on the airlock for the AAP. NASA's George Mueller expressed strong interest in the AAP spent-stage experiment to establish a solid basis for space station requirements, contingent on definite approval from NASA Administrator
- Merlyn Rees, the UK Under-Secretary of Defence for the Army, confirmed the closure of Norton Manor Camp near Taunton.

== March 10, 1966 (Thursday) ==
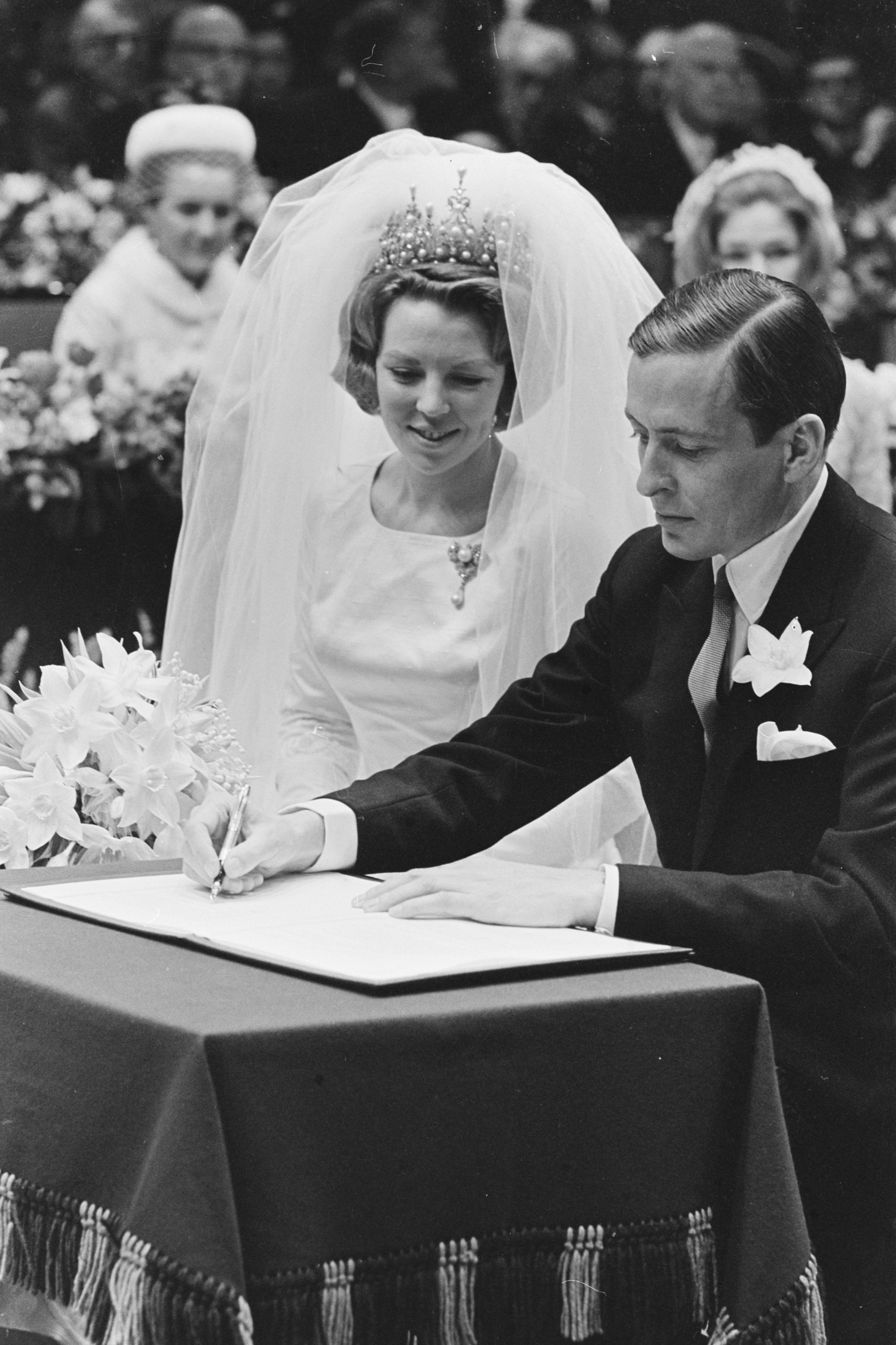
March 10, 1966: Wedding of Beatrix of the Netherlands and Prince Claus

- Crown Princess Beatrix of the Netherlands married German diplomat Claus von Amsberg in a religious ceremony at Amsterdam's oldest church, the Westerkerk. They then repeated their vows in a civil ceremony at the Amsterdam City Hall. Outside of the Hall, 2,000 angry protesters, with memories of the Nazi occupation of the Netherlands during the Second World War, demonstrated against the union, because von Amsberg had been a member of the Hitler Youth and had served as a soldier in the German Army during the war. That evening, the new Prince Claus appeared on television and asked the nation, "Give us the chance to build on a new future together with you all. The Dutch people were given unspeakably much sorrow and great injustice during the last war... nobody can undo the past." By the time that Beatrix became Queen of the Netherlands in 1980, Prince Claus would be regarded as one of the more popular members of the Royal Family.
- Thousands of Muslims from the Indian state of West Bengal effectively shut down the streets of Calcutta (now Kolkata) with a 2-mile (3.2 km) long procession of marchers, in order to call attention to food shortages, inflation and government repression in their area of India. The march came in response to a call for a bandh, a coordinated work stoppage to achieve a goal. Trains and buses were halted, most stores and offices closed because their employees could not make it to work, factories were at a standstill, and ships could not enter or leave the inland Port of Calcutta.
- Prime Minister and Air Marshal Nguyen Cao Ky of South Vietnam, with the support of eight generals on the 10-man military junta, voted to remove Lieutenant General Nguyen Chanh Thi (who was regarded as Ky's main rival for power, and the only one to vote against) as the commander of I Corps, and placed him under house arrest pending forced exile, precipitating the Buddhist Uprising.
- Born: Edie Brickell, American singer and songwriter; in Dallas
- Died: Mari Sandoz, 69, American novelist (The Horsecatcher) and biographer (Crazy Horse: The Strange Man of the Oglalas)

== March 11, 1966 (Friday) ==
- The "Transition to the New Order" took place in Indonesia when President Sukarno signed a document that effectively surrendered nearly all of his powers to his Defense Minister, General Suharto, leaving Sukarno as the nominal head of state but only a figurehead. The historic instrument would become known as the Supersemar, an acronym for its official Indonesian title, Surat Perintah Sebelas Maret (literally the "letter of command of eleventh of March"), but also a label referencing the prefix "super-" and "Semar", the name of the guardian spirit of the island of Java in Javanese mythology. Sukarno had been holding a meeting of his cabinet at Merdeka Palace as student demonstrators protested outside, and was interrupted with the news that unidentified troops had surrounded the building, and that he should escape. Along with Foreign Minister Subandrio and Deputy Premier Chairul Saleh, Sukarno boarded a helicopter and flew from Jakarta to nearby Bogor. That evening, three generals persuaded Sukarno that the only way to restore order would be to give General Suharto full authority for the remainder of the crisis.
- "Norman 3X" Butler (later Muhammad Abdul Aziz), "Thomas 15X" Johnson (later Khalil Islam) and Thomas Hagan (aka Talmadge Hayer), all members of the Black Muslim's Nation of Islam movement, were found guilty of the murder of activist Malcolm X at the Audubon Ballroom in New York City on February 21, 1965. The jury, composed of three black and nine white jurors, returned its verdict at 12:30 a.m. after deliberations that had started on Wednesday, at the conclusion of an eight-week long trial. All three defendants would be sentenced to life imprisonment on April 14.
- Former Harvard University Professor Timothy Leary was sentenced to 30 years in a federal prison and fined $30,000 by a U.S. District Court Judge Ben C. Connally in Laredo, Texas after being convicted under the Marihuana Tax Act of 1937 of smuggling marijuana into the United States and failing to pay a tax on it. However, he would successfully challenge the Act as unconstitutional, and the law, along with Leary's conviction, would be voided in 1969 by the United States Supreme Court in Leary v. United States.
- Manned Spacecraft Center (MSC) planners submitted the MSC's plan for to procure an S-IVB Saturn rocket stage for an orbital workshop experiment support module. The components would be the an S-IVB stage, an Apollo command and service module, and a support module interconnect, which MSC proposed to award to McDonnell for development.

== March 12, 1966 (Saturday) ==
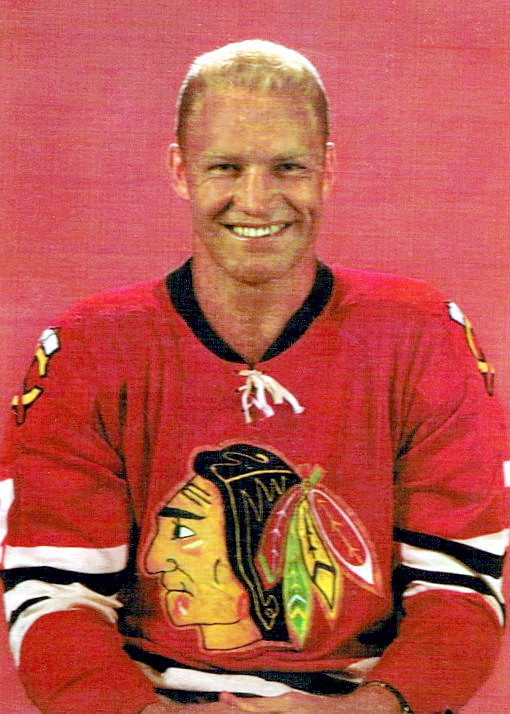
Hull

- Bobby Hull of the Chicago Black Hawks broke the National Hockey League record for most goals in a season as he scored his 51st goal, breaking the mark of 50 that he and Bernie Geoffrion had shared; Hull would finish the season with 54 altogether, as well as a record 97 scoring points.
- President Guillermo León Valencia of Colombia and President Ramón Castro Jijón of Ecuador and other members of his junta met at the Rumichaca Bridge that serves as the main crossing between the two South American nations, and signed the Treaty on Integration of the Borderland of Colombia and Ecuador, an agreement to work together on 57 projects for the benefit of the two countries.
- Fiji's Alliance Party was created by a merger of two other political parties, the Fijian Association Party and the National Congress of Fiji. Promoting itself as a "multi-racial party", as opposed to the Federation Party, which was primarily Indian, the Alliance attracted Fijian, European and Indian members under the leadership of Kamisese Mara and would win a majority in elections six months later.
- After nearly two years of excavation, Paradip Port was opened on the east coast of India, in the state of Orisha. The Indian Navy survey ship INS Investigator became the first sea vessel to dock at the new deep port, which had been dug by the Yugoslavian dredger ship Vlasina. As such, Prime Minister of Yugoslavia Petar Stambolić was accorded the honor of declaring the port open.
- Indonesian politician Sudharmono, a supporter of new leader Suharto, wrote a decree banning the Communist Party of Indonesia (PKI), the pretext for firing all PKI members serving in the Cabinet of President Sukarno. Sixteen top officials would be arrested, including Vice-Premier Subandrio and Third Deputy Premier Chaerul Saleh.

== March 13, 1966 (Sunday) ==
- In Portuguese West Africa (now Angola), separatist leader Jonas Savimbi broke with other anti-colonial fighters and announced the foundation of his own group, UNITA (União Nacional para a Independência Total de Angola, the National Union for the Total Independence of Angola). After the grant of independence from Portugal in 1975, UNITA would continue to fight against the republic government during the Angolan Civil War.
- An 8.0 magnitude earthquake took place offshore between eastern Taiwan (closest to Hualien) and Japan's westernmost island, Yonaguni. Despite the magnitude, only six deaths were reported, two in Japan and four in Taiwan.
- In elections in El Salvador, the National Conciliation Party won and retained its majority in the Legislative Assembly, with 31 of 52 seats.
- Born: Akira Nogami, Japanese professional wrestler billed as "Akira"; in Narashino

== March 14, 1966 (Monday) ==
- Without debate, the United States Senate passed the bill abolishing the United States Postal Savings System, in existence since June 25, 1910, and sent it to President Johnson for his signature. The plan, originally created to offer the public "a convenient and safe place for its savings", was limited by law to paying no more than 2 percent interest annually, and no more than $2,500 could be allowed in an account. A Senate committee report on the bill, passed on July 12 by the House of Representatives, concluded that after more than 50 years "the postal savings system as a useful segment of the national economy has run its course." President Johnson would sign the legislation two weeks later, on March 28.
- East German border guards shot and killed two children who had sneaked into the area near the Berlin Wall after nightfall. Jörg Hartmann, aged 10, died at the scene, while Lothar Schleusener, 13, died of his injuries at the People's Police Hospital. The relatives of the two boys were told by East German authorities that the children had died in an accident. The truth would not be revealed until after German reunification in 1990.
- Major General Nguyễn Văn Chuân became commander of I Corps in South Vietnam, following the removal of General Thi.

== March 15, 1966 (Tuesday) ==
- Off the Mediterranean coast of Spain, the United States Navy submersible DSV Alvin located the American hydrogen bomb that had been missing for 47 days. Still connected to a parachute, the weapon, lost in an air collision on January 17, was 2,150 feet (660 m) below the ocean surface. An attempt by the Alvin to retrieve the bomb the next day caused the parachute line to snap, and the bomb would be lost again for two weeks.
- The decennial census was held in Romania and counted the population of Romania on that date to be 19,103,163 people, of whom 87.7% were of Romanian ancestry, with a substantial minority of Hungarians (more than 1.6 million or 8.7% of the population) being the second-largest group.
- The first military academy in Sierra Leone was opened at Benguema, with the assistance of advisers from Israel, to educate the new generation of military officers in that African nation. Twenty-five Sierra Leoneans and a Nigerian began training as the first group of cadets.
- The 8th Annual Grammy Awards were held, at Chicago, Los Angeles, Nashville and New York City. Country singer Roger Miller received five awards, Frank Sinatra four and Vladimir Horowitz three.
- Died: Osendé Afana, 35, Cameroonian Marxist economist and militant nationalist, was killed by Cameroon government troops

== March 16, 1966 (Wednesday) ==
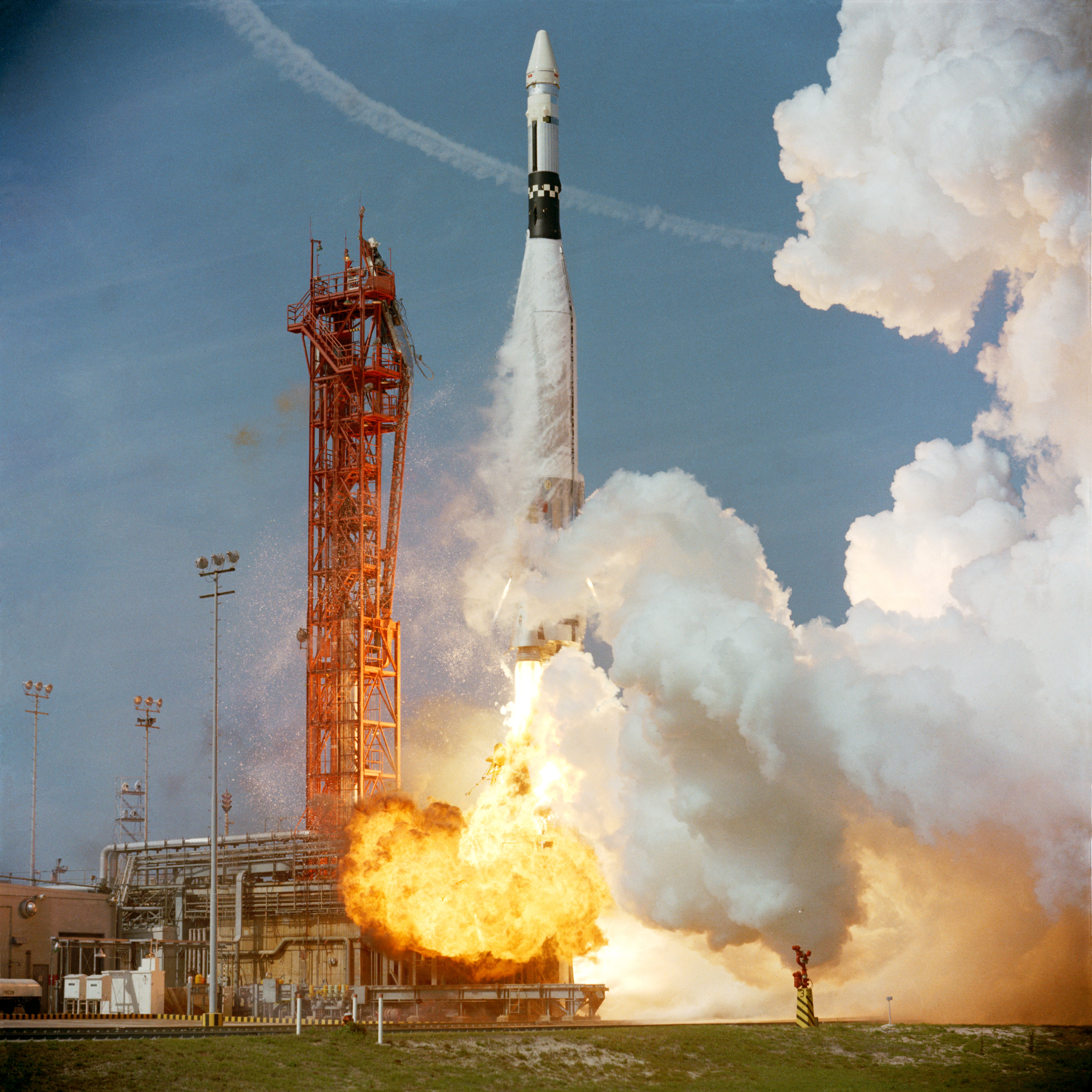
March 16, 1966: Launch of Atlas-Agena target vehicle for Gemini 8

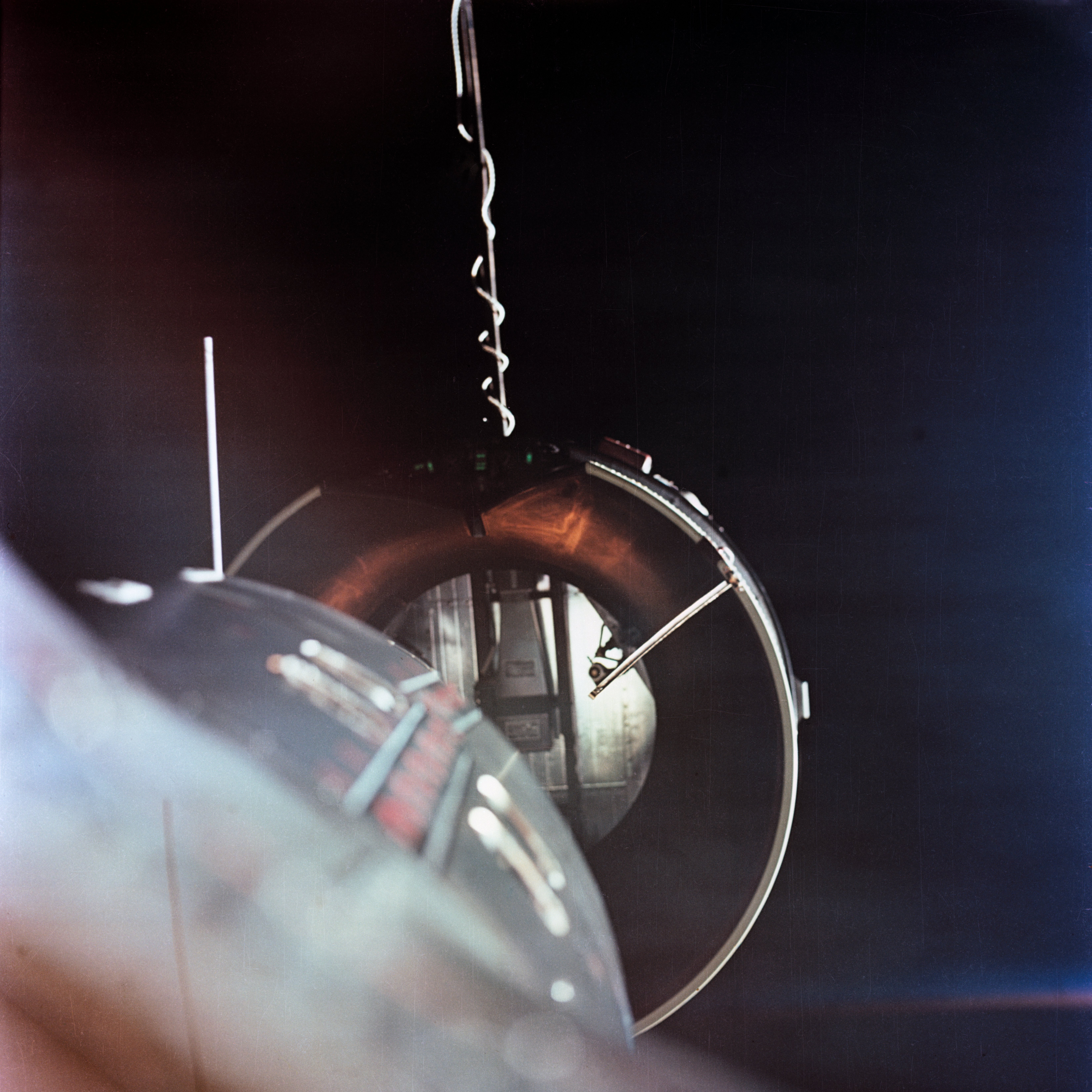
Gemini 8 and Agena target vehicle just before docking

- The first docking of two spacecraft in orbit took place, despite dangerous conditions. At 11:41 a.m. local (Florida) time, NASA launched Gemini 8 from Cape Kennedy, carrying command pilot Astronaut Neil A. Armstrong and pilot Astronaut David R. Scott. Earlier, at 10:00 a.m., the uncrewed Gemini Atlas-Agena target vehicle had lifted off. Upon entering orbit, Gemini 8 was 1,050 miles (1,690 km) away from the Agena, and Armstrong and Scott maneuvered their spacecraft toward it, closing to 150 feet (46 m) by about 5:30 p.m., with no relative motion between the two vehicles. Orbital station-keeping maneuvers preceded docking of Gemini 8 with the Agena, which was accomplished forty-eight minutes later, at 6:14 p.m. A major problem developed 27 minutes after docking. Suddenly, the docked vehicles began a violent roll in space and the crew was forced to separate their craft from the target vehicle. A stuck spacecraft orbit attitude and maneuver system (OAMS) thruster caused their ship to begin tumbling uncontrollably at 60 revolutions per minute. "With fuel close to depletion and the crew approaching dizziness and then black-out (with its fatal consequences)," an author would later note, Armstrong gradually stopped the spinning by manually operating the capsule's reaction control system and, under mission rules for an emergency, returned to Earth as soon as possible using their remaining fuel. The retrofire sequence was initiated in the seventh revolution, followed by nominal reentry and landing in a secondary recovery area in the western Pacific Ocean. The spacecraft touched down less than 7 miles (11 km) from the planned landing point at 10:22 p.m. The recovery ship, the destroyer USS Leonard F. Mason (DD-852), safely recovered both crew and spacecraft some three hours later.
- Following the early termination of Gemini 8, Gemini Agena target vehicle (GATV) 5003 remained in orbit, where its various systems were extensively exercised. GATV 5003 electrical power was exhausted during the 10th day of orbit and the vehicle could no longer be controlled. Before that, however, all attitude control gas was vented overboard to preclude errant thruster malfunction, and the vehicle was placed into a 220-nautical-mile (410 km; 250 mi) circular decay orbit, one of the secondary objectives of the Gemini 8 mission. This would put GATV 5003 low enough during the Gemini 10 mission to be inspected by the astronauts.
- The U.S. House of Representatives voted 291–93 to approve a bill establishing a single standard across the United States for the beginning and ending of daylight saving time, after the U.S. Senate had approved something similar. The bill, which would quickly be signed by President Johnson, established that clocks would be moved forward an hour on the last Sunday in April, and moved back an hour on the first Sunday in October. Previously, the time was set by individual counties and towns.
- The Soviet satellite Kosmos 110 and its two passengers, the dogs Veterok and Ugolyok, returned to Earth safely after having been in orbit since February 22. Having been aloft for 22 days, the canine pair had been in space longer than any other living being up to that time.
- Paul Van Doren, his brother James, and Gordon C. Lee opened the first Vans store at 704 East Broadway in Anaheim, California.

== March 17, 1966 (Thursday) ==
- In Hamilton, Ontario, the last Studebaker automobile was driven off the assembly line and production of the vehicle halted entirely.
- To call attention to the low wages, long hours and poor working conditions of migrant workers on grape farms, Roberto Bustos led more than 65 of his fellow grape pickers to start a march from Delano, California, to the state capital at Sacramento, 250 miles (400 km) away, with the support of the National Farm Workers Association. Over the next 25 days, the marchers would pass through farming communities to plead their case, and by the time they reached the State Capitol building on Easter Sunday, there would be more than 8,000 supporters present.
- South Vietnamese General Nguyen Chanh Thi was allowed to return to his stronghold of Huế in his former I Corps, in an attempt by the junta to dampen disquiet over his firing. Around 20,000 supporters mobbed him, shouting and trying to touch him.
- Homer E. Newell, NASA Associate Administrator for Space Science and Applications, asked for approval of the Apollo Telescope Mount (ATM) project from Deputy Administrator Robert C. Seamans, Jr. The ATM, Newell said, provided the means to obtain high-resolution data about the Sun during periods of maximum solar activity and served as a basis for evaluating ability to operate as an essential element within a complete crewed space science system.
- The extravehicular life support system (ELSS) for the Gemini 9A mission, scheduled for a June launch, was delivered to Cape Kennedy.
- Born: Andrew Rosindell, British Conservative politician, former Shadow Minister of Home Affairs; in Romford
- Died: Don Eagle, 40, Canadian-born Mohawk who became a popular professional wrestler, committed suicide.

== March 18, 1966 (Friday) ==
- In Moscow, the Presidium of the Supreme Soviet, national legislative body for the Soviet Union, passed three laws restricting religious practice. The organizer of an unauthorized gathering, ceremony or group could be fined up to 50 rubles. Violations of the laws of separation of church and state were punishable under Article 142 of the Penal Code by one to three years imprisonment. Finally, the definition of such violations was expanded to include organizing religious instruction to children and carrying out religious activities that "disturbed public order".
- Pope Paul VI issued changes in traditional Roman Catholic laws concerning interfaith marriage, repealing the rule that a non-Catholic partner would have to sign a promise to raise children born of the marriage in the Catholic faith, as well as ending the penalty of excommunication of Catholics for unapproved marriage outside the faith. Other requirements, such as having a Catholic priest perform the marriage in order for it to be recognized, remained in place.
- All 30 persons aboard United Arab Airlines Flight 749 were killed when the plane crashed while attempting to land in Cairo during a sandstorm. The final conclusion would be that a defect in the altimeter caused the crew to misjudge their altitude, and that the right wing of the plane struck sand dunes as it made its approach.
- The first regular trans-Atlantic container ship service was inaugurated as United States Lines dispatched the American Racer from New York to Europe, with a cargo of 50 containers.
- Born:
  - Jerry Cantrell, American guitarist, lead guitarist, co-lead vocalist, and main songwriter of the rock band Alice in Chains; in Tacoma, Washington
  - Peter Jones, British entrepreneur; in Maidenhead, Berkshire

== March 19, 1966 (Saturday) ==
- In a game described as "a turning point in modern sports history", in the NCAA basketball championship, the nearly all-black Texas Western University Miners team upset the number-one ranked (and all-white) University of Kentucky Wildcats, 72–65, at College Park, Maryland. Texas Western Coach Don Haskins took the unprecedented step of pitting five African-American starters against Adolph Rupp's five-man starting lineup. "Racial myths that believed that an all-black team would descend into chaos without the steady guidance of at least one white player were shattered," another observer has noted, adding, "To remain competitive now required recruiting the best players regardless of race... The players from Texas Western did not pioneer the integration of college basketball, but they did put the final nail in segregated basketball's coffin." The game would be dramatized forty years later in the film Glory Road.
- A preseason exhibition baseball game at the Houston Astrodome marked the first test of Astroturf, a substitute for grass made of synthetic nylon fibers. The Los Angeles Dodgers, who beat the Houston Astros, 8–3, would also meet for the regular baseball season opener on Astroturf on April 18.
- Paul Vanden Boeynants was inaugurated as Prime Minister of Belgium, succeeding Pierre Harmel, also of Belgium's Social Christian Party. Boeyants was part of a new coalition government formed by the Social Christians and the Liberal Party.
- At 12:01 Washington time, an embargo against American trade with the white-minority ruled nation of Rhodesia began, on orders of the U.S. Commerce Department. Exceptions were made only for humanitarian, educational or medical needs.
- NASA announced the astronaut assignments for the Gemini 11 mission set for September. The prime crew would be command pilot Charles Conrad, Jr., and pilot Richard F. Gordon, Jr., and the backup crew would be Neil A. Armstrong, command pilot, and William A. Anders, pilot. The backup crew for the Gemini 10 mission James A. Lovell, Jr., and Edwin E. Aldrin, Jr., were reassigned as backup for Gemini 9, and Alan L. Bean and Clifton C. Williams, Jr., replaced them as backup crew for Gemini 10.

== March 20, 1966 (Sunday) ==
- A 6.8 magnitude earthquake that killed 156 people struck near the border between Uganda and the former French Congo, collapsing all but one building in the town of Bundibugyo in the Kabarole District and the traditional kingdom of Toro. The quake killed 104 Ugandans, and another 52 Congolese. The quake struck 18 days after Prince Patrick David Matthew Kaboyo was crowned as Olimi III, the Omukama of Toro. The last earthquake in the area had been a few days after the coronation of Olimi's father and predecessor, George Rukidi as Rukidi III of Toro.
- The FIFA World Cup Trophy was stolen from an exhibition at the Central Hall Westminster in London. Called "the world's most prized trophy" and insured for £37,000 (at the time, $84,000), the nine-pound, solid gold "World Cup" was taken from a locked and guarded exhibition room at some point between 11:00 and noon, coming in through an unattended elevator. The trophy would be found, unharmed, in a garden on March 27.
- The Convention on Fishing and Conservation of the Living Resources of the High Seas, signed in Geneva on April 29, 1958, entered into force after 22 nations had ratified it.

== March 21, 1966 (Monday) ==
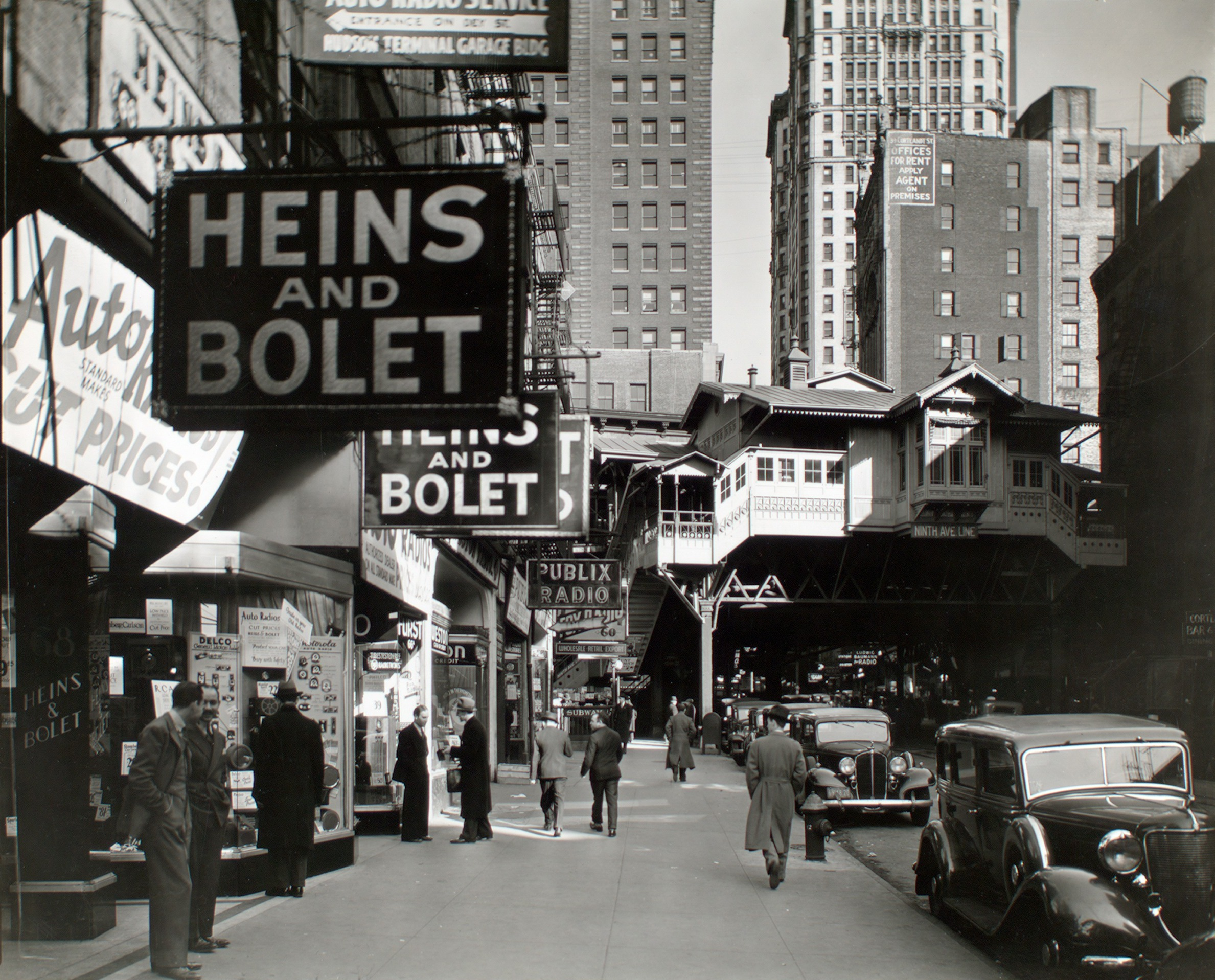
Radio Row

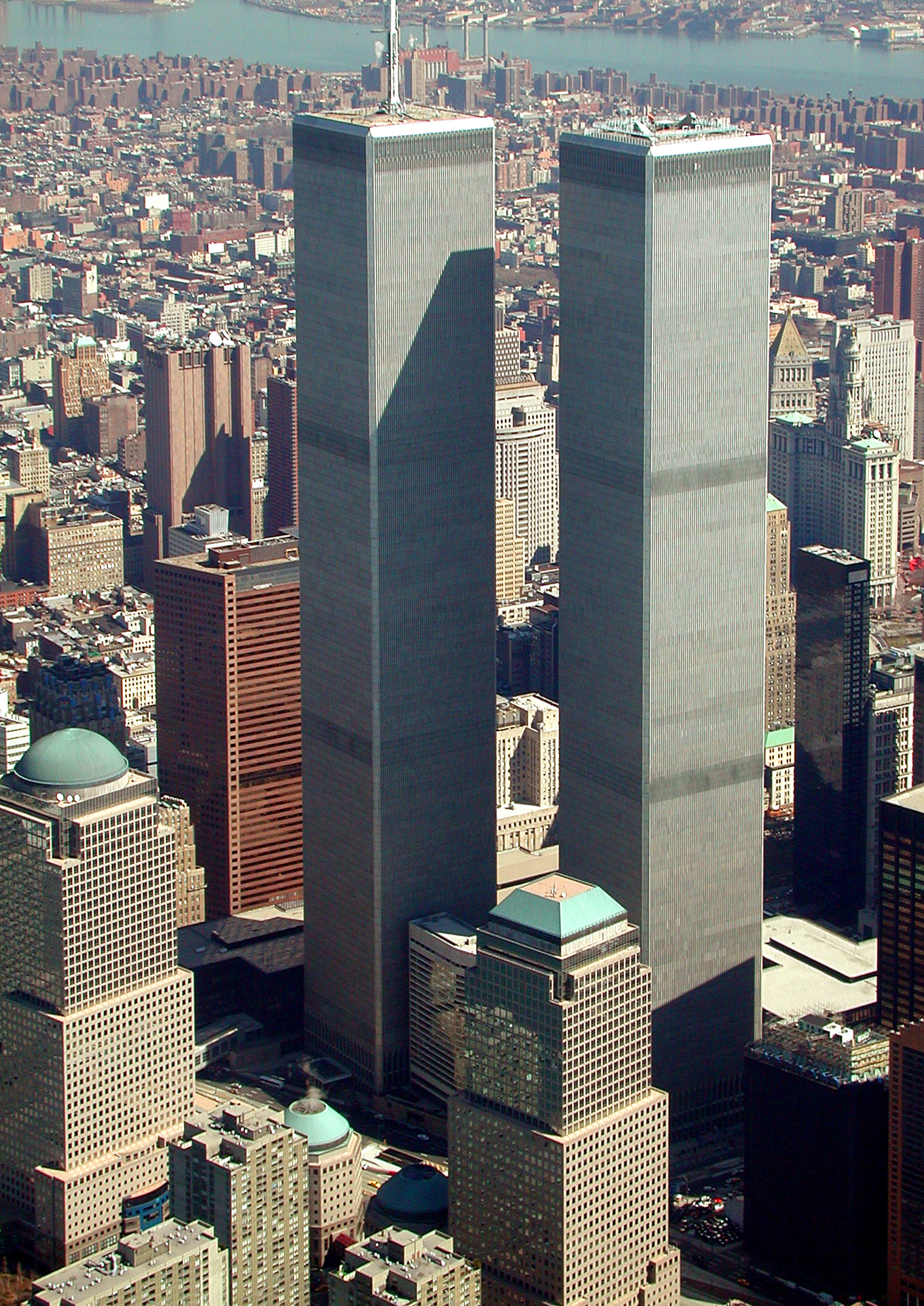
World Trade Center

- In New York City, the Ajax Wrecking and Lumber Corporation began the long-awaited demolition of the first of 26 buildings on Manhattan's "Radio Row" (named for the many electronics stores on Cortlandt Street and nearby warehouses) in order to make way for construction of the planned Twin Towers of the World Trade Center.
- Voting was held for the 200 seats in Finland's parliament, the Eduskunta. Prime Minister Johannes Virolainen's Centre Party lost its plurality, while the Social Democratic Party of Rafael Paasio gained 17 seats and the opportunity to put together a "popular front" government of the Social Democrats, Centrists, Communists and Social Democratic opposition.
- In one of the more well-known unidentified flying object incidents of the 1960s in the U.S., 87 students at a women's dormitory at Hillsdale College in Hillsdale, Michigan, along with the county Civil Defense director William E. Van Horn, observed a bright glowing object in the sky that momentarily touched down at a nearby field before departing again. Van Horn determined that the area had significantly higher radiation levels than the surrounding terrain and was contaminated with the element boron.
- NASA announced astronaut assignments for the first crewed Apollo launch, AS-204, commonly referred to as Apollo 1. Selected for the ill-fated AS-204 mission were Gus Grissom, Ed White and Roger Chaffee. Senior pilot White was replacing Donn F. Eisele, who had suffered a shoulder injury.
- The ABC broadcast the final original episode of the popular TV medical drama Ben Casey.

== March 22, 1966 (Tuesday) ==
- Led by Lazarus Sakaria and Helao Shityuwete, the first guerrillas of the South West Africa People's Organization (SWAPO) crossed the Okavango River from Portuguese Angola into what is now Namibia, referred to at the time as the protectorate of South West Africa, in the first steps of a successful fight to win independence from the control of the government of South Africa. All but one of them would be captured within a few days.
- In Washington, D.C., United States, General Motors President James M. Roche appeared before a Senate subcommittee and apologized to consumer advocate Ralph Nader for the company's intimidation and harassment campaign against him.

== March 23, 1966 (Wednesday) ==
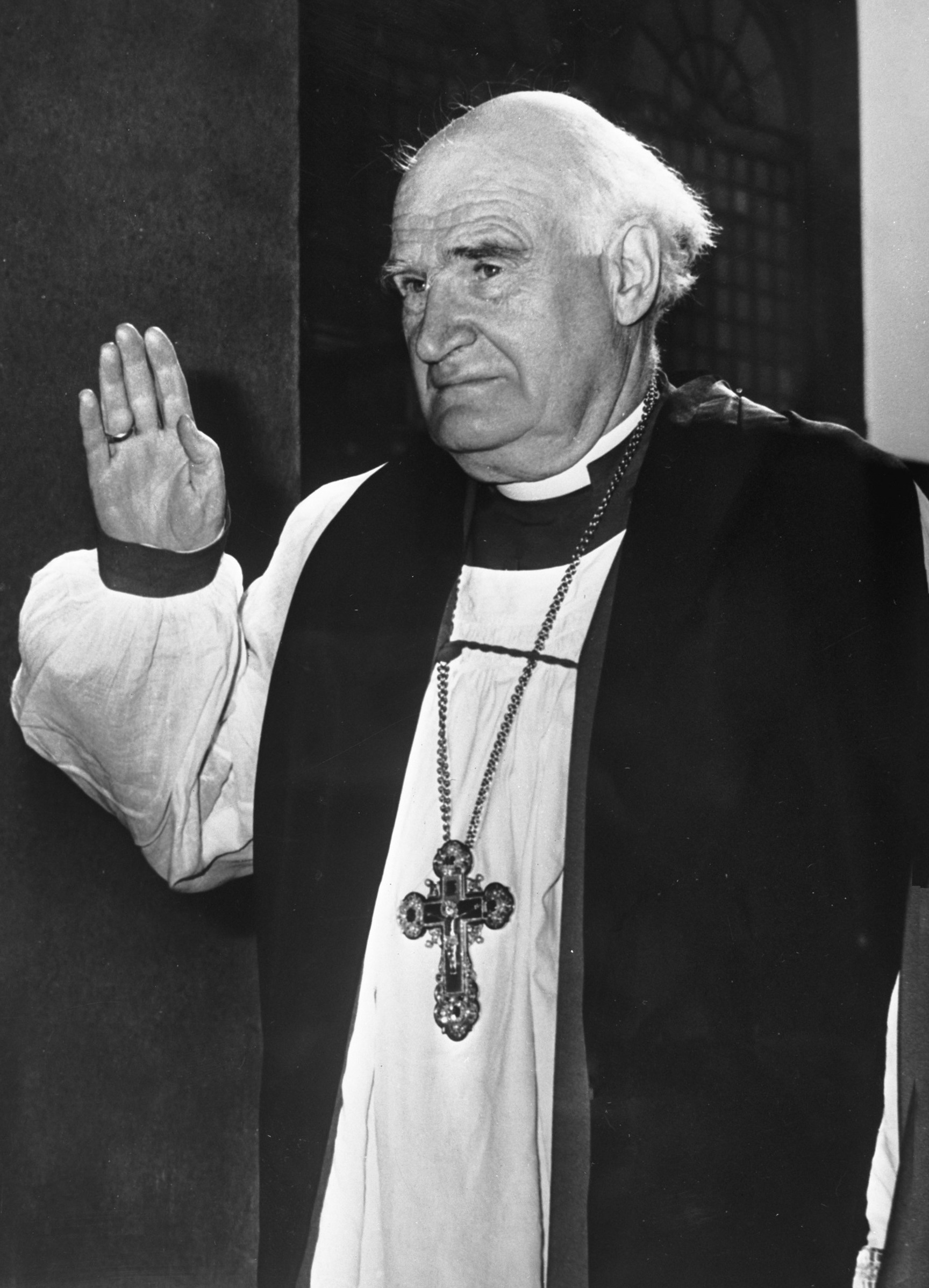
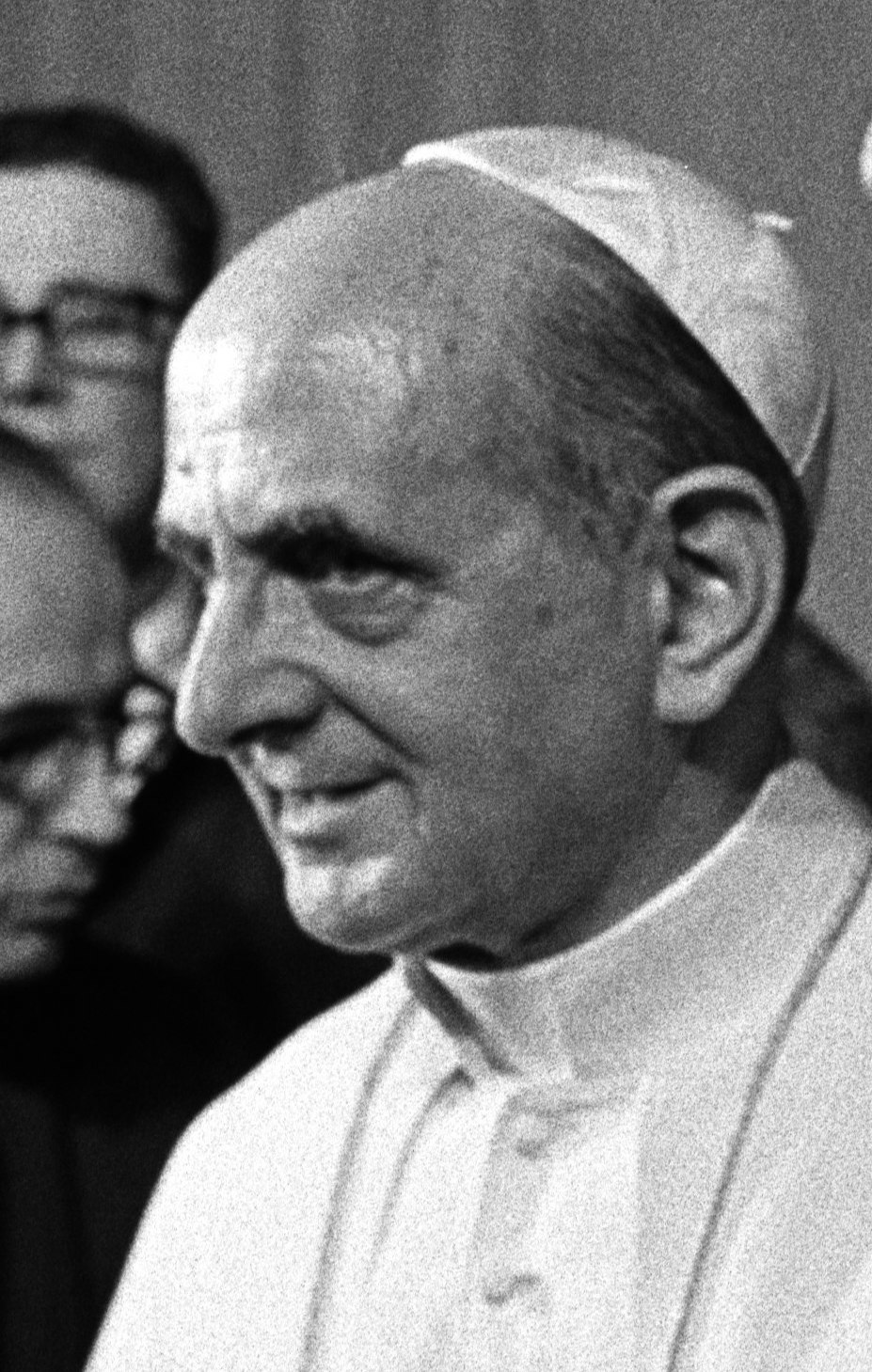
Archbishop Ramsey and Pope Paul VI
- For the first time in 400 years, the spiritual leaders of the Roman Catholic Church and the Church of England met openly, as Pope Paul VI received the Archbishop of Canterbury, Michael Ramsey, in Rome. The following day, they issued "The Common Declaration", pledging to inaugurate between their followers "a serious dialogue which, founded on the Gospels and on the ancient common traditions, may lead to that unity in truth, for which Christ prayed". Before parting, the two men exchanged rings, and by tradition, "every time an Archbishop of Canterbury meets the Pope, he wears Pope Paul VI's ring". It marked the first discussion concerning unity between the Catholic and Anglican churches since the English Reformation had been completed in 1534, although Ramsey's predecessor, Geoffrey Fisher, had met privately with Pope John XXIII on December 2, 1960.
- NASA released the first schedule of the Apollo Applications Program (AAP), announcing plans for 26 Saturn IB and 19 Saturn V AAP launches, in addition to the ten crewed lunar landings ranging from Apollo 11 to Apollo 20. Among the AAP launches would be three "S-IVB/Spent-Stage Experiment Support Modules" (i.e., "wet" Workshops), three Saturn V-boosted orbital laboratories, and four Apollo telescope mounts. The initial AAP launch was slated for April 1968.

== March 24, 1966 (Thursday) ==
- Israel began its first regular television broadcasts at 12:15 p.m., local time, as Israeli Educational Television transmitted black-and-white programming to sixty designated classrooms. Fifteen minutes after the announced noon start, blank sets "suddenly flickered to life with the single message: 'Educational Television Trust— Channel 8'". Minister of Education and Culture M.K. Zahman Aren then welcomed all viewers. By 1966, there were more than 40,000 televisions in Israel, but most had been receiving broadcasts from neighboring Jordan. Initial programming would be limited two hours each evening, and 25 minutes of late afternoon children's shows.
- The U.S. Supreme Court issued its decision in Harper v. Virginia State Board of Elections, holding that poll taxes, payment required at one time in 11 Southern states in order to cast a vote, were unconstitutional in elections at any level, because they violated the Equal Protection Clause of the 14th Amendment. Since 1964, poll taxes had been barred for federal elections (in presidential and Congressional elections) by the 24th Amendment to the U.S. Constitution, and the ruling prohibited their use for state and local elections. By 1966, only Virginia, Texas, Alabama and Mississippi still collected a poll tax.
- Died: Virginia Hill, 49, organized crime figure and former girlfriend of gangster Bugsy Siegel, died from an overdose of sleeping pills.

== March 25, 1966 (Friday) ==
- The Sports Car Club of America debuted the first true road racing series in the United States, the Trans Am Series, starting at the Sebring International Raceway in Florida with the first of seven scheduled races. Officially, the series was referred to as the "Trans-American Sedan Championship", because the races (starting with the "Four Hour Governor's Cup Race for Sedans") would be held across the United States in venues between Florida and California, but it was popularly called "The Trans-Am". Foremost of the 44 drivers in the opener was Indy-car champion A. J. Foyt, behind the wheel of a Ford Mustang, but Austrian Grand Prix driver Jochen Rindt would win the opener.
- Pravir Chandra Bhanj Deo, popular first as the Maharaja of the Bastar state in British India, and as a wealthy tribal leader after independence, was shot and killed by local police on the steps of his palace in Jagdalpur. According to the official account, police had been escorting a prisoner to a lockup inside the palace when a riot broke out; as police were firing at a crowd running through the palace grounds, Pravir Chandra came out to see what was happening and was accidentally caught in the gunfire. His adherents believed that he was assassinated on the orders of Dwarka Prasad Mishra, the Chief Minister of Madhya Pradesh.
- The U.S. Navy's Carl Brashear, who had become the first African-American salvage diver in the navy and who aspired to become a master diver, was severely injured as the USS Hoist (ARS-40) was working to recover the American hydrogen bomb that had fallen into the Mediterranean Sea during the Palomares incident. A towing line broke, causing a loose pipe to shatter Brashear's leg, which would ultimately be amputated. Nevertheless, Brashear would pursue his ambition and, in 1970, become the Navy's first black master diver.
- Five members of an international Alpine climbing team became the first mountain climbers to complete the 6,000-foot (1,800 m) climb up the vertical wall of the north face of the Eiger in Switzerland. Three days earlier, American team captain John Harlin had been at 11,500 feet (3,500 m) when a rock severed his climbing rope, and he fell 3,000 feet (910 m) to his death.
- MSC Director Robert R. Gilruth expressed his misgivings about the Apollo Applications Program, questioned whether the existing AAP represented the best approach to the future of human spaceflight in his letter to the Associate Administrator for Manned Space Flight, George E. Mueller. Gilruth proposed using Apollo hardware with only minimal modifications (especially for the two Apollo spacecraft), and called for early definition of the next human spaceflight program. Merely maintaining the rate of production and flights of Apollo, Gilruth wrote, "without planning for a new major program, and without significant research and development as part of AAP, will not maintain the momentum we have achieved in the manned spaceflight program."
- The Roman Catholic Diocese of Mexicali was erected as a suffragan diocese of the Archdiocese of Hermosillo.
- Born:
  - Tom Glavine, American baseball player; in Concord, Massachusetts
  - Jeff Healey, Canadian blues musician; in Toronto (died of sarcoma, 2008)

== March 26, 1966 (Saturday) ==
- Protesters in dozens of American cities and in other nations countries began the second "Days of International Protest" against the Vietnam War. The two day protest was sponsored by the National Coordinating Committee to End the War in Vietnam. In New York, 20,000 people marched down New York City's Fifth Avenue after a rally in Central Park, while a crowd of 2,000 paraded down State Street in Chicago. In Boston, about 2,000 protested peacefully until someone in the crowd began throwing eggs at the police and, as MIT Professor Noam Chomsky would later recall, "they cleared everybody away in about three seconds". Marches also took place in Washington, San Francisco, Denver, Atlanta, Oklahoma City, and Hartford. The protests were the largest against the war up to that time, involving an estimated 100,000 people in total across 100 U.S. cities and other countries.
- Four spectators at the 12 Hours of Sebring race in Sebring, Florida, were killed, and four others injured, when a Ferrari car driven by Mario Andretti struck a Porsche driven by Don Wester, sending Wester's car through a fence and into the stands. A man and his two sons were dead at the scene, and a woman died of her injuries at a hospital. Earlier in the race, Canadian Driving Champion Bob McLean was killed in a fiery crash when he lost control in a hairpin turn and struck a utility pole.
- Beijing Mayor Peng Zhen became one of the first major casualties of the Cultural Revolution, when he disappeared from public view after co-writing the "February Outline" and disagreeing with the objectives of Party Chairman Mao Zedong.
- After being in a coma since having a stroke on February 2, Turkey's President Cemal Gürsel was removed from office by vote of the Grand National Assembly.

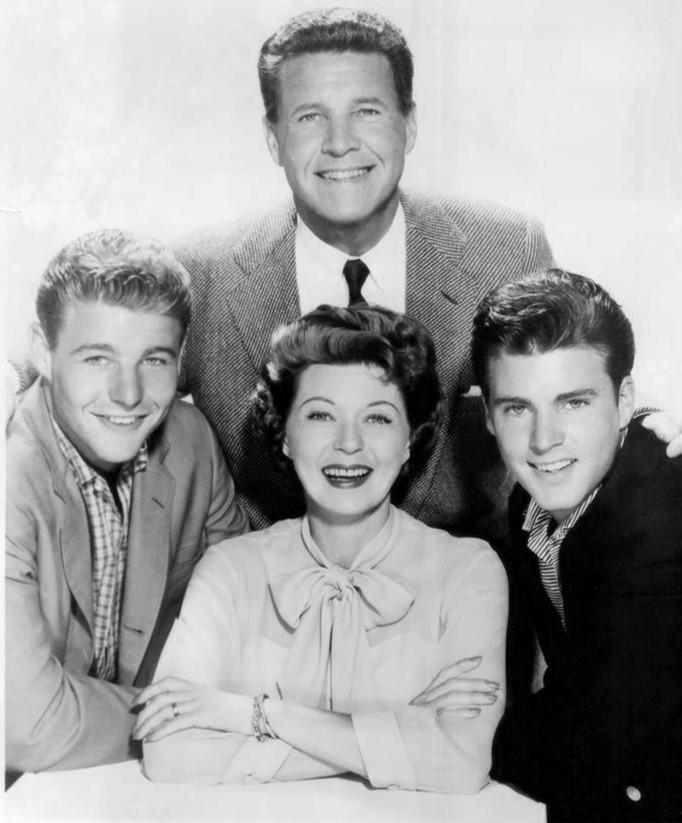
Ozzie and Harriet and family

- After 14 seasons, the ABC television series The Adventures of Ozzie and Harriet, the network's third-oldest prime time show, telecast its last original episode. The network brought an end to many of its evening programs that would be considered classics in later years, including Ben Casey, McHale's Navy, The Donna Reed Show, The Addams Family, The Patty Duke Show and Gidget. Starring the family of bandleader Ozzie Nelson, his wife, and their sons David and Ricky, portraying themselves, the TV series had started as a radio show on October 8, 1944.

== March 27, 1966 (Sunday) ==
- Wrapped in newspapers, the missing Jules Rimet Trophy was found in South London by a mongrel dog named "Pickles", who was being walked by his owner David Corbett. "I was just taking Pickles for his Sunday evening walk," Corbett told reporters. "We came out of the house into the garden, and I was just about to put the lead on him when I noticed he was sniffing at something on the path" at the Corbett home at Beulah Hill at South Norwood. The find yielded a reward of £10,000 ($17,000).
- Indonesia's new cabinet lineup, agreed between Suharto and Sukarno, was announced. It included Suharto himself as interim deputy prime minister for security and defense affairs, the Sultan of Yogyakarta Sri Sultan Hamengkubuwono IX as deputy prime minister for economic, financial and development affairs, and Adam Malik as deputy prime minister for social and political affairs, whose job it would be to manage foreign policy.
- In South Vietnam, 20,000 Buddhists marched in demonstrations against the policies of the military government.

== March 28, 1966 (Monday) ==
- In a kidnapping that would remain unsolved for more than 55 years, high school senior Daniel Jess Goldman was taken from his home in Surfside, Florida, the day before his 18th birthday. A gunman broke into the home of Aaron Goldman, a wealthy Miami building contractor, at 5:00 in the morning, tied up the Goldman parents, demanded $10,000 in cash and then left, taking Daniel with him and demanding that they deliver $25,000 ransom the next day, warning them, "or you'll never see your son alive again". Danny's car was found the next day in a bank parking lot, but when the Goldmans were called that night, the person on the other end said nothing and the parents were not called again. As the search continued, police revealed that the kidnapper had told Aaron Goldman, "You don't remember me now, but you cheated me. I'm here to get even." Danny Goldman was never heard from again and his body was never found, but the Miami-Dade Police Department reopened the case in 2012. In 2021, the kidnapper was identified as the late George Defeis, who had carried out the kidnapping and murder two days after Aaron Goldman had testified against the Trafficante crime family.
- In the case of United States v. Price, the United States Supreme Court unanimously ruled that federal civil rights criminal charges were not limited to "officers of the State" (state and local government officials) but applied also to any "willful participant in joint activity with the State or its agents". Indictments of 15 of the 18 people charged with conspiracy to the 1964 murder of civil rights workers, Michael Schwerner, Andrew Goodman and James Chaney in Neshoba County, Mississippi, had been dismissed because they had been private individuals. That evening, with the indictments of defendants in other cases now upheld, the FBI arrested 13 members of the White Knights of the Ku Klux Klan in Jones County, Mississippi, for the January killing of Vernon Dahmer.
- The Grand National Assembly of Turkey elected Cevdet Sunay the fifth president of Turkey, as the replacement for the incapacitated Cemal Gürsel. Sunay would serve for seven years until March 28, 1973.
- Born: Salt (stage name for Cheryl Renee James), American rapper of the female hip hop group Salt-N-Pepa; in Brooklyn

== March 29, 1966 (Tuesday) ==
- After a week of nationwide labor strikes and rioting by students, the ruling military junta quietly departed the Government Palace in Quito and took refuge at a farm outside of town. Rear Admiral Ramón Castro Jijón resigned as President of Ecuador, along with the other two junta members who had ruled Ecuador since 1963, General Marcos Gandara and General Luis Cabrera. After word of their departure spread, municipal and provincial officials quit and police walked off of the job, while the remaining military commanders sent troops as a show of force in the nation's largest cities until a new president could be selected. Former Presidents Galo Plaza Lasso and Camilo Ponce suggested economics professor Clemente Yerovi for the job. Professor Yerovi was sworn into office the next day at 12:30 p.m., a day and a half after the presidency had been vacant.
- In what one author would later describe as "a psychiatrist's worst nightmare", University of Texas student Charles Whitman confided to the University Health Center staff psychiatrist, Dr. Maurice D. Heatly, about a recurring fantasy of "going up on the Tower" (the observation deck of the 30-story Main Building that overlooked the campus) "and shooting people". Dr. Heatly scheduled Whitman for a follow-up appointment, but prescribed no medication. Four months later, on August 1, the former U.S. Marine would use his sniper training and shoot 42 people, 15 of them fatally, in addition to five others murdered earlier in the day. "Second guessing Dr. Heatly would have been extraordinarily easy on 2 August 1966," it would later be noted, but there was little basis at the time for an involuntary commitment to a mental hospital.
- In a fight for the world heavyweight boxing championship, George Chuvalo of Canada became the first challenger to go a full 15 rounds against champion Muhammad Ali, who had a 22–0 record in professional boxing. Chuvalo, who had a record of 34-11 (and two draws) and had never been KO'd, "absorbed every punch" in front of 13,540 fans in Toronto, but lost a unanimous decision (73–65, 74–63 and 74–62) by the judges. Afterwards, Ali praised Chuvalo, commenting that "George's head is the hardest thing I ever punched... I had to back off because he's so strong and you just wear yourself out against a guy like that."
- The 23rd Congress of the Communist Party of the Soviet Union, the first party congress in five years, was opened by First Secretary Leonid Brezhnev and lasted for eleven days. The most significant action taken was to create the office of General Secretary of the Party (abolished in 1934), restore the name "Politburo" (which had changed to "Presidium" under Joseph Stalin) to the highest level of leadership over the Party, and to reduce the number of Politburo members from 25 to 11.
- The musical comedy It's a Bird...It's a Plane...It's Superman opened on Broadway at the Alvin Theatre, with music by Charles Strouse and lyrics by Lee Adams, and Bob Holiday in the title role. Despite receiving three Tony Award nominations, the production would run for only 129 performances and close on July 17, 1966.

== March 30, 1966 (Wednesday) ==
- White voters in South Africa overwhelmingly favored the National Party, led by Prime Minister Hendrik Verwoerd, capturing 126 of the 166 seats. At the time, roughly 20 percent of the adults in South Africa were allowed to vote, while the 68 percent who were black were ineligible. Persons classified as "Coloured" were allowed to vote for the four seats (all uncontested in 1966) that were reserved for their White representatives.
- Died:
  - Maxfield Parrish, American painter (b. 1870)
  - Erwin Piscator, 72, German theatre director and producer

== March 31, 1966 (Thursday) ==
- The British Labour Party led by Prime Minister Harold Wilson won the United Kingdom General Election, gaining 48 seats in the House of Commons while the Conservative Party lost 52. The shift increased the Labour Party's majority to 364–253 over the Conservatives, up from a slim majority of 316 seats in the 630-seat Commons. Gerry Fitt of Northern Ireland won the first seat ever for the new Republican Labour Party, while the Liberal Party increased to 12 seats.
- In an extremely close race in the British Commons election, Conservative Sir Harmar Nicholls retained his seat for the Peterborough constituency by only three votes over Labour candidate, Michael Ward, winning 23,944 votes to 23,941 after seven recounts. Ward would lose to Nicholls in February 1974 by a margin of only 22 votes (20,353 to 20,331) before winning in October of the same year by 1,848 votes.
- At 10:47 a.m. UTC, the Soviet Union launched Luna 10 on a three-day journey to be the first to place a human-made object into orbit around the Moon.
- The deadline ended for the first enrollment in the new Medicare program of health insurance in the United States.

== Bibliography ==
- Topmiller, Robert J. (2006). The Lotus Unleashed: The Buddhist Peace Movement in South Vietnam, 1964–1966. Lexington, Kentucky: University Press of Kentucky. ISBN 0-8131-9166-1.
