= List of earthquakes in 1966 =

Earthquakes in 1966
Approximate epicenters of the earthquakes in 1966
- 4.0–5.9 magnitude
- 6.0–6.9 magnitude
- 7.0–7.9 magnitude
- 8.0+ magnitude
- Strongest magnitude: Peru, off the coast of central Peru (Magnitude 8.1) October 17
- Deadliest: China, Hebei Province (Magnitude 6.8) March 22 8,064 deaths
- Total fatalities: 10,000+

Number by magnitude
- 9.0+: 0

This is a list of earthquakes in 1966. Only magnitude 6.0 or greater earthquakes appear on the list. Lower magnitude events are included if they have caused death, injury or damage. Events which occurred in remote areas will be excluded from the list as they wouldn't have generated significant media interest. All dates are listed according to UTC time. Maximum intensities are indicated on the Mercalli intensity scale and are sourced from United States Geological Survey (USGS) ShakeMap data. With only 9 events above magnitude 7.0+ this was a fairly quiet year. The largest event was in Peru in October and measured 8.1. Turkey had the deadliest event of the year when in August a magnitude 6.8 earthquake caused nearly 2,400 deaths. China had a number of deadly earthquakes especially in March. DR Congo also had an earthquake in March which resulted in 140 deaths. Japan and large portions of Indonesia were notably quiet this year.

== Overall ==
=== By death toll ===
Rank	Death toll	Magnitude	Location	MMI	Depth (km)	Date
1	8,064	6.8	China, Hebei Province	X (Extreme)	20.0	March 22
2	2,394	6.8	Turkey, Mus Province	IX (Violent)	24.7	August 19
3	140	6.6	DR Congo, North Kivu	VIII (Severe)	29.3	March 20
4	125	8.1	Peru, off the coast of central Peru	IX (Violent)	40.0	October 17
5	101	6.5	China, Hebei Province	IX (Violent)	25.0	March 7
6	80	6.0	Nepal, Sudurpashchim Province	VIII (Severe)	25.9	June 27
7	15	5.6	India, Uttar Pradesh	VII (Very strong)	27.0	August 15
8	12	4.6	Turkey, Mus Province	( )	64.0	July 12
9	10	6.0	Turkey, Mus Province	VIII (Severe)	38.0	March 7
9	10	5.1	Soviet Union, Tashkent Region, Uzbekistan	VII (Very strong)	3 ~8	April 26

- Note: At least 10 casualties

=== By magnitude ===
Rank	Magnitude	Death toll	Location	MMI	Depth (km)	Date
1	8.1	125	Peru, off the coast of central Peru	IX (Violent)	40.0	October 17
2	7.8	0	United Kingdom, Santa Cruz Islands, Solomon Islands	VII (Very strong)	55.0	December 31
= 3	7.7	0	Indonesia, Morotai	VII (Very strong)	115.0	September 8
= 3	7.7	3	Chile, Antofagasta Region	IX (Violent)	25.0	December 28
4	7.5	7	Taiwan, off the east coast of Taiwan	VII (Very strong)	30.0	March 12
= 5	7.1	0	United Kingdom, British Solomon Islands	VI (Strong)	45.0	June 15
= 5	7.1	0	United Kingdom, Santa Cruz Islands, Solomon Islands	VI (Strong)	35.0	December 31
= 6	7.0	0	Indonesia, Banda Sea	III (Weak)	531.8	June 22
= 6	7.0	0	central Mid-Atlantic Ridge	( )	15.0	October 19

- Note: At least 7.0 magnitude

== Notable events ==
=== January ===
January
- Strongest magnitude: 6.0 M_{w} 2 events
- Total fatalities: 0

Number by magnitude
- 8.0–8.9: 0
- 7.0–7.9: 0
- 6.0–6.9: 2
- 5.0–5.9: 1

Date	Country and location	M_{w}	Depth (km)	MMI	Notes	Casualties	
Date	Country and location	M_{w}	Depth (km)	MMI	Notes	Dead	Injured
11	Japan, off the south coast of Honshu	6.0	15.0				
28	New Hebrides, Vanuatu	6.0	10.0	VII			
31	China, Yunnan Province	5.1	0.0	VII	Some homes were destroyed. Unknown depth.		

=== February ===
February
- Strongest magnitude: 6.9 M_{w} Australia, Papua and New Guinea
- Deadliest: 6.2 M_{w} Greece; 1 death
- Total fatalities: 1

Number by magnitude
- 8.0–8.9: 0
- 7.0–7.9: 0
- 6.0–6.9: 9
- 5.0–5.9: 1

Date	Country and location	M_{w}	Depth (km)	MMI	Notes	Casualties	
Date	Country and location	M_{w}	Depth (km)	MMI	Notes	Dead	Injured
4	New Hebrides, Vanuatu	6.4	180.0	IV			
5	Greece, Central Greece (region)	6.2	10.0	VII	1 person died and 60 people were injured. 450 homes were destroyed. Property damage costs were $4 million (1966 rate).	1	60
5	China, Yunnan Province	6.4	10.0	IX	Many homes were destroyed.		
7	Pakistan, Baluchistan, Pakistan	6.5	10.0	rowspan="2"| Doublet earthquake.			
7	Pakistan, Punjab, Pakistan	6.5	10.0	VIII			
10	United States, Northern Mariana Islands	6.5	45.7				
13	Indonesia, Tanimbar Islands	6.0	35.0				
13	China, Yunnan Province	5.9	10.0	VII	Aftershock of February 5 event. Some homes were destroyed.		
16	New Hebrides, Vanuatu	6.6	35.0	VI			
22	Australia, East New Britain Province, Papua and New Guinea	6.9	35.0	VI			

=== March ===
March
- Strongest magnitude: 7.5 M_{w} Taiwan
- Deadliest: 6.6 M_{w} DR Congo; 140 death
- Total fatalities: 359

Number by magnitude
- 8.0–8.9: 0
- 7.0–7.9: 1
- 6.0–6.9: 11
- 5.0–5.9: 2

Date	Country and location	M_{w}	Depth (km)	MMI	Notes	Casualties	
Date	Country and location	M_{w}	Depth (km)	MMI	Notes	Dead	Injured
6	China, Hebei Province	5.2	0.0	VII	11 homes were destroyed. Unknown depth. This was a foreshock to a series of large and destructive events over the coming weeks.		
6	China, western Xizang Province	6.7	20.0	VII			
6	China, western Xizang Province	6.3	20.0	VII	Aftershock.		
7	Turkey, Mus Province	6.0	38.0	VIII	10 people were killed and major damage was caused.	10	
7	China, Hebei Province	6.5	25.0	IX	At least 101 people were killed and extensive damage was caused in the 1966 Xingtai earthquakes.	101+	
12	Taiwan, off the east coast	7.5	30.0	VII	The 1966 Hualien earthquake left 7 people dead and 10 injured. Some homes were destroyed.	7	10
17	United Kingdom, Fiji	6.7	625.0				
19	China, Hebei Province	5.6	0.0	VI	Some homes were destroyed. Unknown depth. Aftershock of March 7 event. Foreshock of March 22 event.		
20	DR Congo, North Kivu	6.6	29.3	VIII	140 people were killed and at least 101 injured in the 1966 Toro earthquake. Property damage costs were $1.5 million (1966 rate).	140	101+
22	China, Hebei Province	6.2	20.0	VII	Foreshock.		
22	China, Hebei Province	6.8	20.0	X	The 1966 Xingtai earthquakes caused at least 101 deaths and further damage.	101+	
23	Taiwan, off the east coast	6.2	49.5	V			
26	China, Hebei Province	6.0	20.0	VII	Some homes were destroyed. Aftershock.		
29	China, Hebei Province	6.0	20.0	VII	Aftershock.		

=== April ===
April
- Strongest magnitude: 6.5 M_{w} Indonesia
- Deadliest: 5.1 M_{w} Soviet Union, Uzbekistan; 10 deaths
- Total fatalities: 10

Number by magnitude
- 8.0–8.9: 0
- 7.0–7.9: 0
- 6.0–6.9: 7
- 5.0–5.9: 2

Date	Country and location	M_{w}	Depth (km)	MMI	Notes	Casualties	
Date	Country and location	M_{w}	Depth (km)	MMI	Notes	Dead	Injured
8	Soviet Union, off the east coast of Kamchatka	6.2	46.6	VI			
10	Chile, Coquimbo Region	6.1	60.5	VI			
12	Chile, Araucania Region	6.2	35.0	VII			
16	United States, Kodiak Island, Alaska	6.2	15.0				
20	China, Hebei Province	5.3	0.0		22 homes were destroyed. Unknown depth. Aftershock of March 22 event.		
20	Soviet Union, Dagestan, Russia	6.0	20.0	VII			
23	Indonesia, Gulf of Tomini	6.5	20.0	VII			
23	Indonesia, Gulf of Tomini	6.1	35.0	V	Aftershock.		
26	Soviet Union, Tashkent Region, Uzbekistan	5.1	3.0~8.0	VII	The 1966 Tashkent earthquake caused 10 deaths and major damage. Costs were $300 million (1966 rate). It is unknown if the depth is correct or not.	10	

=== May ===
May
- Strongest magnitude: 6.4 M_{w} Peru
- Total fatalities: 0

Number by magnitude
- 8.0–8.9: 0
- 7.0–7.9: 0
- 6.0–6.9: 4

Date	Country and location	M_{w}	Depth (km)	MMI	Notes	Casualties	
Date	Country and location	M_{w}	Depth (km)	MMI	Notes	Dead	Injured
1	Peru, Ucayali Region	6.4	161.0	IV			
2	Australia, West New Britain Province, Papua and New Guinea	6.1	35.0	V			
5	Taiwan, off the east coast	6.2	50.0	V			
9	Greece, southeast of Crete	6.0	25.0				

=== June ===
June
- Strongest magnitude: 7.1 M_{w} United Kingdom, Solomon
- Deadliest: 6.0 M_{w} Nepal; 80 deaths
- Total fatalities: 80

Number by magnitude
- 8.0–8.9: 0
- 7.0–7.9: 2
- 6.0–6.9: 9
- 5.0–5.9: 0

Date	Country and location	M_{w}	Depth (km)	MMI	Notes	Casualties	
Date	Country and location	M_{w}	Depth (km)	MMI	Notes	Dead	Injured
6	Afghanistan, Badakhshan Province	6.6	215.6	IV			
6	Philippines, east of Mindanao	6.0	25.0	V			
7	Peru, off the coast of central	6.2	20.0	VI			
7	United States, State of Yap, Federated States of Micronesia	6.8	35.0				
13	United Kingdom, Santa Cruz Islands, British Solomon Islands	6.7	241.6				
15	United Kingdom, Solomon Islands	7.1	45.0	VI			
15	United Kingdom, British Solomon Islands	6.8	45.0	VII	Aftershock.		
22	Indonesia, Banda Sea	7.0	531.8	III			
27	Nepal, Sudurpashchim Province	6.0	25.9	VIII	80 people were killed and 100 were injured. 5,200 homes were destroyed. Damage costs were $1 million (1966 rate). Foreshock.	80	100
27	Nepal, Sudurpashchim Province	6.3	25.0	VI			
29	New Hebrides, Vanuatu	6.0	45.0				

=== July ===
July
- Strongest magnitude: 6.8 M_{w} United States
- Deadliest: 4.6 M_{w} Turkey; 12 deaths
- Total fatalities: 12

Number by magnitude
- 8.0–8.9: 0
- 7.0–7.9: 0
- 6.0–6.9: 3
- 5.0–5.9: 0

Date	Country and location	M_{w}	Depth (km)	MMI	Notes	Casualties	
Date	Country and location	M_{w}	Depth (km)	MMI	Notes	Dead	Injured
1	Taiwan, off the east coast	6.4	112.5	V			
4	United States, Rat Islands, Alaska	6.8	15.0	III			
10	Japan, Ryukyu Islands	6.1	35.6				
12	Turkey, Mus Province	4.6	64.0		12 people were killed and 20 were injured. Major damage was caused.	12	20

=== August ===
August
- Strongest magnitude: 6.9 M_{w} 2 events
- Deadliest: 6.8 M_{w} Turkey; 2,394 deaths
- Total fatalities: 2,409

Number by magnitude
- 8.0–8.9: 0
- 7.0–7.9: 0
- 6.0–6.9: 10
- 5.0–5.9: 1

Date	Country and location	M_{w}	Depth (km)	MMI	Notes	Casualties	
Date	Country and location	M_{w}	Depth (km)	MMI	Notes	Dead	Injured
1	Pakistan, Baluchistan, Pakistan	6.0	20.2	VII	Foreshock.		
1	Pakistan, Baluchistan, Pakistan	6.2	25.0	VII	Foreshock.		
1	Pakistan, Baluchistan, Pakistan	6.9	25.0	VIII			
7	United States, south of the Aleutian Islands, Alaska	6.9	19.7				
7	Mexico, Gulf of California	6.5	15.0	VI			
10	Tonga	6.0	98.0				
15	India, Uttar Pradesh	5.6	27.0	VIII	15 people were killed and some damage was caused.	15	
15	Philippines, off the northeast coast of Mindoro	6.0	19.8	VI			
19	Turkey, Mus Province	6.8	24.7	IX	2,394 people were killed in the 1966 Varto earthquake. Extensive property damage was caused with costs being around $20 million (1966 rate).	2,394	
20	Turkey, Bingol Province	6.2	25.0	VII	Aftershock.		
21	Philippines, off the east coast of Mindanao	6.0	35.0	V			

=== September ===
September
- Strongest magnitude: 7.7 M_{w} Indonesia
- Deadliest: 5.9 M_{w} Greece 1 death
- Total fatalities: 1

Number by magnitude
- 8.0–8.9: 0
- 7.0–7.9: 1
- 6.0–6.9: 3
- 5.0–5.9: 3

Date	Country and location	M_{w}	Depth (km)	MMI	Notes	Casualties	
Date	Country and location	M_{w}	Depth (km)	MMI	Notes	Dead	Injured
1	Greece, Peloponnese (region)	5.9	17.0	VIII	1 person was killed and 25 were injured. Damage costs reached $14 million (1966 rate) with 180 homes collapsing.	1	25
8	Indonesia, Morotai	7.7	115.0	VII			
12	United States, northern California	5.9	10.0	VII	Some damage was reported to buildings and infrastructure in the area.		
15	Taiwan, off the east coast	6.2	30.0	V			
19	China, Yunnan Province	5.4	0.0	VII	Some damage was caused. Unknown depth.		
25	Mexico, Guerrero	6.0	80.3	V			
28	China, Yunnan Province	6.3	20.0	IX	Extensive damage was caused.		

=== October ===
October
- Strongest magnitude: 8.1 M_{w} Peru
- Deadliest: 8.1 M_{w} Peru; 125 deaths
- Total fatalities: 126

Number by magnitude
- 8.0–8.9: 1
- 7.0–7.9: 1
- 6.0–6.9: 2
- 5.0–5.9: 2

Date	Country and location	M_{w}	Depth (km)	MMI	Notes	Casualties	
Date	Country and location	M_{w}	Depth (km)	MMI	Notes	Dead	Injured
2	China, Jilin Province	5.2	0.0		Major damage was caused. Unknown depth.		
7	France, southeast of the Loyalty Islands, New Caledonia	6.9	150.0				
17	Peru, off the coast of central	8.1	40.0	IX	The 1966 Peru earthquake left 125 people dead and 3,000 injured. Major property damage was reported. Costs were $35 million (1966 rate).	125	3,000
19	central Mid-Atlantic Ridge	7.0	15.0				
27	Japan, Volcano Islands	6.7	10.0				
29	Greece, Western Greece	5.9	25.0	VII	1 person died and 23 were injured. Many homes were destroyed.	1	23

=== November ===
November
- Strongest magnitude: 6.3 M_{w} New Hebrides, Vanuatu
- Total fatalities: 0

Number by magnitude
- 8.0–8.9: 0
- 7.0–7.9: 0
- 6.0–6.9: 3

Date	Country and location	M_{w}	Depth (km)	MMI	Notes	Casualties	
Date	Country and location	M_{w}	Depth (km)	MMI	Notes	Dead	Injured
3	Mona Passage	6.0	26.5				
10	Argentina, San Juan Province, Argentina	6.1	113.0	IV			
12	New Hebrides, Vanuatu	6.3	35.0	VI			

=== December ===
December
- Strongest magnitude: 7.8 M_{w} United Kingdom, Solomon Islands
- Deadliest: 7.7 M_{w} Chile; 3 deaths
- Total fatalities: 3

Number by magnitude
- 8.0–8.9: 0
- 7.0–7.9: 3
- 6.0–6.9: 5

Date	Country and location	M_{w}	Depth (km)	MMI	Notes	Casualties	
Date	Country and location	M_{w}	Depth (km)	MMI	Notes	Dead	Injured
1	New Hebrides, Vanuatu	6.8	125.0	VI			
14	Australia, East Sepik Province, Papua and New Guinea	6.3	65.0	VI			
20	Argentina, Santiago del Estero Province	6.3	578.0				
21	New Hebrides, Vanuatu	6.3	230.0				
23	Australia, off the east coast of Papua and New Guinea	6.6	30.0	V			
28	Chile, Antofagasta Region	7.7	25.0	IX	3 people were killed and 6 were injured. Many homes were destroyed. Damage costs were $400,000 (1966 rate).	3	6
31	United Kingdom, Santa Cruz Islands, Solomon Islands	7.8	55.0	VII			
31	United Kingdom, Santa Cruz Islands, Solomon Islands	7.1	35.0	VI	Aftershock.		
