= 1966 Peru earthquake =

- Location within Peru
- UTC time: 1966-10-17 21:42:00
- ISC event: 842581
- USGS-ANSS: ComCat
- Local date: October 17, 1966
- Local time: 16:42:00
- Magnitude: 8.1 M_{w}
- Depth: 38 km (24 mi)
- Epicenter: 10.7°S 78.7°W
- Areas affected: Peru
- Max. intensity: MMI IX (Violent)
- Tsunami: Destructive
- Casualties: about 100 dead

The 1966 Peru earthquake occurred on October 17 at 16:42 local time (21:42 UTC). It had a magnitude of M_{w} 8.1. The epicenter was located offcoast near Huacho. About 100 people were reported dead. Most of the damage was recorded in low buildings. Cracks were reported in higher buildings. The maximum Mercalli intensity (MMI) was MMI IX in San Nicolás, MMI VIII in Huacho, and MMI VII in Callao. Landslides and huge ground cracks were reported along the Pan-American Highway north of Ancón.

== See also ==
- List of earthquakes in 1966
- List of earthquakes in Peru
