= 1966 Varto earthquake =

Earthquake in eastern Turkey

- Location within Turkey
- UTC time: 1966-08-19 12:22:12
- ISC event: 844692
- USGS-ANSS: ComCat
- Local date: 19 August 1966
- Local time: 14:22:12
- Magnitude: 6.8 M_{w}
- Depth: 24.7 km (15 mi)
- Epicenter: 39.24°N 41.57°E
- Areas affected: Turkey
- Max. intensity: MMI IX (Violent)
- Casualties: 2,394–3,000 dead 1,420–1,500 injured

The 1966 Varto earthquake occurred on 19 August with a moment magnitude of 6.8 a maximum Mercalli intensity of IX (Violent). At least 2,394 were killed and up to 1,500 people were injured in the town of Varto and Hınıs in the Muş Province of eastern Turkey.

The earthquake devastated all the structures in Varto. This disaster was preceded by an earthquake of magnitude 5.6 that hit Varto on 7 March 1966 killing 14 and wounding 75 people.

== See also ==
- List of earthquakes in 1966
- List of earthquakes in Turkey
- North Anatolian Fault
