= Vans challenge =

Internet challenge

The Vans challenge is a viral internet challenge that began in March 2019 where people show their Vans shoes landing right-side up after tossing them in the air. The viral sensation reportedly started after a Twitter user shared a video of the occurrence, which was captioned: “Did you know it doesn’t matter how you throw your Vans they will land facing up.” Since then, multiple people on social media posted similar videos of them throwing their Vans in the air and landing right-side up, along with Crocs, UGG boots, and other popular shoes. This theory proved false, as these shoes have not always landed facing up after tossing them.
