= 1966 Xingtai earthquakes =

Series of earthquakes affecting Hebei, China

Xingtai earthquake
- UTC time: 1966-03-22 08:19:36
- ISC event: 849480
- USGS-ANSS: ComCat
- Local date: March 22, 1966
- Local time: 16:19:36
- Magnitude: 6.8 M_{w} (strongest quake)
- Depth: 20 km (12 mi)
- Epicenter: 37°04′N 114°29′E
- Areas affected: People's Republic of China
- Max. intensity: MMI X (Extreme)
- Casualties: 8,064 dead, 38,000 injured

The Xingtai earthquake (Chinese: 邢台大地震; pinyin: Xíngtái Dà Dìzhèn) was a sequence of major earthquakes that took place between March 8 and March 29, 1966, in the area administered by the prefecture-level city of Xingtai in southern Hebei province, People's Republic of China.

The first earthquake with magnitude 6.0 on the moment magnitude scale and epicenter in Longyao County occurred in the early morning of March 8, 1966. It was followed by a sequence of five earthquakes above magnitude 6 that lasted until March 29, 1966. The strongest of these quakes had a magnitude of 6.8 and took place in the southeastern part of Ningjin County on March 22. The earthquake damage included 8,064 dead, 38,000 injured and more than 5 million destroyed houses.

== Earthquakes ==
Date (YYYY-MM-DD)	Time (UTC)	Latitude	Longitude	Depth	Magnitude	Source
1966-03-07	21:29:19	37.156° N	114.875° E	20 km (12 mi)	6.5 (M_{w})	
1966-03-22	08:11:37	37.535° N	115.039° E	20 km (12 mi)	6.2 (M_{w})	
1966-03-22	08:19:36	37.545° N	115.061° E	20 km (12 mi)	6.8 (M_{w})	
1966-03-26	15:19:04	37.714° N	115.275° E	20 km (12 mi)	6.0 (M_{w})	
1966-03-29	12:00:00	37.464° N	115.127° E	20 km (12 mi)	6.0 (M_{w})	

== See also ==
- List of earthquakes in 1966
- List of earthquakes in China
