= 1966 Tashkent earthquake =

Very strong earthquake in Uzbek SSR

- Location within the Soviet Union
- UTC time: 1966-04-25 23:22:49
- ISC event: 848721
- USGS-ANSS: ComCat
- Local date: 26 April 1966
- Local time: 05:22:49
- Magnitude: 5.1-5.3 M_{w}
- Depth: 3–8 km (1.9–5.0 mi)
- Epicenter: 41°10′N 69°08′E
- Areas affected: Soviet Union (Uzbek SSR)
- Max. intensity: MSK-64 VIII–IX
- Peak acceleration: 0.8 g
- Casualties: 15–200 killed

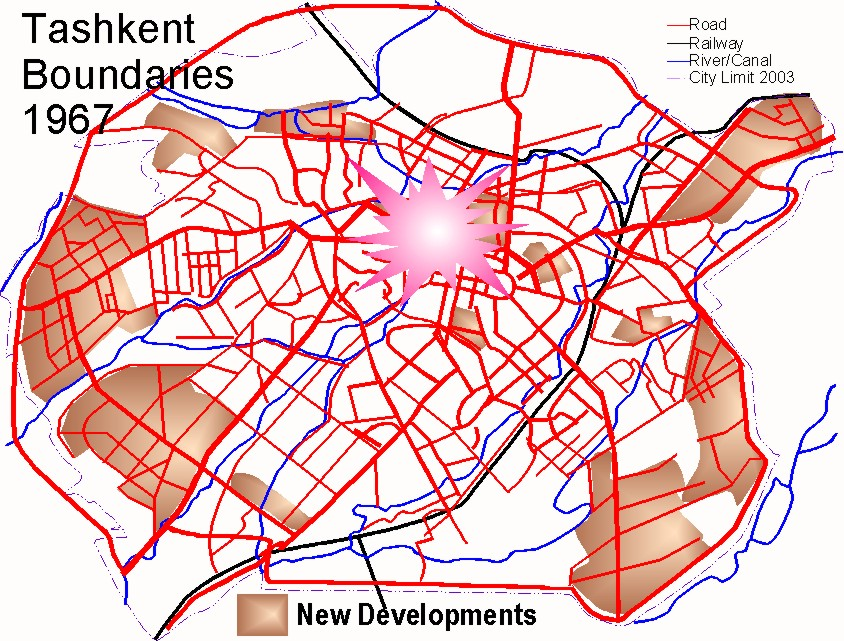
Map Of Tashkent in 1967 and following years showing the earthquake area

The 1966 Tashkent earthquake occurred on 26 April in the Uzbek SSR. It had a moment magnitude of 5.2 with an epicenter in central Tashkent at a depth of 3–8 kilometers (1.9–5.0 mi). The earthquake caused massive destruction to Tashkent, destroying most of the buildings in the city, killing between 15 and 200 people and leaving between 200,000 and 300,000 homeless. Following the disaster, most of the historic parts of Tashkent had been destroyed and the city was rebuilt, based on Soviet architectural styles. Soviet authorities created an institute of seismology in order to forecast future earthquakes.

== Background ==
Tashkent and its immediate vicinity are in a seismically active zone, and 74 earthquakes of a magnitude between 3 and 6 had been recorded from 1914 to 1966. The city had been damaged by earthquakes in 1866 and 1886.

Concerns about possible earthquake damage to the city were raised in the 1940s and 1950s, especially after Ashgabat was devastated in an earthquake in 1948. Before the Tashkent earthquake, an increase in radon levels had been noticed.

== Earthquake ==
The earthquake occurred at 05:23 at the very shallow (and therefore more destructive) depth of 3–8 kilometers (1.9–5.0 mi) with its epicentre in the centre of the city.

The quake caused massive destruction to property. In total, over 80% of the city was destroyed, including over half of the old city.

In total, between 78,000 and 95,000 homes were destroyed. Most of these were traditional adobe housing in more densely populated central areas. The majority of the most significant buildings in Tashkent were destroyed; this included 600-year-old mosques. Most of these buildings predated the Russian Revolution of 1917. However, only Navoi Theater, which was built by Japanese prisoners of war was unharmed.

Estimates of those made homeless by the disaster ranged from 200,000 to 300,000.

While the official death toll was 15 people this figure may be an underestimate due to Soviet secrecy and other sources estimated death tolls ranging from 200 people to 0.5% of the city's population of 1,100,000. Over 20% more women than men were killed.

== Aftermath ==
In the immediate aftermath of the disaster, senior Soviet figures, including CPSU Chairman Leonid Brezhnev, flew to Tashkent to supervise the recovery efforts. A massive rebuilding project was started, with other Soviet republics sending large numbers of workers to assist in the rebuilding process. This changed the ethnic make up of the city, as many of them remained in Tashkent after the work had been completed. The new Tashkent contained architectural styles found in other Soviet cities such as wide boulevards and large apartment block complexes. By 1970, 100,000 new homes had been constructed.

The earthquake also resulted in increased religiosity, with increased interest in many Islamic ritual practices.

To prevent further such disasters from having such a serious impact on the city, in 1966 Soviet authorities created an Institute of seismology, tasked with monitoring seismic changes, such as changes in radon levels and predicting earthquakes.

A memorial stone to victims of the earthquake located above the epicentre was unveiled in 1976.

== See also ==
- List of earthquakes in 1966
