= 1966 Hualien earthquake =

- Location within China
- UTC time: 1966-03-12 16:31:20
- ISC event: 849160
- USGS-ANSS: ComCat
- Local date: March 13, 1966
- Local time: 00:31
- Magnitude: 8.0 M_{s}
- Depth: 22 km (14 mi)
- Epicenter: 24.24°N 122.67°E
- Type: Strike-slip
- Areas affected: Taiwan and Japan
- Max. intensity: MMI VII (Very strong)
- Tsunami: Yes
- Casualties: 6 dead

The 1966 Hualien earthquake occurred on March 13 at 00:31 local time of Taiwan. The epicenter was located in the offshore area between Yonaguni Island, Japan and Hualien, Taiwan.

The intensity in Yonaguni reached shindo 5. Two people were reported dead in Yonaguni, Japan, and four in Taiwan. Building damage was reported. A tsunami with a run-up height of 50 cm (20 in) was observed.

This earthquake released a seismic moment of 4.86×10^{20} Nm. The magnitude of this earthquake was put at M_{s} 8.0, M_{w} 7.79, M_{JMA} 7.8, or M_{L} 7.8. This earthquake had a strike-slip faulting focal mechanism.

The fault plane solutions of this earthquake suggested that there is a sliver of crust off the east coast of Taiwan other than the Philippine Sea plate. The map of shallow earthquakes shows that the Philippines are encircled by a zone of seismicity. There is a difference between the slip direction on the east coast of the Philippines and the relative motion between the Philippine Sea plate and the Eurasian plate. Together with other evidences, it has been suggested that most of the Philippines might belong to a minor plate other than the Eurasian plate.

== See also ==
- List of earthquakes in 1966
- List of earthquakes in Taiwan
