= 1966 Toro earthquake =

Earthquake in Uganda in 1966

- Location within Uganda
- UTC time: 1966-03-20 01:42:53
- ISC event: 849400
- USGS-ANSS: ComCat
- Local date: 20 March 1966
- Local time: 04:42:53
- Magnitude: 6.8 M_{w}
- Depth: 36 km (22 mi)
- Epicenter: 0.85°N 29.87°E
- Type: Dip-slip
- Areas affected: Uganda, Democratic Republic of the Congo, and Tanzania
- Max. intensity: MMI VIII (Severe)
- Casualties: 157 killed (+90 in the May 18 aftershock)

The 1966 Toro earthquake, or the 1966 Ruwenzori earthquake, occurred on 20 March at 01:42 UTC (04:42 Uganda local time). The earthquake was located near the border between Uganda and the Democratic Republic of the Congo (DRC), to the south of Lake Albert. Some sources put the epicenter in Uganda while some put it in the Democratic Republic of the Congo. The earthquake had a magnitude of M_{w} 6.8 and a maximum perceived intensity of VIII (Severe) on the Mercalli intensity scale.

== Tectonic setting ==
The earthquake occurred in the Mt Rwenzori region, which lies within the Western Rift Valley of the East Africa Rift System, between Lake Edward and Lake Albert. The Mt. Ruwenzori region is the most seismically active region in Uganda and also one of the most seismically active zones in the East Africa Rift System and is bounded by steep active normal faults. The calculated focal mechanism for the earthquake was normal faulting in type, although the focal mechanisms of three of the aftershocks were dominantly strike-slip in type.

== Damage ==
Extensive damage was reported in both Uganda and the DRC. The earthquake caused 157 deaths: 104 in Uganda, one in Tanzania and 52 in the DRC. Buildings collapsed in both Uganda and the DRC. In Bundibugyo, the Court Hall was damaged. Cracks and fissures were observed on the ground. This earthquake could be felt in Uganda, the Democratic Republic of the Congo, Rwanda, Burundi, Tanzania, and Kenya. Landslides triggered by the earthquake blocked roads, impeding relief efforts.

According to press reports, a strong aftershock on 18 May 1966, caused 90 deaths in the DRC. This aftershock caused damage to buildings in both Uganda and the DRC.

== Earthquake ==
The earthquake was associated with 20 km (12 mi) of surface faulting showing a downthrow of about 1.8 m (5 ft 11 in) to the southeast, consistent with one of the two possible fault planes from the focal mechanism.

The earthquake was preceded by numerous foreshocks on 18 and 19 March 1966, and was followed by many aftershocks during the next two months, nine of them with a magnitude of 5.0 or greater.

The energy release of the main shock was about 2×10^{17} Nm. The energy release associated with aftershocks after 18 April was also significant. The sum of energy release of the aftershocks up to 45 days after the main shock was also about 2×10^{17} Nm, i.e. roughly equal to that of the main shock.

== See also ==
- List of earthquakes in 1966
- List of earthquakes in DR. Congo
- Tooro Kingdom
- Toro sub-region
