= Paul Van Doren =

American businessman (1930–2021)

Paul Doren
- Born: June 12, 1930; Boston, Massachusetts, US
- Died: May 6, 2021 (aged 90); Fullerton, California, US

Paul Van Doren (June 12, 1930 – May 6, 2021) was an American businessman and one of the founders, along with his brother James Van Doren, of Vans, a shoe company in the United States.

== Early life ==
Van Doren was one of the two children of Johnson and Rena Van Doren. His father was an inventor while his mother was a seamstress.

Van Doren dropped out of school at the age of 14, when he was in the eighth grade. Interested in horses, he went to the race tracks every day; there, he became known as 'Dutch the Clutch.' His mother then insisted that he get a job in a shoe factory.

== Van Doren Rubber Company ==
In 1966, Van Doren, his brother James Van Doren, and their friends Gordon C. Lee, Ryan Emmert and Serge D’Elia opened their first store, under the name Van Doren Rubber Company. It took a year to build and set up the factory at 704 East Broadway in Anaheim. They offered only 3 different styles of shoes when they first opened, priced from $2.49 to $4.99. The Van Dorens would sometimes even go to local swap meets to sell their shoes. When half of their initial 10 stores did not turn a profit, they were advised by their accountants to shut them down. Yet Van Doren did the opposite and opened more stores, hoping that selling more shoes would decrease the cost needed to produce each pair. This plan was a success, and Vans had about 70 stores in California by the end of the 1970s. Van Doren ran the company until 1976, when his brother James took over.

== Personal life ==
Van Doren had five children: Paul Jr., Steve, Cheryl, Taffy, and Janie. Steve became the vice president of events and promotions of Vans, while Cheryl served as its vice president of human resources.

Van Doren died in Fullerton, California, on May 6, 2021, at the age of 90. His memoir, Authentic, was published nine days before his death.
