= Vans =

American manufacturer of shoes

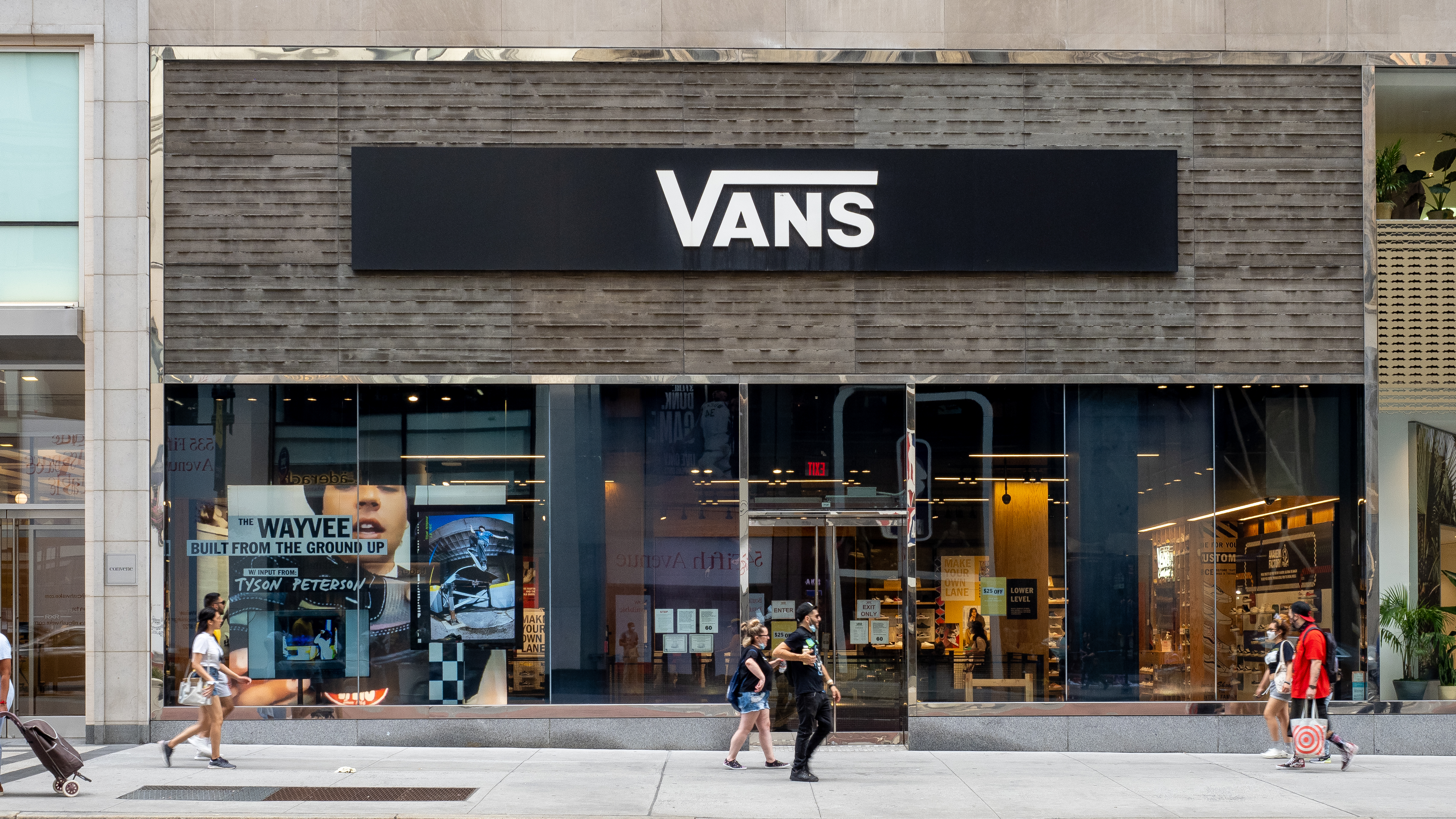
- Vans store in Midtown Manhattan
- Formerly: The Van Doren Rubber Company
- Type: Subsidiary
- Industry: Fashion
- Founded: March 16, 1966; 60 years ago in Anaheim, California, U.S.
- Founders: Paul Van Doren; James Van Doren; Gordon Lee
- Headquarters: Costa Mesa, California, U.S.
- Area served: Worldwide
- Key people: Solána Rowe (artistic director)
- Products: Footwear; clothing; accessories
- Parent: VF Outdoor
- Website: vans.com

Vans (originally called the Van Doren Rubber Company) is an American apparel, accessories, and skateboarding shoes brand, established in Anaheim, California, and owned by VF Corporation. The company also sponsors surf, snowboarding, BMX, and motocross teams. From 1996 to 2019, and beginning again in 2025, the brand has been a primary sponsor of the annual Warped Tour music festival.

== History ==
=== Founding and early history ===
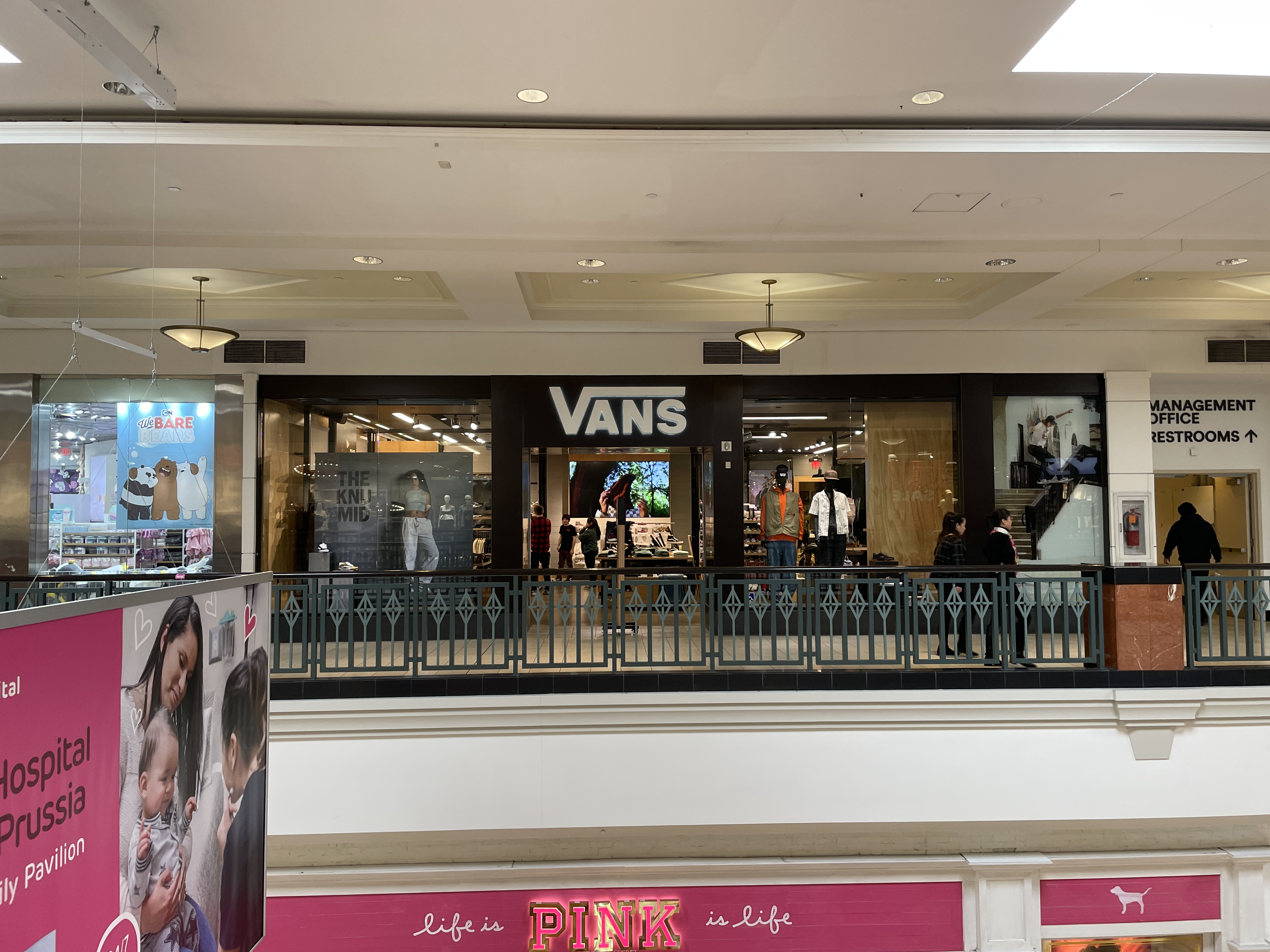
Vans store at the King of Prussia Mall in King of Prussia, Pennsylvania

Paul Van Doren, his brother James, and Gordon C. Lee opened the first Vans store as "The Van Doren Rubber Company" on March 16, 1966, at 704 East Broadway in Anaheim, California. The business manufactured shoes and sold them directly to the public. Upon opening, twelve customers purchased Vans deck shoes (now called "Authentic"), similar to those manufactured by Keds but with a thicker sole. The store had display models of three styles of shoes, priced between US$2.49 and $4.99, but did not have any inventory ready to sell and Paul Van Doren did not have change to give customers; customers took their shoes home and came back the next day to pay.

=== Middle history ===
The original Vans skateboard logo was designed in Costa Mesa, California, in the 1970s by Mark Van Doren, son of then-President and co-owner James Van Doren, at age 13; Mark's design was a stencil, allowing the logo to be spray-painted onto his skateboards. The design was incorporated into the heel tab on Style 95, an early Vans skateboard shoe.

In 1976, Vans began using its "Off The Wall" motto, a slang phrase used by skateboarders while doing tricks in empty pools. Around this time, Vans released its Vans Side-stripe and Vans #36, also known as the "Old Skool" design.

In 1984, facing heavy competition and a market flooded with Vans counterfeits, Vans lowered its prices and eventually filed for bankruptcy protection. In 1988, Van Doren and Lee sold the company to banking firm McCown De Leeuw & Co. for US$74.4 million. In 1989, many Vans counterfeiters were apprehended by the U.S. and Mexican governments and ordered to cease production.

By 1991, the company's shoes were highly desired due to high demand and low supply. The company expanded internationally; released new models, including snowboard shoes; and was renamed Vans, Inc. to reflect its customers calling the shoes "Vans" for short. The same year, Vans went public at US$14 per share on NASDAQ.

=== Recent history ===
In 2004, Vans merged with North Carolina–based VF Corporation. In 2016, in celebration of its 50th anniversary, Vans released a new logo and launched a campaign to target a wider audience. In 2022, Vans launched the new VR3 product line where 30% of the product is renewable, recycled or regenerative. VF Corporation will expand the VR3 product collection to more footwear and apparel categories.

== Partnerships ==
Since 1999, Vans has sponsored and supported Warped Tour, the longest-running touring music festival to date in North America. In 2001, Warped Tour was rebranded as Vans Warped Tour.

Vans became the title sponsor of the US Open of Surfing in Huntington Beach, California, in 2014, and in 2010, the company sponsored the Duct Tape Invitational.

In 2022, to commence the US Open of Surfing period, Vans hosted the BMX Waffle Cup, a freestyle BMX invitational tournament. Their Huntington Beach skate park's course was modified by BMX riders for the tournament, and was themed after the US Open.

“ In 2025 Vans announced a multi-year creative partnership with musician and style artist SZA, naming her the brand’s first Artistic Director. The partnership includes creative campaigns and exclusive product collections that combine SZA’s creative vision with Vans’ brand identity.

== Public skate parks ==
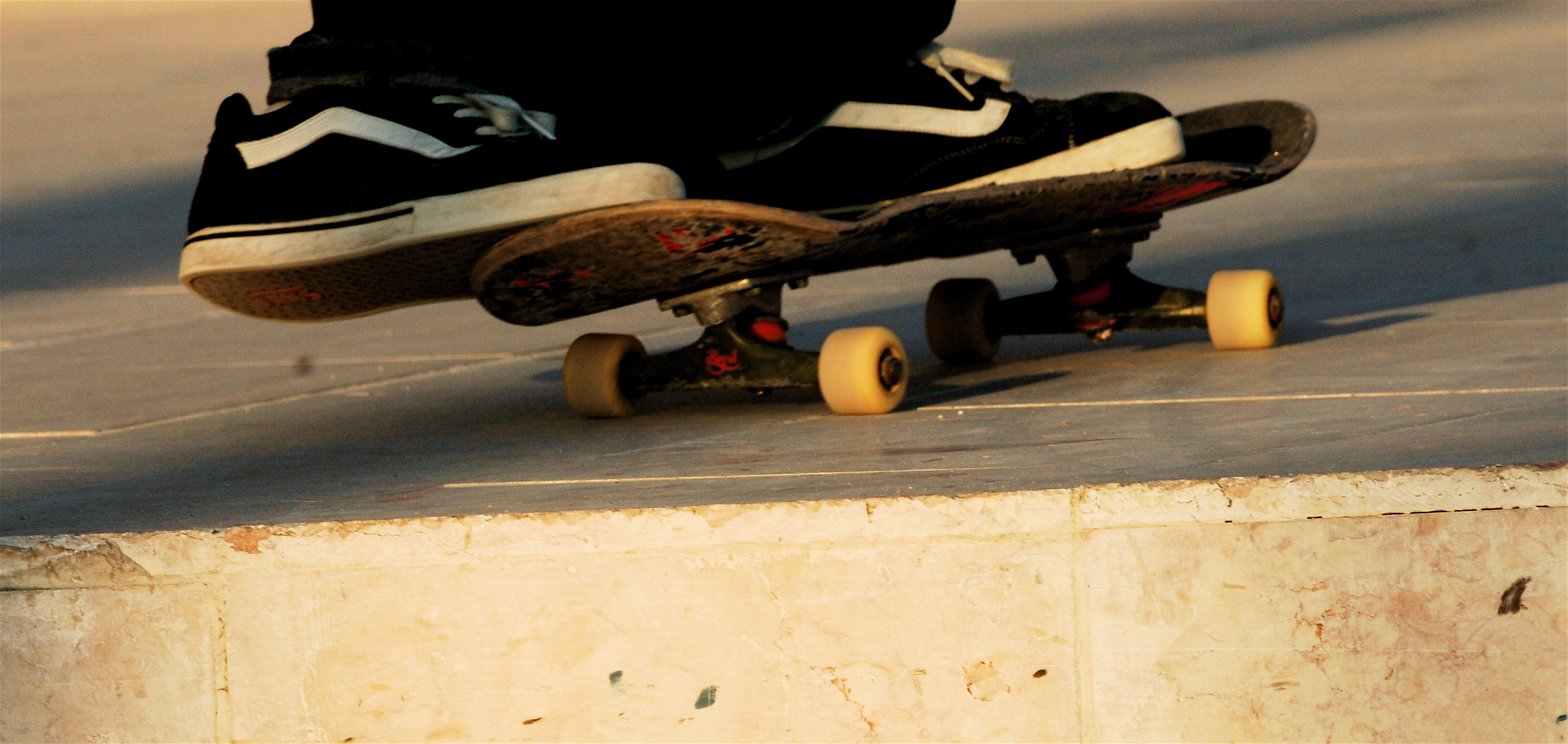
Vans shoes in use on a skateboard

Vans opened its first skatepark in 1998 at The Outlets at Orange, in Orange, California. It features a 20,000-square-foot (1,900 m^{2}) indoor street course, 12 feet (3.7 m) deep combo pool, area for amateurs, mini ramps, outdoor street course, and arcade. The park was updated in 2009. It has remained closed since March 2020, when BMX rider Tyler Kanarr died after sustaining major injuries in the park.

The company built its second skate park in Huntington Beach, California, which opened to the public in 2010. It includes a 17,500-square-foot (1,630 m^{2}) skate bowl and a 25,000-square-foot (2,300 m^{2}) skate plaza. The park is 42,500 square feet (3,950 m^{2}), and Vans pays the city US$1 per year for its 20-year lease.

There was a skate park in Waterloo, London, in The Old Vic Tunnels, called House of Vans. Which closed its doors permanently in 2022

== In popular culture ==
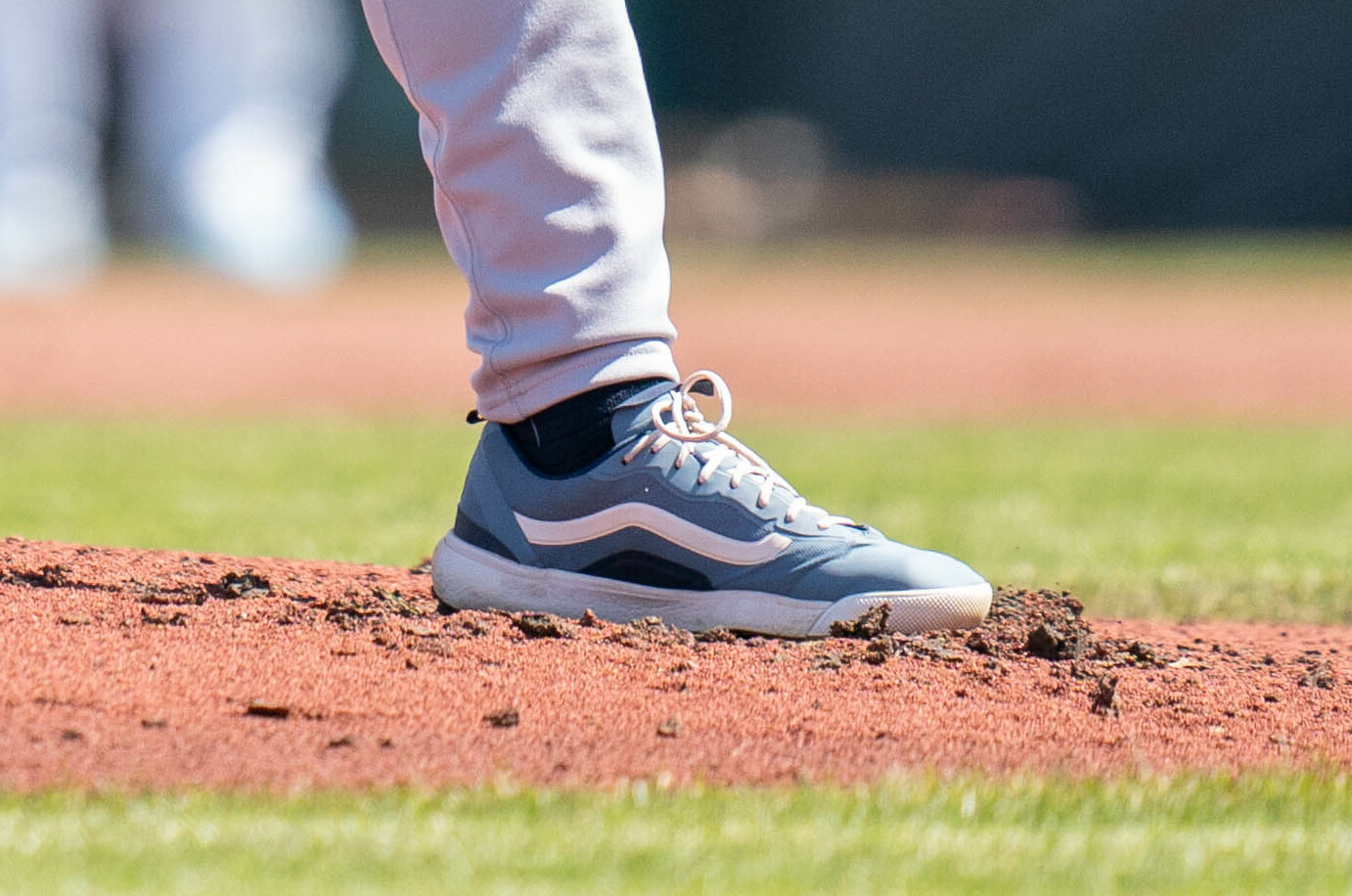
Major League Baseball pitcher Michael Lorenzen plays baseball with customized Vans instead of baseball shoes.

Vans' shoes have often been customized cosmetically by wearers, with many of their painting and drawing patterns being adopted by the company for their official models. Most notably, the checkerboard pattern, popular in ska and punk culture, was adopted after the company noticed skateboarders drawing it on their shoes.

Vans reached nationwide popularity when, in 1982, Sean Penn wore a pair of Vans checkerboard slip-ons as character Jeff Spicoli in Fast Times at Ridgemont High.

In 2016, the internet meme "Damn Daniel", featuring California teen Daniel Lara wearing Vans, went viral. In appreciation, the company gave Lara a lifetime supply of Vans shoes.

In March 2019, a viral internet challenge called the Vans challenge where people tossed their Vans shoes into the air to see if they land upright was started.

The Major League Baseball pitcher Michael Lorenzen grew up skateboarding with Vans. As of 2023, he plays baseball wearing customized Vans UltraRange Exos with cleats, rather than traditional baseball shoes. On August 9, 2023, Lorenzen became the first pitcher to throw a no-hitter in Vans; the Vans will be displayed in the National Baseball Hall of Fame.
