= Auto-asphyxiate =

Auto-asphyxiate could refer to:

- Erotic asphyxiation
- Blackout challenge
- Choking game
- Killing yourself using suffocation; see Suicide methods#Suffocation
