= Blue Whale Challenge =

Social network cyberbullying phenomenon

Blue Whale Challenge (Russian: Си́ний ки́т, romanized: Siniy kit), also known simply as the Blue Whale, is a social network phenomenon that first appeared in Russia in 2013, and is claimed to exist in several countries. It is a "game" reportedly consisting of a series of tasks assigned to players by administrators over a 50-day period, which are initially innocuous and then introduce elements of self-harm, with the final challenge requiring the player to kill themselves.

Blue Whale Challenge first attracted news coverage in May 2016 in an article in the Russian newspaper Novaya Gazeta that linked many unrelated child suicides to membership of group "F57" on the Russian-based VK social network. A wave of moral panic swept Russia. The piece was criticized for attempting to make a causal link where none existed, and none of the suicides were found to be a result of the group's activities. Claims of suicides connected to the game have been reported worldwide, but none have been confirmed.

The game has been banned in some countries, including Egypt, Kenya, and Pakistan. However, experts have said that since the game is not played on any specific website or app, it may be difficult or even impossible to fully ban it.

== Background ==
In November 2015, Renata Kambolina, a Russian teenager, posted a selfie with the caption "nya.bye" before killing herself; her death was then discussed in internet forums and groups, becoming mixed with scare stories and folklore. Further suicides were added to the group stories. Soon after Kambolina's death, Russian journalist Galina Mursaliyeva first wrote about these "death groups" in an article published in the Russian newspaper Novaya Gazeta in April 2016. The article described the "F57" groups on Russian social media site VK, which she claimed had incited 130 teenagers to kill themselves. Mursaliyeva's article was criticized at the time of its release for lacking credible data and balance, with the 130 cases of suicide cited being particularly problematic. The number was originally suggested by the father of one of the teenagers, Sergey Pestov, who came to the figure 130 by using Russian media sources to look for child suicides he believed were linked to online groups; he then produced a brochure which implied that foreign intelligence operatives were responsible for encouraging Russian children to commit suicide. After an investigation by Evgeny Berg for Meduza, Mursaliyeva responded by saying in fact there had been at least 200 suicides.

The origin of the name "Blue Whale" is uncertain. Some reports say that it comes from a song by the Russian rock band Lumen, which opens with the lines "Why scream / When no one hears / What we're talking about?", and it features a "huge blue whale" that "can't break through the net". Others believe it to be a reference to beaching, where whales become stranded on beaches and die.

The game is said to run on different social media platforms and is described as a relationship between an administrator and participant. Over a period of fifty days the administrator sets one task per day; the tasks seem innocent to begin with ("get up at 4:30 a.m.", "watch a horror movie"), and move on to self-harm, leading to the participant killing themselves on the final day. As a professor at Russian State University for the Humanities (RSUH), Alexandra Arkhipova found that the administrators were children aged between 12 and 14, drawn to the story as it became widely reported and not, as the hysteria had intimated, predatory adults.

== Social concerns ==
While many experts suggest Blue Whale was originally a sensationalized hoax, they believe that it is likely that the phenomenon has led to instances of imitative self-harming or suicide contagion effects. And studies have found that those effects can spread through discussion in the media, even discussions about the dangers, as the trend became circulated online and trigger words became more normalized. It also is believed to have led to copycat groups, leaving vulnerable children at risk of cyberbullying and online shaming.

By late 2017, reported participation in Blue Whale was receding. Internet safety organizations across the world have reacted by giving general advice to parents and educators on suicide prevention, mental health awareness, and online safety in advance of the next incarnation of cyberbullying.

"People join narratives to explain their experiences ... that is possibly why some children have said they participated in the rumoured challenge despite there being no proof of its existence."

— Dr. Achal Bhagat, Delhi psychiatrist, BBC News India, September 19, 2017

American skeptic Ben Radford researched the phenomenon, calling it the "moral panic du jour" and equating it to the Dungeons & Dragons controversies of the 1980s. Radford also states "this is only the latest in a long series of similar moral panics and outrages shared on social media ... the best antidote ... is a healthy dose of skepticism". The podcast Squaring the Strange included his analysis of the dangers for parents when these stories are spread.

Case studies have also been done to reframe online suicide games as a type of cyberbullying. Although the victim does voluntarily start playing the game, it includes the key elements of cyberbullying: manipulation, coercion, and psychological pressure. And it was also found that while the victims did initiate their participation in the game, many of the kids who played were struggling in school with poor grades or absenteeism, suggesting a need for intervention by the schools to prevent the decline in mental health that lead students to seek out the Blue Whale.

=== Police warnings ===
Police in Russia have issued extensive warnings about the game.

Police in numerous other countries have issued warnings, including in Armenia, Brazil, France, India, New Zealand and the United Kingdom.

== Arrests ==
In 2016, Philipp Budeikin, a 21-year-old former psychology student who was expelled from his university, claimed that he invented the game in 2013. According to Budeikin, its purpose is to "clean society of biological wastes", as he intended to "clean" society from individuals who were deemed as having no value and considered as burdens. Although originally claiming innocence and stating he was "just having fun", Budeikin was arrested and held in Kresty Prison, Saint Petersburg, and in May 2016 pled guilty to "inciting at least 16 teenage girls to commit suicide". He was later convicted on two counts of inciting suicide of a minor. Commentators such as Benjamin Radford have pointed out that sensationalized stories in world news regarding the involvement of Budeikin have all linked back to just two Russian sources, with tabloid news outlets replicating the same information without elaboration.

In June 2017, postman Ilya Sidorov was arrested in Moscow, also accused of setting up a Blue Whale group to encourage children to self-harm and ultimately kill themselves. He claimed to have persuaded 32 children to join his group and follow his commands.

In June 2018, Russian financial analyst Nikita Nearonov was arrested for allegedly masterminding the Blue Whale game. Nearonov is suspected of grooming 10 underage girls in order to bring them to suicide, two of whom, aged 14 and 17, are known to have survived. As a financial analyst, Nearonov has been described as a computer expert who held a large amount of contempt for teenagers, believing that they were "wicked" and "deserved to die". Police reports claim that Nearonov's involvement in the Blue Whale game was his "hobby".

== Alleged incidents ==
=== Armenia ===
According to news reports, the cause of death of 15-year-old Hrachya Nersisyan, who died by suicide, was the game "Blue Whale". According to the head of the department for the Protection of Minors' Rights and Combating Domestic Violence of the Main Criminal Investigation Department of the Armenian Police, Nelly Duryan, the Armenian segment of the Internet is flooded with messages about this "game", but there are no final conclusions on this issue yet.

=== Australia ===
Although no reports of suicides in Australia have been linked to the game, an investigation by an Australian journalist on Kidspot reportedly confirmed the existence of the game.

=== Bangladesh ===
Despite many news reports published in Bangladeshi media attempting to link suicides with the game, no case has been officially confirmed.

In October 2017, Bangladesh Home Minister Asaduzzaman Khan stated that the Bangladesh Telecommunication Regulatory Commission (BTRC) has been directed to investigate the Blue Whale game after reports of suicide around the country. BTRC released a notice urging people to call a specific number if any web link or any information related to the Blue Whale game were to be found. Later that month, the Bangladeshi High Court ordered a six-month ban on special night-time internet packages provided by various mobile operators across the country.

=== Brazil ===
Despite several news reports in Brazilian media linking cases of child self-harm and suicide with Blue Whale and several ongoing investigations, none have been officially confirmed.

In response to the game, a designer and a publicity agent from São Paulo created a movement called Baleia Rosa (Pink Whale), which became popular. It relied on the collaboration of hundreds of volunteers. The movement was based on positive tasks that value life and combat depression. Another movement, the Capivara Amarela (Yellow Capybara), was created by Sandro Sanfelice, and proposed to "combat the Blue Whale game" and guide people seeking some kind of help. Participants were separated into either challengers, who are the people who need guidance, or healers, who are a kind of sponsor to the challengers. An Adventist school in southern Paraná, in partnership with other education networks, also sought to reverse the situation by proposing another charity game, the "Jonas Challenge" (referring to the biblical character Jonah, who was swallowed by a whale and vomited up three days later). Other games created in Brazil in response to the Blue Whale were the Baleia Verde (Green Whale) and the Preguiça Azul (Blue Sloth).

In Belo Horizonte and Recife metropolitan area in Brazil, many schools promoted lectures to talk about the Blue Whale game. On May 21, 2017, it was announced that the Brazilian police Specialized in High Technology Crime Repression in Piauí were preparing a digital primer to warn young people about the dangers of the game.

=== Bulgaria ===
The first media reports of the game in Bulgaria appeared in mid-February 2017. However, the game was dismissed as a hoax by the Georgi Apostolov Centre.

=== Chile ===
The first alleged case of the game in Chile was reported in April 2017 in Antofagasta, after a 12-year-old girl was seen with 15 cuts on her arm, which formed a "whale".

=== China ===
In May 2017, Tencent, China's largest Internet service portal, closed 12 suspicious Blue Whale-related network groups on its social networking platform QQ. It said that the number of this kind of groups is on the rise. The search results of related keywords were also blocked.

=== Egypt ===
In April 2018, Egyptian news sources claimed a 12-year-old schoolboy had killed himself by taking poisonous tablets to fulfill one of the challenges of the game. According to the media, the schoolboy was found with a scar in the shape of a blue whale on his right arm. In reaction to the growing media awareness of the game, Egypt's Dar al-Ifta al-Misriyyah uploaded a video on their YouTube channel claiming that the game is forbidden in Islam, and warning against it. As of 2025, about 26 suicides in Egypt have been associated with Blue Whale challenge, though the actual number is said to be higher.

=== Germany ===
In 2017, a 13-year-old girl from Radevormwald, North Rhine-Westphalia, was reported to have scratched a blue whale on her arm as part of the game. The game was allegedly found on her phone.

=== India ===
Throughout 2017, media in India reported several cases of child suicide, self-harm and attempted suicide alleged to be a result of Blue Whale, and in response, the Indian government's Ministry of Electronics and Information Technology, requested that several internet companies (including Google, Facebook, and Yahoo!) remove all links which direct users to the game. Some commentators accused the government of creating a moral panic. The Indian internet watchdog Centre for Internet and Society accused the coverage of effectively spreading and advertising a "game" for which there is little evidence. The Supreme Court asked the Indian Central government to ban the game, following which the government responded that since Blue Whale wasn't an application, it couldn't be banned. For a period of time several internet providers blocked Russian social network VKontakte over concerns about the "game" believed to originate on this Russian social network.

In January 2018, the government reported there was no evidence that any death was a result of the challenge, stating, "The committee analysed the internet activities, device activities, call records and other social media activity, other forensic evidences and also interacted with rescued victims associated with these incidents. Involvement of Blue Whale challenge game in any of these incidents could not be established." In June 2023, the government informed the Supreme Court that it is not possible to block the Blue Whale challenge.

=== Iran ===
In September 2017, the Iranian Minister of Information and Communications Technology posted a message in his official Instagram account to warn parents and teachers about the spread of the Blue Whale challenge among Iranian teens.

=== Italy ===
In Italy, press coverage of Blue Whale first appeared on 3 June 2016, in the newspaper La Stampa, which described the challenge as "a bad joke". The debunking site BUTAC reported the total lack of evidence to affirm the game's existence. On 14 May 2017, a TV report by Le Iene about 'Blue Whale' on the national channel Italia 1 linked the challenge to an unconnected suicide in Livorno. The report showed several suicide scenes, mostly from videos on LiveLeak depicting adults unrelated to the challenge. It incorrectly described the footage as evidence of teenagers playing the game. The report interviewed a schoolmate of the Livorno teenager, two mothers of Russian girls who supposedly took part in the game, and the founder of the Russian Center for the safety of children from internet crimes. Following the report, coverage of the challenge in the Italian media increased, with many outlets describing it as real. There was a sharp rise in Google searches for the challenge, and some panic.

On May 15 and 16, newspapers announced the arrest of Budeikin, without saying that it happened months before. His unconfirmed statements about his supposed victims being "genetical rubbish" were reported as real. Paolo Attivissimo, a journalist and debunker of hoaxes, described the game as "a death myth dangerously exaggerated by sensationalist journalism". Police received calls from terrified parents and teachers, and there were reports of teenagers taking part in the challenge. These included several cases of self-mutilation and attempted suicide. Most reports were considered to be false or exaggerated. Alleged participants were reported from all over Italy: Ravenna, Brescia and Siracusa.

On 22 May 2017, the Polizia Postale stated they had received 40 reports. On 24 May they raised the number to 70. On its website the Polizia Postale defines Blue Whale as "a practice that seems to possibly come from Russia" and offers advice to parents and teenagers. Several alleged cases have since been described by newspapers.

=== Israel ===
In July 2020, the Israeli Child Online Protection Bureau had announced they are collaborating with TikTok to "eradicate the Blue Whale phenomenon".

=== Kenya ===
Jamie Njenga, a 16-year-old boy who attended JG Kiereini Secondary School in Kiambu County, Kenya, hanged himself with a rope from the balcony of his home, according to his grandfather John Njenga. He was reported to have played the game on his phone, which was seized by police following his suicide. This was the first suicide in Kenya to be linked to the game. Because of this, the Kenya Film Classification Board (KFCB) banned the game in Kenya, and wrote to all internet service providers (ISP) in Kenya and to numerous other major social media platforms and tech companies (including Facebook, Google, Instagram, Twitter and YouTube) to ensure that all links to the game are blocked in Kenya.

=== New Zealand ===
Although no suicides in New Zealand have been linked to the game, New Zealand Police have issued warnings about the game.

=== Paraguay ===
A 22-year-old student, Federico Pedro Aguilera, was found dead with a stab wound to his chest in Coronel Bogado, Paraguay, with his death linked to the Blue Whale. This was the first suicide in Paraguay to be linked to the game.

=== Portugal ===
At least eight suicides in Portugal have been linked to the game, though many of the reports involved foreign individuals as opposed to Portuguese residents.

=== Russia ===
In March 2017, authorities in Russia were investigating approximately 130 separate cases of suicide related to the phenomenon. In February a 15-year-old and 16-year-old killed themselves by jumping off of a 14-story building in Irkutsk, Siberia after completing 50 tasks sent to them. Before they killed themselves together, they left messages on their pages on social networks. Also in February, a 15-year-old was in critical condition after jumping out of an apartment and falling on snow-covered ground in the town of Krasnoyarsk, Siberia.

On 26 May 2017, the Russian Duma passed a bill introducing criminal responsibility for creating pro-suicide groups on social media and in June 2017, President Putin signed a law imposing criminal penalties for inducing minors to suicide. The law imposes a maximum punishment of six years in prison.

=== Saudi Arabia ===
On 15 July 2018, the Saudi General Commission for Audio-Visual Media banned 47 video games, including Grand Theft Auto V, Assassin's Creed II and The Witcher 3: Wild Hunt, that had online components that were alleged to be part of the Blue Whale game following the suicides of two teenagers that had been involved in it.

=== Spain ===
In 2018, the first suicide in Spain allegedly linked to the game was reported, after a 14-year-old girl from Gipuzkoa, Basque Country killed herself and acknowledged that she played the game. Although she initially did not intend to complete all 50 challenges (suicide being the last), she ended up doing so, stating that the perpetrators could be found "in Barcelona and in Argentina".

=== Tunisia ===
On 12 March 2018, the parents of seven Tunisian children who claimed their children had killed themselves due to the game requested a ban on Blue Whale from the Tunisian courts. A trial court in Sousse issued an interim judgment prohibiting Blue Whale and another supposed similar game named "Miriam".

=== United States ===
Many schools in the United States have warned parents about the game, though the number of Americans reported to have killed themselves because of the game has been low.

=== Uruguay ===
In Uruguay, the game has been linked to suicides in at least six departments: Canelones, Colonia, Montevideo, Rio Negro, Rivera and Salto.

=== Venezuela ===
In January 2019, a 15-year-old boy killed himself at his home in Vargas, Venezuela, after allegedly playing the game.

== In popular culture ==
Several movies and TV series have adopted Blue Whale Challenge as a part of their storyline, including:

- In the episode of the Netflix series Black Mirror titled "Shut Up and Dance" (2016), parallels were drawn to the Blue Whale Challenge.
- Blue Whale Challenge was shown in the Brazilian telenovela Edge of Desire (2017).
- Manasinata (2019), an Indian Kannada-language drama film by R. Ravindra, is based on the Blue Whale Challenge and explores issues which may lead children into suicidal internet games and challenges.
- Early Swallows is a 2019 Ukrainian teen drama television show which focuses on teenage issues such as drugs, bullying and the Blue Whale Challenge.
- 50 or Two Whales Meet on the Beach (2020), a Mexican drama film follows two teens who meet and fall in love while playing the Blue Whale Challenge and decide to follow through on the last task, suicide.
- The Blue Whale (El Hoot El Azraq) is a 2020 Egyptian film that focuses on the game and the police investigation surrounding the deaths of teens.
- Martyisdead is a 2019 Czech thriller web series that was inspired by the Blue Whale Challenge.
- Search Out is a 2020 South Korean thriller film written and directed by Kwak Jeong that was inspired by the Blue Whale Challenge.
- The White List (Белый список) is a 2023 Russian police procedural drama directed by Alisa Khazanova from the script by Roman Volobuev and starring Aleksei Serebryakov.

== See also ==
- Choking game – Dangerous game of trying to faint
  - Blackout challenge – Internet challenge revolving around the choking game
- Cyberbullying – Bullying in electronic communications
- Momo Challenge hoax – Internet hoax
- 764 (organization)
- Peer pressure – Influencing peers to conform
- Suicide contagion
