= Freya Tingley =

Australian actress (born 1994)

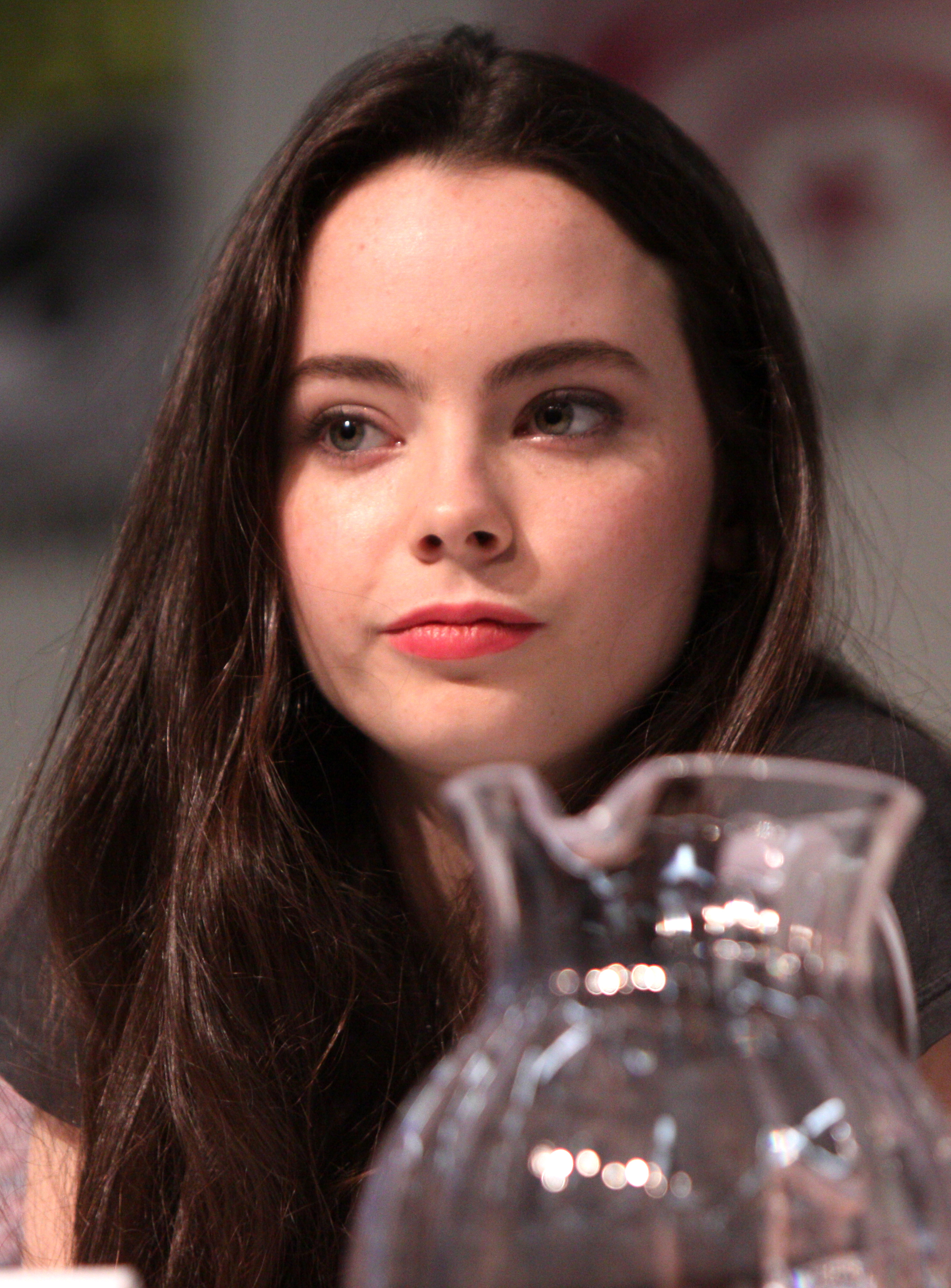
- At the 2013 WonderCon
- Born: 26 March 1994 (age 32); Perth, Western Australia, Australia
- Occupation: Actress
- Years active: 2008–present

Freya Tingley (born 26 March 1994) is an Australian actress. She is best known for her roles as Wendy Darling in the series Once Upon A Time, Christina Wendall in the Netflix series Hemlock Grove, and Francine Valli in Clint Eastwood's Jersey Boys.

== Career ==
Tingley's first role was Young Joan in Caryl Churchill's play Far Away for The Black Swan Theatre Company in 2008. Since then she has appeared in a number of films including the short Bootleg, a singing role in the short Light as a Feather, directed by Damien Spiccia, X, directed by Jon Hewitt, and 3 voice-overs for the production Bully for You. She appeared in the television miniseries Cloudstreet based on Tim Winton's novel in a support role as Young Hat Lamb.

In 2011, she played the lead as a deaf girl communicating in Auslan in the short film Beneath the Waves by director Renee Marie.. In the same year, she was also shortlisted for the lead role as ‘’Katniss Everdeen’’ in Lionsgate’s ‘’The Hunger Games’’.

In 2012, Tingley was cast in Hemlock Grove, the Netflix series produced by Eli Roth in which she plays Christina Wendall.

In 2013, Tingley was cast in Once Upon a Time as Wendy, a 13-year-old girl based on the heroine Wendy Darling from the novel Peter Pan. Tingley won the part of Wendy after one audition upon impressing producers with her ability to project a British accent. Wendy was only seen in a number of episodes and helped Peter Pan (Robbie Kay) gain Henry's heart. However, she is then reunited with her family. In 2014, Tingley had the lead role in The Choking Game, a movie made for Lifetime.

Tingley also played Francine Valli in Jersey Boys, directed by Clint Eastwood.

Tingley then starred in the 2016 TV series The Wilding and the film No Way to Live, which centers on an interracial teenage couple in the 1950s robbing and stealing to escape their oppressive town.

== Filmography ==
Film
Year	Title	Role	Notes
2009	Bootleg	Sarah	Short
2010	Light as a Feather	Sophie	Short
2011	X: Night of Vengeance	Cindy	
2011	Beneath the Waves the wrong nanny	Eleanor	Short
2012	Sticks and Stones	Zoe	Short
2014	Swelter	London	
2014	Jersey Boys	Francine Valli	
2014	The Choking Game	Taryn	
2016	No Way To Live	Nora Thompson	
2016	The Disembodied	Jennifer	Short
2017	The Young	Diana	
2018	Spinning Man	Mary	
2018	The Sonata	Rose	
2021	Bad Detectives	Nic O'Connell	
2023	Time Addicts	Denise	

Television
Year	Title	Role	Notes
2011	Cloudstreet	Hat Lamb	Part 1 and Part 2
2013	Hemlock Grove	Christina Wendall	Season 1 (series regular)
2013	Once Upon a Time	Wendy Darling	Recurring role, 5 episodes: "Second Star to the Right" (season 2: episode 21) "Dark Hollow" (season 3: episode 7) "Think Lovely Thoughts" (season 3: episode 8) "Save Henry" (season 3: episode 9) "The New Neverland" (season 3: episode 10)
2013	Fashion Police	Herself	1 episode
2014	R.L. Stine's The Haunting Hour	Karen	"Return of the Pumpkinheads" (Season 4, Episode 5)
2017	The Wrong Nanny	Blake	TV film
2021	Dota: Dragon's Blood	Fymryn & Light Moon Goddess Mene reborn	Web series; voice
