= Dark Hollow (Once Upon a Time) =

- Once Upon a Time episode
- Episode no.: Season 3 Episode 7
- Directed by: Guy Ferland
- Written by: Kalinda Vazquez & Andrew Chambliss
- Production code: 307
- Original air date: November 10, 2013

Guest appearances
- Joanna García Swisher as Ariel; Lee Arenberg as Leroy/Grumpy; Keegan Connor Tracy as Mother Superior/Blue Fairy; Raphael Sbarge as Dr. Hopper/Jiminy Cricket; Beverley Elliot as Granny; David-Paul Grove as Doc; Gabe Khouth as Sneezy; Faustino Di Bauda as Sleepy; Jeffrey Kaiser as Dopey; Michael Coleman as Happy; Mig Macario as Bashful; Robbie Kay as Peter Pan; Rose McIver as Tinker Bell; Parker Croft as Felix; Freya Tingley as Wendy Darling; James Immekus as Keychain/Michael Darling; Matt Kane as Glasses/John Darling

Episode chronology
← Previous "Ariel"	Next → "Think Lovely Thoughts"
- Once Upon a Time (season 3)

"Dark Hollow" is the seventh episode of the third season of the American fantasy drama series Once Upon a Time, and the show's 51st episode overall.

In this episode, Ariel (Joanna García Swisher) makes her way to Storybrooke after being sent by Mr. Gold (Robert Carlyle) and Regina Mills (Lana Parrilla) to tell Belle (Emilie De Ravin) and the townspeople of the impending danger coming from Peter Pan (Robbie Kay). Meanwhile, Emma Swan (Jennifer Morrison), Captain Hook (Colin O'Donoghue), and Neal Cassidy (Michael Raymond-James) attempt to capture Pan's shadow from a place known as the Dark Hollow. Neal and Hook seemingly fight over a lighter although Hook later reveals that they were fighting over Emma.

The episode — written by Kalinda Vazquez and Andrew Chambliss and directed by Guy Ferland — was received positively by critics, especially with the episode's pace compared to past episodes in the third season; however, despite positive reviews, the episode was watched by 6.71 million viewers, a significant drop from the previous episode.

== Title card ==
The Storybrooke clocktower stands in the Enchanted Forest.

== Plot ==
=== In the Characters' Past ===
Going back five days earlier as Emma Swan, Mary Margaret, David, Regina, Gold, and Hook left for Neverland to search for Henry, Gold tells Belle that the prophecy will be his undoing and he might not be coming back, but Belle believes in her heart that he will return. Gold also gave her instructions to use a cloaking spell because there might be others coming from the outside world to destroy Storybrooke, and after alerting the residents of the threat, she places the spell around the city limits by opening a vein of fairy dust in the mines; however, a pair of brothers arriving from Minnesota in a convertible managed to sneak in just in time, as they are revealed to be the contacts from Peter Pan's Home Office.

=== In Storybrooke ===
Five days later, the seven dwarfs are having lunch by the beach talking about how quiet it has been since Regina, Snow and Charming have left and no killings have occurred, when Leroy witnesses Ariel emerging from the ocean. She tells Leroy that she was sent on a mission from Neverland to contact Belle and retrieve an item that's stored in Gold's pawn shop. Unfortunately, this exchange is being watched from afar as the brothers are given their orders to make sure that Ariel never makes it back to Neverland with the item. After Leroy brings Ariel to Belle at Granny's Diner, the two head back to the pawn shop, where the sand dollar is activated. A projection of Gold tells Belle that their love is the only way they can defeat Peter Pan. Belle believes that can be found in the only item that symbolizes their true love, the chipped tea cup, as magic can be put in its proper spot. Belle discovers that the spot is Pandora's Box, which contains the world's darkest evils and can be used to defeat Pan. But before they can prepare to bring it back to Gold, the brothers succeed in stealing the item. The brothers escape, leaving Belle and Ariel tied up. Belle and Ariel however break free by using Ariel's fins and learn that the only way to destroy the item is by using the pickaxe in the mines, so she and Ariel race to the mines, where just as they are about to destroy the box, Belle uses a cart to knock the brothers out and stops them cold in going through with their plan. The brothers then plead with Belle that they are not interested in destroying magic: they want to use the box so they can rescue their sister, Wendy, who has been a prisoner of Peter Pan for over a century. They then reveal themselves as her brothers, Michael and John Darling. Belle tells the brothers that the box will be the only way to stop Pan and free their sister. Ariel then takes the box back to Neverland and gives it to Gold. Regina then rewards her by giving her the ability to walk on land, allowing her to continue her search for Eric. Ariel also tells Gold that Wendy is also a captive of Pan's and that they should save her too. As Ariel leaves, Gold tells her to send a message to Belle that he will return.

=== In Neverland ===
As the mission begins in Neverland, Gold and Regina give Ariel instructions to contact Belle once she arrives in Storybrooke to retrieve an item that will be useful in their quest to destroy Peter Pan. Regina also gives her a bracelet that she can use for only 24 hours in order to complete her mission and Gold gives her an enchanted sand dollar, instructing her to give it to Belle as she'll know what it means. However, moments after Ariel escapes into the realms, this plan is discovered by Pan, who tells Felix that a pair of minions from the outside world will arrive there immediately to solve the problem.

While one plan to destroy Pan is placed in motion, another is being plotted inside Neverland, as Neal reveals to Emma and Hook that the coconut shell that showcases the stars in the cave he used to live in is also how they can capture Pan's shadow, which was how Neal escaped Neverland in the past. He knows where to find one, which is revealed to be Dark Hollow, the darkest place on the island, where the plan is to capture Pan's shadow by drawing it to the flame inside the shell. Mary Margaret is still mad and upset with David by giving him the cold shoulder because he lied to her about being poisoned by the Dreamshade and will not be able to leave Neverland. Emma noticed this and tried to speak up for her father that he did the right thing by focussing on the mission. However, Mary Margaret does not seem to care as she acknowledges it's because Emma inherited her father's tunnel vision. Mary Margarett then confesses with concern that the reason why Neal and Hook are going along with Emma is both men might have feelings for Emma and forewarns her that she should be more worried about them too. As the trio leaves to the location, Emma is impressed by Hook becoming more of an ally, but he also tells Emma that sooner or later she'll have to choose between him and Neal. They retrieve the coconut shell in Neal's old cave, where Hook reveals to Neal that he and Emma kissed. When they reach the destination, the trio starts to light up the candle inside the shell to attract them, only to have the two men fight each other over who'll light it and as expected, over Emma. However, the plan backfires as two shadows attack Neal and Hook, but Emma eventually springs into action by using magic to light the shell and it attracts Pan's shadow to the trap, prompting Emma to capture it successfully, and allowing Neal and Hook to be free from the shadows. Unfortunately, Emma is not happy with how both Neal and Hook are behaving around her, prompting her to read the riot act to the two men, making it clear to them that the most important male in her life will always be Henry.

Moments later after Emma, Hook, and Neal leave, while en route to Tinker Bell's hideout, Mary Margaret finally expresses out loud of her issues with David for not telling her about being poisoned by the Dreamshade. David tells Mary Margaret that it is because he was afraid. For, he knew she wouldn't leave him and did not want her to be trapped in Neverland forever. However, Mary Margaret tells David that she would gladly spend her life in tree houses and dodging darts if it means being with him. The two then stop fighting and hug each other. The five members then arrive at Tinker Bell's, where Tinker Bell sees Neal for the first time since his escape and he shows proof of the captured shadow, which now gives the regrouped individuals the advantage needed to rescue Henry.

Meanwhile, at Pan's camp, Henry begins to start doubting Pan, who visits one of the cages to check on and then release a prisoner, who is revealed to be Wendy, whom Pan wants to have come out and play. As Pan tells Felix to go to another part of the island, Henry secretly follows Felix, leading Henry to a location where he discovers Wendy in bed, claiming that she is sick; she tells Henry that the powers on this island are fading fast, which is affecting her. Henry vows that he will save her and promises that he will come back for help, not knowing that Wendy was being used as bait by Pan, who emerges from hiding to congratulate her on convincing Henry to believe in Pan again before sending Wendy back to the cage.

Pan, feigning surprise, meets Henry on his way back, who confronts him about Wendy and the fading magic. Seeing this as an opportunity to let Henry believe that he can save Wendy, he shows Henry Skull Rock, stating that that is where he needs to go to save magic. A determined Henry accepts the challenge.

== Cultural references ==
A Star Wars allusion was used when Gold asked Belle for her help when the sand dollar beamed a hologram image of him.

Also, Leroy tells the dwarfs "No time for whistling, boys", making a reference to "Whistle While You Work" from Snow White and the Seven Dwarfs.

Ariel's entry into the present day for the first time and being intrigued by what she sees while seeking out Belle parallels a similar scene from the 1984 film Splash.

Michael Darling/Keychain has a teddy bear on his rear view mirror, a reference to the teddy bear that he had in Peter Pan.

Ariel says "Look at this stuff" in Mr. Gold's shop, which is the first sentence in the song 'Part of your World' from The Little Mermaid.

There is also a reference to the movie The Neverending Story in where Wendy lies to Henry on behalf of Pan claiming that because magic is dying so is she. She is connected to its fate so to speak. In the Neverending Story the Empress too is dying because of lack of faith and belief in the human world, and that it would take Bastion to save her. Pan convinces Henry it's up to him to save Wendy.

== Production ==
Guy Ferland directed this episode, with Kalinda Vazquez and Andrew Chambliss sharing writing duties.

== Reception ==
=== Ratings ===
After a two-week increase in the ratings, the episode posted a 2.1/5 among 18-49s, with 6.71 million viewers tuning in. On this night with the exception of NFL Football, a majority of Sunday night programming were also down across the board as well.

=== Critical reception ===
The episode received positive reviews from critics, starting with Hillary Busis of Entertainment Weekly who commented positively on the episode's pace and change of scenery, saying "After weeks of running in place, tonight's episode felt pretty action-packed from start to finish. What's more, it actually advanced season 3's master plot. Thanks to the events of "Dark Hollow," Rumpel and Regina have secured a tool that can defeat Pan; the MBC has secured a way to leave Never Land; and Pan has secured the help of Henry, who's been tricked into finally helping the ageless boy save Never Land's magic—or whatever Pan is actually using Henry to do. What's more, Ariel got legs, Belle got a renewed sense of hope, and we got a peak inside Pan's other bamboo box. (Welcome to the game, Wendy!)"

Alyse Whitney of Wetpaint also gave the episode a positive review, saying "this was a great character-driven episode, and though Snow and Charming’s feuding didn’t do much, it all led to working with Tinker Bell again, and we’ll see them storm Pan’s camp next week. Considering that Henry finally gave in and is embarking on his own journey to Skull Rock, who knows what will happen, but at least we have the hope that our favorite pairings will be reunited, right?"

Amy Ratcliffe of IGN gave the episode a 7.7 out of 10, signaling generally positive reviews, saying "Tonight's return to Storybrooke was needed both for the change of setting and the comfort of seeing familiar faces. The delivery felt clunky, but we had some fun scenes with Ariel and Belle and the return of the Darlings was an enjoyable surprise. The characters on the island had some moments, especially Hook, but it looks like the real action will happen next week." She also commented highly on Ariel's return, saying "JoAnna Garcia continues to be a bright spot as Ariel and she and Belle working together could kill audiences with adorableness. Ariel hits the exact innocent note you'd expect, making me just want to pinch her cheeks repeatedly. Her optimism and spunk is infectious. Plus, Ariel pairs well with Belle - both as actors and as characters;" though was a little more critical on the episode's effects, saying " the effects in "Dark Hollow" weren't bad. The red lighting effectively communicated the creepy vibe, and the shadows looked menacing. The creatures were a little rough around the edges but only a bit. And since they're fantasy shadows, it worked okay. Since this episode only had a few of the horrible digital backgrounds, it gets extra points from me."

Gwen Ihnat of The A.V. Club graded the episode a B−, signaling moderate reviews, and commenting positively on the Storybrooke subplot, saying

Joanna Garcia Swisher continues her delightful portrayal as the slightly clueless Ariel, and the adventure-minded Belle (Emilie de Ravin) proves herself to be a good choice as Rumplestiltskin’s girlfriend: Just this week she has to perform a cloaking spell, find Pandora’s box, and get held up by fugitives from the Darling family. It’s nice to see Storybrooke again (we get to see some daylight!), even though our neighbors are now limited to Jiminy Cricket, the Blue Fairy, Grandma, and the dwarves. But just when we thought we were safe from never hearing the words “Home Office” again, we find that our village interlopers are John and Michael Darling, who for some reason have aged a bit more than their sister, who is the other person in the cage (for about a hundred years). The John and Michael reveal is a welcome surprise, especially since it leads to a reappearance of Freya Tingley as Wendy, who was so entrancing in her scenes with the young Bae last season.

She was, however, more critical of the events in Neverland, specifically on the love triangle between Emma, Hook, and Neal, saying "I had higher hopes for this triangle, especially considering Neal’s time on Hook’s ship when he was a boy, but it has descended into an extremely trite storyline not even soap-worthy." She also commented negatively on the season's pace, saying "I’m almost feeling as dragged along as Henry is. OUAT is past the point of needing to bring the Save Henry saga to a close. Let’s hope next week leads to a showdown of sorts: More action, less traipsing through the neverending island greenery."

Christine Orlando of TV Fanatic gave the episode a 4.5 out of 5, stating that "I found Ariel a lot more fun this week. Perhaps it was the fish out of water scenario she personified," but then added "My biggest complaint about the entire episode was that there was so little Regina, but that didn't stop her presence from being felt. Her teaching skills already have Emma starting fires in the middle of windstorms. There's no telling how powerful these two women could be if they ever truly teamed up."
