= Murder of Christine Silawan =

2019 murder in Lapu-Lapu City, Philippines

- Location: Lapu-Lapu City, Cebu, Philippines
- Date: March 10, 2019; 7 years ago Between 6–7 pm (PhST)
- Attack type: Stabbing, rape, mutilation
- Deaths: Christine Silawan
- Motive: Jealousy

Christine Lee Silawan (March 26, 2002 – March 10, 2019) was a high school student who was found murdered in a vacant lot in Lapu-Lapu City, Cebu. Her body was discovered with multiple stab wounds, while her face was mutilated beyond recognition. She was naked from the waist down; authorities later determined that she had been raped.

== Murder ==
On March 11, 2019, 16-year-old student Christine Lee Silawan was found dead in a vacant lot in Lapu-Lapu City with multiple stab wounds and her face mutilated. Before her murder, it was reported that Silawan's unidentified boyfriend supposedly used a fake Facebook account to lure her into meeting him. Investigators discovered that the suspect had posed as another man on Facebook, trying to "court" her.

An autopsy also revealed that her tongue, trachea, esophagus, parts of her neck, and her right ear were missing.

== Investigation and aftermath ==
Jonas Martel Bueno, who was arrested for the murder of a 62-year-old farmer in Danao City, Cebu, denied involvement in Silawan's murder. Police said the style of the killings in Danao were "strikingly similar" to that of Silawan.

The murder suspect, identified as "John", was arrested at his home in Barangay Maribago of Lapu-Lapu on March 16, 2019, based on conversations exchanged on Facebook Messenger. According to the Department of Social Welfare and Development (DSWD), if Silawan's ex-boyfriend known only as John killed her, he could be charged in court. John passed the discernment procedure conducted on him.

Forensic investigators said Silawan was murdered between 6 p.m. and 7 p.m. on March 10, 2019. March 10 CCTV footage shows Silawan walking with a man in the early evening; this was the last known footage of her. Authorities said Silawan broke up with John a few days before her murder, adding that they were looking at jealousy as the possible motive. The Philippine National Police (PNP) earlier said that at least three persons could have committed the murder. However, the allegations against the suspect were baseless according to the suspect's relative, who said he was playing basketball with his friends and doing household chores on the day of her murder. The suspect's mother said her son was innocent and instead called for the capture of the real perpetrator. The suspect's mother added that her son would have been on the run had he committed the murder. The suspect opened the door for the NBI, who filed the search warrant on him. According to the NBI, they based their suspicions on eyewitness testimony. CCTV footage showed the victim walking hurriedly away from the church being followed by the man at 6:12 pm — contrary to the mother's claim that he was playing basketball. According to the teenager's friend, who was selling food near the basketball court, he bought a balut around 7:00 pm or 8:00 pm and then went home.

The NBI reviewed Facebook Messenger exchanges between the suspect and Silawan and found deleted messages. They were also looking for evidence of the suspect's use of a fake account to lure the victim into meeting her on March 10. The suspect underwent a drug test, which was negative. The NBI said the suspect was a former lover of the victim, and he was charged with murder despite denying committing the crime. Silawan's mother, Lourdes Silawan, said she was convinced that the suspect and other cohorts committed the crime. The PNP declared the case closed on March 19, but said it would continue to search for two other suspects.

The killing provoked controversy and political debate over the proposed reinstatement of the death penalty as a punishment for heinous crimes.

The Public Attorney's Office forensic team confirmed on April 2, 2019, that Silawan was raped. Bleeding was found in her genitals and acid was possibly poured on her face before being peeled off. The victim was also confirmed strangled to death using a rope, and the team suspected that at least three people may have been involved.

On April 9, murder suspect Renato Llenes was arrested by the police where he made an "extra-judicial confession" for killing her, but entered "not guilty" plea on the murder charges. Llenes claimed that his crime was inspired by Momo Challenge–which was prevalent at the time. On May 24, 2020, Llenes was reported to have hanged himself.

== See also ==
- Slender Man stabbing – 2014 attempted murder in Waukesha, Wisconsin
