= Strangulation in domestic violence =

Potentially lethal form of assault

Strangulation in the context of domestic violence is a potentially lethal form of assault. Unconsciousness may occur within seconds of strangulation and death within minutes. Strangulation can be difficult to detect and until recently was often not treated as a serious crime. However, in many jurisdictions, strangulation is now a specific criminal offense, or an aggravating factor in assault cases.

== Differences from choking ==
Although sometimes the words are used interchangeably, "strangulation" and "choking" are not the same thing. Choking is when air flow is blocked by food or a foreign object in the trachea – something that can be addressed by the Heimlich maneuver. Strangulation, by contrast, is defined by reduced air flow and/or blood flow to or from the brain via the intentional external compression of blood vessels or the airway in the neck. Notably, however, many victims of strangulation refer to the assault as "choking".

Both manual strangulation (i.e., gripping the throat with one's hands) and ligature strangulation (e.g., belts, scarves) have been reported in intimate partner violence cases.

== Epidemiology ==
A systematic review of 23 articles based on 11 surveys in 9 countries (N=74,785, about two-thirds of whom were women) found that 3.0% to 9.7% of women reported that they had at some time been strangled by an intimate partner. A total of 0.4% to 2.4% – with 1.0% being typical – reported that they had experienced it in the past year, and women were between 2 times and 14 times more likely to be strangled by an intimate partner than were men.

The 2010 national survey in the U.S. that asked about strangulation by an intimate partner asked 16,507 adults (55% of whom were women) if a partner had tried to hurt them by choking or suffocating them. A total of 9.7% responded that a partner had done so at some point in their lifetime; 0.9% reported that it had happened during the past year.

The prevalence of strangulation appears to be decreasing in Canada, the only country with multiple cross-sectional surveys that measure strangulation.

The first major study of surviving victims of strangulation assault found that 99% of the 300 victims in criminal cases involving "choking" were female. In 2000, a meta-analytic review of gender differences in physical aggression against a heterosexual partner concluded that ". ..'choke or strangle' is very clearly a male act, whether based on self- or partner reports." A similar conclusion was reached in a 2014 multi-nation review: "…women are more likely than men to report that they were strangled by an intimate partner."

A series of studies conducted in Canada found the same gender discrepancy and reported that strangulation by an intimate is more common among disabled persons, cohabiting (vs. married) persons, and those in a step- (vs. biological) family. Women who had been abused by an intimate partner reported higher rates of strangulation.

Strangulation is sometimes fatal. According to a large U.S. case control study, prior strangulation is a substantial and unique predictor of attempted and completed homicide of women by a male intimate partner. The study showed that the odds of becoming an attempted homicide victim increased 7-fold and the odds of becoming a homicide victim increased 8-fold for women who had been strangled by their partner. When over three dozen other characteristics of the victim, perpetrator, and incident were taken into account, however, strangulation no longer was a unique predictor. Strangulation is so common in battering (50% or more battered women report that they've been strangled) that it doesn't differentiate abuse in which the victim survives or dies.

== Experience of strangulation ==
Strangulation has been likened to drowning and researchers at the University of Pennsylvania have likened non- or near-fatal strangulation to water boarding, which is widely considered a form of torture.

A special issue of the Domestic Violence Report devoted to the crime of strangulation states: "Many domestic violence offenders and rapists do not strangle their partners to kill them; they strangle them to let them know they can kill them—any time they wish. Once victims know this truth, they live under the power and control of their abusers day in and day out."

== Outcomes ==
Strangulation can produce minor injuries, serious bodily injury, and death. Evidence of the assault can be difficult to detect because many victims may not have visible injuries and/or their symptoms may be nonspecific.

Victims may have internal injuries, such as laryngo-tracheal injuries, gastrointestinal tract injuries, vascular injuries, nervous system injuries and orthopedic injuries. Clinical symptoms of these internal injuries may include neck and sore-throat pain, voice changes (hoarse or raspy voice or the inability to speak), coughing, swallowing abnormalities, and changes in mental status, consciousness and behavior. Neurological symptoms may include vision changes, dimming, blurring, decrease of peripheral vision and seeing "stars" or "flashing lights." Post-anoxic encephalopathy, psychosis, seizures, amnesia, cerebrovascular accident and progressive dementia may be indicative of neuropsychiatric effects.

Signs of life-threatening or near fatal strangulation may include sight impairment, loss of consciousness, loss of urine or feces during the assault, and especially petechiae (pinpoint hemorrhages). Even victims with seemingly minimal injuries and/or symptoms may die hours, days, or weeks later because of progressive, irreversible encephalopathy.

Some visible signs of strangulation a victim may incur include injuries to the face, eyes, ears, nose, mouth, chin, neck, head, scalp, chest and shoulders: redness, scratches or abrasions, fingernail impressions in the skin, deep fingernail claw marks, ligature marks ("rope burns"), thumbprint-shaped bruises, blood-red eyes, pinpoint red spots called "petechiae" or blue fingernails.

== Laws ==
Because of involvement of the medical profession, specialized training for police and prosecutors, and ongoing research, strangulation has become a focus of policymakers and professionals working to reduce intimate partner violence and sexual assault.

As of November 2014, 44 U.S. states, the District of Columbia, the federal government and two territories have some form of strangulation or impeded breathing statute. Twenty-three states and one territory have enacted legislation making strangulation a felony. One state legislature, Utah, passed a joint resolution which made legislative findings that can help prosecutors apply existing assault statutes with a special emphasis on non-fatal strangulation assaults. In 2013, Congress re-authorized the Violence Against Women Act and added, for the first time, strangulation and suffocation as a specific federal felony.

== Improving detection and intervention ==
Starting in 1995, the work of Gael Strack and Casey Gwinn in San Diego has helped identify and address challenges in detecting, investigating, and prosecuting strangulation and suffocation offenses in intimate partner violence, sexual assault, elder abuse, and child abuse cases. In 2011, Strack and Gwinn created the Training Institute on Strangulation Prevention, the most comprehensive training program in the United States for the documentation, investigation, and prosecution of non and near-fatal strangulation assaults. They have published multiple state-specific books to guide the investigation and prosecution of non and near-fatal strangulation assaults.

== See also ==
- Child abuse
