= Momo Challenge hoax =

Internet hoax

The sculpture often associated with the hoax, originally created by Japanese artist Keisuke Aiso

The "Momo Challenge" was an internet hoax and urban legend that was rumoured to spread through social media and other outlets as a creepypasta. It was reported that children and adolescents were being harassed by a user named Momo to perform a series of dangerous tasks including violent attacks, self-harm, harming others, and suicide, mirroring the earlier Blue Whale Challenge. Despite claims that the phenomenon had reached worldwide proportions in July 2018, the number of actual complaints were relatively small and many law enforcement agencies have not been able to confirm that anyone was harmed as a direct result of it. Moreover, the Momo Challenge sparked global panic and prompted urgent warnings from authorities and child safety advocates. Reports of children encountering Momo's disturbing messages circulated widely, causing heightened fears among parents and caregivers. The hoax lasted until April 2020.

== Chronology ==
=== Internet scare ===
Discussions among YouTube commentators about a new internet phenomenon promoting self-harm similar to the Blue Whale Challenge from Russia surfaced in July 2018, followed in August by news items reporting allegations that cases of self-harm by children in South America and India had been prompted by WhatsApp messages. Reports were based on stories of teenagers being targeted by people presenting themselves as a character named Momo, trying to persuade people to contact them through their cell phones. As with the aforementioned Blue Whale Challenge, and Internet hoaxes similar to Momo presented as challenges, players are then instructed to perform a series of tasks; refusal to do so is met with threats and gory pictures.

In France, a group at the Ministry of the Interior was reviewing the situation daily in late July 2018. Public warnings were issued in August and September by police forces in countries including Argentina, Germany, Luxembourg, Spain, Canada, Mexico and the United States.

A representation of the Momo character appeared in the popular game Minecraft in the form of player-made game skins and an unofficial mod created by the game's users. A police officer in Ohio was concerned to see Momo in his son's copy of the game, worried about the possibility that the mod could lead to participation in the Momo Challenge. After news reports started to outline the link between the Minecraft mod and the Momo Challenge, Microsoft announced it was taking measures to "restrict access to the mod" in question.

After weeks of news coverage about unconfirmed cases and warnings issued by the West Bengal police and the Mumbai police, India's Central Bureau of Investigation (CBI) in West Bengal indicated on August 29, 2018, that claims reported in the media about the death of two teens being linked to the Momo Challenge were "far fetched and devoid of any evidence". CBI believed most of the large volume of Momo Challenge invitations in India originate locally as pranks sent to spread panic. A CBI spokesperson stated that "so far, the game has not claimed any victim, nor has anyone approached us saying they have played even the first level of it." The police could not confirm any role the Momo Challenge might have played in the death of a girl in grade 10 who died by suicide after leaving a note expressing discouragement with lower grades or the suicide of an engineering student in Chennai. The Odisha Police already issued an advisory asking the media to refrain from publishing unconfirmed reports linking teen death to the Momo Challenge.

Pakistan's Minister of Information Technology announced that the government intended to draft legislation making it a crime to distribute both the Momo Challenge and the Blue Whale Challenge.

WhatsApp encouraged its users to block phone numbers engaging in this practice and to report them to the company. By September 2018, most phone numbers supposedly associated with "Momo" were out of service and the news coverage of the phenomenon decreased.

Police in the Philippines issued warnings to parents to be vigilant of their children's online activity after an 11-year-old boy died from apparent suicide by drug overdose on 11 January 2019, linking the incident to the viral challenge, although no official confirmation of direct relation to the incident has been established by the authorities. In the aftermath of the reports, Raffy Tulfo and other YouTubers voiced their condolences to the family, encouraging that children be monitored by their parents. They also linked the Blue Whale Challenge to the incident. On March 10, 16-year-old Christine Silawan was found murdered, with her face skinned beyond recognition. The main suspect in her case reportedly was influenced by the Momo challenge.

=== Worldwide moral panic ===
In February 2019, the Police Service of Northern Ireland posted a public warning on Facebook, and American media personality Kim Kardashian posted on her Instagram Story pleading for YouTube to remove alleged "Momo" videos. At that point, people reported seeing Momo pop up on a variety of platforms, including YouTube and YouTube Kids videos about Peppa Pig and Fortnite. The hoax had reached the status of a worldwide moral panic. More advisories were issued from police forces, schools and organizations dedicated to internet consumer safety, although some of the warnings were more concerned with identity theft by cybercriminals than the possibility of self-harm.

By March, several experts including the Children's Commissioner for England were asking the media and authorities to cease amplifying what increasingly looked like a case of moral panic. Authorities had not confirmed any physical harm resulting from the phenomenon, or even that any sustained exchange of messages took place between the Momo character and anybody. Responding to tabloid coverage which asserted the challenge to be true, the NSPCC, the Samaritans, and the UK Safer Internet Centre declared the Momo Challenge a hoax. A parent who alerted the press to the Momo Challenge subsequently said her child had not received messages from "Momo", but was merely told about it in a school playground conversation.

== Analysis ==
Web security experts and folklorists studying urban legends have stated that the phenomenon is likely a case of moral panic: a sensationalized hoax fuelled by unverified media reports. Benjamin Radford stated that "the Blue Whale Game and the Momo Challenge have all the hallmarks of a classic moral panic", "fuelled by parents' fears in wanting to know what their kids are up to. There's an inherent fear in what young people are doing with technology."

The founder of fact-checking site Snopes, David Mikkelson, doubts anybody actually came to any harm and said the whole thing "may primarily be a product of bullies and pranksters latching onto a handy mechanism to goad and torment vulnerable youngsters rather than an intrinsic part of a particular social media challenge."

In response to the reports in early 2019, YouTube has said that it has "not received any links to videos showing or promoting the Momo challenge on YouTube" but permits news stories and videos intended to raise awareness of and educate against the alleged phenomenon. The website has demonetized all videos mentioning Momo, including those of news organizations, saying such content violates its advertiser-friendly content guidelines. It has also placed advisory warnings on some Momo videos alerting viewers of "inappropriate or offensive" content.

== Picture ==
Early news reports stating the image of Momo was of a sculpture by Japanese artist Midori Hayashi turned out to be incorrect. Hayashi indicated that it was not her piece, and Internet users identified Link Factory, a Japanese special effects company, as the correct author of the sculpture.

The woman-like sculpture has pale, distorted skin, with long, unkempt hair. Its lidless eyes protrude outwards, creating a haunting effect, much similar to a potoo, while its mouth is unnaturally wide, with a bare-toothed grin adding to its eerie demeanor. Pictures of the sculpture were first posted online in 2016, when it was publicly exhibited. The firm denies any involvement with the hoax. Japanese artist Keisuke Aiso, the original creator of the sculpture, confirmed in March 2019 that the sculpture had been thrown away in 2018, after its materials (natural rubber and plant oils) had decomposed.

== In popular culture ==
On March 9, 2019, Saturday Night Live parodied the meme with a video featuring Kate McKinnon as an unsettling chicken-suited fast food mascot named "Bok Bok," whom the narrator says "does bear a slight resemblance to the internet urban legend Momo." The narrator says, "We promise, Bok Bok is not Momo in a chicken suit," despite also being "a human-bird hybrid that loves the company of children." At the end, the narrator admits, "Yeah, that's probably Momo."

The plot of the 2022 teen horror movie Grimcutty is a direct reference to the Momo Challenge.

In July 2019, Orion Pictures said it was developing a film adaptation, with producers Roy Lee (with his production company Vertigo Entertainment) and Taka Ichise.

== See also ==
- Blue Whale Challenge, a similar alleged 'suicide game' revolving around the Internet
- Slender Man stabbing, a similar moral panic surrounding a creepypasta character
- Choking game
- Blackout challenge
- Moral panic
