= The Choking Game =

2014 American television drama film

- theatrical poster
- Genre: Drama; Psychological drama
- Based on: Choke by Diana Lopez
- Teleplay by: Jen Klein
- Directed by: Lane Shefter Bishop
- Starring: Freya Tingley; Alexa Rose Steele (as "Alex Steele"); Beverly Ndukwu; Mitch Ainley; Ferron Guerreiro
- Music by: Shawn Pierce
- Country of origin: United States
- Original language: English

Production
- Executive producers: Orly Adelson; Marilyn R. Atlas; Jonathan Eskenas; Lane Shefter Bishop
- Producers: Paul D. Goldman; Juliette Hagopian
- Production location: United States
- Cinematography: Michael Marshall
- Editor: Erik C. Andersen
- Running time: 83 minutes
- Production companies: Lifetime Movie Network; Orly Adelson Productions

Original release
- Network: Lifetime Movie Network
- Release: July 26, 2014

The Choking Game is a 2014 American psychological drama made-for-television film about two high school seniors who become enthralled with the habit of self-asphyxiation. The film, which is based on the book Choke by Diana Lopez, is directed by Lane Shefter Bishop and stars Freya Tingley, Alexa Rose Steele, Beverly Ndukwu, Mitch Ainley and Ferron Guerreiro. It received mixed reviews from critics, and attention from psychology websites, owing largely to it being the only mainstream film of its time to cover the choking game phenomenon.

== Plot ==
Taryn (Freya Tingley) is starting her first day as a high school senior. Her overbearing mother, Heidi (Peri Gilpin), pressures her constantly with everything from SAT tests to the prom, even going behind Taryn's back and switching her free period in her schedule to the yearbook club, which Taryn has no time for, adding further strain to her day. Taryn confides in her nonconformist best friend Elena (Beverly Ndukwu) that she has a crush on her childhood friend Ryder (Mitch Ainley), but that she doesn't think he feels the same way, even though he recently broke up with his girlfriend of three months over the summer. The most popular girl in school, Courtney (Ferron Guerreiro), informs Taryn and Elena that a new girl has arrived to their school, named Nina (Alex Steele), who according to rumour was into some "hardcore stuff". Courtney is a bully, and so the girls take little notice of her words. When Taryn enters the girls' washroom alone, she comes across Nina passed out on the floor, lying beside one of the toilets, but Nina assures her that everything is alright and begs her not to tell anybody. Taryn covers for Nina by telling Courtney that Nina was just helping her look for her contact lenses.

Taryn and Nina soon become friends, much to the surprise of Elena, who finds Nina loud and rebellious, whereas Taryn is studious and athletic. Nina lives with her mother (Julia Arkos), a cougar who is rarely ever home and who goes on dates with random younger men, leaving Nina to her own devices. Taryn finds Nina's lack of parental supervision exciting, whereas Nina wistfully admires Taryn's more nuclear family unit. After an embarrassing encounter with Ryder at a coffee shop when Courtney interrupts, Taryn complains about her life, after which Nina shows her "the choking game", a way in which one can get high without actually using drugs, through a method of pressing their hands around their own neck until they pass out, or by having a proxy do it. This comes in use for both girls, who can choke each other out so that one can keep watch while the other is unconscious, but it nearly backfires twice: at one point Taryn's mother hears the girls panicking and suspects that something strange is going on, and at another point, Courtney catches the pair in a hidden corridor of the school gymnasium. Nevertheless, the "game" persists, and Taryn becomes more rebellious, losing touch with Elena, talking back to Courtney, snapping at her parents, dressing differently and letting her high grade score decline, which will destroy her chances of going with Elena to Michigan State University the next year. Nina and Taryn crash Courtney's autumn house party, where Taryn attempts to force herself on Ryder, making a fool out of herself and breaking off her birthday plans to go out to a restaurant with Elena. Elena confronts Taryn, who in turn yells at her and flees.

After Taryn's mother and father (Ray Galletti) confront her over her poor behaviour, Taryn hopes to start things over. While driving to Nina's house, however, she comes across an ambulance and a group of paramedics removing an unconscious, bleeding Nina from the front doorway on a stretcher while Nina's mother sobs hysterically outside. When Taryn returns to school, everybody avoids Taryn, except for Elena, who says that while they're no longer friends anymore, they may be friends again one day. Taryn comes across Courtney in the bathroom, who has taken up the "game" herself. Courtney insists that she won't "end up like Nina", who has failed to return to school at all. Taryn tells Courtney that she's there if she needs to talk. Courtney, despite walking off in a huff, has tears down her face and nods her head in affirmation. That afternoon, Taryn and her mother go to Nina's house, where Taryn goes up to her bedroom and finds Nina with severe brain damage, dressed in a pair of black elastic incontinence pants and unable to walk properly or focus on anything. She attempts to stand up, but nearly collapses. Taryn reaches out to steady her, only to discover an enormous purple bruise over Nina's left eye that spans most of her head. Nina attempts to speak, but can only make guttural noises because she has permanently damaged her vocal cords. Taryn apologizes to Ryder for her behaviour later that day, and reveals to him that Nina hit her head while playing the "game", rendering her indefinitely disabled. Ryder accepts Taryn's apology, and the two start a romantic relationship.

== Cast ==
- Freya Tingley as Taryn
- Alexa Rose Steele (as "Alex Steele") as Nina
- Beverly Ndukwu as Elena
- Mitch Ainley as Ryder
- Ferron Guerreiro as Courtney
- Peri Gilpin as Heidi, Taryn's mother
- Ray Galletti as Will, Taryn's father
- Julia Arkos as Nina's mother
- Kristen Harris as Mrs. Moore (homeroom teacher)

== Reception ==
Announcement that Diana Lopez's book Choke was being adapted into The Choking Game was first released by Deadline, which shared the names of the main cast and crew and also the existing main characters. The Choking Game received a mixed critical reception. Christine Louise Hohlbaum of Psychology Today praised the realistic acting in particular, and also the honest way in how the film portrayed the dangers of "the choking game". Pilot Viruet of Flavorwire mocked the film for being preachy and a "two-hour Public Service Announcement", noting the film for bizarre scenes including a subplot involving a cupcake that the main character's crush left in her locker. "On Taryn’s 18th birthday, she finds a cupcake in her locker and (incorrectly) assumes that her mother put it there. She’s so angry about the cupcake that she gets into a screaming fight with her mom and runs off with Nina to choke herself before attending a party. “Screw my grades. Screw my mom. Screw it all,” she proclaims at one point, still thinking about the cupcake." Critic Marc Fusion had a more neutral opinion of the film, stating, "The Choking Game shows that all kinds of teens were involved in this dangerous game and makes a point that parents need to stay vigilant, even if their children are studious and otherwise make educated choices in life. At the same time, it also does sensationalize the process involved, almost turning it into a ritual of sorts and by the end, we are led to believe that almost everyone at Taryn’s school is involved in the game. But it wouldn’t be Lifetime without some overly dramatic elements, so no harm there. This one has all the drama, parental panic, and mean girl traits you’d expect from a Lifetime movie about high school, so for fans of the Lifetime style, this one is well recommended. No nakedness. The movie does turn the game into a fetish type process, but that’s the extent of the sexual elements."
