= Search Out =

2020 South Korean thriller film

- Theatrical release poster
- Hangul: 서치 아웃
- RR: Seochi aut
- MR: Sŏch'i aut
- Directed by: Kwak Jung
- Written by: Kwak Jung
- Produced by: Kim Gyung-won; Kim Bu-hyun
- Starring: Lee Si-eon; Kim Sung-cheol; Heo Ga-yoon
- Cinematography: Choi Jong-man
- Edited by: Choi Hyun-sook
- Music by: Oh Han-jung; Heo Yoo-ra
- Production companies: D&Y Entertainment; FY Entertainment
- Distributed by: Storm Pictures Korea
- Release date: April 15, 2020
- Running time: 92 minutes
- Country: South Korea
- Language: Korean

Search Out (Korean: 서치 아웃; RR: Seochi aut) is a 2020 South Korean thriller film written and directed by Kwak Jung, starring Lee Si-eon, Kim Sung-cheol and Heo Ga-yoon. Inspired by the Blue Whale Challenge, it was released on April 15, 2020.

== Plot ==
A trainee policeman, a job seeker and a hacker team up to find out who sent the message "What is the significance of your life?" to a woman who ended up committing suicide.

== Cast ==
=== Main ===
- Kim Sung-cheol as Joon-hyuk
- Heo Ga-yoon as Noo-ri
- Lee Si-eon as Sung-min

=== Supporting ===
- Go Jung-il as Detective Go
- Kim Ji-na as Ji-na
- Shim Wan-joon as Jin-woo
- Choi Yoon-bin as Detective
- Kim Seo-yeon as Seo-won
- Ju Shi-hyun as Jae-min
- Bae Sang-woo as Sociopath
- Lee Yeon-bin as Kyung-won

=== Special appearance ===
- Son Byong-ho as Convenience store boss

== Production ==
Director and screenwriter Kwak Jung "wanted to dig deep into how social media is misused as an instrument of crime, to raise awareness of social isolation among young adults and to discuss fundamental questions surrounding life and death."

== Release ==
The film was postponed by a week (being released on April 15, 2020 instead of April 9) due to the COVID-19 pandemic.

== Reception ==
The film topped the domestic box office on its release day despite the COVID-19 pandemic.
