= Think Lovely Thoughts =

- Once Upon a Time episode
- Episode no.: Season 3 Episode 8
- Directed by: David Solomon
- Written by: David H. Goodman & Robert Hull
- Production code: 308
- Original air date: November 17, 2013

Guest appearances
- Robbie Kay as Peter Pan; Rose McIver as Tinker Bell; Wyatt Oleff as Young Rumpelstiltskin; Colin Corrigan as Thug; Stephen Lord as Malcolm; Lindsey Collins as Spinster #1; Glynis Davies as Spinster #2; Freya Tingley as Wendy Darling; Marilyn Manson as The Shadow

Episode chronology
← Previous "Dark Hollow"	Next → "Save Henry"
- Once Upon a Time (season 3)

"Think Lovely Thoughts" is the eighth episode of the third season of the American fantasy drama series Once Upon a Time, and the show's 52nd episode overall.

In this episode, the group races to Skull Rock in order to save Henry (Jared S. Gilmore) from Peter Pan (Robbie Kay), who plans to harness immortality by taking Henry's heart. Meanwhile, a young Rumpelstiltskin (Wyatt Oleff) and his scheming father Malcolm (Stephen Lord) make their way to Neverland, which soon becomes a life-altering journey for both of them.

The episode was met with positive reviews from critics; however, the episode saw a significant drop in ratings, with 6.66 million viewers tuning in.

== Title card ==
The isle of Skull Rock in Neverland stands beyond the Enchanted Forest.

== Plot ==
=== Event Chronology ===
The Enchanted Forest events take place years after "The Black Fairy" and years before "Manhattan". The Neverland events take place after "Dark Hollow".

=== In the characters' past ===
In a local tavern yard, a young boy, who is revealed to be a young Rumplestiltskin, begs a man not to hurt his father Malcolm, who is a 3-card monte cheat. Later on, Malcolm brings Rumplestiltskin to a cabin and asks the women spinning wool to look after him as he attempts to get a real job. Before he goes, he gives his son the corn husk doll as a present. Hours later, the women see that Rumplestiltskin has a huge talent for spinning. While Rumplestiltskin tells them that he believed that Malcolm will come back, the ladies tell him that he returned to the same tavern. The women advise him to take the magic bean and go someplace where his father’s bad reputation won’t follow him. Rumplestiltskin later returns to the same tavern, and just as the ladies told him, sees his father playing games again. Rumplstiltskin coaxes Malcolm to go away somewhere and make a fresh start. Malcolm then remembers the phrase “think lovely thoughts,” which he used to comfort himself when he was apprenticed to a blacksmith. So they use the bean to go to a place called Neverland, holding hands.

As they land in Neverland, Malcolm tells his son to imagine a cake, and it appears. He then tells him that in Neverland anyone can fly, but as he attempts to take off, he falls to the ground because he is now a grown-up. Malcolm remembers needing Pixie Dust, but Rumplestiltskin is too scared to climb up the tall trees that have the pixie dust flowers, so Malcolm tells him to wait and he’ll get enough for both. He climbs up and sprinkles some dust on himself, saying “I want to fly,” but just then the shadow comes and mocks him, telling him he doesn’t belong. On the ground, Rumplestiltskin later weeps, thinking his father has met with an accident after one of his shoes falls from the tree, but then his father climbs down to comfort him, telling him that Neverland is only for children. Unfortunately, as Rumplestiltskin suggests they go somewhere else, Malcolm says he knows he would just go back to his old ways if he did, and that his son would be better off without him. The shadow then comes to take Rumplestiltskin, believing it is the only way Malcolm can believe he is a child. As the shadow takes Rumplestiltskin away, he witnesses a green spell coming over Malcolm, who suddenly turns into a young boy, and a look of regret briefly flashes across his face as he watches his son disappear into the sky. Upon returning to the women he tells them what happened, and the women believe that he would be better off without a father. Now young again, Malcolm notices the doll he gave his son on the ground, as Rumplestiltskin had dropped it while being taken away. He picks up the doll and adopts the name his son gave it as his own: Peter Pan.

Pan and the shadow then arrive at Skull Rock, where the shadow tells Pan that the island was created when Pan decided to stay, and the hourglass shows how much time he has before he stops being young and dies. In doing so, the shadow tells Pan that he broke the rules by staying because Neverland is a place for children to visit in their dreams. Pan counters that rules can be broken and vows to find a way to stay young forever.

=== In Neverland ===
As Emma Swan, Neal, Hook, David, Tinker Bell, and Mary Margaret walk through the forest towards Pan’s camp, Emma confronts Mary Margaret about staying behind with David, which made Emma concerned that she will once again be separated from her family. As Regina and Gold emerged from another location, the reunion does not go smoothly as Neal tells everyone involved that Gold was planning to kill Henry because of a prophecy. They all draw their weapons on him, but Gold proves his legitimacy by handing over Pandora’s Box to earn their trust, and tells Neal he has no idea who he’s up against as Gold explains to Neal that Pan was responsible for his father Malcolm's demise. Despite this, Neal made sure that Gold does not use magic and Gold agrees to it. Meanwhile, Hook and Emma discuss Neal’s fate and the future of David when Gold says he may know a cure, as he remembered the elixir that saved him back at Storybrooke. As they finally reach Pan’s camp, the party come up with a plan to keep The Lost Boys at bay, so Regina waves her hand and causes a sleeping spell and the Boys doze off. They then hear Wendy and Emma see her in cage, and Neal breaks her free. She’s startled to see Neal, whom she knew as Baelfire, now grown up. She explains that she went back to Neverland to save him, because she remembered Neal telling her that his parents were dead, to which a stunned Gold replied “You told them that?” But Bae says that it was better than saying his father abandoned him. At first, Wendy lies to the rescuers about where Pan is, but Gold recognizes she’s lying and she comes clean, and admits that Pan really wants the heart of the truest believer so he can be immortal, which is actually Henry's heart. It’s a trade, she says, because once Pan has the heart, Henry will die. Neal promises he will save her brothers and Regina tells Wendy that John and Michael are safe in Storybrooke. They make a plan to rescue Henry, and send David to Dead Man’s Peak to get water to make a cure. Emma then tells everyone involved that they will all return home once they rescue Henry. So Emma, Regina, Gold, and Neal race off to Skull Rock.

As the individuals prepare their plan of attack, Peter Pan (Robbie Kay) and Henry (Jared S. Gilmore) arrives at Skull Rock, where Pan tells Henry (who is unaware that Pan is actually his great grandfather) that he can save magic, and Henry believed him. As they enter the caves, Pan cast a protection spell to keep anyone with a shadow out. The individuals then reach the island, where Gold eventually penetrated the spell because he has no shadow. The other members finally believe that he wants to save Henry and Neal gives the box back to him, followed by Regina and Emma casting an eclipse spell so they can enter. Henry and Pan finally enter a large chamber that contains a large hourglass on top of a pedestal of golden skulls that shows the magic slowly fading, indicating how much time is left for magic in Neverland. After looking at this, Pan tells Henry it is time to save magic, but he now wants to use Henry's heart rather than believing in it, then lies to Henry that he'll live forever in Neverland if he does this. He then is interrupted by a presence, as Gold shows up to confront his father and to stop him from going through with this and takes out the box. Pan says they are really alike because both abandoned their sons, but Gold says he regretted leaving his son the moment he let him go and spent the rest of his life trying to get him back. Pan then reveals that he never forgot Rumplestiltskin as he asks “Why do you think I call myself Peter Pan?” implying that he wanted to remember his child despite his resentment of him. He asks Gold to put the box down so they can make a fresh start. After Gold refuses, he waves his hand over the box but nothing happens, as Gold discovers Pan switched boxes, and Pan waves his hand over the real one and places Gold inside it. Pan then returns to finish his scheme to take Henry's heart by giving him magic to allow him to remove it. As Henry succeeds in doing so, Emma, Regina and Neal arrive to stop Henry from giving it to Pan, but Pan tells Henry that they are lying to him because they are adults even as they tell Henry they believe in him because they love him. Unfortunately, Henry, believing that he can save magic, gives Pan his heart, with Pan now emerging victorious in his plot to become immortal. Henry collapses as a result, barely alive.

== Cultural references ==
When Rumple tells Neal that "Peter Pan destroyed my father", it is similar to a scene in Star Wars Episode IV: A New Hope, in which Obi-Wan Kenobi tells Luke Skywalker the story about a Jedi called Darth Vader who was a pupil of Kenobi before he turned to Evil and killed Luke's father.

Furthermore, the revelation that Peter Pan is actually Rumple's father is similar to another scene in The Empire Strikes Back where Vader reveals that he is Luke's father.

== Production ==
This episode features American musician Marilyn Manson as the voice of The Shadow. On October 21, British actor Stephen Lord was announced to be playing Rumplestiltskin's father, Malcolm/Colin. He featured in this episode, and will also feature on the eleventh episode of the season.

The detail and reveal of Peter Pan's true identity was kept a secret from cast members, who were banned from finding out until the episode aired. According to Ginnifer Goodwin, "We were so banned," she says. "We had to sign our lives away. That's truly the Rumple story, like we own the children. Some cast members saw it coming and I was shocked, but I guess it makes so much sense because the family is cursed. Each generation is caught in a cycle of sacrificing family for power and it only makes sense that Rumple would be the product of such a villain."

== Reception ==
=== Ratings ===
The episode saw another decline in the ratings, scoring a 1.9/5 among 18-49s with only 6.67 million tuning in, making it the lowest rated episode in the series so far and the only one to post below a 2.0. This setback can attributed to the debut of FOX's science fiction crime drama Almost Human, which had 3.1/8 among 18-49s with 9.18 million viewers watching, marking the first time that OUAT was beaten by another scripted program since its 2011 debut. It can also be attributed to television coverage of the November 17, 2013 tornado outbreak in several Midwestern states that was shown on ABC rather than Once Upon a Time.

=== Critical reception ===
The episode received generally positive reviews from critics.

Amy Ratcliffe of IGN gave the episode the second highest score of the season thus far, after "Ariel," giving in an 8.9 out of 10, saying "tonight's installment of Once was engaging, touching, and action-packed. The twists were complete surprises, and they didn't feel contrived. The rescue party was the most together they've been and it was fun to watch them jump into action. I felt more invested in the characters than I have at any other point this season, and I can't wait to see what happens next."

Hillary Busis of Entertainment Weekly commented "Just when you thought Henry's family tree couldn't get any more complicated, Once threw us another genuine curveball. On second thought, "curveball" doesn't seem emphatic enough. Let's call it a genuine "oh-my-God, holy-crap, did-they-seriously-just-say-what-I-think-they-said?" ball instead." She then added "Okay, I've made my point. Sense of history repeating aside, though, "Think Lovely Thoughts" really was full of surprises, thanks particularly to the fairyback that introduced us to a young, adorably big-eyed Rumpelstiltskin—back in the days when he was still being cared for by his ne'er-do-well dad, whose name is either Malcolm or Colin." The latter referring the character name that was a source of confusion in the casting credits before its air date.

Christine Orlando of TV Fanatic also gave the episode a positive review, rating it a 4.5 out of 5, noting Rumpelstiltskin's subplot, saying "the revelation that Peter Pan was actually Rumpel's father totally floored me. It ranked up there with watching The Empire Strikes Back when I was 9. I never saw it coming."

Andrea Reiher of Zap2it also commented positively on the episode, noting Marilyn Manson's role, saying he "was awesome as the voice of the Shadow -- super creepy and menacing."

Gwen Ihnat of The A.V. Club graded the episode a B, mostly directed at Jared S Gilmore's performance in the episode: "Almost from the very beginning, Henry has been Once Upon A Time’s sore spot. Some blame has been aimed at poor Jared S. Gilmore’s acting abilities, but let’s face it, Olivier himself couldn’t carry what the Henry character has had to endure."

Liane Bonin Starr of HitFix gave the episode a mixed review, saying "Things are now at their darkest, but somehow this in-between episode was still frustrating. Rumple was dismissed too quickly, Wendy spat out some exposition and then receded into the background, and Henry's bad decision didn't feel particularly well-played. I realize that Henry needed to commit fully to Pan, but I didn't feel Pan's case was ever entirely convincing -- not for a kid who only recently found his "real" parents. I guess Henry, being the good kid that he is, just wanted to do the right thing—even as his parents had tiny heart attacks watching him do it. I bet he's getting grounded when they all get back to Storybrooke!"

Gwen Orel of the Wall Street Journal called Rumpelstiltskin's subplot "by far the most unsettling backstory yet."
