= Strangling =

Compression of the neck that may lead to unconsciousness or death

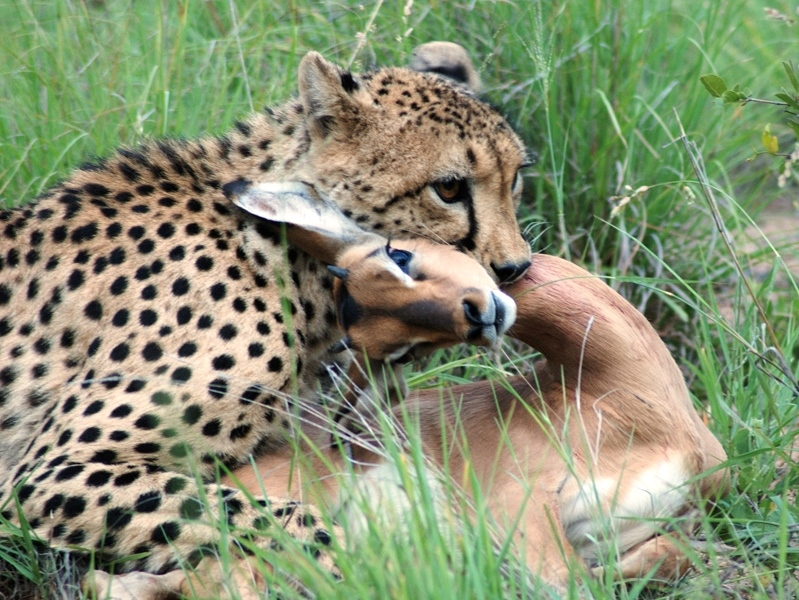
A cheetah strangling an impala, Timbavati Game Reserve, South Africa

Strangling or strangulation is the compression of the neck leading to an increasingly hypoxic state in the brain, which can lead to unconsciousness or even death. Fatal strangulation typically occurs in cases of violence, accidents, and is one of two main ways that hanging causes death (alongside breaking the victim's neck).

Strangling does not have to be fatal; limited or interrupted strangling is practiced in erotic asphyxia, in the choking game, and is an important technique in many combat sports and self-defense systems. Strangling can be divided into three general types according to the mechanism used:

- Hanging — Suspension from a cord wound around the neck
- Ligature strangulation — Strangulation without suspension using some form of cord-like object (ligature) called a garrote
- Manual strangulation — Strangulation using the fingers, hands, or other extremity

== General ==
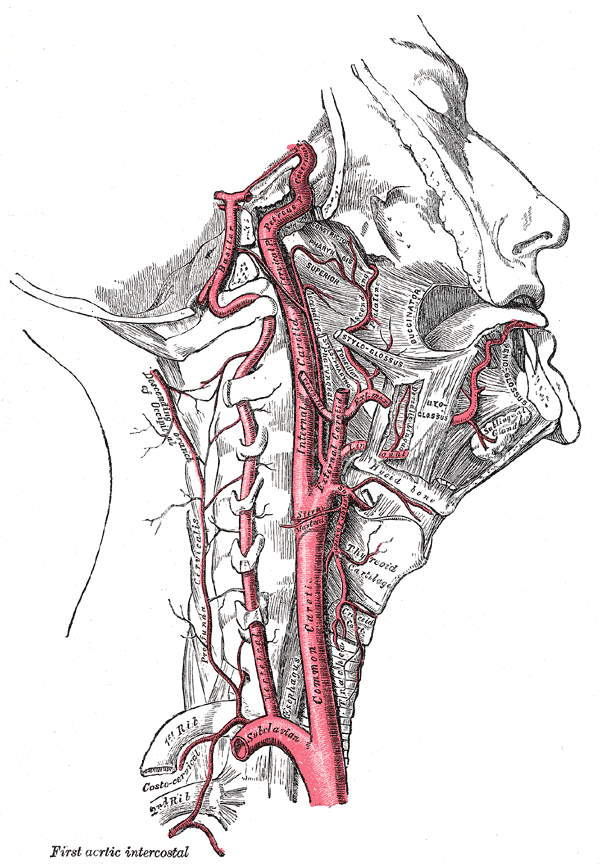
The neck contains several vulnerable targets for compression including the carotid arteries.

Strangling involves one or several mechanisms that interfere with the normal flow of oxygen into the brain:

- Compression of the carotid arteries or jugular veins—causing cerebral ischemia.
- Compression of the laryngopharynx, larynx, or trachea—causing asphyxia.
- Stimulation of the carotid sinus reflex—causing bradycardia, hypotension, or both.

Depending on the particular method of strangulation, one or several of these typically occur in combination; vascular obstruction is usually the main mechanism. Complete obstruction of blood flow to the brain is associated with irreversible neurological damage and death, but during strangulation there is still unimpeded blood flow in the vertebral arteries. Estimates have been made that significant occlusion of the carotid arteries and jugular veins occurs with a pressure of around 3.4 N/cm^{2} (4.9 psi), while the trachea demands six times more at approximately 22 N/cm^{2} (32 psi).

As in all cases of strangulation, the rapidity of death can be affected by the susceptibility to carotid sinus stimulation. Carotid sinus reflex death is sometimes considered a mechanism of death in cases of strangulation, but it remains highly disputed. The reported time from application to unconsciousness varies from 7-14 seconds if effectively applied to one minute in other cases, with death occurring minutes after unconsciousness.

== Manual strangulation ==
Manual strangulation (also known as "throttling") is strangling with the hands, fingers, or other extremities and sometimes also with blunt objects, such as batons. Depending on how the strangling is performed, it may compress the airway, interfere with the flow of blood in the neck, or work as a combination of the two. Consequently, manual strangulation may damage the larynx and fracture the hyoid or other bones in the neck. In cases of airway compression, manual strangling leads to the frightening sensation of air hunger and may induce violent struggling.

Manual strangulation is common in situations of domestic violence, and is regarded by experts as an especially severe form of domestic violence, due to its extremely frightening and potentially lethal nature, and an observed correlation between non-fatal strangulation in domestic violence and future homicide. In manual strangulation the scratch marks found on a victim's neck are frequently self-inflicted, produced as the victim claws at the assailant's hands.

Manual strangulation also has a history as a form of capital punishment. During the 18th century, a sentence of "Death by Throttling" would be passed upon the verdict of a court martial for the crime of desertion from the British Army.

More technical variants of manual strangulation are referred to as strangleholds, or chokeholds (despite the term "choke" more technically referring to internal airway restriction), and are extensively practised and used in various martial arts, combat sports, self-defense systems, and in military hand-to-hand combat application. In some martial arts like judo, Brazilian jiu-jitsu, and jujutsu, when applied correctly and released promptly after loss of consciousness, strangleholds that constrict blood flow are regarded as a safer means to render an opponent unconscious, when compared to other methods, especially strikes to the head, the latter of which can cause potentially catastrophic or fatal and irreversible brain injuries much more quickly and unpredictably.

== Ligature strangulation ==
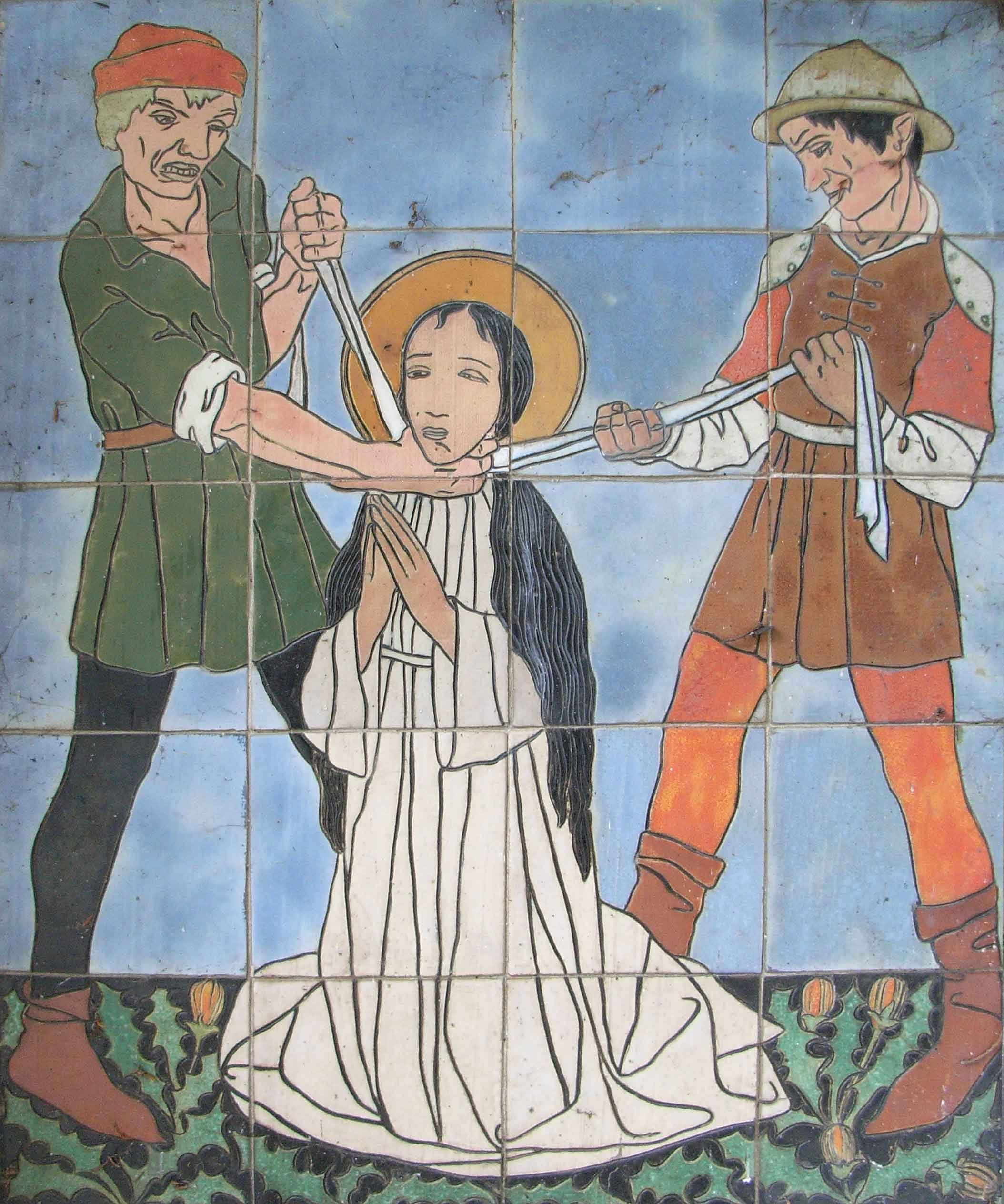
Illustration depicting the ligature strangulation of Saint Godelieve

Ligature strangulation or garroting is strangling with some form of cord such as rope, wire, chain, or shoelaces (a garrote) either partially or fully circumferencing the neck. Even though the mechanism of strangulation is similar, it is usually distinguished from hanging by the strangling force being something other than the person's own body weight. Incomplete occlusion of the carotid arteries is expected and, in cases of homicide, the victim may struggle for a period of time, with unconsciousness typically occurring in 10 to 15 seconds. Cases of ligature strangulation generally involve homicides of women, children, and the elderly. Compared to hanging, the ligature mark will most likely be located lower on the neck of the victim.

During the Spanish Inquisition, victims who admitted their alleged sins and recanted were killed via ligature strangulation (i.e. the garrote) before their bodies were burnt during the auto-da-fé. Throughout much of the 20th and 21st centuries, the American Mafia used ligature strangulation as a means of murdering their victims. Confessed American serial killer Altemio Sanchez used ligature strangulation in the rapes and/or murders of his victims, as did Gary Ridgway (the Green River Killer) and the Scottish serial killer Dennis Nilsen.

Incaprettamento (derived from a term meaning "to tie up like a kid goat") is a method of strangulation in which the victim's neck is tied to his/her legs bent behind his/her back (similar to a hogtie), so that the victim must bend his/her legs in order to loosen the rope and breathe; inevitably, the victim would become exhausted and die of strangulation. This method was common throughout Neolithic Europe, and occurred for over two thousands years in northern and southern Europe, as evidenced by skeletal remains. It is uncertain why it was so common, but researchers speculate a person bound in this way might be considered to have killed themselves, versus being killed by another, perhaps connected to a taboo against killing people of high status. Victims may have been part of a ritual sacrifice. Rock art in Addaura Cave, Sicily, made between 16,000 and 13,000 BP, depict two human figures bound in the incaprettamento manner. Today, it is a method of murder mostly associated with the Italian Mafia, who have used it as a ritual warning or reprimand.

== See also ==
- Capital punishment
- Constriction
- Decapitation
- Fainting game
- Hanging
- Long drop
- Short drop
- Strangulation in domestic violence
- Thuggee

== Sources ==
- Ohlenkamp, Neil (2006). Judo Unleashed. McGraw-Hill Education. ISBN 0-07-147534-6. Basic reference on judo choking techniques.
