= Erotic asphyxiation =

Intentional restriction of oxygen to the brain for sexual arousal

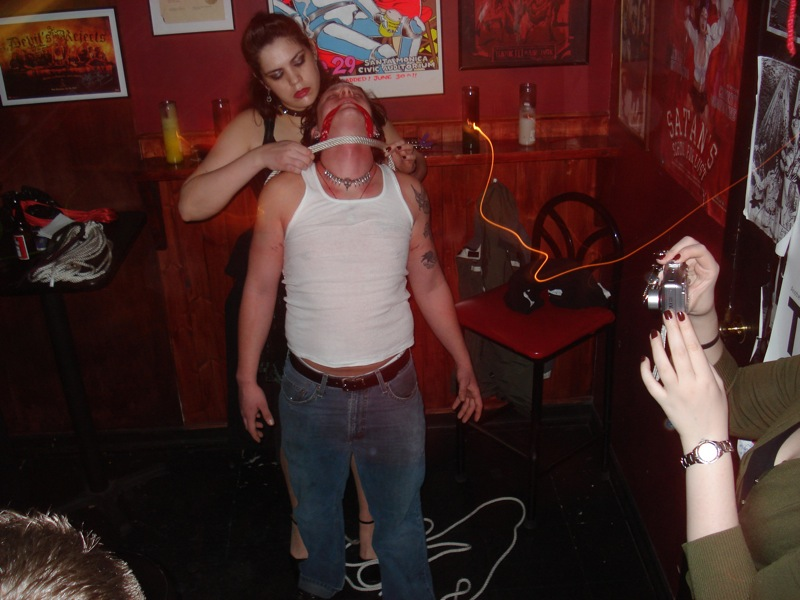
A woman choking a man for erotic purposes

Erotic asphyxiation (variously called asphyxiophilia, hypoxyphilia or breath control play) is the intentional restriction of oxygen to the brain for the purposes of sexual arousal. With a partner (or alone), the act often involves strangulation. The term autoerotic asphyxiation is used when the act is done by a person to themself. Colloquially, a person engaging in the activity is sometimes called a gasper. Erotic asphyxiation can lead to accidental death due to asphyxia.

In the Diagnostic and Statistical Manual of the American Psychiatric Association, and internationally it may be diagnosed as a paraphilic disorder, because it involves significant risk of injury or death.

== Physiology ==
Practitioners describe a number of physiological responses including "pleasurable sensations/euphoria (81.7%), a head rush (43.8%), feeling like they could not breathe (43.0%), difficulty swallowing (38.9%), unable to speak (37.6%), and watery eyes (37.2%). About 15% had noticed neck bruising and 3% had lost consciousness from being choked."

== History ==
The practice of autoerotic asphyxiation has been documented since the early 17th century. It was first used as a treatment for erectile dysfunction. The idea for this most likely came from subjects who were executed by hanging. Observers at public hangings noted that male victims developed an erection, sometimes remaining after death (a death erection).

=== Pornography law ===
The Crime and Policing Act 2026 banned pornography depicting erotic asphyxiation in the United Kingdom.

== Practice ==
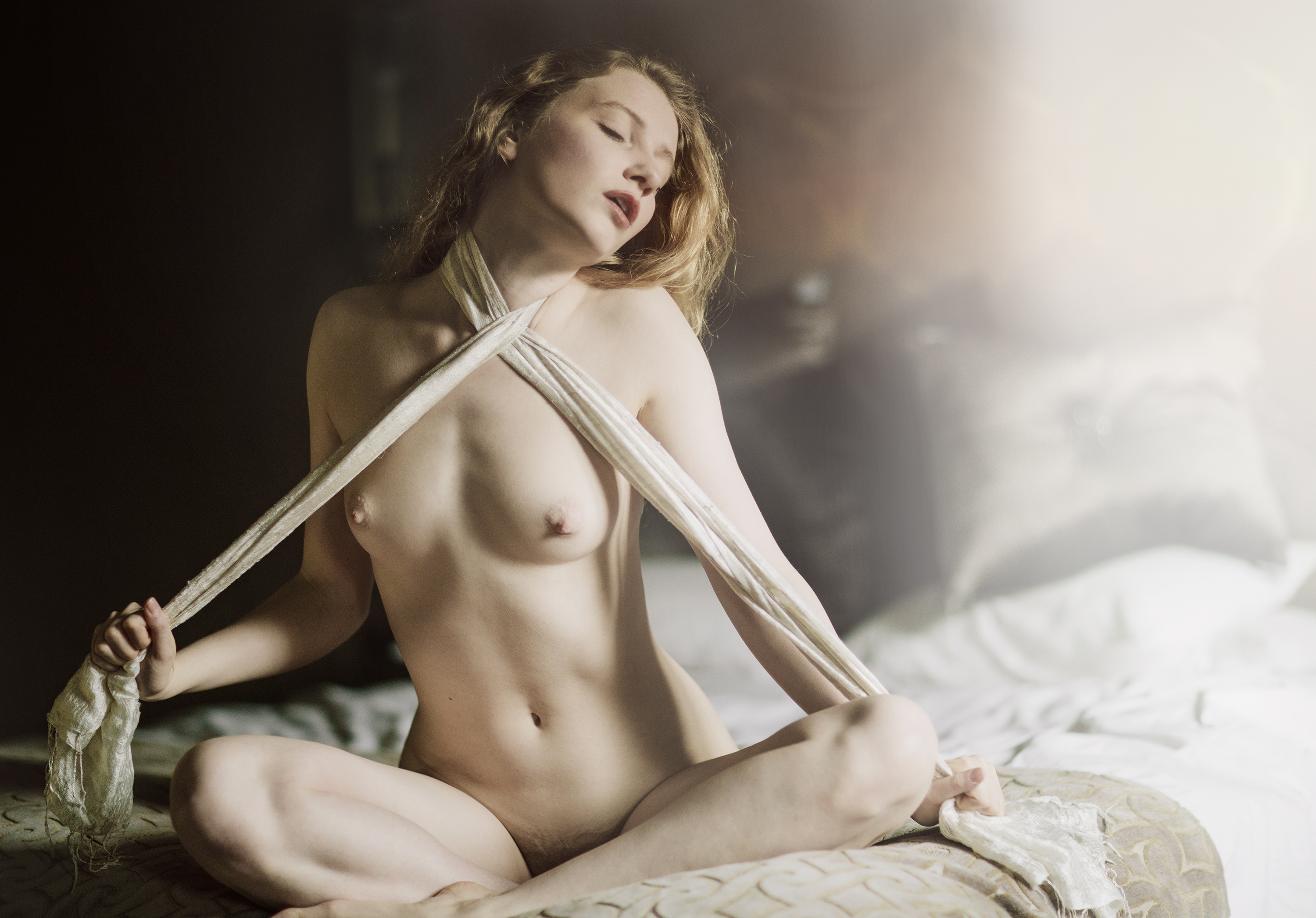
A woman who is getting sexual pleasure by strangling herself.

Various methods are used to achieve the level of oxygen depletion needed, such as a hanging, suffocation with a plastic bag over the head, self-strangulation such as with a ligature, gas or volatile solvents, chest compression, or some combination of these. Complicated devices (such as hydraulics) are sometimes used to produce the desired effects. The practice can be dangerous even if performed with care and has resulted in a number of accidental deaths. A 2014 review estimated that accidental deaths during solitary sexual activity occur at around 0.5 per million people per year in Western countries, translating to about roughly 62 to 155 deaths per year in the United States. Cases have also been reported in Scandinavia and Germany. Swedish police reported in 1994 that the number of autoerotic asphyxiation fatalities in the Stockholm area (c. 1.7 million inhabitants) were at least five annually, but the number of unrecorded cases was assumed to be high. Autoerotic asphyxiation may often be mistaken for suicide, which is a major cause of death in teenagers.

In a 2021 survey of US students, women and transgender/nonbinary/gender nonconforming individuals are more likely to have been choked during sex than men.

== Accidental death (with autoerotic asphyxiation) ==
Deaths often occur when the loss of consciousness caused by partial asphyxia leads to loss of control over the means of strangulation, resulting in continued asphyxia and death. While often asphyxiophilia is incorporated into sex with a partner, others enjoy this behaviour by themselves, making it potentially more difficult to get out of dangerous situations.

In some fatality cases, the body of the asphyxiophiliac individual is discovered naked or with genitalia in hand, with pornographic material or sex toys present, or with evidence of having orgasmed prior to death. Bodies found at the scene of an accidental death often show evidence of other paraphilic activities, such as fetishistic cross-dressing and masochism. In cases involving teenagers at home, families may disturb the scene by "sanitizing" it, removing evidence of paraphilic activity. This can have the consequence of making the death appear to be a deliberate suicide, rather than an accident.

The great majority of known erotic asphyxial deaths are male; among all known cases in Ontario and Alberta from 1974 to 1987, only 1 out of 117 cases was female. Some individual cases of women with erotic asphyxia have been reported. The main age of accidental death is mid-20s, but deaths have been reported in adolescents and in men in their 70s.

Lawyers and insurance companies have brought cases to the attention of clinicians because some life insurance claims are payable in the event of accidental death, but not suicide. Estimating the number of deaths worldwide and how many are due to a mental disorder is very difficult due to lack of data from populous developing countries such as India.

== In fiction ==
Erotic asphyxiation appears in a number of works of fiction.

- In the Marquis de Sade's famous novel Justine, or The Misfortunes of the Virtue, Justine is subjected to this by one of her captors. She survives the encounter.
- In the Guts short story in Chuck Palahniuk's novel Haunted, one of the characters discusses parents who discover the accidental deaths of their sons to autoerotic asphyxiation. They are said to cover up the deaths before police or coroners arrive to save the family from shame.
- In the novel (and later movie adaptation) Rising Sun, death as a result of this type of sexual arousal is explained when it is offered as a possible cause for a murder victim's death.
- In the film World's Greatest Dad, the protagonist's teenage son accidentally kills himself with asphyxiation whilst sexually aroused. The protagonist then stages his son's death as a suicide, which gives him the opportunity to rise to infamy through a literary hoax.
- It is a recurring theme in the fiction of William S Burroughs especially Naked Lunch, where hanging is depicted as resulting in instant ejaculation.
- In the House M.D. episode, "Love Hurts", patient Harvey Park is an asphyxiaphyliac who pays a dominatrix to administer errotic asphyxiation. As a result of the proclivity, he requires surgery for damage to the blood vessels of his throat.

== See also ==
- Cerebral hypoxia
- Choke hold
- Choking game
- Facesitting
- Hypoxia
- Self-bondage
- Sexual fetishism
