= Lumen (band) =

Russian rock band

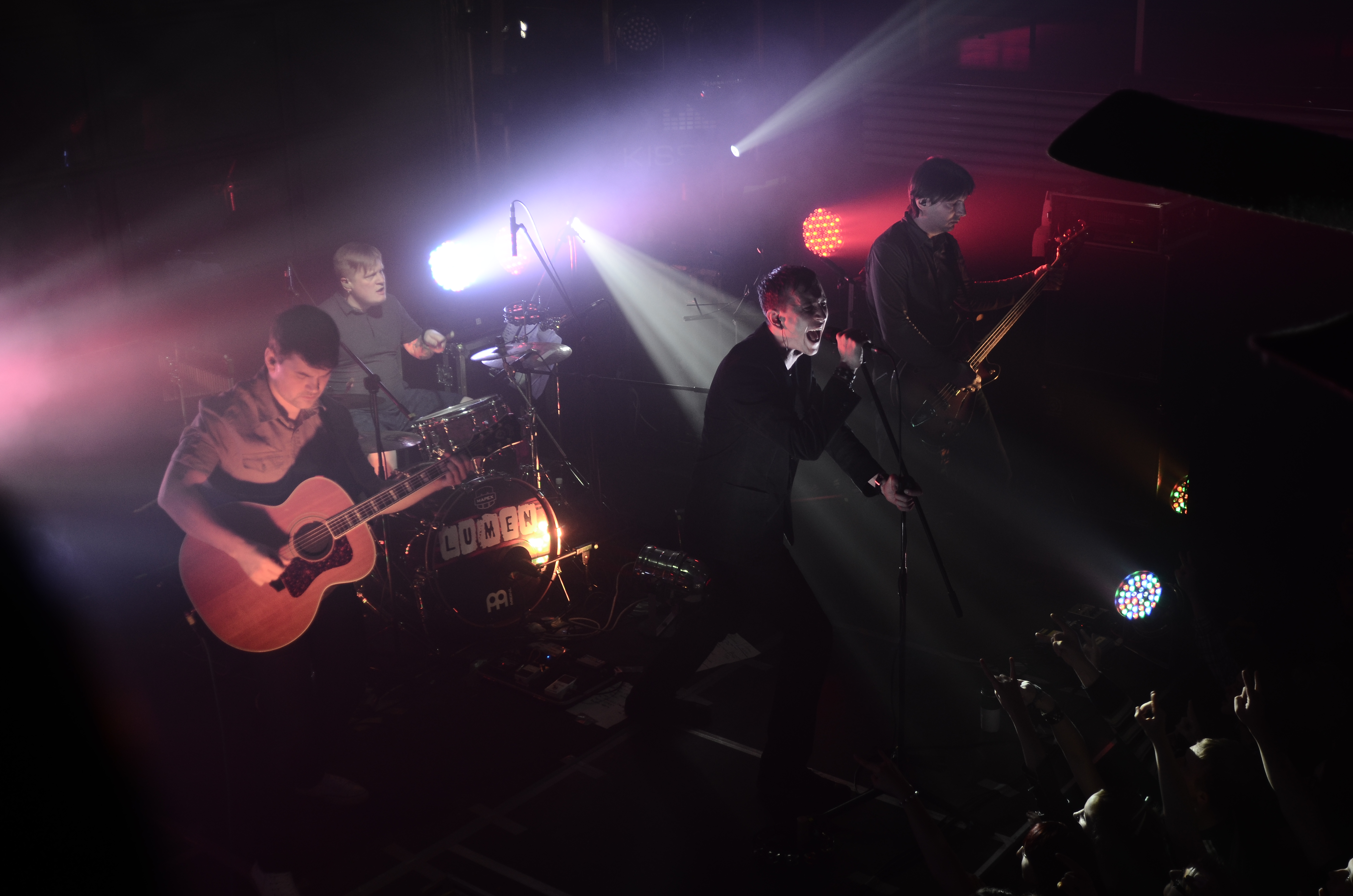
- Lumen concert in Donetsk (2013)

Background information
- Origin: Ufa, Russia
- Genres: Alternative rock, alternative metal, post-grunge, nu metal, punk rock (early)
- Years active: 1998–present
- Members: Rustem Bulatov; Igor Mamaev; Yevgeni Trishin; Denis Shakhanov
- Past members: Yevgeni Ognev
- Website: lumen.ws

Lumen is a Russian rock band from Ufa. It has released seven studio albums to date.

The band considers February 12, 1998 as its birthday because on that date it performed as "Lumen" for the first time. The band's earlier works have an alternative rock sound with a strong influence of punk. However, they took a heavier approach on later releases. The lyrics are usually written by singer and frontman Rustem "Tem" Bulatov. The band's songs are inspired by diverse controversial events and issues which take place inside and outside Russia, as well as personal struggles.

== Biography ==
=== 1996–2000 ===
Rustem Bulatov (vocals), Igor Mamaev (guitar) and Denis Shakhanov (drums) had been jamming together with different bass players. Finally, Yevgeni Ognev was accepted as a full-time member. During this period, the band did not have a constant name and was playing cover versions of Grazhdanskaya Oborona and Kino songs, as well as writing their first original material.

=== 2001 ===
In 2001, Lumen had a headline performance at Navigator Club in their hometown.

=== 2002 ===
The major part of the year was spent in the studio working on the debut full-length record.

=== 2003 ===
The band released their debut album called Без консервантов ("No Preservatives Added") which contains 18 songs, including their breakthrough single "Sid & Nancy".

=== 2004 ===
In 2004, the band began to work with Vadim Bazeev, who today is a director and producer of the group.

=== 2005 ===
At the beginning of the year the band published their second live album, Одной крови (Same Blood). This album included two new songs, "Не спеши" (Don't hurry up) and "Благовещенск (02)" (Blagoveshchensk (02)). In October of that year they published their third studio album, Свобода (Freedom). The sound of the group began to be tougher, and some songs are very socially acute. The lyrics of the song "Государство (State)" are still actual – "It's kind of democracy here but it's actually an empire. I love my country so much, but I hate the State!"

=== 2006-present ===
In August 2014, the band cancelled their concert in a festival in Ukraine after it found out that the proceeds of the festival would be used to support the Azov Battalion of the Ukrainian army; that at the time fought in the War in Donbass.

=== Conclusion ===
The song "Gosudarstvo" ("The State"), featuring lyrics that are very critical of the Russian political situation, became the most audience-demanded song on A-One.

== Members ==
- Rustem Bulatov (Tem) – vocals, sampler
- Igor Mamaev (Garik) – guitar, backing vocal
- Yevgeni Trishin (Shmel) – bass, guitar, keyboards
- Denis Shakhanov (Dan) – drums

=== Past member ===
- Yevgeni Ognev (John) – bass, left the group in March 2007

== Albums ==
=== Studio albums ===
Release date	Title
2003	Без консервантов (With No Preservatives)
2004	Три пути (Three Ways)
2005	Свобода (Freedom)
2007	Правда? (The truth? OR: Really?)
2009	Мир (World OR: Peace)
2012	На части (To Pieces)
2013	Нет времени для любви (No time for love)
2016	Свидетели хроники бешеных дней (Beholders of the crazy days' chronicle)
2020	Покажите солнце (Show the sun)
2022	Диссонанс (Dissonance)

=== Live albums ===
- Live in Navigator club (2002)
- Одной крови (Same Blood) (2005)
- Дыши (Breathe) (2006)
- Буря (Tempest) (2007)
- Лабиринт (Labyrinth) (2011)
- Акустика (Acoustics) (2014)
- Всегда 17 - всегда война (Always 17 - always war) (2015)
- XX LIVE (XX LIVE) (2019)
- Без консервантов. Live (Without preservatives. Live) (2021)

=== DVDs ===
- Дыши (Breathe) (2006)
- Буря (Tempest) (2007)
- Record МИРА (2010) – documentary film about recording the album Мир
- Live at Teleclub (Ekaterinburg) (2011)

=== Compilation albums ===
- The Best (2007)

=== Singles ===
- "Пассатижи" (Pliers) (2003, maxi-single)
- "TV No More" (2008, internet single)

== Awards ==
=== Russian Alternative Music Prize ===
The RAMP Awards are awarded annually by the A-One TV channel.

- Best Artist – 2007, 2008
- Best Album – 2007 (Pravda?), 2009 (Mir)

=== Fuzz Awards ===
The Fuzz Awards is an annual Russian awards ceremony established in 1997 by rock music magazine of Fuzz.

- Best New Artist – 2007
- Best Album – 2008 (Pravda?)

=== ZD Awards ===
The ZD Awards are awarded annually by the Moskovsky Komsomolets.

- Best Alternative Act – 2009
