= Blackout challenge =

Internet challenge revolving around the choking game

The blackout challenge is an internet challenge based around the choking game, which deprives the brain of oxygen. It gained widespread attention on TikTok in 2021, primarily among children. It has been compared to other online challenges and hoaxes that have exclusively targeted a young audience. Some news reports and advocacy groups have linked the challenge to several fatalities.

== Origin and spread ==
The concept of choking games has existed from before the popularization of social media. A 2008 CDC report identified 82 "probable choking-game deaths" between young people aged 6 to 19 between 1995 and 2007.

The name "Blackout Challenge" first gained media attention in January 2021 following the death of a 10-year-old girl in Palermo, Italy. In response to this 2021 incident, TikTok denied the existence of the challenge by saying “While we have not currently found evidence of content on our platform that might have encouraged such an incident off-platform, we will continue to monitor closely as part of our continuous commitment to keep our community safe. We will also assist the relevant authorities with their investigation as appropriate.”

=== Similar challenges ===
Time magazine reported in 2018 that social media platforms made information about the concept more widespread, leading more children to attempt it alone rather than with others. In 2019, alleged internet challenges that involved self-harm, such as the "Momo" and "Blue Whale" challenges, created widespread coverage online for allegedly encouraging children to attempt suicide. The Atlantic reported that both were ultimately hoaxes that used local news reporting and concerned online posts to spread the challenges, which never became prevalent online.

== Impact and lawsuits ==
The Washington Post reported that TikTok chose not to block search results for the challenge and related terms, instead presenting a warning message. The challenge is linked to the deaths of between fifteen and twenty children. Several lawsuits have been filed against TikTok for allegedly causing the deaths of children who have attempted it, though all have ended up in dismissals based on legal immunity.

Subsequent media investigations and court filings linked the challenge to a broader number of incidents across the world. Bloomsberg Businessweek reported that around 20 children died in an eighteen-month period from 2021-2022, other news outlets suggested this figure could be higher. Advocacy groups and law firms in the United States have described the trend and one of the most dangerous trends to have affected children.

Paul Diamond, a district judge in Philadelphia, ruled that the company was immune from a lawsuit under the Communications Decency Act and Section 230, which prevents liability based on the work of others. The Court of Appeals for the Third Circuit reversed Diamond on August 26, 2024, holding that the protections afforded by the Communications Decency Act and Section 230 do not apply to the algorithms used by social media.

In 2025, the parents of 4 British teenagers who died after attempting the challenge filed a wrongful death lawsuit against TikTok in Delaware, suggesting that TikTok's "For You" algorithm promoted the blackout challenge videos to minors and failed to outline adequate safety measures. As a result, the case has sparked a large debate on online safety regulations, including discussions surrounding the UK Online Safety Act.

== See also ==
- Benadryl challenge
- Tide Pod challenge
- List of Internet challenges
- List of Internet phenomena
