= Choking game =

Dangerous game of trying to faint

The choking game, or fainting game, also sometimes referred to as space monkeys, is the act of intentionally cutting off oxygen to the brain with the goal of inducing temporary loss of consciousness and euphoria. A related internet challenge, the blackout challenge, encourages playing the choking game online.

== Reasons for practice ==
Limited research has been conducted regarding motivations for practicing the fainting game, although thrill seeking has been identified as a risk factor, as has the perception that it is a low-risk activity. Anecdotal reasons stated include:

- Peer pressure, a challenge or dare, a rite of passage into a social group or amusement over erratic behavior.
- Curiosity in experiencing an altered state of consciousness, the experience of a greyout, or an imagined approximation to a near-death experience.
- A belief that it can induce a brief sense of euphoria (a rushing sensation or high).
- The prospect of intoxication, albeit brief, at no financial cost.

Reasons for practice are distinct from erotic asphyxiation. Steve Field, chairman of the Royal College of General Practitioners in London, claims that the fainting game is pursued primarily by children and teenagers "to get a high without taking drugs." Children "aren't playing this game for sexual gratification." It is frequently confused with erotic asphyxiation, which is oxygen deprivation for sexual arousal. Unlike erotic asphyxiation, practice of the fainting game appears to be uncommon in adulthood.

== Mechanisms of effect ==
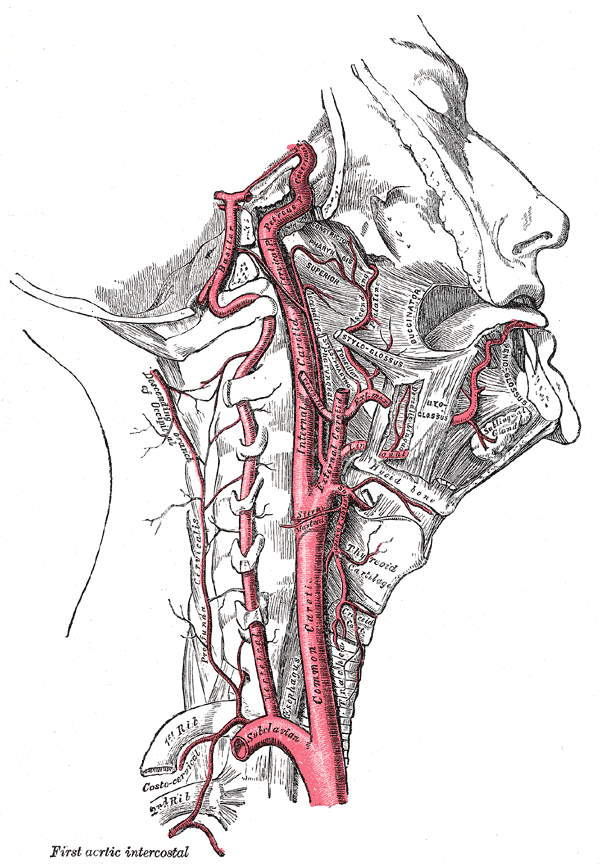
The vulnerable carotid artery, (large, red tube), and the vagus nerve running parallel on its left

There are two main mechanisms behind many variations of this practice, both resulting in cerebral hypoxia (oxygen deprivation to the brain). The two mechanisms tend to be confused with each other or treated as one but are quite dissimilar, although both have the potential to cause permanent brain damage or death. The two mechanisms are strangulation and self-induced hypocapnia and work as follows:

=== Strangulation ===
A ligature such as a belt or rope around the neck, or hands or arm pressure on the neck compresses the internal carotid artery. Apart from the direct restriction of blood to the brain there are two other significant responses produced by pressing on the neck:

- Pressing on the carotid arteries also presses on baroreceptors. These bodies then cause vasodilatation in the brain leading to insufficient blood to perfuse the brain with oxygen and maintain consciousness.
- A message is also sent via the vagus nerve to the main pacemaker of the heart to decrease the rate and volume of the heartbeat, typically by a third. In some cases there is evidence that this may escalate into asystole, a form of cardiac arrest that is difficult to treat. There is a dissenting view on the full extent how and when a person reaches a stage of permanent injury, but it is agreed that pressure on the vagus nerve causes changes to pulse rate and blood pressure and is dangerous in cases of carotid sinus hypersensitivity.

=== Increased breathing ===
The second mechanism requires hyperventilation (forced overbreathing) until symptoms of hypocapnia such as tingling, light-headedness or dizziness are felt, followed by a breath-hold. This alone is enough to cause a blackout, but it is widely believed that the effect is enhanced if lung air pressure is increased by holding the breath "hard" or "bearing down" (tightening the diaphragm as in a forced exhalation while allowing no air to escape or having an assistant apply a bear-hug). These latter actions may augment the effects of hypoxia by approximating the Valsalva maneuver, causing vagal stimulation.

The hyperventilation leads to an excessive elimination of carbon dioxide (CO_{2}) whereas no significant additional amounts of oxygen can be stocked in the body. As carbon dioxide is the primary breathing stimulus, after hyperventilation, breath can be held longer until cerebral hypoxia occurs. The blood also becomes abnormally alkaline as a result of the excessive elimination of carbon dioxide; this subsequent rise in blood pH is termed alkalosis. Alkalosis interferes with normal oxygen utilization by the brain. The symptoms of alkalosis are neuromuscular irritability, muscular spasms, tingling and numbness of the extremities and around the mouth, and a dizziness, or giddiness, often interpreted as a sense of euphoria.

The cerebral vasculature is sensitive to changes in arterial carbon dioxide levels; hypocapnia causes cerebral vasoconstriction, whereas hypercapnia causes cerebral vasodilation. This vasoconstriction appears to be made even worse by a sudden increase in blood pressure caused by squeezing or holding the breath "hard". The alkalosis-induced euphoria can be followed rapidly by hypoxia-induced unconsciousness. The sequence of events leading to unconsciousness from hyperventilation is as follows:

1. Decrease in partial pressure of alveolar CO_{2}.
2. Decrease in partial pressure of arterial CO_{2}.
3. Increase in blood pH, (respiratory alkalosis).
4. Vasoconstriction of blood vessels supplying brain.
5. Pooling of the blood present in the brain at the time.
6. Brain rapidly uses up oxygen (O_{2}) available in the pooled blood.
7. O_{2} concentration in the brain drops.
8. Unconsciousness from hypoxia of cerebral tissue.

Because the brain cannot store reserves of oxygen and, unlike other organs, has an exceedingly low tolerance of oxygen deprivation, it is highly vulnerable if vasoconstriction is not reversed. Normally, if the brain is hypoxic, autonomous systems in the body divert blood to the brain at the expense of other organs; because the brain is vasoconstricted this mechanism is not available. Vasoconstriction is only reversed by the build-up of carbon dioxide in the blood through suspension of breathing.

In some versions the bear-hug is replaced by pressure on the neck in which case blackout is a hybrid of strangulation and self-induced hypocapnia.

=== Other mechanisms ===
Unconsciousness may be induced by other methods although these are controversial: pressure over the carotid sinus may induce syncope (fainting) without any other action at all but this is difficult to reproduce and is not the basis of the game. For those susceptible to carotid sinus syncope, of which most people would be unaware until it occurred, this can be an exceedingly dangerous game.

In both strangulation and self-induced hypocapnia blackouts the victim may experience dreaming or hallucinations, though fleetingly, and regains consciousness with short-term memory loss and involuntary movement of their hands or feet. Full recovery is usually made within seconds if the strangulation stops.

== Prevalence ==
A 2008 Centre for Addiction and Mental Health study found that at least 79,000 students in the Canadian province of Ontario participated in this act. The 2006 Youth Health Risk Behavioral Survey in Williams County, Ohio found that 11% of youths aged 12–18 years and 19% of youths aged 17–18 reported ever having practiced it.

A challenge, named the "blackout challenge", became widespread on TikTok in 2021, resulting in multiple fatalities of children.

== Injuries and fatalities ==
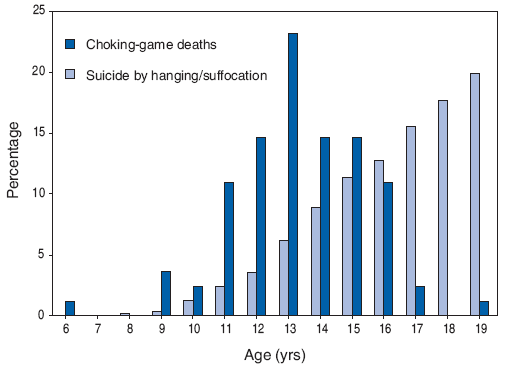
Age distribution of youths aged 6–19 years whose deaths were attributed to the "choking game" (n=82) during 1995–2007, compared with youths whose deaths were attributed to suicide by hanging/suffocation (n=5,101) during 1999–2005

Any activity that deprives the brain of oxygen has the potential to cause moderate to severe brain cell death leading to permanent loss of neurological function ranging from difficulty in concentration or loss of short-term memory capacity through severe, lifelong mental disability to death. Statistics on fatalities and neurological damage are controversial; no definitive, empirical study exists although the indications are that the practice is a significant contributor to death and disability, particularly among male juveniles in most developed countries. Some research suggests that deaths are significantly underreported because of false attributions to suicide.

One study by the U.S. Centers for Disease Control and Prevention (CDC) found sufficient evidence to indicate that since 1995 at least 82 youths between the age of 6 and 19 have died in the United States as a result of the game (roughly 1% of the deaths attributed to suicide by suffocation in the same age group), see chart. Of these 86.6% were male, and the mean age was 13.3. 95.7% of these deaths occurred while the youth was alone; parents of the decedents were unaware of the game in 92.9% of cases. Deaths were recorded in 31 states and were not clustered by location, season or day of week. Neurological damage is harder to attribute accurately because of the difficulty of linking generalised, acquired neurological disability to a specific past event.

Incidental, or indirect, injuries may arise from falling or uncontrolled movements and crushing by a ligature or an assistant. Such injuries may include concussion, bone fractures, tongue biting and hemorrhaging of the eyes.

The CDC encourages parents, educators and health-care providers to familiarize themselves with the signs of the game. These include discussion of the game, bloodshot eyes, marks on the neck, severe headaches, disorientation after spending time alone, ropes, scarves, and belts tied to bedroom furniture or doorknobs or found knotted on the floor, and unexplained presence of things like dog leashes, choke collars and bungee cords.

== In popular culture ==
The choking game phenomenon was the subject of the 2014 television film The Choking Game, based on the novel Choke by Diana Lopez.

In the season 5 episode of Criminal Minds called "Risky Business," a serial killer uses an online version of the choking game to get teenagers to accidentally commit suicide.

== See also ==
- Archie Battersbee case
- Asphyxia
- Blue Whale Challenge
- Momo Challenge hoax
- Benadryl challenge
- Shallow water blackout – for further discussion on the hyperventilation mechanism
